= Audi TT =

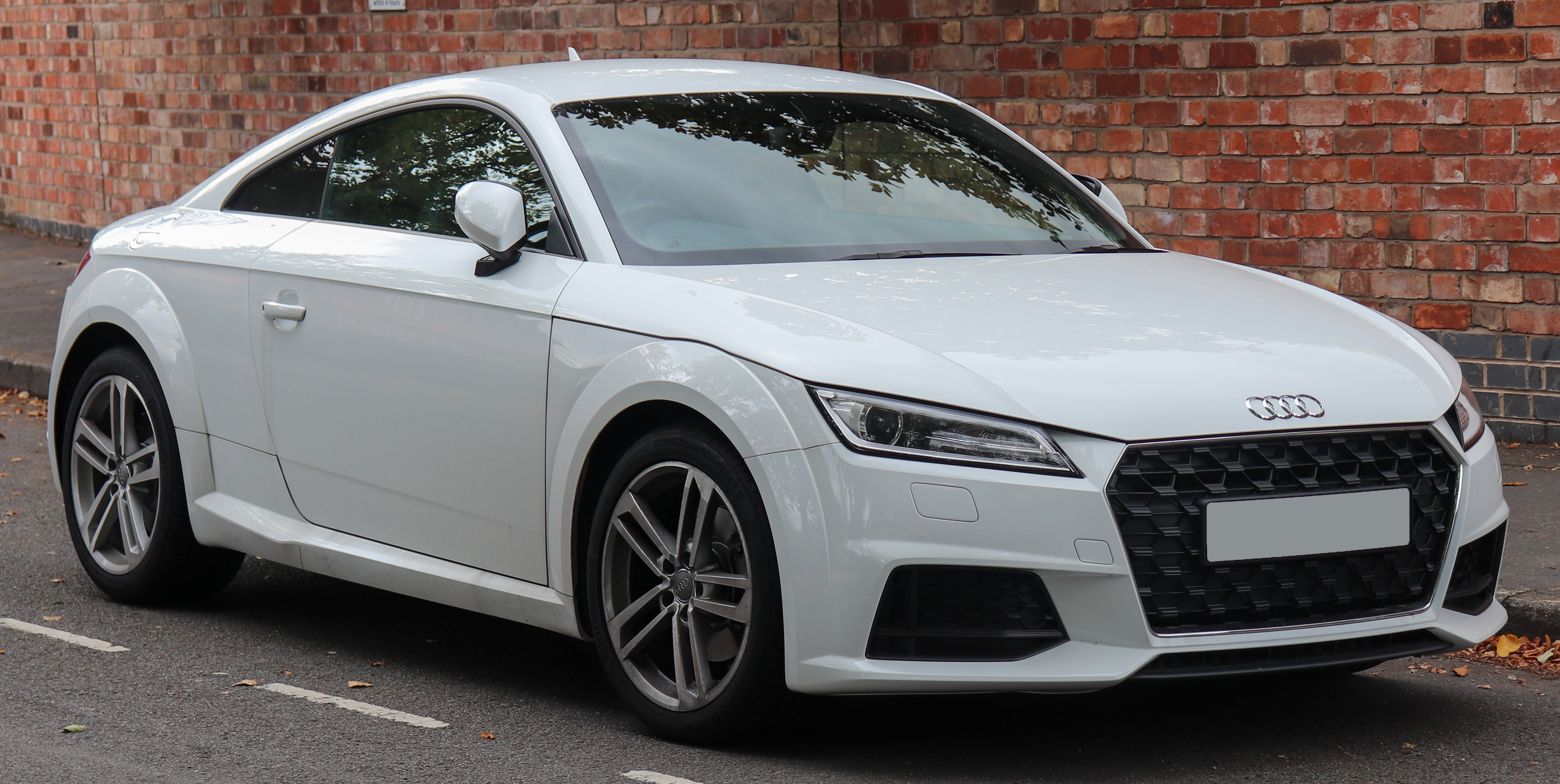
- 2019 Audi TT Sport 40 TFSi

Overview
- Manufacturer: Audi AG
- Production: February 1998 – November 2023
- Model years: 1999–2023
- Assembly: Hungary: Győr (engines and final assembly)

Body and chassis
- Class: Sports car (S)
- Body style: 3-door coupé (first and second generations); 2-door coupé (third generation); 2-door roadster
- Layout: Front-engine, front-wheel-drive; Front-engine, all-wheel-drive (quattro)
- Platform: Volkswagen Group A Volkswagen Group MQB

The Audi TT is a sports car manufactured and marketed by Audi from 1998 to 2023 across three generations. Its bodystyles included a coupé with a 2+2 seating arrangement and a two-seater roadster. For each of its three generations, the TT has been based on consecutive generations of Volkswagen's "Group A" platforms, starting with its "PQ34" fourth generation. The TT shared powertrain and suspension layouts with other models made on these platforms, including the Audi A3, like a transversely mounted front-engine, powering front-wheel drive or four-wheel drive, and fully independent suspension using MacPherson struts in the front.

The TT's first two generations were assembled by Audi's Hungarian subsidiary, one of the world's largest engine manufacturing plants, using bodyshells manufactured and painted at Audi's Ingolstadt plant and parts made entirely by the Hungarian factory for the third generation. In total, 662,762 Audi TTs were built, with the last manufactured in November 2023.

== Design ==
Styling of the Audi TT began in the spring of 1994 at the Volkswagen Group Design Center in California. The TT was first shown as a concept car at the 1995 Frankfurt Motor Show. The design is credited to J Mays and Freeman Thomas, with Hartmut Warkuss, Peter Schreyer, Martin Smith and Romulus Rost contributing to the interior design.

A laser beam welding technique, which enabled seamless design features on the first-generation TT, delayed its introduction. Audi did not offer an automatic transmission option for the TT until 2003, when it offered a dual clutch six-speed Direct-Shift Gearbox (DSG), with the United Kingdom TT variants becoming the world's first market for a dual clutch transmission configured for a right-hand drive vehicle, although the outright world first for a road car equipped with a dual clutch transmission was claimed earlier by a Volkswagen Group platform-mate, the left hand drive Volkswagen Golf Mk4 R32.

== Name ==
The Audi TT takes its name from the Isle of Man TT (Tourist Trophy) motorcycle race — where NSU, Audi's predecessor, had enjoyed considerable motor racing success. NSU marque began competing at the Isle of Man TT in 1907 with the UK manager Martin Geiger finishing in fifth position in the single-cylinder race. The 1938 Isle of Man Lightweight TT race was won by Ewald Kluge with a 250 cc supercharged DKW motor-cycle and the DKW and NSU companies later merged into the company now known as Audi. The Audi TT also follows the NSU 1000TT, 1200TT and TTS cars of the 1960s in taking their names from the race.

The TT nameplate has also been attributed to the phrase "Technology & Tradition".

== TT Mk1 (Type 8N, 1998–2006) ==
First generation (8N)
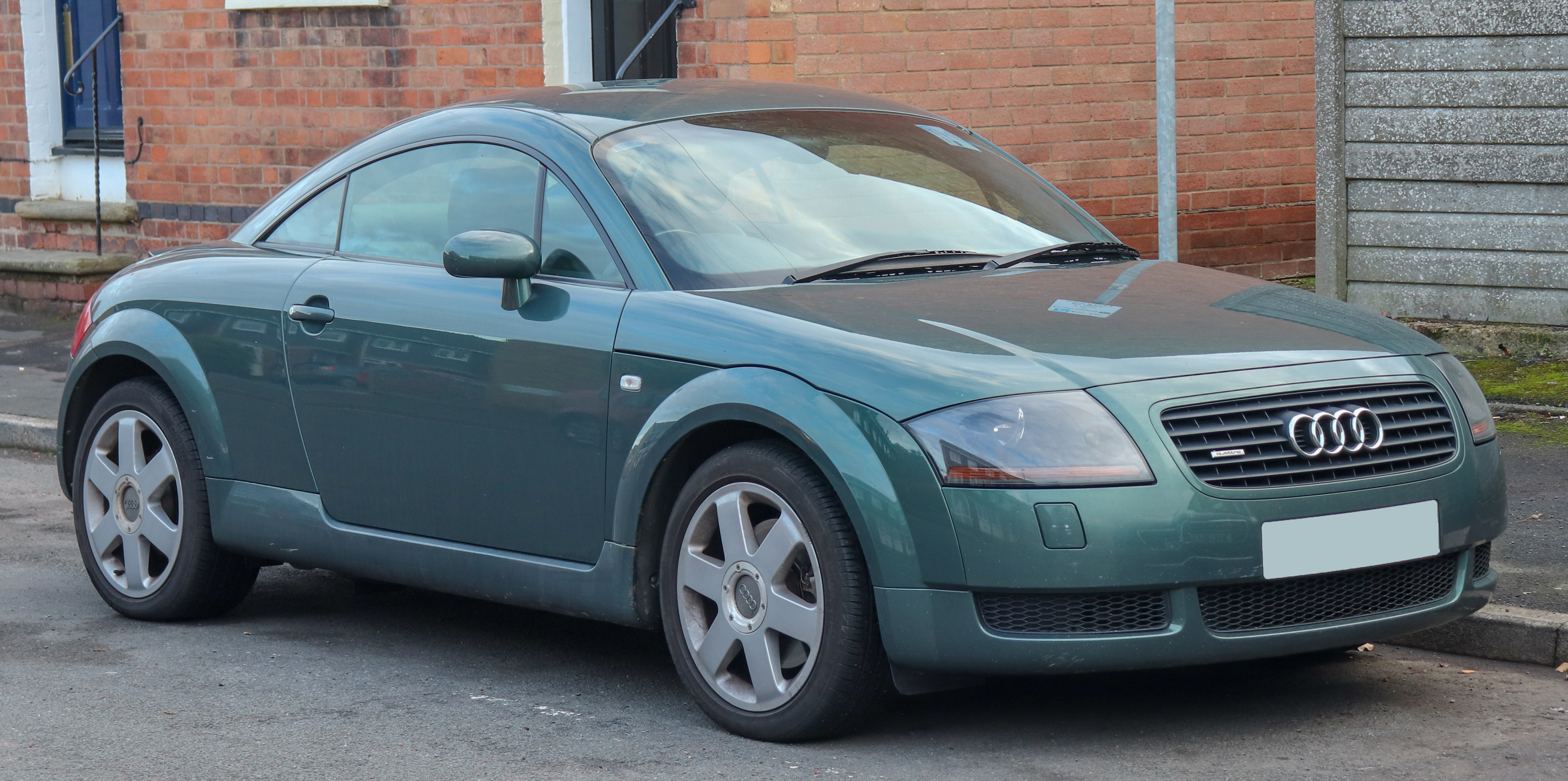

Overview
- Production: Coupé: February 1998 – June 2006; Roadster: August 1999 – June 2006
- Designer: Freeman Thomas; Peter Schreyer (1995)

Body and chassis
- Platform: Volkswagen Group A4 (PQ34)
- Related: Audi A3 (First Generation); Volkswagen Golf Mk4; Volkswagen New Beetle; Volkswagen Bora/Jetta (Fourth Generation); SEAT León (First Generation); SEAT Toledo (Second Generation); Škoda Octavia (First Generation)

Powertrain
- Engine: 1.8 L 20v turbocharged I4; 3.2 L 24v VR6
- Transmission: 5-speed manual 02J (front-wheel drive 180 PS); 5-speed manual 02M (all-wheel drive 180 PS); 6-speed manual 02M (all models 225 PS); 6-speed Tiptronic automatic; 6-speed DSG dual clutch automatic (3.2 L Quattro only)

Dimensions
- Wheelbase: 2,422 mm (95.4 in); Quattro: 2,428 mm (95.6 in)
- Length: 4,041 mm (159.1 in)
- Width: 1,764 mm (69.4 in)
- Height: 1,346 mm (53.0 in)

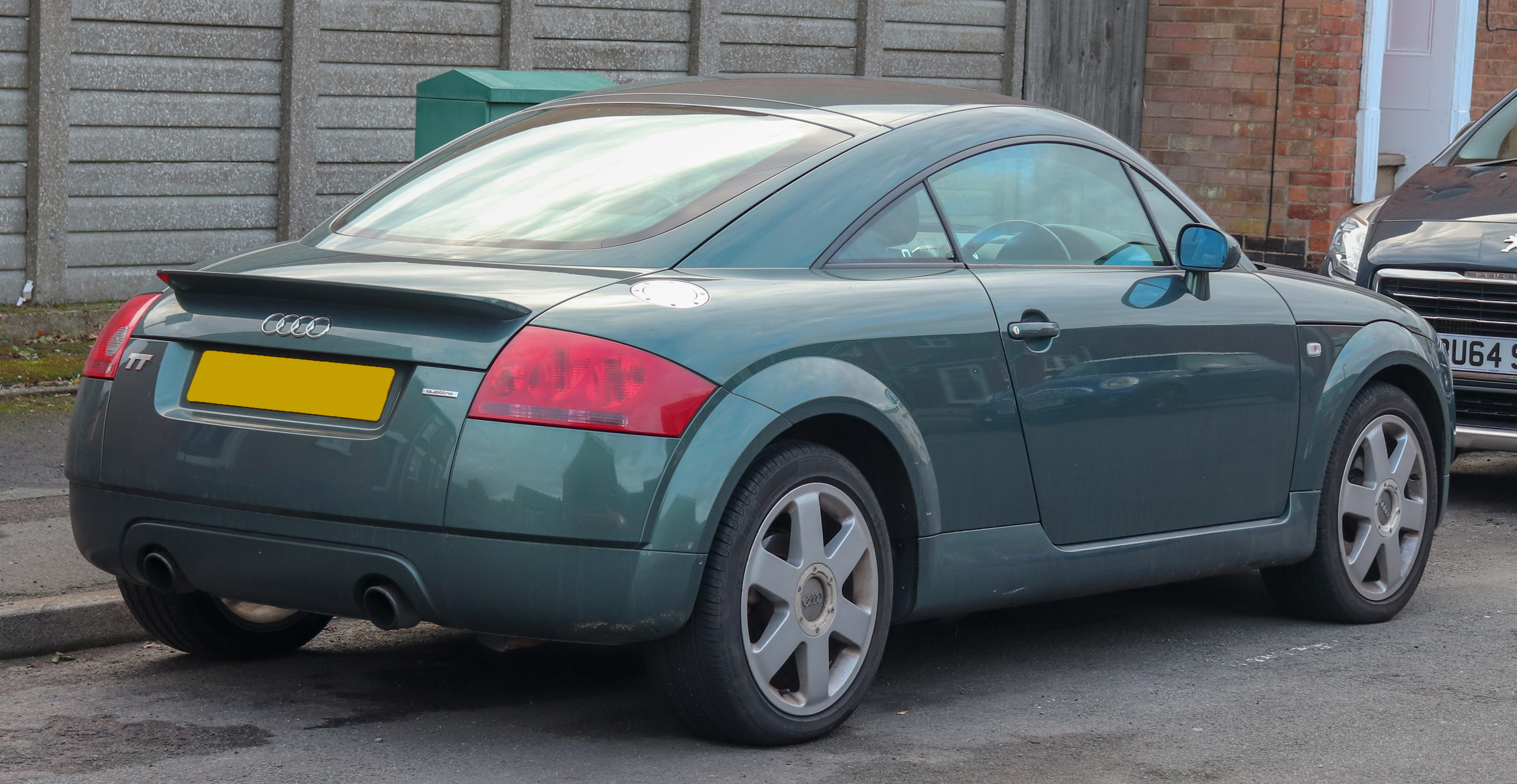
Audi TT Quattro pre-facelift

Audi TT Roadster in its original appearance, prior to addition of mandated rear spoiler.

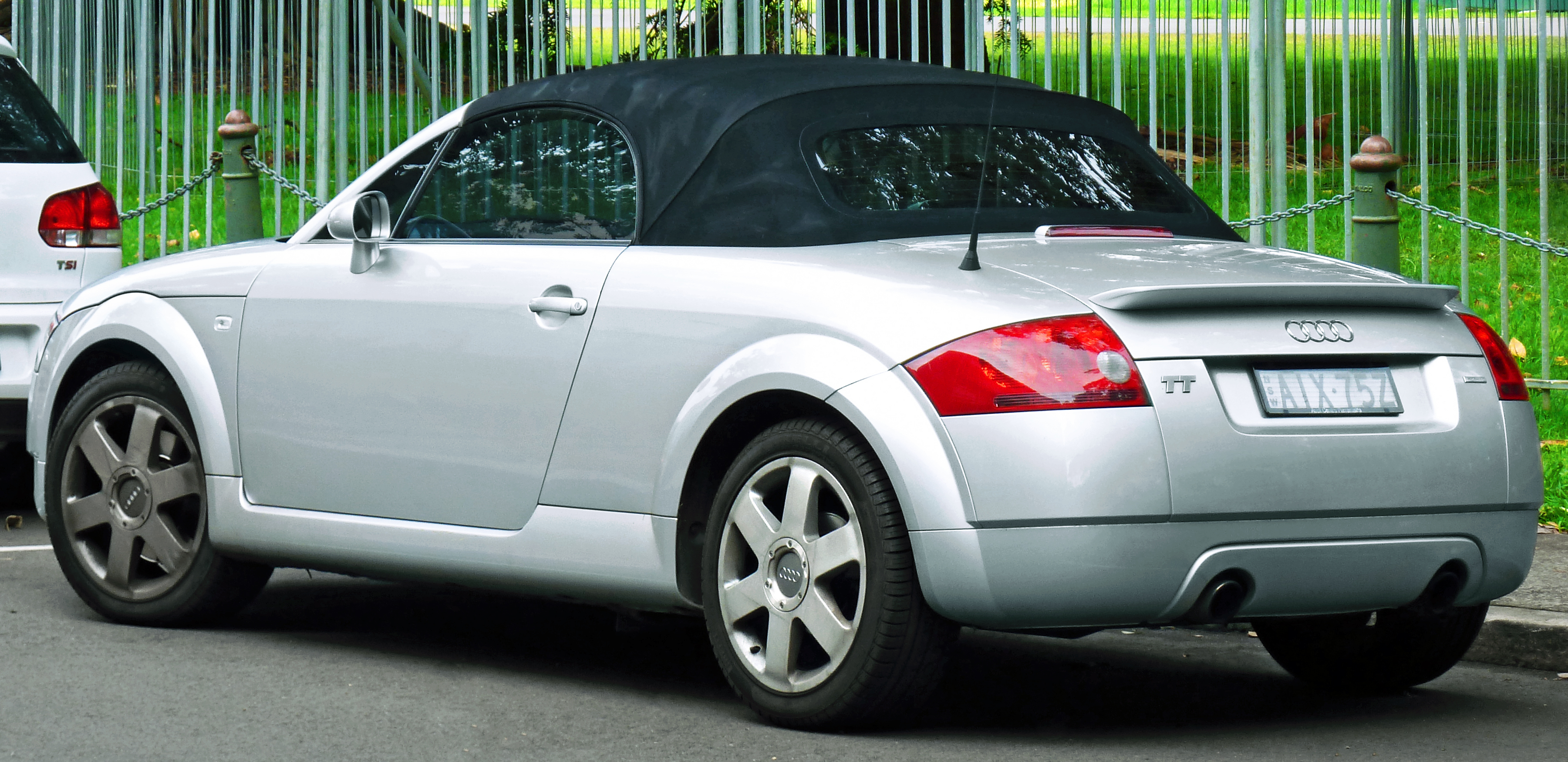
Audi TT 1.8 T Roadster

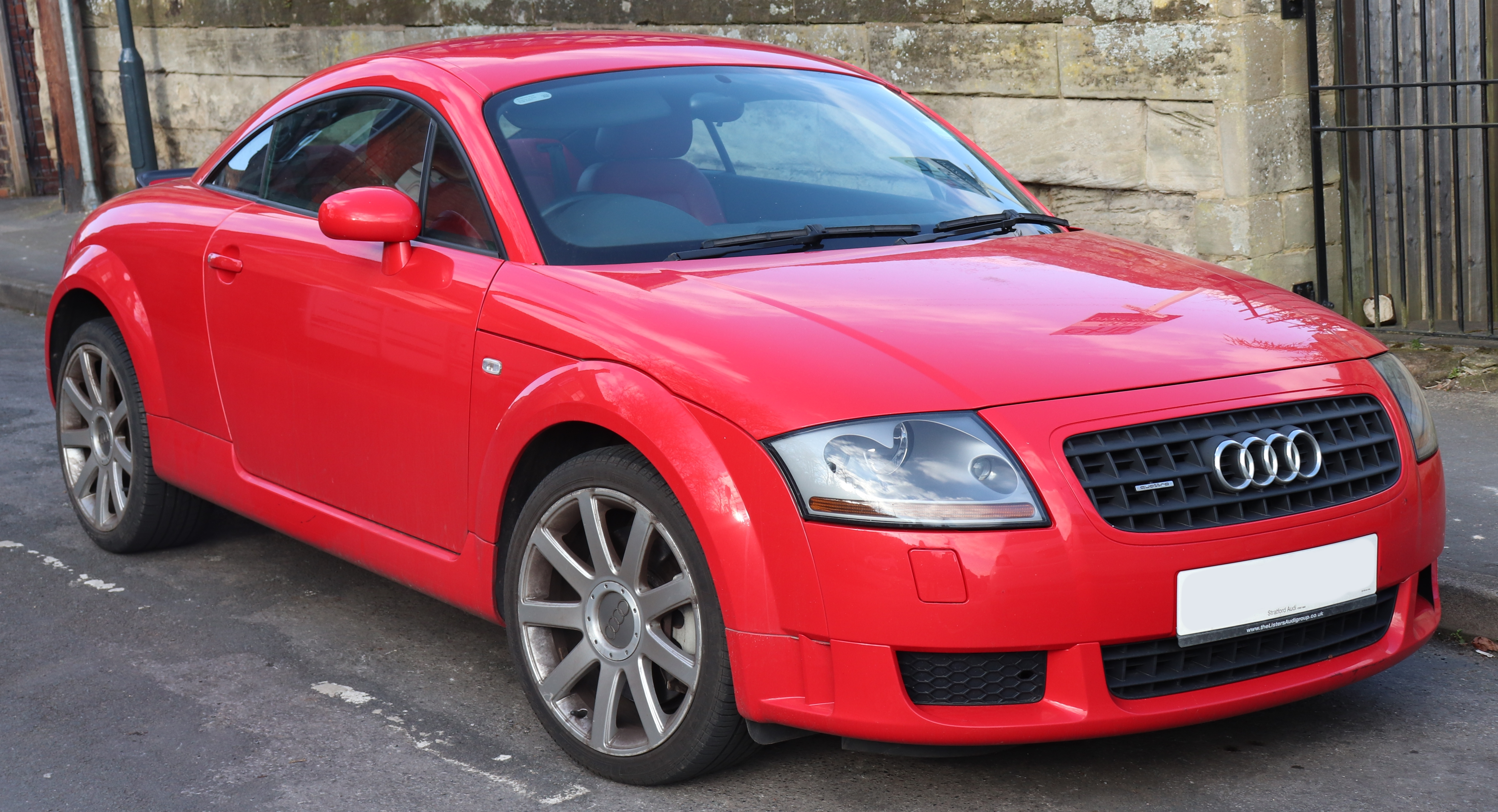

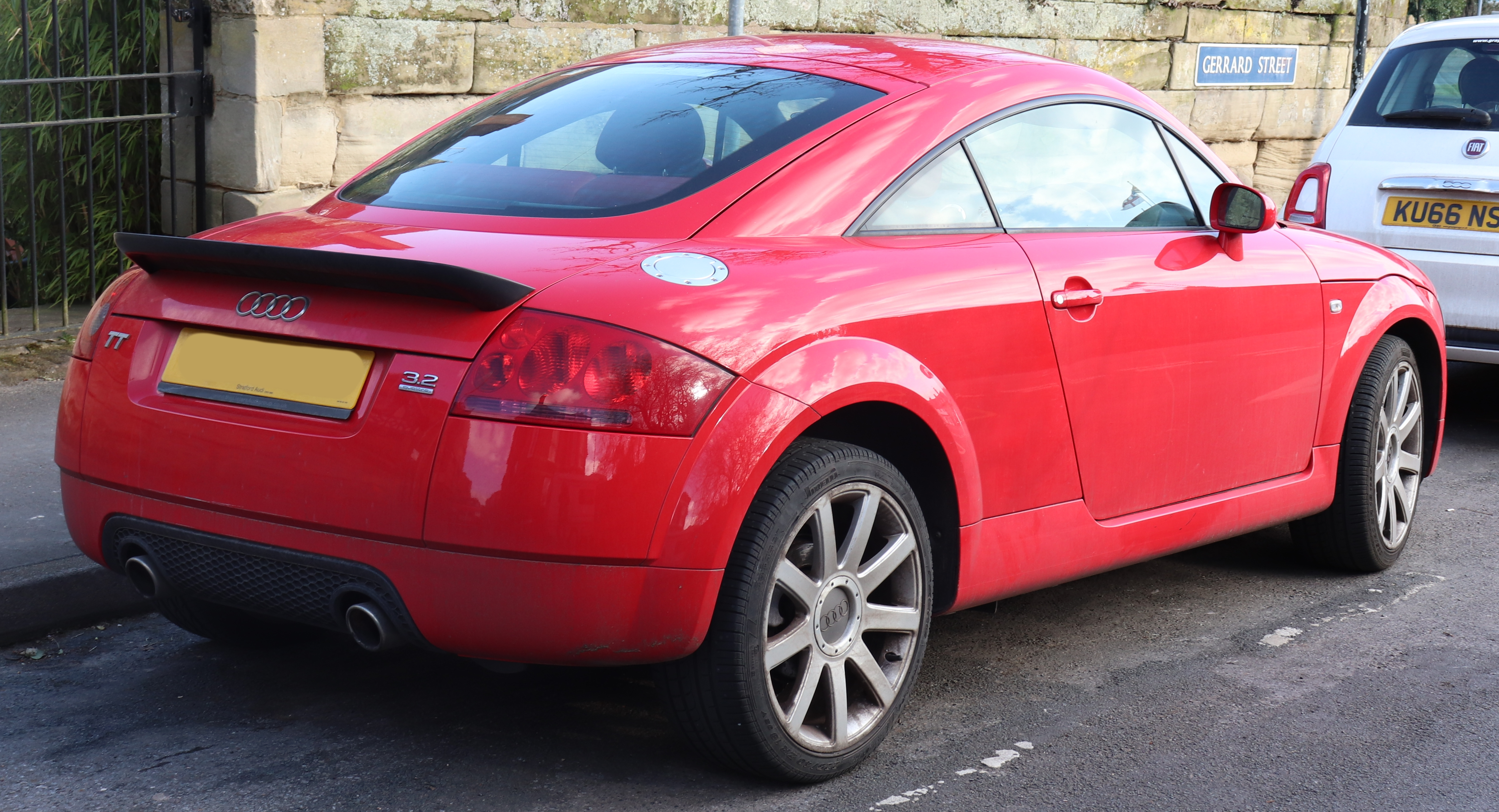
Audi TT Quattro facelift

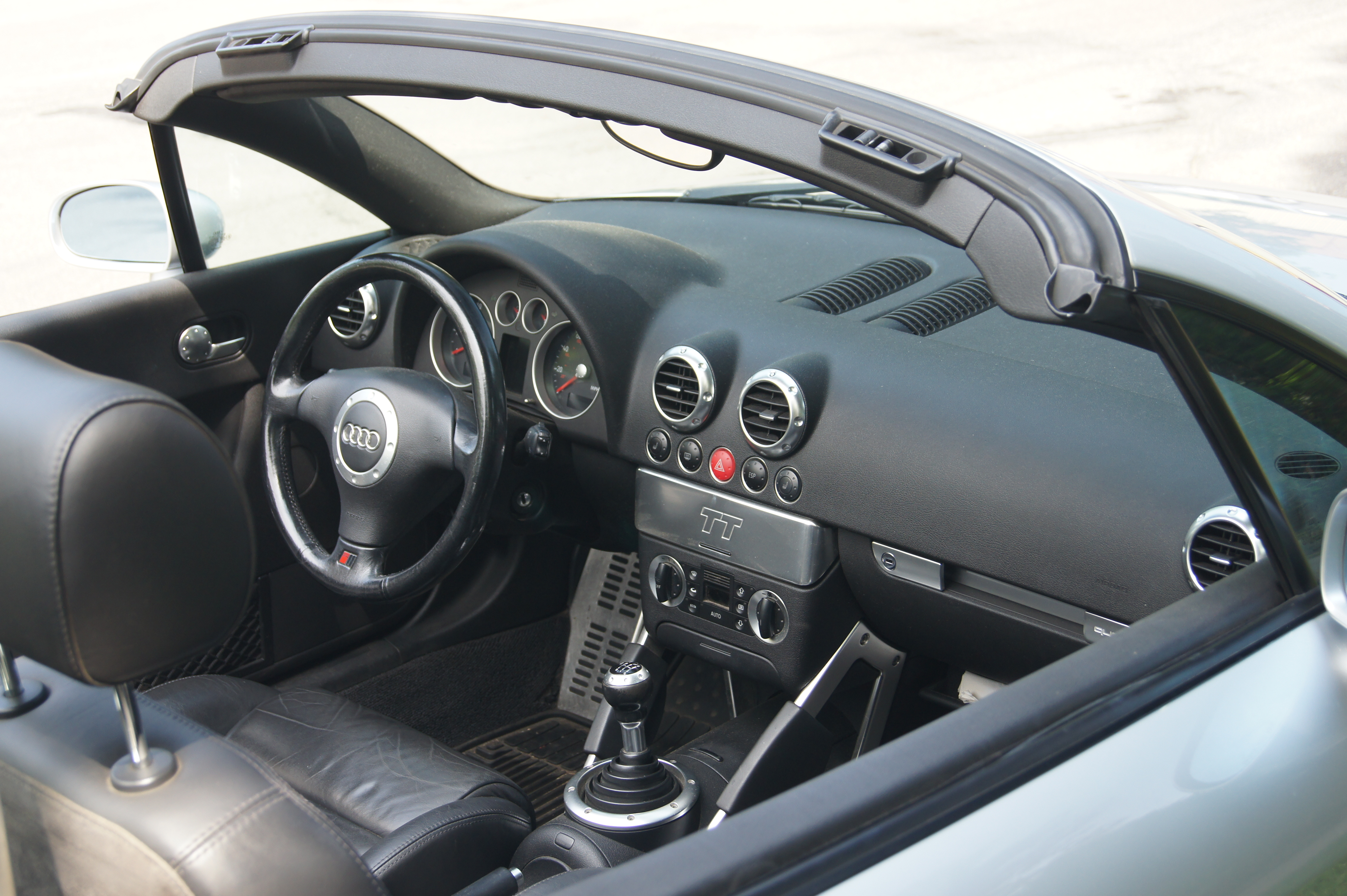
Interior

The production model (internal designation Type 8N) was launched as a coupé in September 1998, followed by a roadster in August 1999. It is based on the Volkswagen Group A4 (PQ34) platform as used for the Volkswagen Golf Mk4, the original Audi A3, the Škoda Octavia, and others. The styling differed little from the concept, except for slightly reprofiled bumpers, and the addition of rear quarterlight windows behind the doors. Factory production commenced in October 1998.

Early TTs were cited in a series of fatalities from accidents involving speeds over 112 mph (180 km/h), abrupt lane changes or sharp turns. Both the coupé and roadster variants were recalled in late 1999/early 2000, to improve the car's handling predictability at very high speeds. Audi's Electronic Stability Programme (ESP) or Anti Slip Regulation (ASR) were added, as well as a rear spoiler, along with modifications to the suspension system. All changes were incorporated into subsequent production.

The Audi TT was nominated for the North American Car of the Year award for 2000 and made Car and Driver magazine's Ten Best list for 2000 and 2001. By 2003, Audi revised the TT, with a number of small styling and practicality improvements.

Production of the first generation (Type 8N) ended in June 2006.

=== Powertrain ===
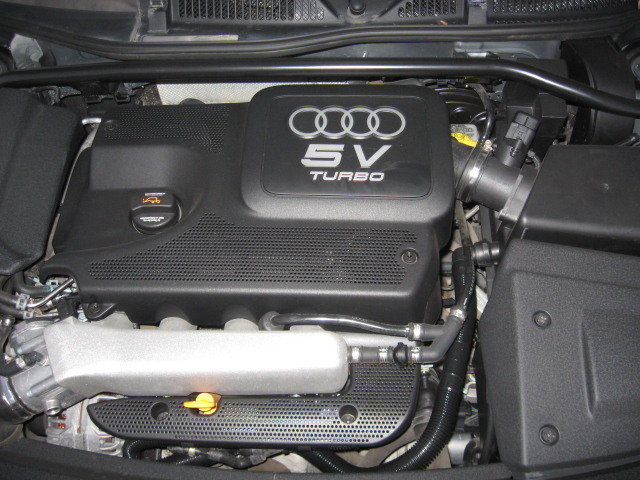
The 1.8 L turbocharged inline-4 engine

Mechanically, the TT shared an identical powertrain layout with other Volkswagen Group cars. The TT uses a transversely mounted internal combustion engine, with either front-wheel drive or 'quattro four-wheel drive' available as an option. It was first available with a 1.8-litre inline four-cylinder 20-valve turbocharged engine in two states of DIN-rated power outputs; 180 PS (132 kW; 178 hp) and 225 PS (165 kW; 222 hp). The engines share the same fundamental design, but the 225 PS version features a larger K04 turbocharger (180 PS version came with a smaller K03), an additional intercooler on the left side (complementing the existing right-side intercooler), larger 20mm wrist-pins, a dual tailpipe exhaust, intake manifold with inlet on driver's side, and a few other internals – designed to accommodate the increase in turbo boost, from roughly 10 pounds per square inch (0.7 bar) peak, to 15 pounds per square inch (1.0 bar). Haldex Traction enabled four-wheel drive, branded "Quattro", was optional on the 180 engine and standard on the more powerful 225 version.

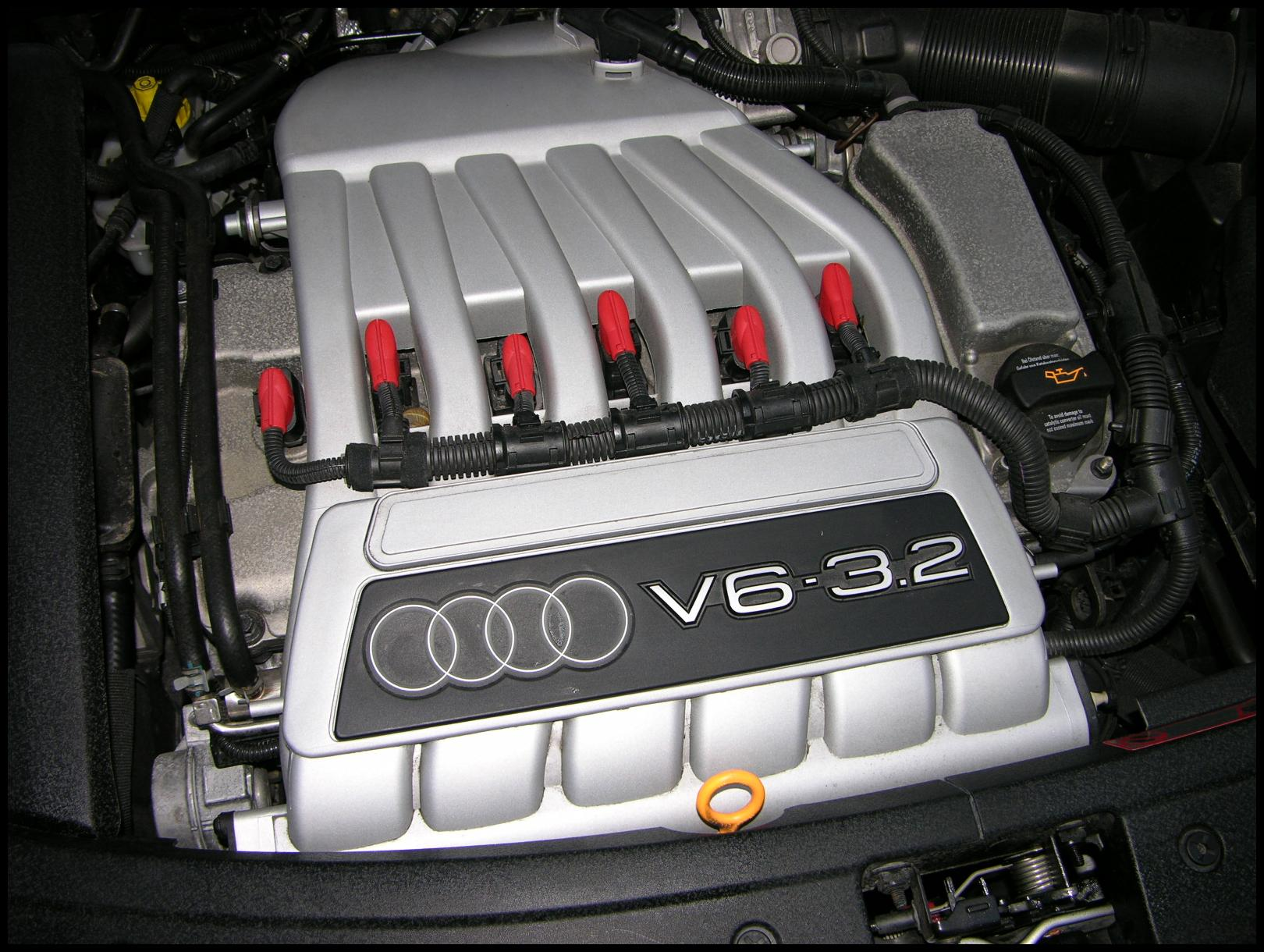
3.2 L VR6 engine

The original four-cylinder engine range was complemented with a 3,189 cc (3.2 L; 194.6 cu in) VR6 engine rated at 250 PS (247 bhp; 184 kW) and 320 N⋅m (236 lb⋅ft) of torque in early 2003, which came as standard with the quattro four-wheel-drive system. In July 2003, a new six-speed dual clutch transmission – dubbed the Direct-Shift Gearbox (DSG), which improves acceleration through much-reduced shift times, was offered, along with a stiffer suspension.

=== Aerodynamics ===
According to Audi Head of Design Marc Lichte, the curved outline and rounded bodywork of the Mk1 TT's design was inspired by Bauhaus. This simplified curved shape was unusual at the time. The drag coefficient of the original TT is 0.35, which is similar to its competitors such as the BMW Z4 and the Mazda MX-5.

However, the TT was involved in a number of high-speed accidents which were attributed to aerodynamic instability at high speeds. To solve these issues, Audi added modified control arms and firmer shock absorbers on both the front and rear suspension as well as a rear spoiler.

=== TT quattro Sport ===
In 2005, Audi released the Coupé-only limited edition. Just 1,165 were produced. 800 with steering wheel on the right side, 365 with steering wheel on the left side. (900 sold in the UK, not the 1,000 originally planned) Audi TT quattro Sport (known as the Audi TT Club Sport in Europe) or TT QS. Built by AUDI AG's high-performance specialist subsidiary quattro GmbH, it had increased power from its 1.8-litre turbocharged engine – rising to 240 PS (177 kW; 237 hp) and 320 N⋅m (236 lbf⋅ft) of torque – and a reduction in weight of 75 kg (165 lb) to 1,390 kg (3,064 lb), which allowed for a 0–62 mph (0–100 km/h) time of 5.9 seconds, and an electronically limited top speed of 155 mph (249 km/h).

This weight reduction was achieved by removing the spare wheel, rear harmonic damper, rear parcel shelf and rear seats, and the standard fitment air conditioning. The main battery was also relocated to the rear of the vehicle in order to maintain weight distribution as much as possible. Lightweight fixed-back Recaro bucket seats graced the interior. Distinguishable from other TT Coupés by its two-tone paint scheme (Phantom Black pearl painted roof, pillars and mirror housings, in combination with either Avus Silver, Phantom Black, Mauritius Blue or Misano Red body colour) and unique 18" 15-spoke cast aluminium alloy wheels, plus the same body kit as fitted to the TT 3.2 V6, the TT quattro Sport also featured black exhaust tailpipes and uprated suspension settings and new wheels, 1/2 in (13 mm) wider at the rear for improved handling. The brochure stated V6-spec brakes were to be fitted, however models delivered in the UK came with the standard 225 spec brake callipers which were red-painted.

=== 8N engines ===
The 8N powertrain options consist of the following engines and drivelines:

model	engine displacement	engine configuration	Max. power at rpm (Directive 80/1269/EEC)	max. torque at rpm	engine ID code(s)	years	drivetrain
All petrol engines all with multi-point sequential indirect fuel injection
1.8 T	1,781 cc (108.7 cu in)	Inline-4 20v DOHC; Turbocharger	150 PS (110 kW; 148 hp) at 5,800	210 N⋅m (155 lbf⋅ft) at 1,750–4,600	AUM	2002– 2006	FWD
1.8 T	1,781 cc (108.7 cu in)	Inline-4 20v DOHC; Turbocharger	163 PS (120 kW; 161 hp) at 5,700	225 N⋅m (166 lbf⋅ft) at 1,950–4,700	BVP	2006	FWD
1.8 T	1,781 cc (108.7 cu in)	Inline-4 20v DOHC; Turbocharger	180 PS (132 kW; 178 hp) at 5,500	235 N⋅m (173 lbf⋅ft) at 1,950–5,000	AJQ, AUQ, ARY, APP, AWP, ATC	1998– 2006	FWD
1.8 T quattro	1,781 cc (108.7 cu in)	Inline-4 20v DOHC; Turbocharger	180 PS (132 kW; 178 hp) at 5,500	235 N⋅m (173 lbf⋅ft) at 1,950–5,000	AJQ, AUQ, ARY, APP, AWP, ATC	1998– 2006	Haldex 4WD
1.8 T	1,781 cc (108.7 cu in)	Inline-4 20v DOHC; Turbocharger	190 PS (140 kW; 187 hp) at 5,700	250 N⋅m (184 lbf⋅ft) at 1,950–4,700	BVR	2006	FWD
1.8 T quattro	1,781 cc (108.7 cu in)	Inline-4 20v DOHC; Turbocharger	225 PS (165 kW; 222 hp) at 5,900	280 N⋅m (207 lbf⋅ft) at 2,200–5,500	AMU, APX, BAM, BEA	1998– 2005	Haldex 4WD
1.8 T quattro Sport	1,781 cc (108.7 cu in)	Inline-4 20v DOHC; Turbocharger	240 PS (177 kW; 237 hp) at 5,700	320 N⋅m (236 lbf⋅ft) at 2,300–5,000	BFV	2005– 2006	Haldex 4WD
3.2 VR6 quattro	3,189 cc (194.6 cu in)	VR6 24v DOHC	250 PS (184 kW; 247 hp) at 6,300	320 N⋅m (236 lbf⋅ft) at 2,500–3,000	BHE	2003– 2006	Haldex 4WD

=== Lawsuits ===
In June 2007, a class action lawsuit was filed against Volkswagen Group of America, alleging the timing belts for model year 1999–2003 Audi and Volkswagen vehicles equipped with a 1.8-litre turbocharged engine failed prematurely. The complaint alleged that the timing belts failed prior to the owner's manual's service interval. The parties reached a class-wide settlement, with preliminary approval of the settlement granted in May 2008.

In May 2008, a class action suit reached a nationwide settlement regarding allegedly defective instrument clusters on 2000–2004, and 2005 model year Audi TTs. Owners were entitled to submit claims for repairs, replacement and/or cash reimbursement for out-of-pocket expenses and received a two-year instrument cluster warranty extension.

=== Safety ===
ANCAP test results* Audi TT Roadster (2003)
Test	Score
Overall	4 /5 stars
Frontal offset	11.94/16
Side impact	14.60/16
Pole	1/2
Seat belt reminders	0/3
Whiplash protection	Not Assessed
Pedestrian protection	Poor
Electronic stability control	Standard

=== 2.7T Quattro gmbH Concept ===
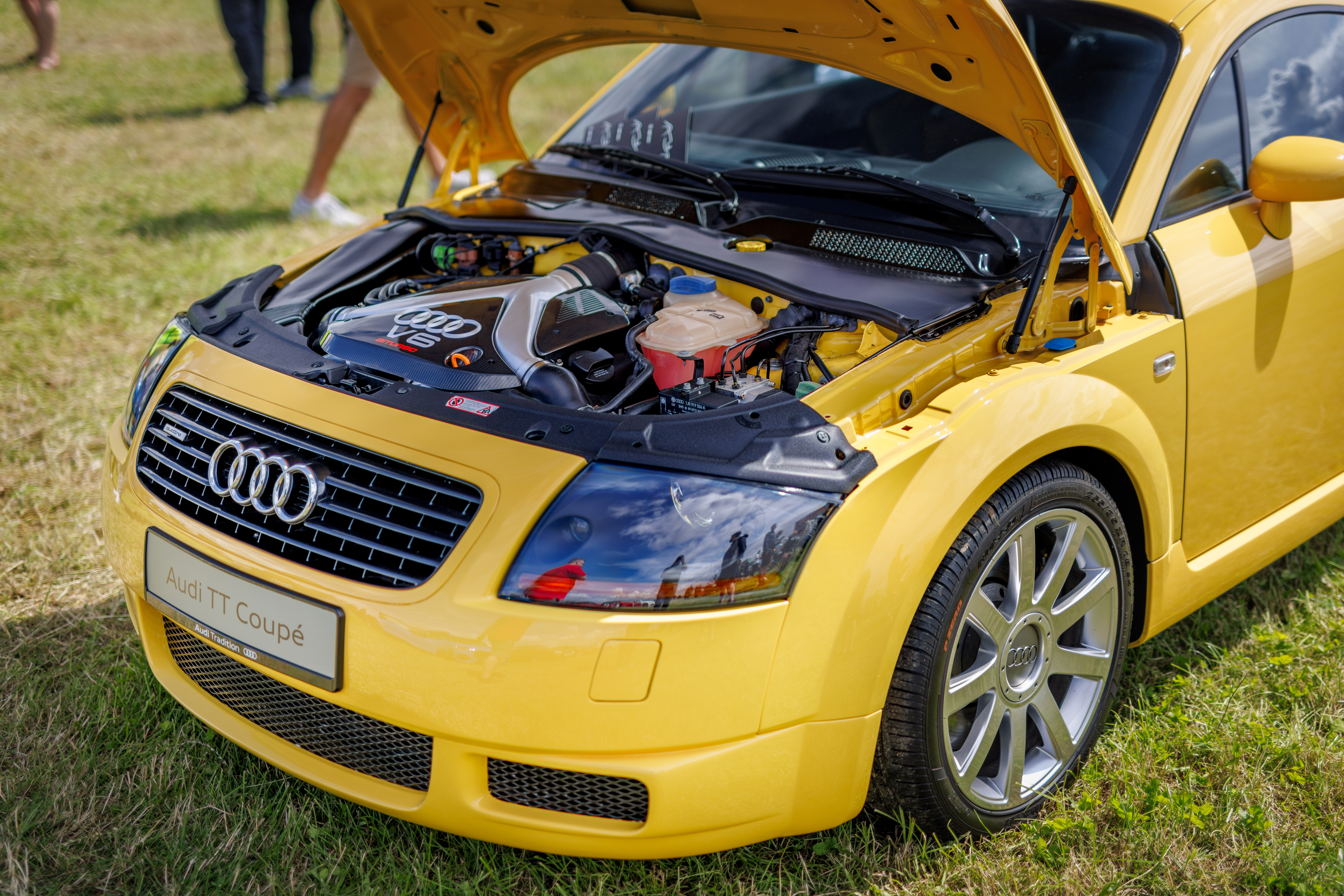
The concept 2.7T Audi TT on display at an event in the UK in 2023, showing the Bi-Turbo V6 power plant

For the 30th anniversary Quattro gmbH unveiled an Imola Yellow TT that sported a 2.7 L Bi-Turbo V6 engine from a B5 Audi RS4 that produced 280 kW (381 PS; 375 hp) and 440 N⋅m (325 lb⋅ft) at 2,500 rpm which was manufactured in 2001. This was accomplished by using a B5 RS4 donor car, which included engine, transmission, rear differential, axles, brakes, and wheels from a B5 Avant. Using the RS4 drivetrain, Audi had the ability to utilize a Torsen based 6-speed Quattro manual transmission in a car that is normally using a transverse engine layout and Haldex based all wheel drive system.

== TT Mk2 (Type 8J, 2006–2014) ==
Second generation (8J)
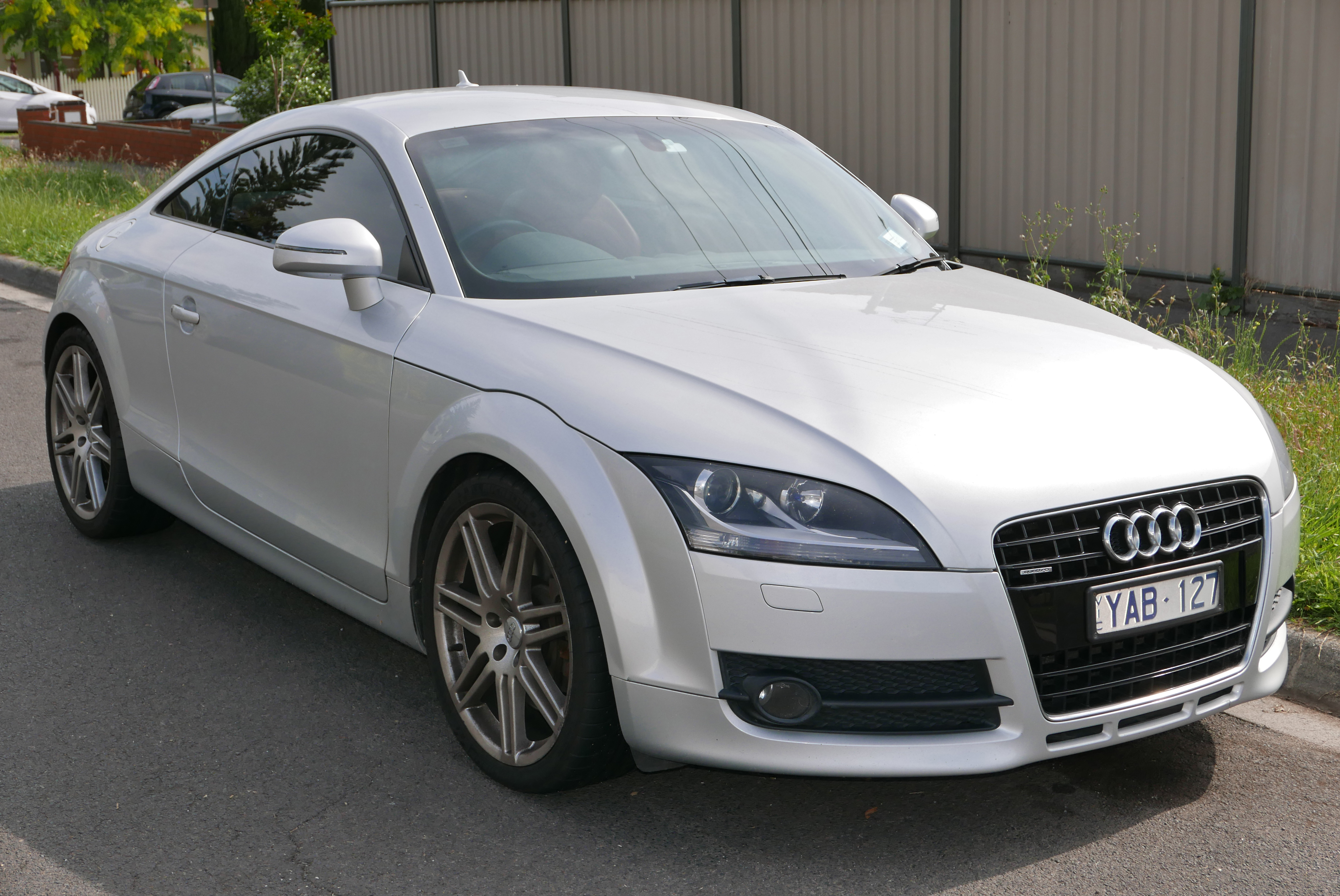

Overview
- Production: Coupé: April 2006 – March 2014; Roadster: November 2006 – March 2014
- Designer: Walter de'Silva

Body and chassis
- Platform: Volkswagen Group A5 (PQ35)
- Related: Audi A3 (Second Generation); Volkswagen Golf Mk5; Volkswagen Jetta (Fifth Generation); SEAT León (Second Generation); SEAT Toledo (Third Generation); SEAT Altea; Škoda Octavia (Second Generation)

Powertrain
- Engine: 1.8 L TFSI I4; 2.0 L TFSI I4; 2.5 L TFSI I5 (TT RS); 3.2 L VR6; 2.0 L TDI CR diesel I4
- Transmission: 6-speed manual 6-speed S tronic

Dimensions
- Wheelbase: 2,468 mm (97.2 in)
- Length: 4,178 mm (164.5 in); TTS & TT RS: 4,198 mm (165.3 in)
- Width: 1,842 mm (72.5 in)
- Height: 1,352 mm (53.2 in); TTS: 1,345 mm (53.0 in); TT RS: 1,342 mm (52.8 in); S Convertible: 53.5 in (1,359 mm); Convertible: 53.5 in (1,359 mm)
- Kerb weight: 1,260–1,490 kg (2,778–3,285 lb)

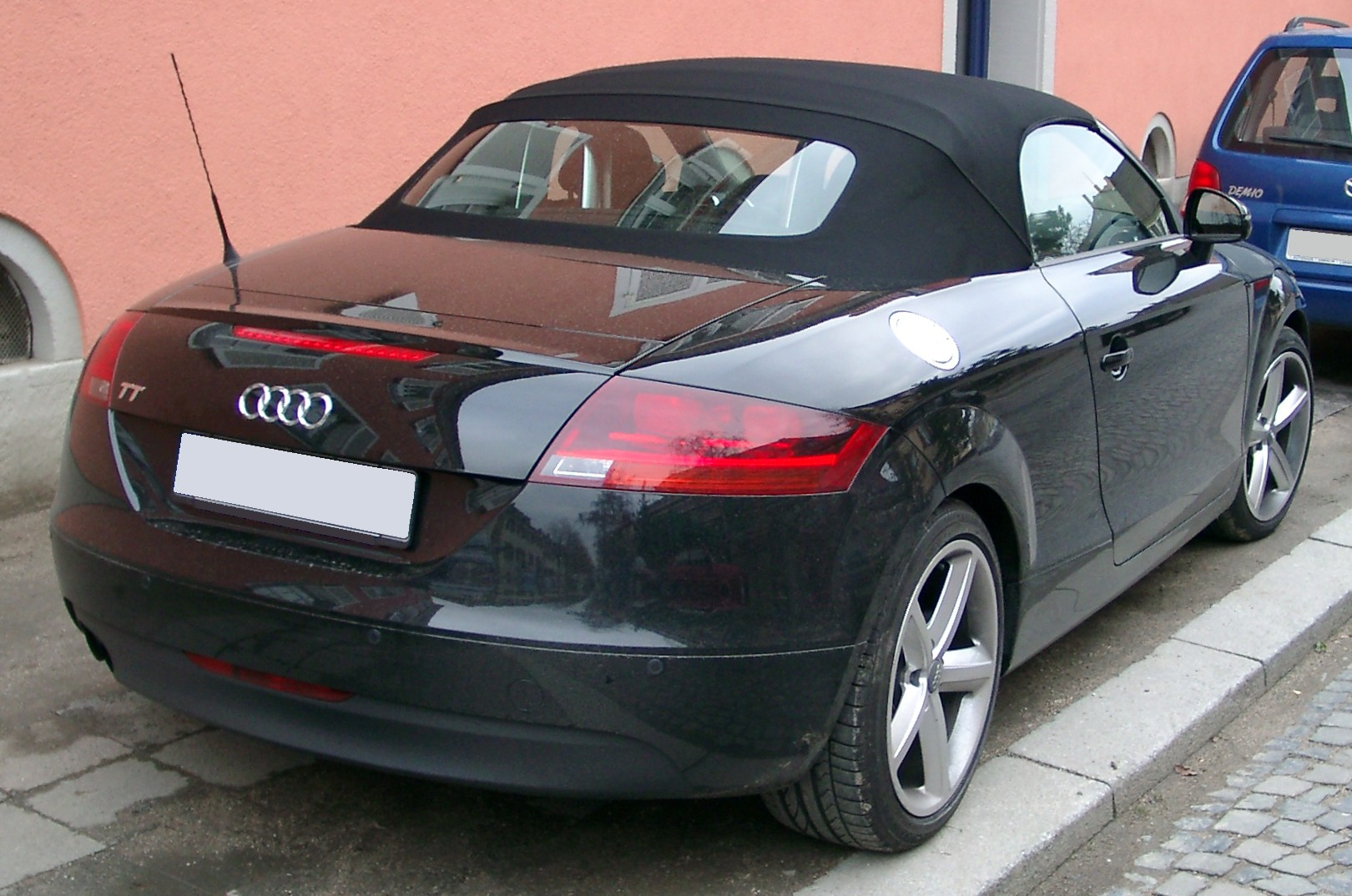
Roadster (pre-facelift)

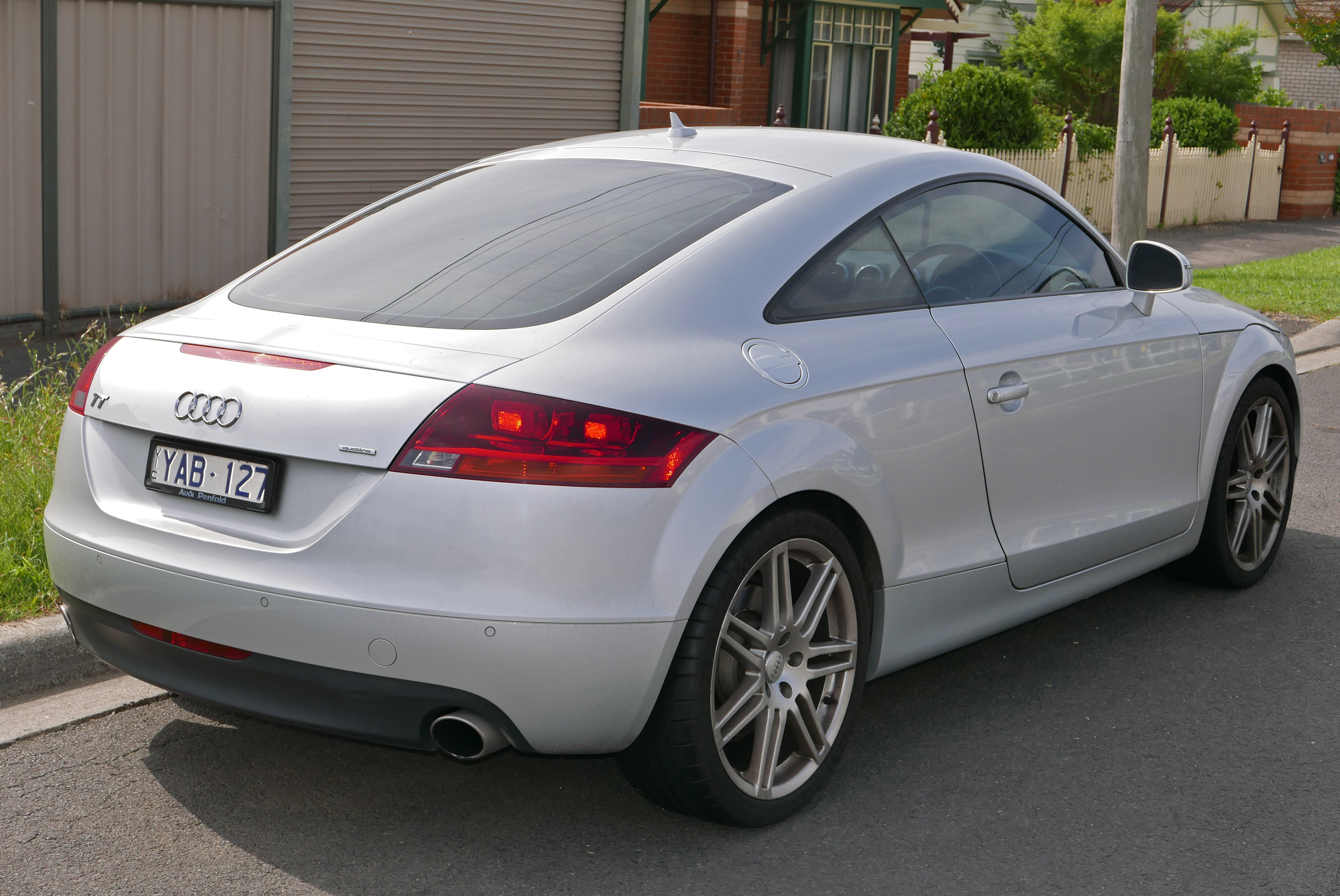
Coupé (pre-facelift)

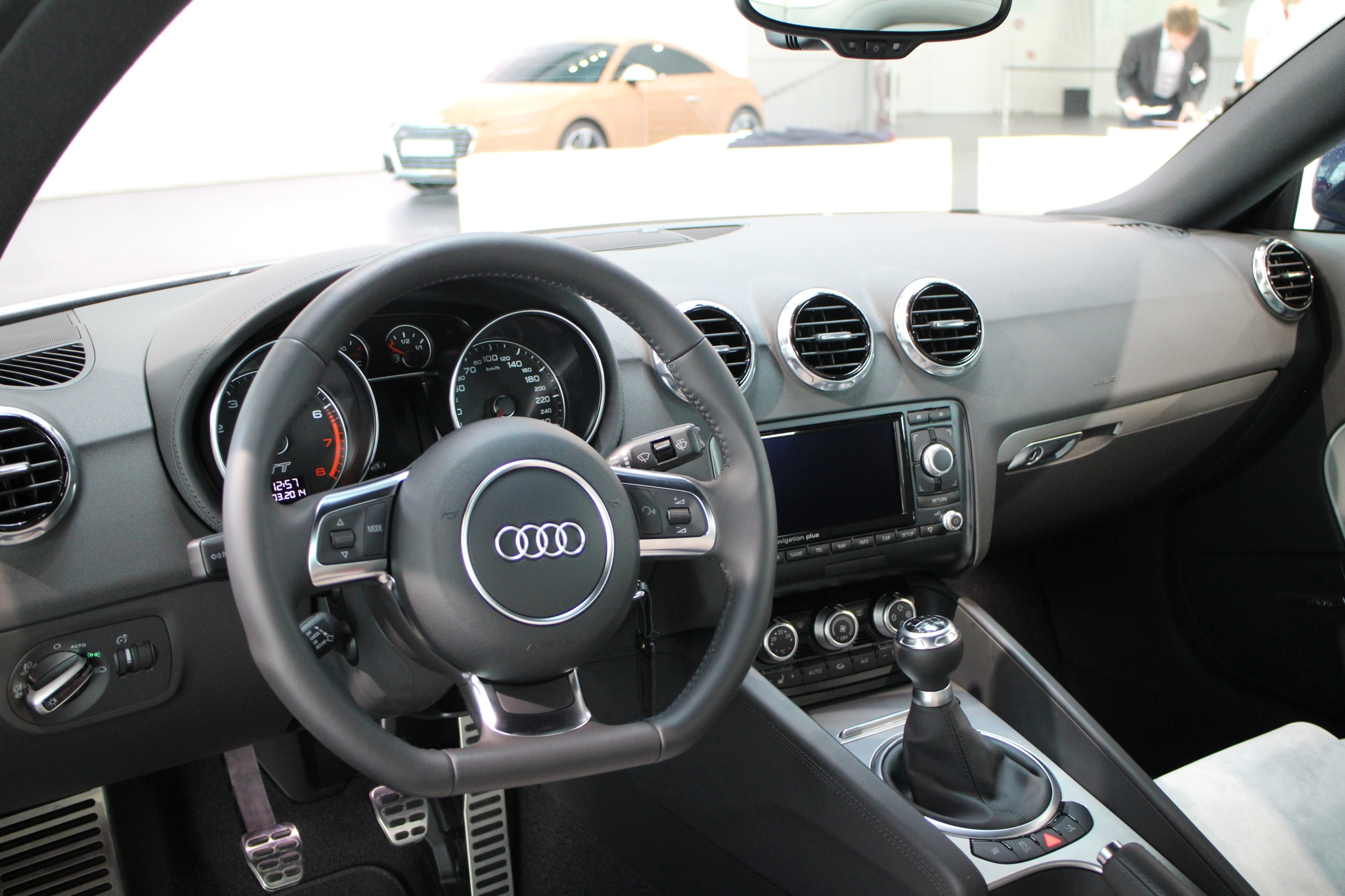
Interior

In August 2004, Audi announced that the next generation TT would be manufactured using aluminium, and would go into production in 2007. A preview of the second-generation TT was provided in the form of the Audi Shooting Brake concept car, shown at the Tokyo Motor Show in 2005. This concept was an insight into the new TT, but featured angular styling, and a "shooting-brake" two-door hatchback body style.

Audi debuted the second-generation TT, internal designation Type 8J, on 6 April 2006, using the Volkswagen Group A5 (PQ35) platform with aluminium front bodypanels, and steel in the rear, to enhance its near-neutral front-to-rear weight distribution. Available in front-wheel drive or "quattro" four-wheel drive layout, the TT was again offered as a 2+2 Coupé, and as a two-seater Roadster. The second generation was five inches longer and three inches wider than its predecessor. Factory production commenced during August 2006.

=== 8J powertrain ===
The powertrain options initially only included petrol engines, which consist of either one of two inline four-cylinder engines – the new 1.8-litre EA888 Turbocharged Fuel Stratified Injection (TFSI) (available initially only in Germany, later elsewhere from mid 2009), or the more common and established EA113-variant 2.0-litre TFSI. The Fuel Stratified Injection (FSI) technology was derived from the Audi Le Mans endurance race cars, and offers improved fuel efficiency as well as an increased power output and cleaner emissions. The 3.2-litre 'V6' badged VR6 engine was carried over from the previous generation. 2.0 TFSI quattro models, with the latest EA888 engine, became available in 2009 model year.

A six-speed manual transmission is standard, with the six-speed Direct-Shift Gearbox (now called "S-TRONIC" on all Audi models) as an option for all engines. Quattro on-demand four-wheel drive, again using the Haldex Traction clutch is available – standard on V6 models, but not available on the 1.8 TFSI.

=== 8J suspension and other features ===
Like all its PQ35 platform-mates, the 8J TT has a multi-link fully independent rear suspension to complement the front independent suspension. The entire suspension system can be enhanced with Audi's new active suspension, "Audi Magnetic Ride", available as an option. This is based on BWI Group's MagneRide, which uses magneto rheological dampers (this means that an electronic control unit for the suspension will automatically adjust its damping properties depending on the current road conditions and driving manner).

The new TT also features a revised rear spoiler which preserves the clean aesthetics of the TT when not raised. The spoiler automatically deploys at 125 km/h (78 mph) to increase down-force, and retracts again below 80 km/h (50 mph). The spoiler can be manually controlled via a switch on the lower centre console. Manual operation by the switch reverts to automatic operation (i.e.: manual mode is cancelled) if the vehicle speed rises above the stated limit.

=== 2.0 TDI quattro ===
Launched at the 2008 Geneva Motor Show, Audi offered the first diesel engined version of the Audi TT in the European market, the Audi TT 2.0 TDI quattro. As its name indicates, it is only available with four-wheel-drive, and is also available in Coupé and Roadster versions. Power comes from the new 2.0-litre Turbocharged Direct Injection (TDI) engine, now with 16 valves, double overhead camshaft (DOHC), 1.8-bar (30 psi) common rail fuel delivery and eight-hole piezo fuel injectors, which produces a DIN-rated output of 125 kW (170 PS; 168 bhp) at 4,200 rpm and torque of 350 N⋅m (258 lbf⋅ft) at 1,750 to 2,500 rpm. It includes a six-speed manual transmission.

Acceleration from standstill to 100 km/h (62.1 mph) on the Coupé is achieved in 7.5 seconds, and it will go on to reach a top speed of 226 km/h (140.4 mph). The slightly less aerodynamically efficient Roadster reaches 100 km/h (62 mph) in 7.7 seconds, with a top speed of 223 km/h (138.6 mph).

Audi claims average fuel consumption for the Coupé variant with this 2.0 TDI engine is 5.3 litres per 100 kilometres (53.3 mpg_{‑imp}; 44.4 mpg_{‑US}), which achieves a CO_{2} emissions rating of 139 gram/km. The Roadster TDI achieves an average 5.5 litres per 100 kilometres (51.4 mpg_{‑imp}; 42.8 mpg_{‑US}) and CO_{2} of 144 gram/km.

=== TT Competition ===
As an additional package a standard Audi TT can be bought from factory with a special body kit upgrade to make it look like the Audi TT-RS version. The upgrade includes a fixed rear spoiler and Alcantara/leather sports seats (Silk Nappa, Fine Nappa leather optional).

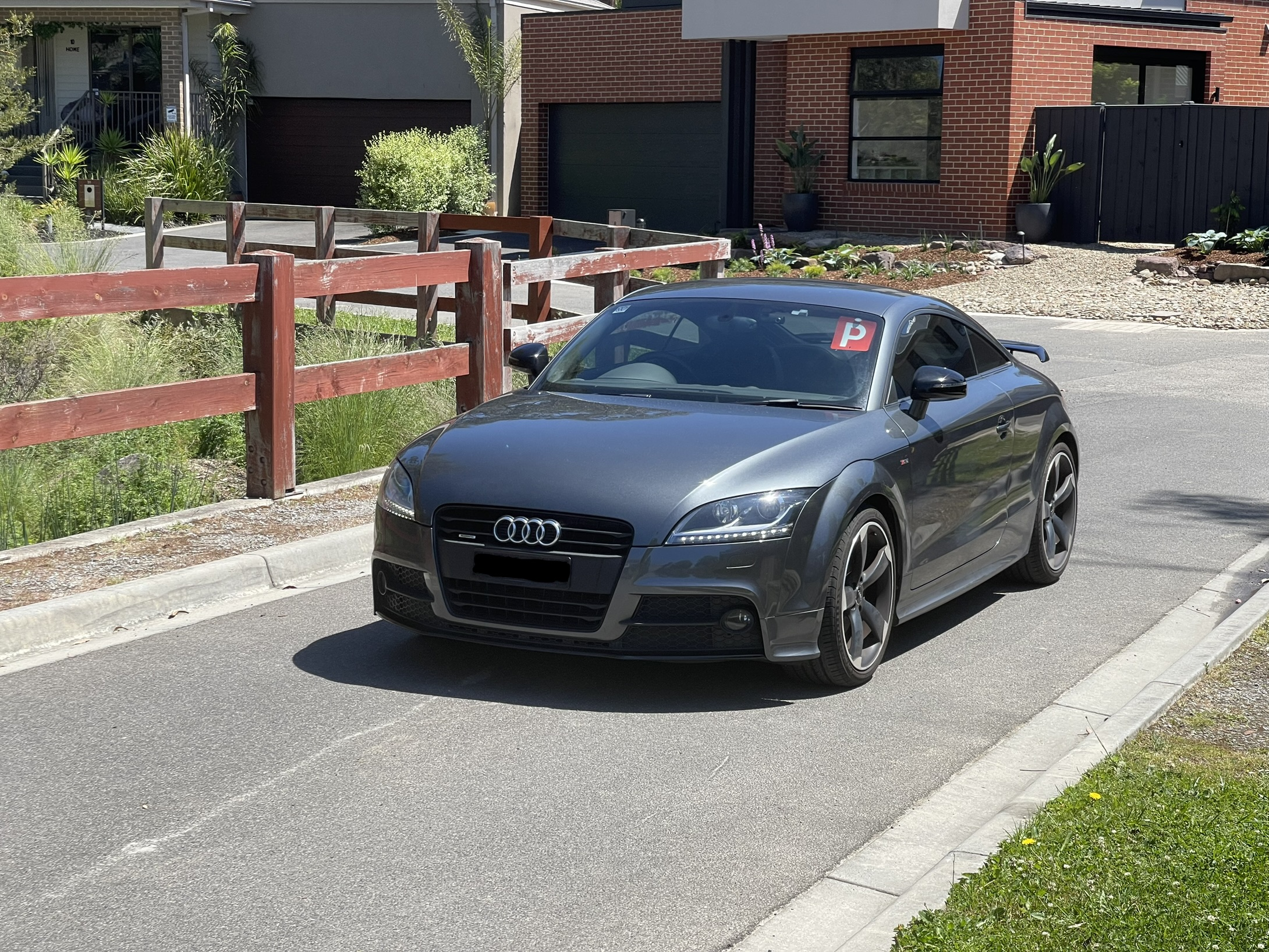
Audi TT Competition

=== TTS ===
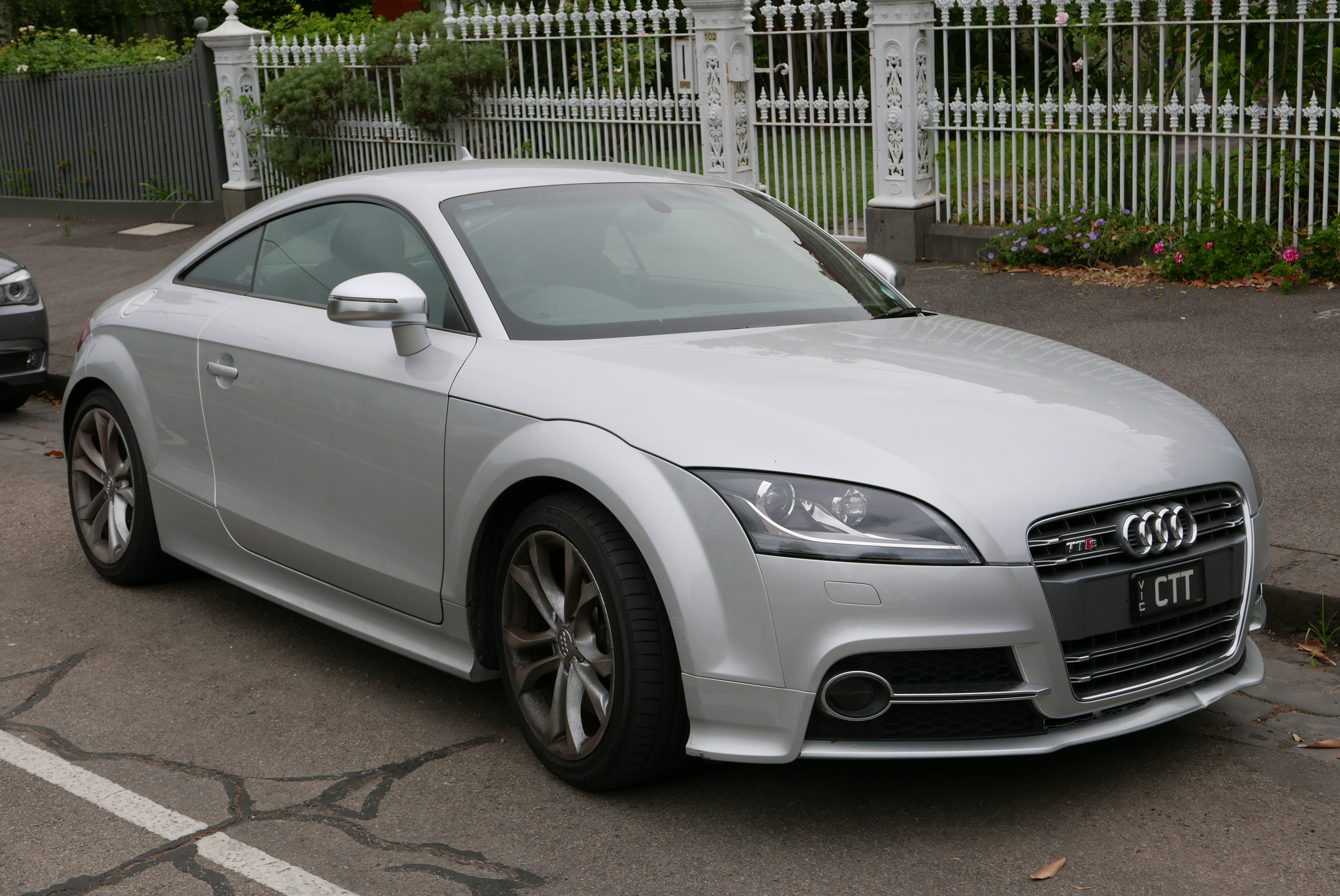
TTS Coupé (Australia; facelift)

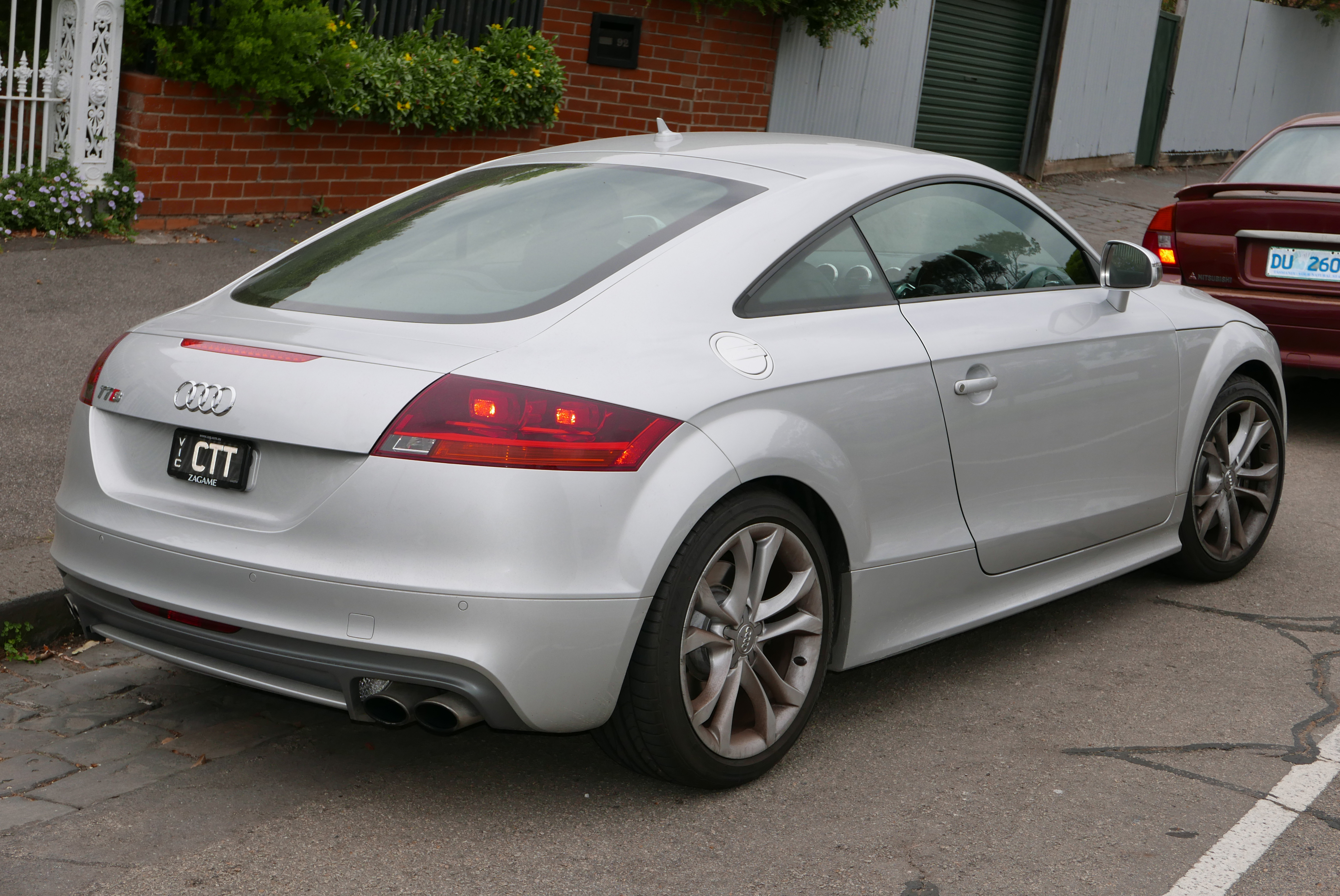
TTS Coupé (Australia; facelift)

At the 2008 North American International Auto Show (NAIAS) in Detroit, Audi released the first Audi "S" model of the TT range – the Audi TTS quattro, with a heavily revised 2.0 TFSI engine. The cylinder block, cylinder head and the fuel injectors have all been modified from the base 2.0 TFSI engine (ID: CDL). Together with other modifications, this engine produces a DIN-rated power output of 200 kW (272 PS; 268 hp), and generates a torque of 350 N⋅m (258 lbf⋅ft) from 2,500 to 5,000 rpm.

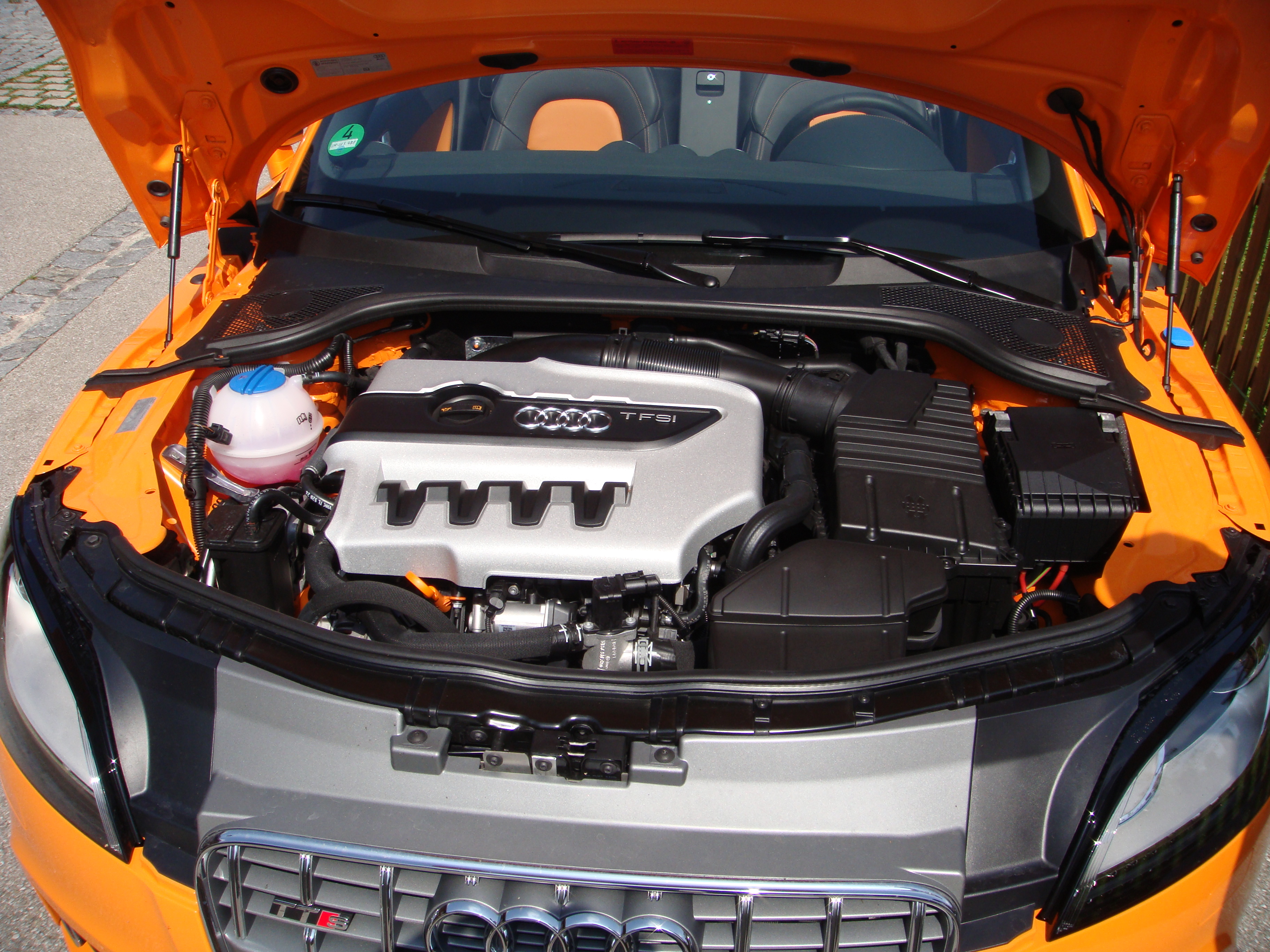
The 2.0 L TFSI Inline-four engine

It was available with a choice of either a six-speed close-ratio manual transmission, or a six-speed 'S tronic' transmission. In the United States, the S tronic gearbox was the only available transmission. Like all Audi "S" models, it was only available with four-wheel drive as standard.

The suspension was lowered by 10 millimetres (0.4 in) over the standard models, and includes "Audi Magnetic Ride" as standard and a new two-stage sports-biased Electronic Stability Programme (ESP). Radially ventilated front disc brakes are clamped by a single-piston gloss black caliper emblazoned with a bold TTS logo, and a lap timer is prominent in the centre of the instrument cluster. 9Jx18" '5-parallel-spoke' design alloy wheels are standard, with 245/40 ZR18 high-performance tyres. 19" '5-spoke star' wheels and tyres are optional. The exterior has some changes over the standard model – with a TTS body styling: with redesigned front, with larger air intakes, redesigned rear bumper, side sill extensions, and four exhaust tailpipes.

Official performance figures include a 0-100 km/h (0–62 mph) acceleration time of 5.2 seconds, with the Roadster four-tenths slower at 5.6 seconds.[31] Top speed is electronically limited to 250 km/h (155 mph).

Audi UK offered eight TTS cars for official use by the race organisers at the 2008 Isle of Man TT motorcycle races.

The car went on sale in the US at November 2008.

In 2014, at the International Motor Show in Geneva, Audi unveiled the new TTS model for the 2016 model year, alongside the standard 2016 Audi TT model. Both models were planned to go on sale in the beginning of 2015.

=== TT Clubsport quattro concept ===
Audi displayed a new show car variant of the second generation Audi TT – the Audi TT Clubsport quattro, at the 2008 Wörthersee Tour at Pörtschach am Wörthersee in Austria. Shown only in an open-topped "speedster" variant, its 2.0 TFSI engine has been tuned to give 221 kW (300 PS; 296 bhp). The soft-top on the standard TT Roadster has been deleted, and replaced with two "humps", along with two substantial roll bars. LED daytime running lamps, an aggressive body kit with large frontal air intakes, black-painted "single frame grille" and a lower spoiler lip complete the new look from the front. The axle track has been widened by 66 millimetres (2.6 in), with bolder and wider wheel arch extensions, polished 19-inch alloys, wider side sills and 255-section tyres are the highlight of the side profile. At the rear, twin polished stainless steel oval tail pipes exit aside a new rear diffuser.

Racing bucket seats, along with lightweight aluminium detail complete the interior look, and a six-speed S tronic dual-clutch transmission with quattro four-wheel drive and TTS spec brakes (340 mm (13.4 in) up front, and 310 mm (12.2 in) at the rear) complete the mechanicals.

Whilst the TT Clubsport quattro is primarily a "show car", Audi has not ruled out the possibility of small-scale production.

=== TT RS ===
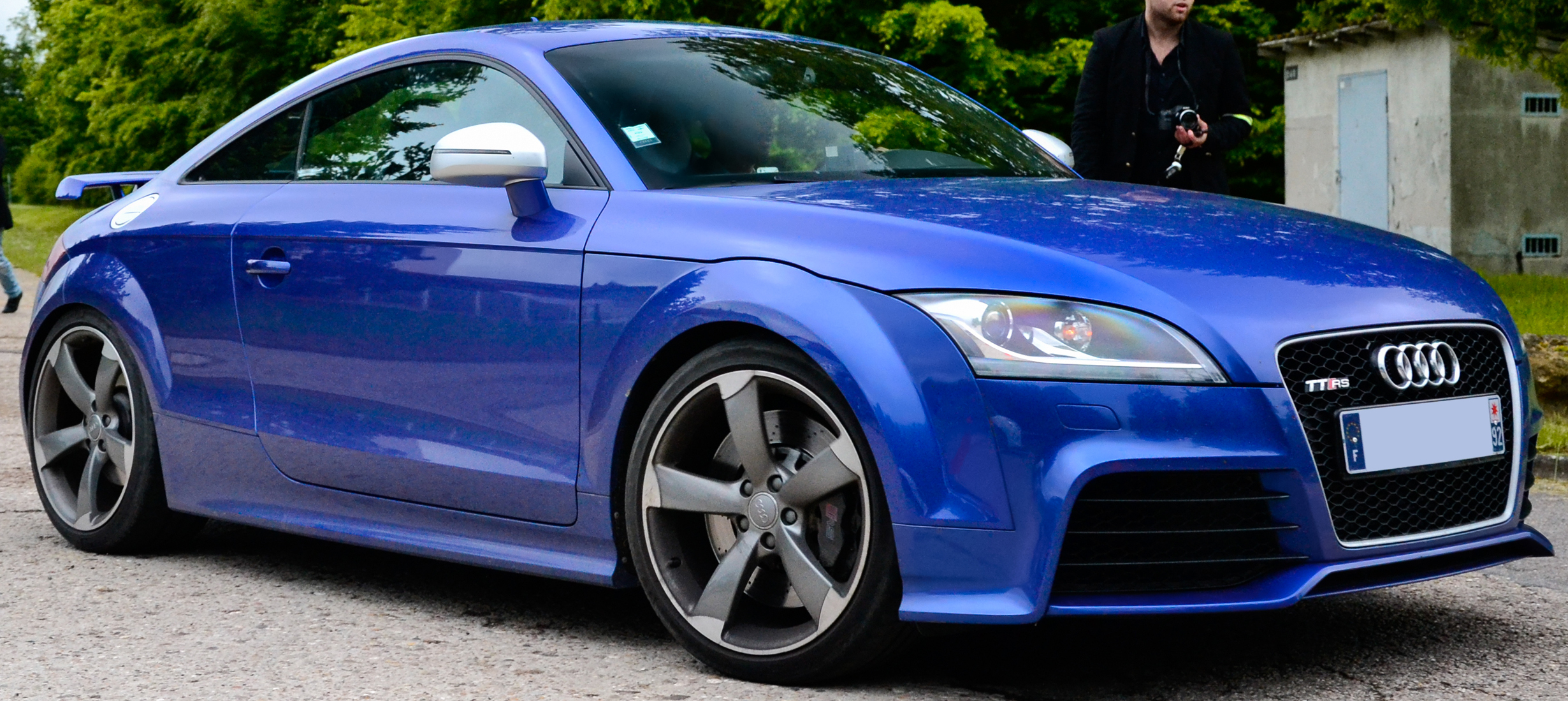
Audi TT RS

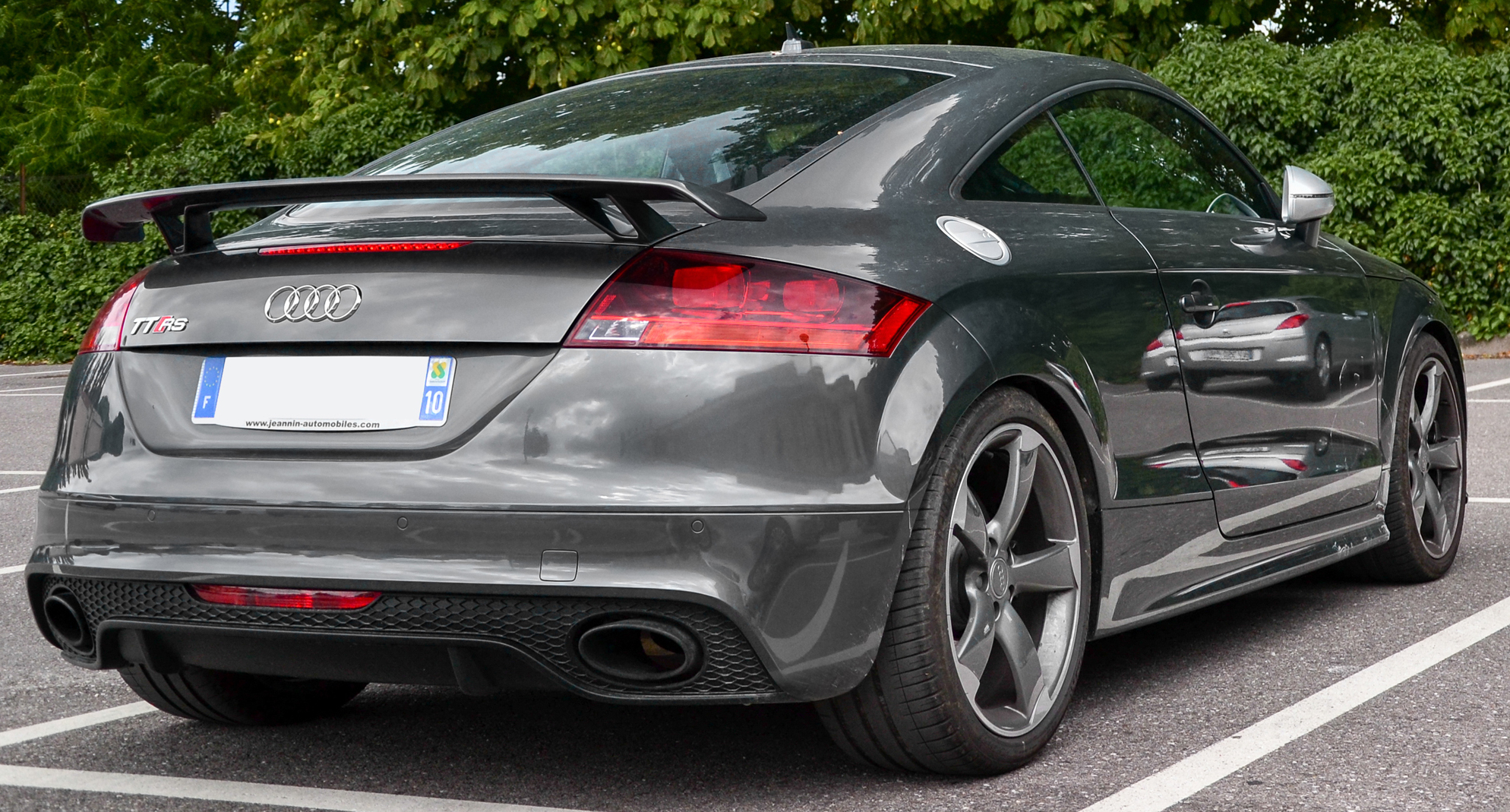
Audi TT RS

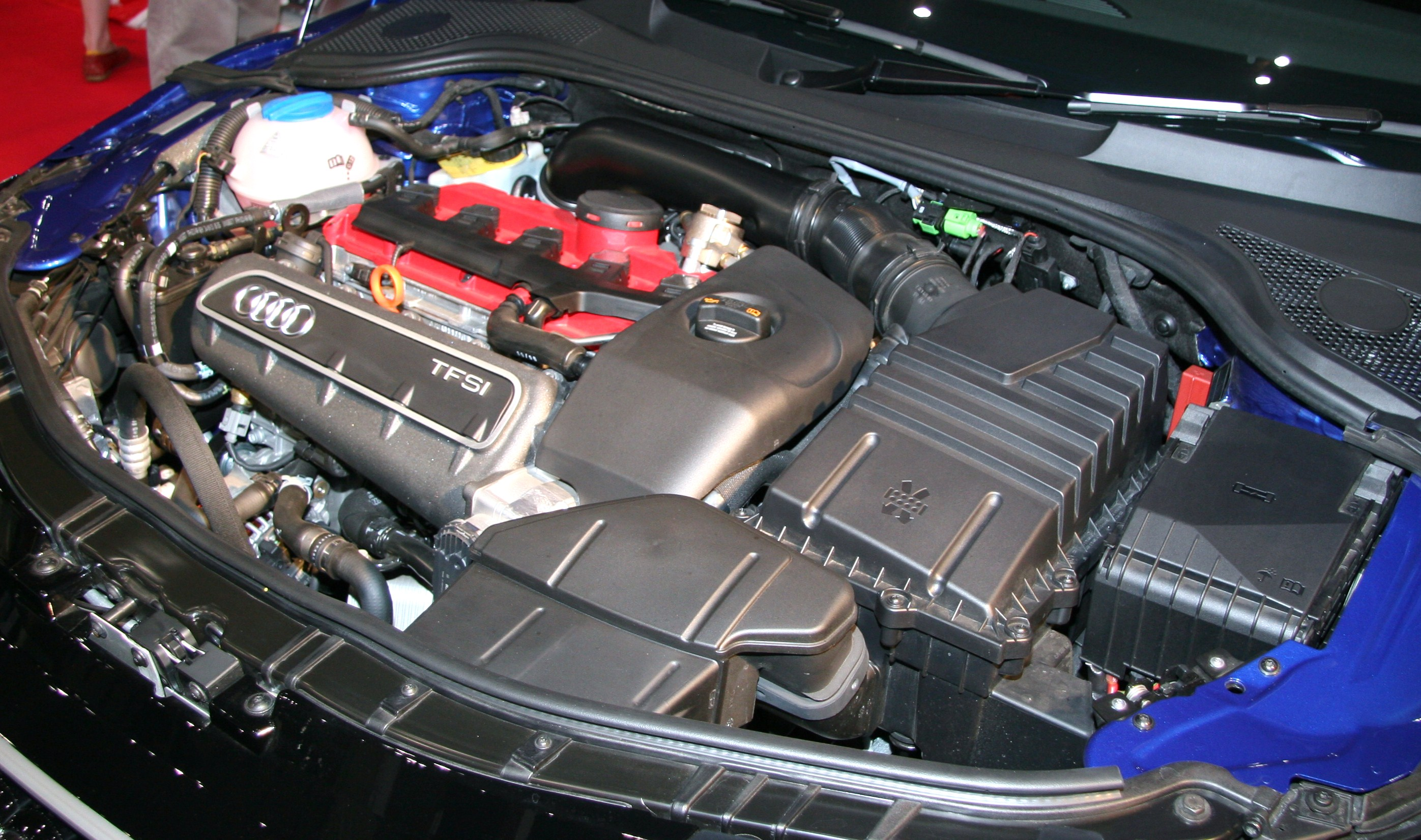
The 2.5 L TFSI Inline-five engine

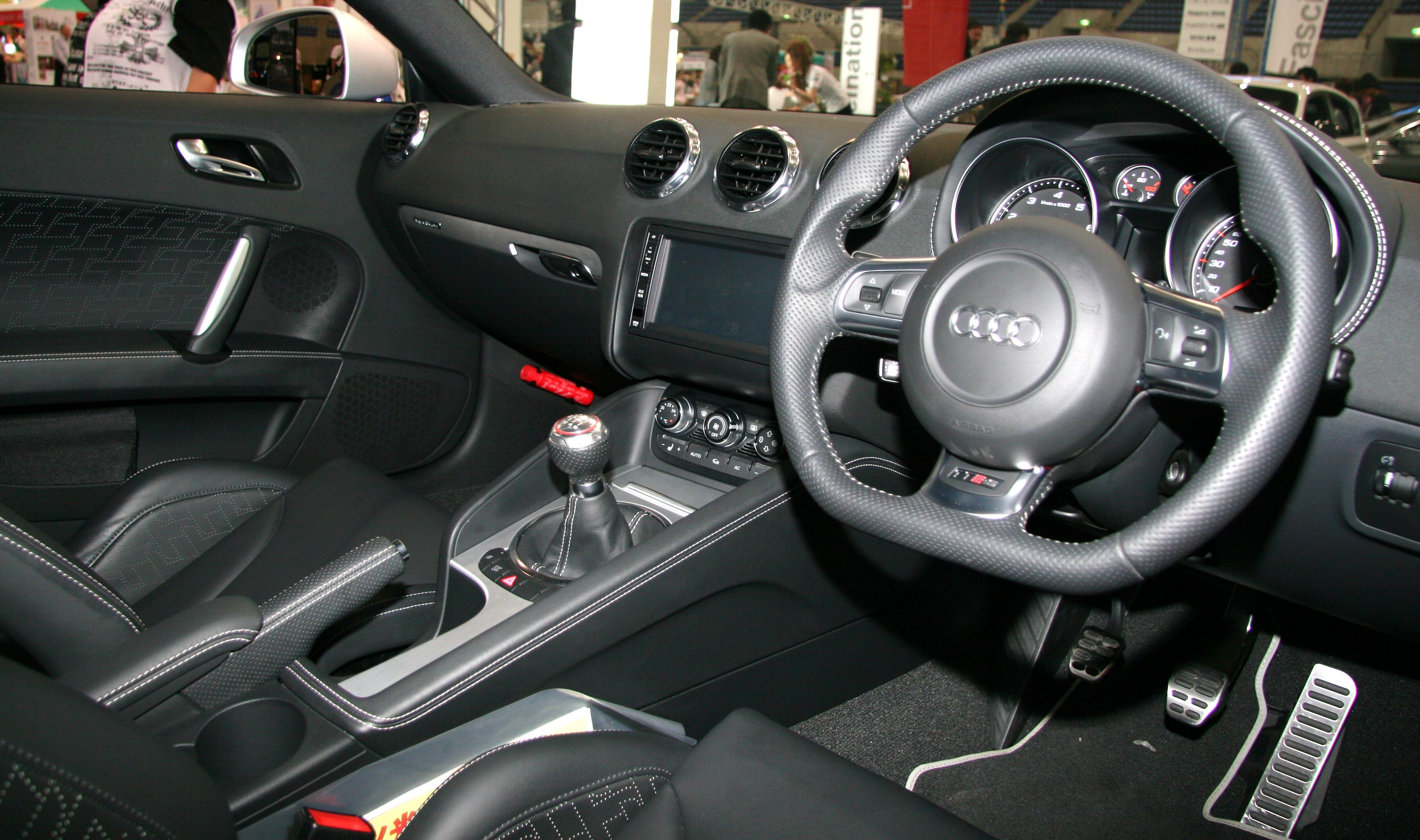
Interior (Coupé)

With its world debut at the 2009 Geneva Auto Show, and developed by Audi's high-performance subsidiary quattro GmbH at Neckarsulm, Germany, Audi released the first compact sports car Audi "RS" variant – the Audi TT RS, which was available from 2009 in Coupé and Roadster variants. The TT RS featured a new 2.5-litre Inline-5 turbocharged petrol engine. This 183 kg (403 lb) engine produces a DIN-rated power output of 250 kW (340 PS; 335 bhp) from 5,400 to 6,700 rpm, and torque of 450 N⋅m (332 lbf⋅ft) at 1,600–5,300 rpm.

Ever since the original Audi "RS" model – the Audi RS2 Avant – all Audi "RS" models were assembled at the quattro GmbH factory in Neckarsulm. The TT RS is the first Audi RS vehicle that didn't have any of its assembly performed in Neckarsulm but was completely assembled in the Audi factory in Győr, Hungary, alongside the base Audi TT.

The TT RS has a new short-shift close-ratio six-speed manual transmission, and like all "RS" models, is only available with four-wheel-drive, with the TT RS using a specially adapted version of the latest generation multi-plate clutch from Haldex Traction. Additions to the quattro system include a constant velocity joint before the cardan propeller shaft, and a compact rear-axle differential – upgraded to cope with the increased torque from the five-cylinder turbo engine.

Like the TTS, the TT RS has a 10 millimetres (0.4 in) lower ride height, optional "Audi Magnetic Ride", and rides on standard 18-inch wheels with 245/45 ZR18 tyres (optional 19" or 20" wheels are also available). The brakes are upgraded to include two-piece cross-drilled and radially vented front discs, sized at 370 mm (14.6 in) in diameter. The front discs are clamped by gloss black painted four-piston calipers, adorned with the RS logo. Rear ventilated discs are sized at 310 mm (12.2 in) in diameter.

It includes a fixed rear spoiler (retractable optional), and has black interior with heated Alcantara/leather sports seats (Silk Nappa, Fine Nappa leather optional). The Recaro "RS bucket" seats, first seen in the Audi B7 RS4 are also available as an option. Also carried over from the B7 RS4 is the "Sport" button, which sharpens the throttle response and deepens the exhaust note, and a three-stage user-selectable Electronic Stability Programme (ESP).

Official performance figures indicate the TT RS Coupé will accelerate from a standstill to 100 km/h (62.1 mph) in 4.5 seconds (4.7 seconds for the Roadster), with an electronically limited top speed of 250 km/h (155 mph). There is a factory option to de-restrict the top speed to 280 km/h (174.0 mph). The Coupé has a kerb weight of 1,450 kg (3,197 lb), and the Roadster weighs in at 1,510 kg (3,329 lb).

As of 2010, the TT-RS is available with the 7-speed DSG automatic transmission capable of handling the torque delivered by the engine. The 6-speed gearbox used in the TT-S cannot cope with 450 N⋅m (332 lb⋅ft) of torque, which is why the TT-RS initially was offered only with a manual transmission.

The car went on sale in March 2009, with delivery beginning in summer.

In 2010, the TT-RS was confirmed for the US market. The decision was influenced by an internet petition to bring the TT-RS stateside, which succeeded with over 11,000 signatures. The TT-RS arrived in Q3 2011 as a 2012 model.

In 2012, the TT RS plus was launched. It featured the uprated version of the TT RS' engine that had originally been developed for the RS Q3 concept car; this version of the engine produces 355 hp (265 kW; 360 PS) at 5500 rpm, and 343 lb⋅ft (465 N⋅m) of torque at 1650 rpm. As a result of this power increase, Audi claimed that the 0-62 mph (100 km/h) time had decreased to 4.3 seconds for the manual version, and 4.1 seconds for the S-tronic version. In addition to this, Audi raised the top speed limiter, with the TT RS plus being restricted to 174 mph (280 km/h).

=== 8J engines ===
The 8J powertrain options consist of the following engines and drivelines:

model	engine displacement	engine configuration, (ID codes) aspiration, fuel system	Max rated power at rpm (Directive 80/1269/EEC)	max. torque at rpm	years	drivetrain
Petrol engines
1.8 TFSI	1,798 cc (109.7 cu in)	Inline-4 16v DOHC (EA888); Turbocharger, Fuel Stratified Injection	118 kW (160 PS; 158 bhp) at 4,500–6,200	250 N⋅m (184 lbf⋅ft) at 1,500–4,500	2007–	FWD
2.0 TFSI	1,984 cc (121.1 cu in)	Inline-4 16v DOHC (AXX, BWA, BPY); Turbocharger, Fuel Stratified Injection	147 kW (200 PS; 197 bhp) at 5,100–6,000	280 N⋅m (207 lbf⋅ft) at 1,800–5,000	2006–2010	FWD, quattro 4WD
2.0 TFSI	1,984 cc (121.1 cu in)	Inline-4 16v DOHC; Turbocharger, Fuel Stratified Injection	155 kW (211 PS; 208 bhp) at 5,300–6,000	280 N⋅m (207 lbf⋅ft) at 1,700–5,000	2008–	FWD, quattro 4WD
2.0 TFSI	1,984 cc (121.1 cu in)	Inline-4 16v DOHC (EA888); Turbocharger, Fuel Stratified Injection	155 kW (211 PS; 208 bhp) at 4,300–6,000	350 N⋅m (258 lbf⋅ft) at 1,600–4,200	2010–	FWD, quattro 4WD
3.2 V6 quattro	3,189 cc (194.6 cu in)	VR6 24v DOHC (BUB) multi-point sequential indirect fuel injection	184 kW (250 PS; 247 bhp) at 6,300	320 N⋅m (236 lbf⋅ft) at 2,500–3,000	2006–2010	quattro 4WD
2.0 TFSI (TTS quattro)	1,984 cc (121.1 cu in)	Inline-4 16v DOHC (EA113: CDL); Turbocharger, Fuel Stratified Injection	200 kW (272 PS; 268 bhp) at 6,000	350 N⋅m (258 lbf⋅ft) at 2,500–5,000	2008–	quattro 4WD
2.5 R5 TFSI (TT RS)	2,480 cc (151.3 cu in)	Inline-5 20v DOHC (CEPA); Turbocharger, Fuel Stratified Injection	250 kW (340 PS; 335 bhp) at 5,400–6,500	450 N⋅m (332 lbf⋅ft) at 1,600–5,300	2009–	quattro 4WD
2.5 R5 TFSI (TT RS plus)	2,480 cc (151.3 cu in)	Inline-5 20v DOHC (CEPB); Turbocharger, Fuel Stratified Injection	265 kW (360 PS; 355 bhp) at 5,400–6,500	465 N⋅m (343 lbf⋅ft) at 1,600–5,300	2012–	quattro 4WD
Diesel engines
2.0 TDI quattro	1,968 cc (120.1 cu in)	Inline-4 16v DOHC; Turbocharged Direct Injection (TDI) CR	125 kW (170 PS; 168 bhp) at 4,200	350 N⋅m (258 lbf⋅ft) at 1,750–2,500	2008–	quattro 4WD

Audi was reported to stop offering 3.2-litre V6 (VR6) models in North America from 2010 model year.

=== 8J awards ===
The second generation TT has been honoured with many awards, including the inaugural Drive Car of the Year, Top Gear Coupé of the Year 2006, Fifth Gear Car of the Year 2006, Autobild Most Beautiful Car, and World Design Car of the Year 2007, as well as being a finalist for World Car of the Year. In addition, an HPA-prepared version of the car was the winner of the SEMA Gran Turismo Award in 2007. The Audi TT has been the What Car? "best Coupe of the Year" for six consecutive years since 2007.

A 2019 iSeeCars study named the TT as the longest-lasting sports car most likely to exceed 150,000 miles.

=== Safety ===
ANCAP test results* Audi TT 2.0L petrol front-wheel-drive variants (2015)
Test	Score
Overall	4 /5 stars
Frontal offset	
Side impact	
Pole	
Seat belt reminders	
Whiplash protection	
Pedestrian protection	
Electronic stability control	

== TT Mk3 (Type FV/8S, 2014–2023) ==
Third generation (FV/8S)
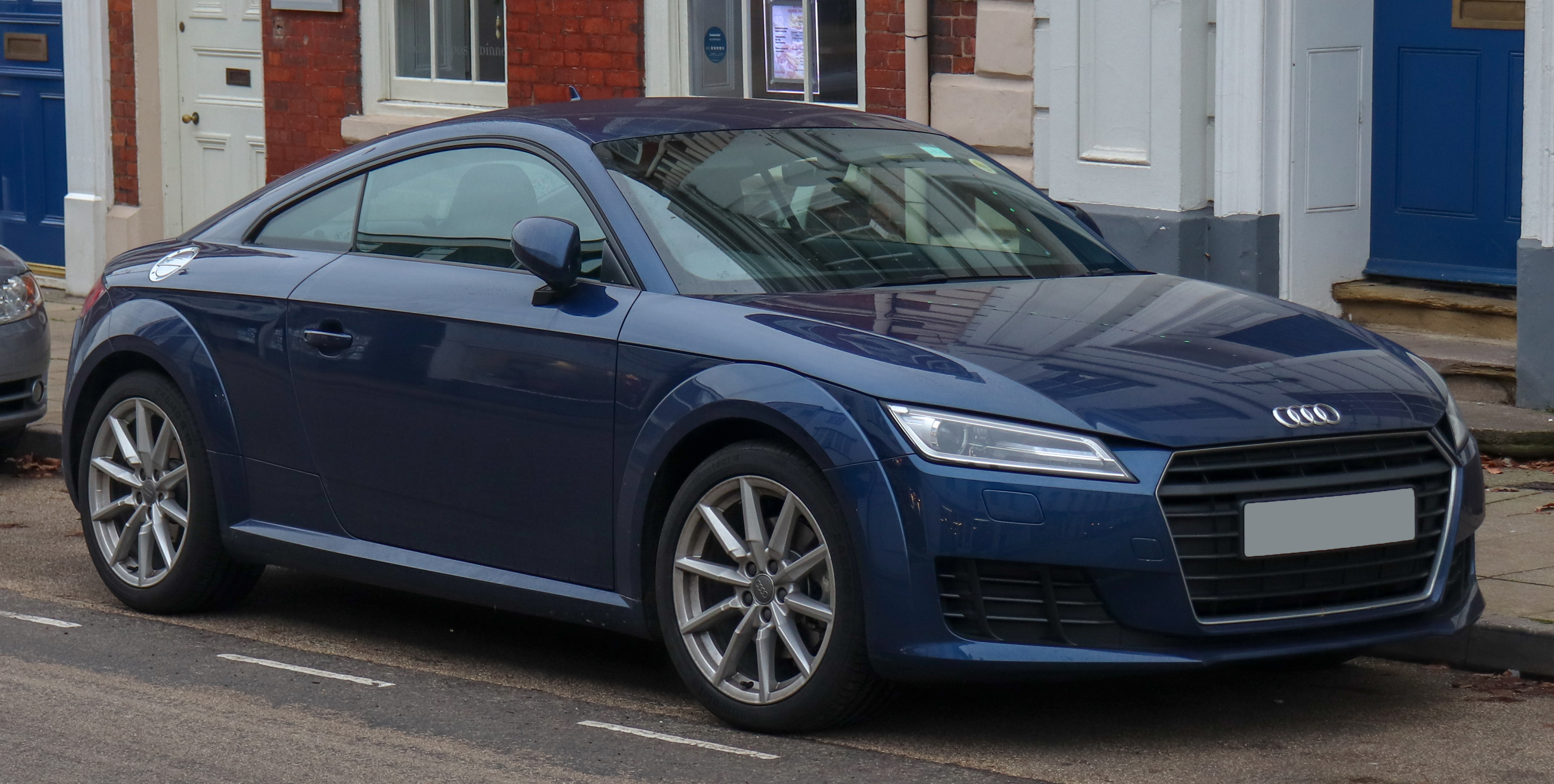

Overview
- Production: Coupé: August 2014 – November 2023; Roadster: November 2014 – November 2023
- Designer: Dany Garand, Jürgen Löffler

Body and chassis
- Platform: Volkswagen Group MQB
- Related: Audi A3 (Third Generation); SEAT León (Third Generation); Volkswagen Golf (Seventh Generation); Škoda Octavia (Third Generation)

Powertrain
- Engine: 1.8 L CJSA (EA888-Gen3) turbocharged FSI I4; 2.0 L EA888 turbocharged FSI I4; 2.0 L CUPA (EA288) TDI I4; 2.5 L LEV3-ULEV125 turbocharged FSI I5 (TT RS)
- Transmission: 6-speed manual; 6-speed S tronic; 7-speed S tronic (Facelift)

Dimensions
- Wheelbase: 2,505 mm (98.6 in)
- Length: Coupe:4,191 mm (165.0 in); Roadster: 4,177 mm (164.4 in)
- Width: 1,832 mm (72.1 in)
- Height: Coupe:1,343 mm (52.9 in); Roadster: 1,355 mm (53.3 in)
- Kerb weight: 1,230–1,425 kg (2,712–3,142 lb)

Like its predecessor, the Audi TT FV/8S was previewed in the form of the Audi Allroad Shooting Brake concept car, shown at the Detroit Motor Show in 2014.

The third generation of the TT was unveiled at the 2014 Geneva Motor Show. The FV/8S generation utilises the Volkswagen Group MQB platform, and is available with a choice of TFSI and TDI engines. The 2.0 TFSI is available in two versions: a version producing 169 kW (230 PS; 227 hp) and 370 N⋅m (272.90 lb⋅ft) of torque in the TT and a version producing 228 kW (310 PS; 306 hp) and 380 N⋅m (280.27 lb⋅ft) of torque in the TTS. A 2.0 TDI Inline-four engine producing 135 kW (184 PS; 181 hp) and 380 N⋅m (280.27 lb⋅ft) of torque is also available as an option for the TT. The TFSI engines are available with all wheel drive. The TDI comes in front wheel drive configuration, but was then later released with the Audi's quattro all wheel drive.

In 2019, the models were updated with the following specifications:

- TT 40: with a 2.0L engine producing 145 kW (197 PS; 194 hp) and 320 N⋅m (236.02 lb⋅ft) of torque
- TT 45: with a 2.0L engine producing 180 kW (245 PS; 241 hp) and 370 N⋅m (272.90 lb⋅ft) of torque
- TTS (from 2019 until 2021): with a 2.0L engine producing 225 kW (306 PS; 302 hp) and 400 N⋅m (295.02 lb⋅ft) of torque
- TTS (from 2021 until 2023): with a 2.0L engine producing 235 kW (320 PS; 315 hp) and 400 N⋅m (295.02 lb⋅ft) of torque
- TT RS: with a 2.5L engine producing 294 kW (400 PS; 394 hp) and 480 N⋅m (354.03 lb⋅ft) of torque

The third generation Audi TT features temperature and airflow controls embedded in the air-vents.

In the US, this generation was available from Model Year 2016 onward. It was announced in May 2019 that the current generation TT would be the last, and it would be discontinued at the end of the model's lifecycle.

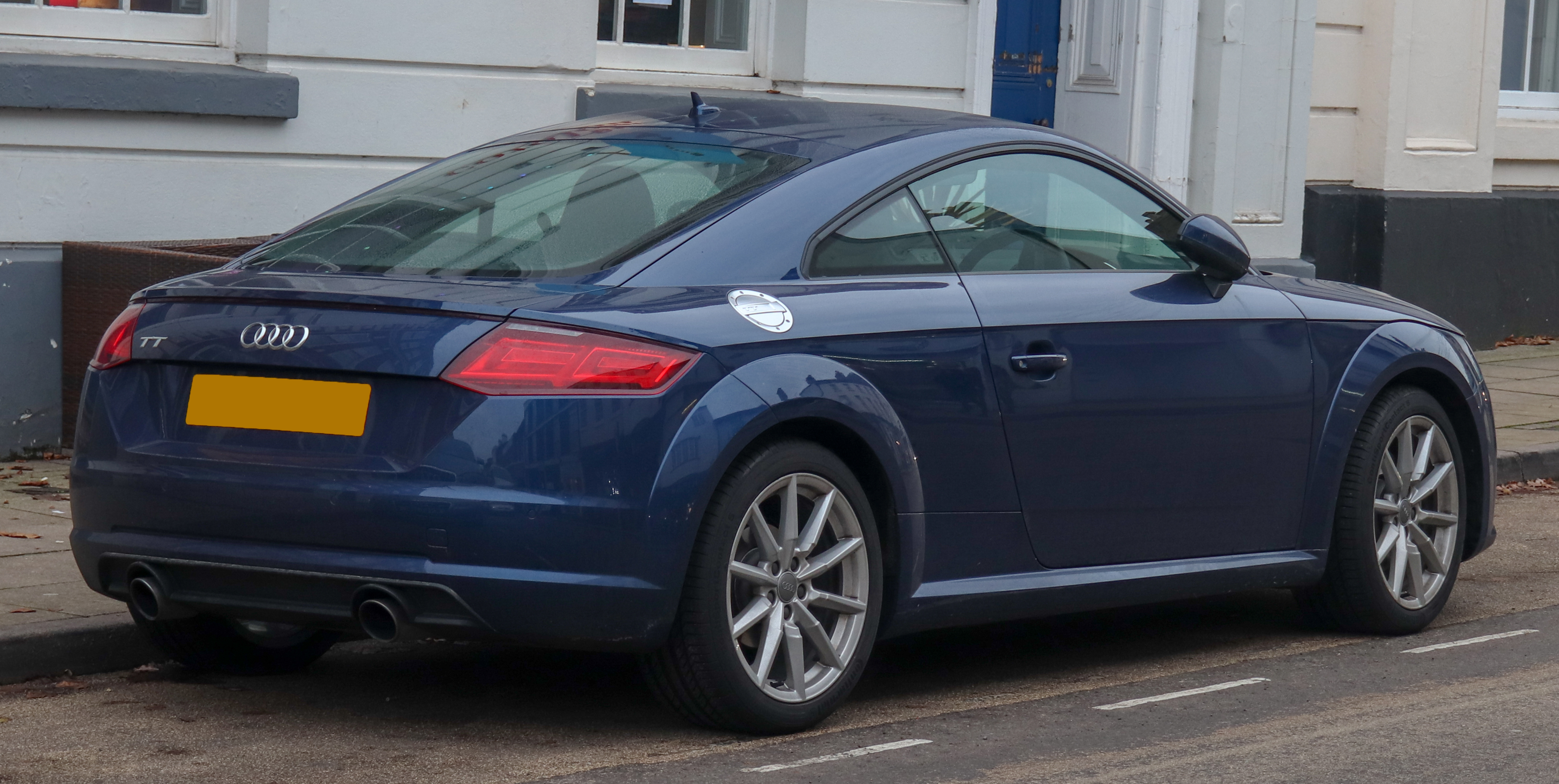
Audi TT Coupé (Pre-facelift)

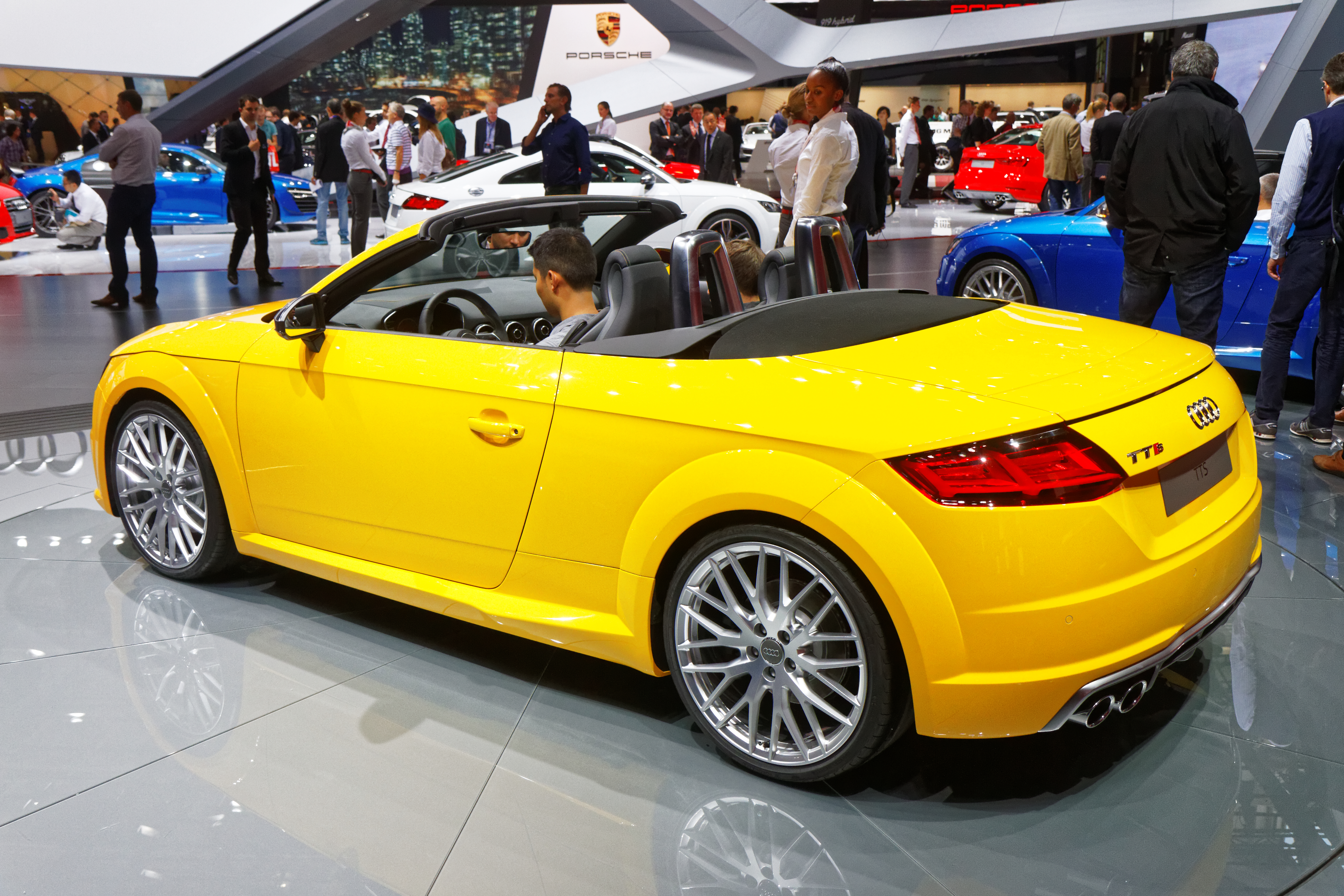
Audi TTS Roadster (Pre-Facelift)

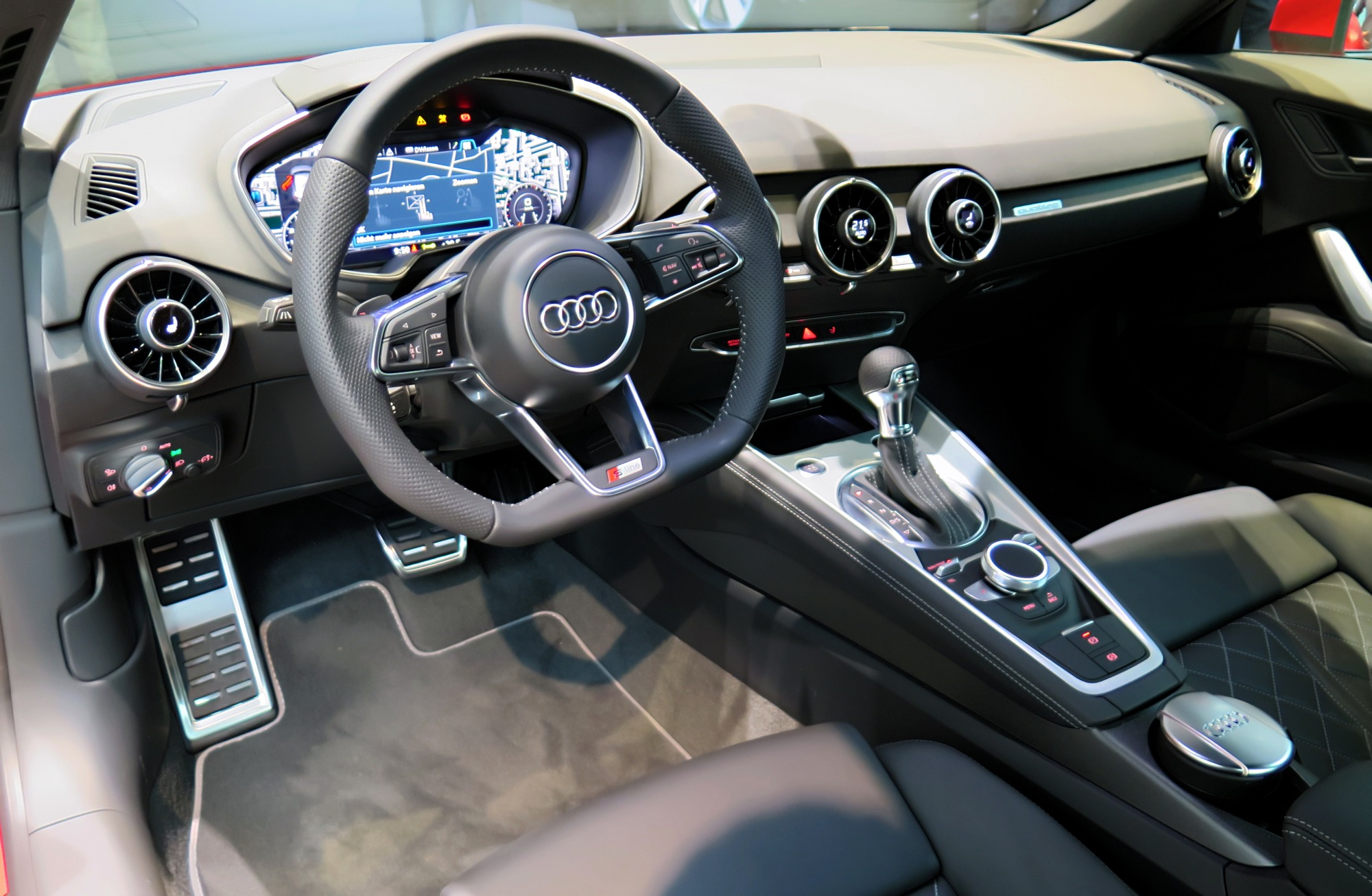
Interior

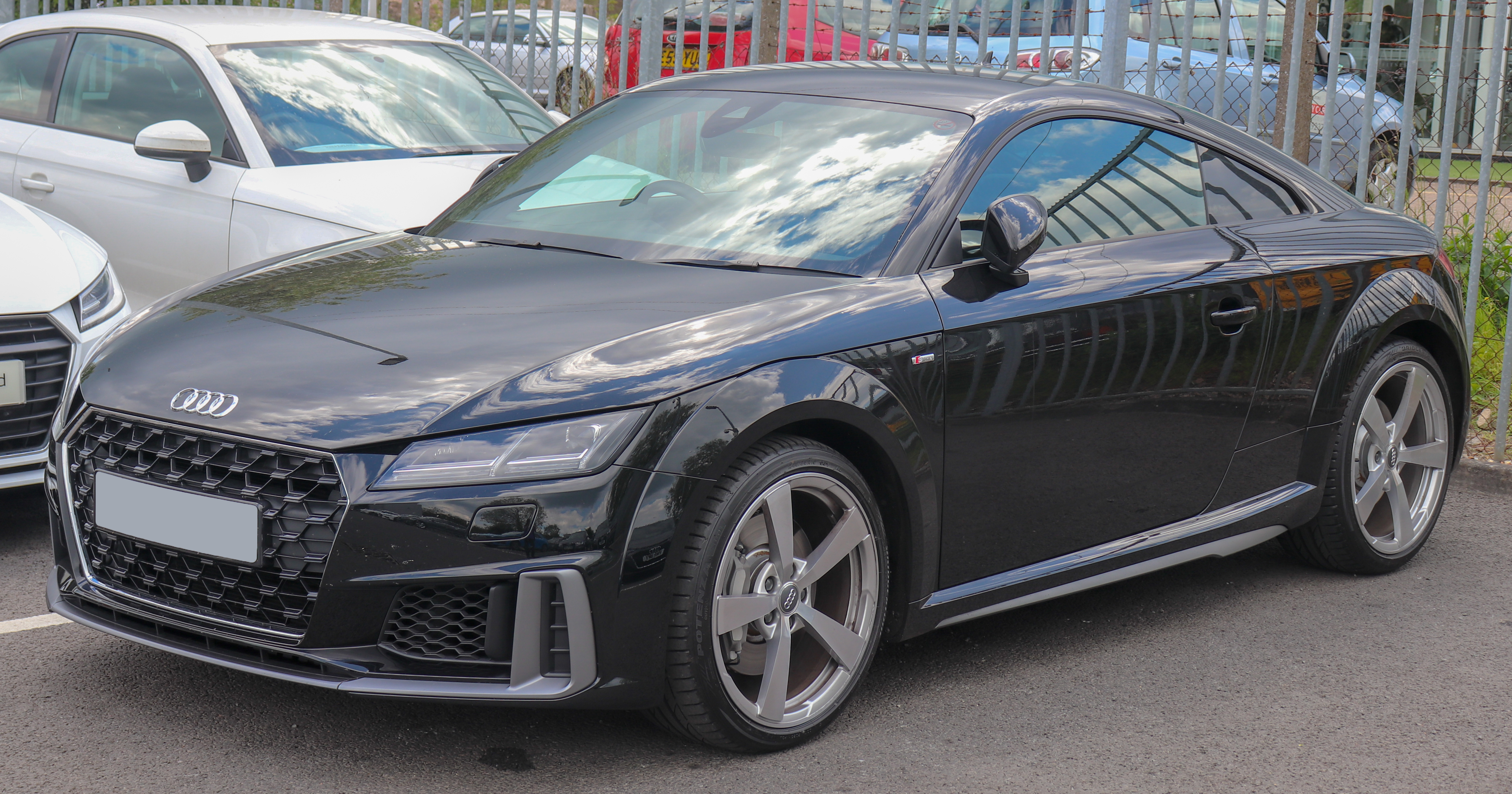
Audi TT S-Line (Facelift)

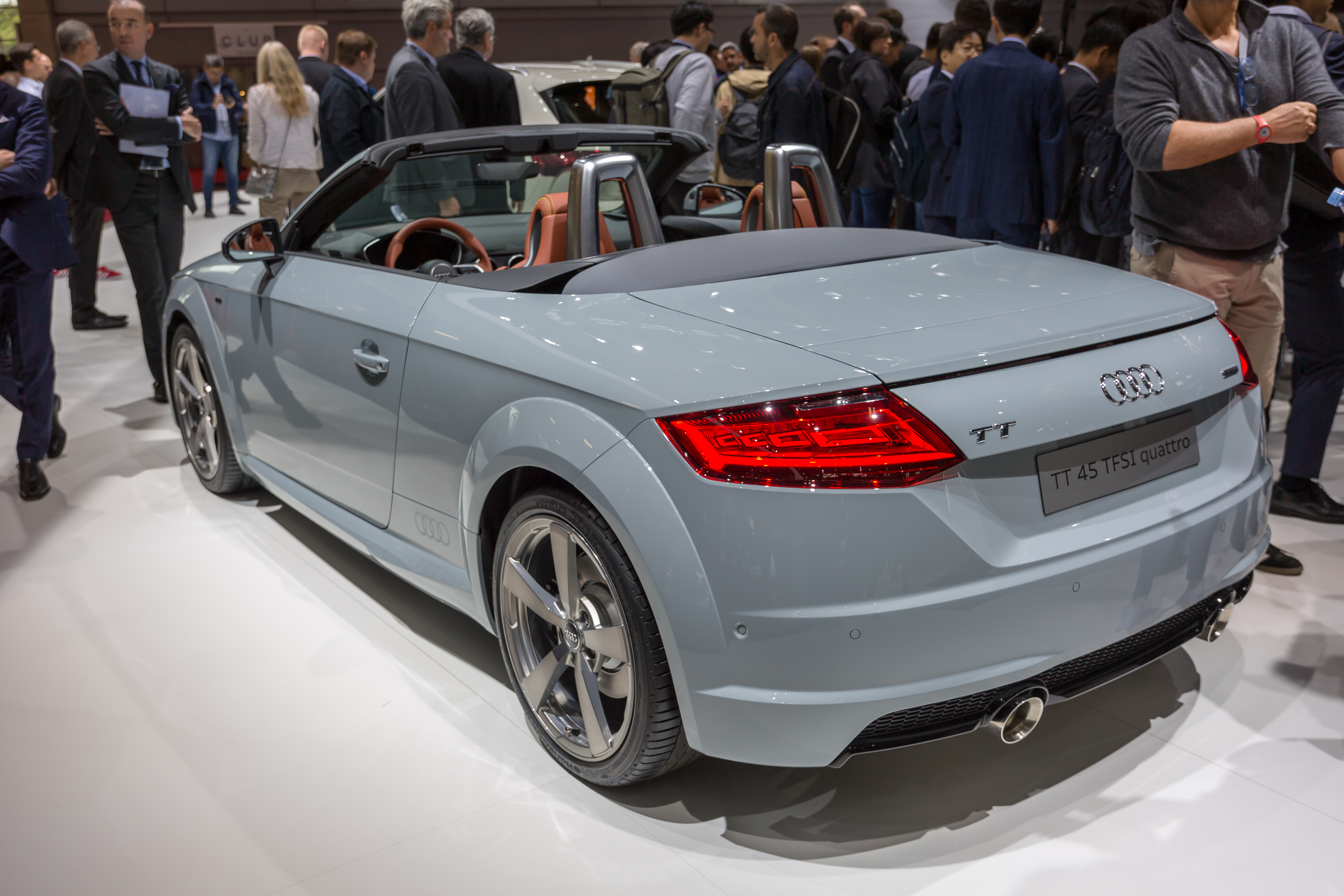
Audi TT 20 Years Edition Roadster (Facelift)

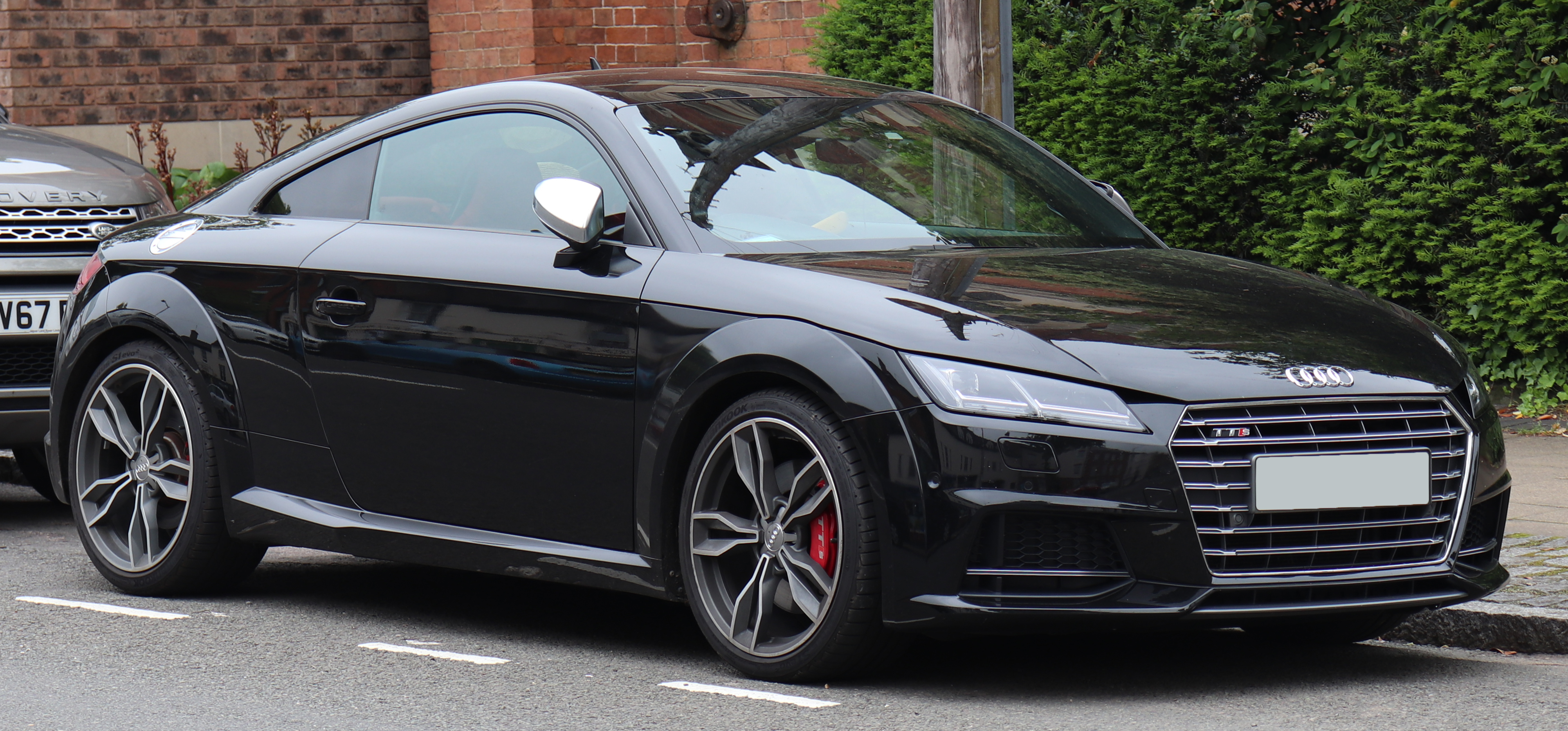
Audi TTS (Pre-facelift)

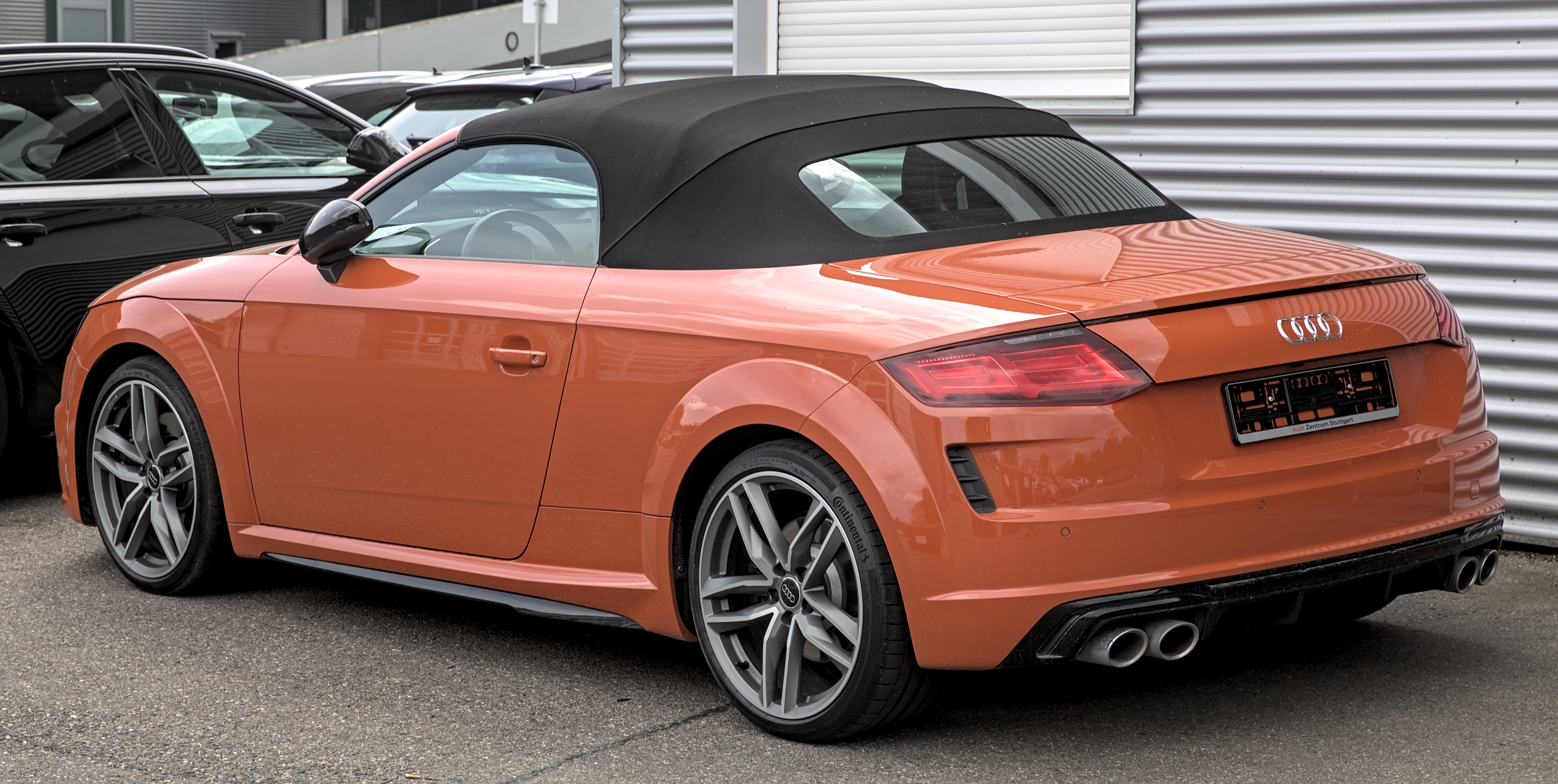
Audi TTS Roadster (Facelift)

=== TT RS ===
In 2016, the MQB-based Audi TT RS coupé and roadster were announced with the five-cylinder 2.5 litre TFSI engine now producing 294 kW (400 PS; 394 hp) and 480 N⋅m (354 lb⋅ft) of torque between 1,700 and 5,850 rpm. It was only offered in Audi's all-wheel drive quattro system and the 7-speed S-tronic automatic transmission.

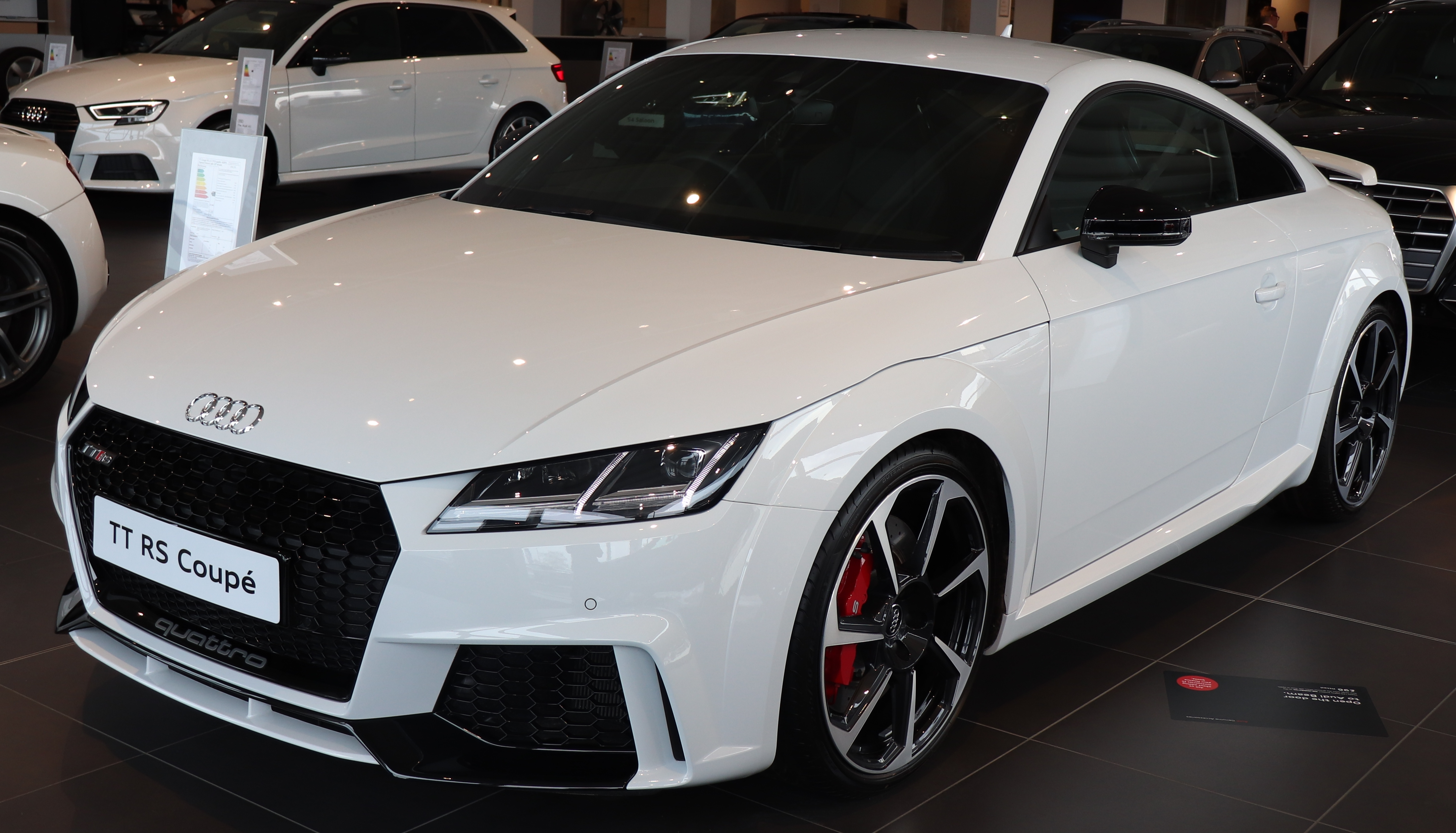
Audi TT RS (Pre-facelift)

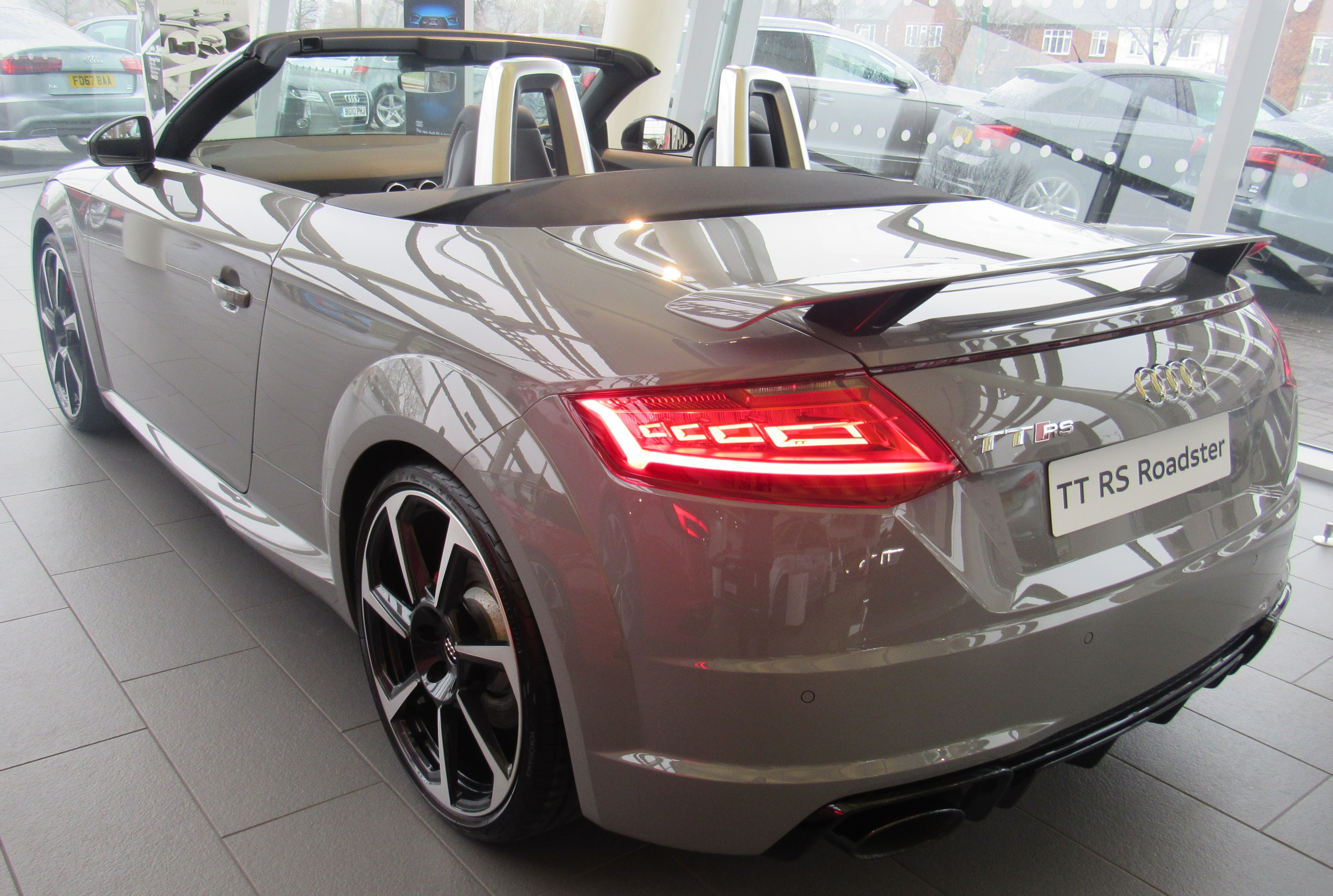
Audi TT RS Roadster (Pre-facelift)

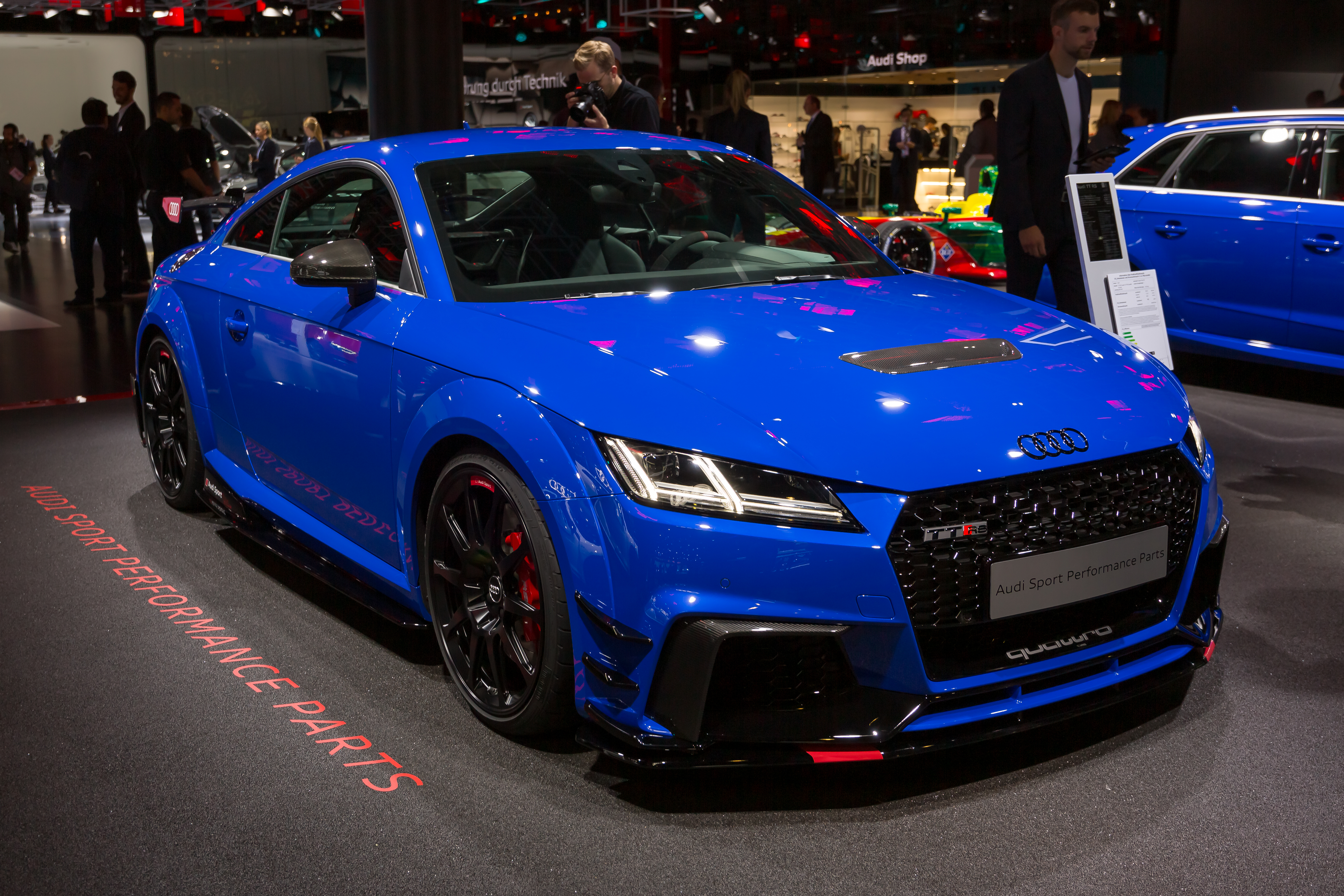
Audi TT RS with Audi Sport Performance Parts

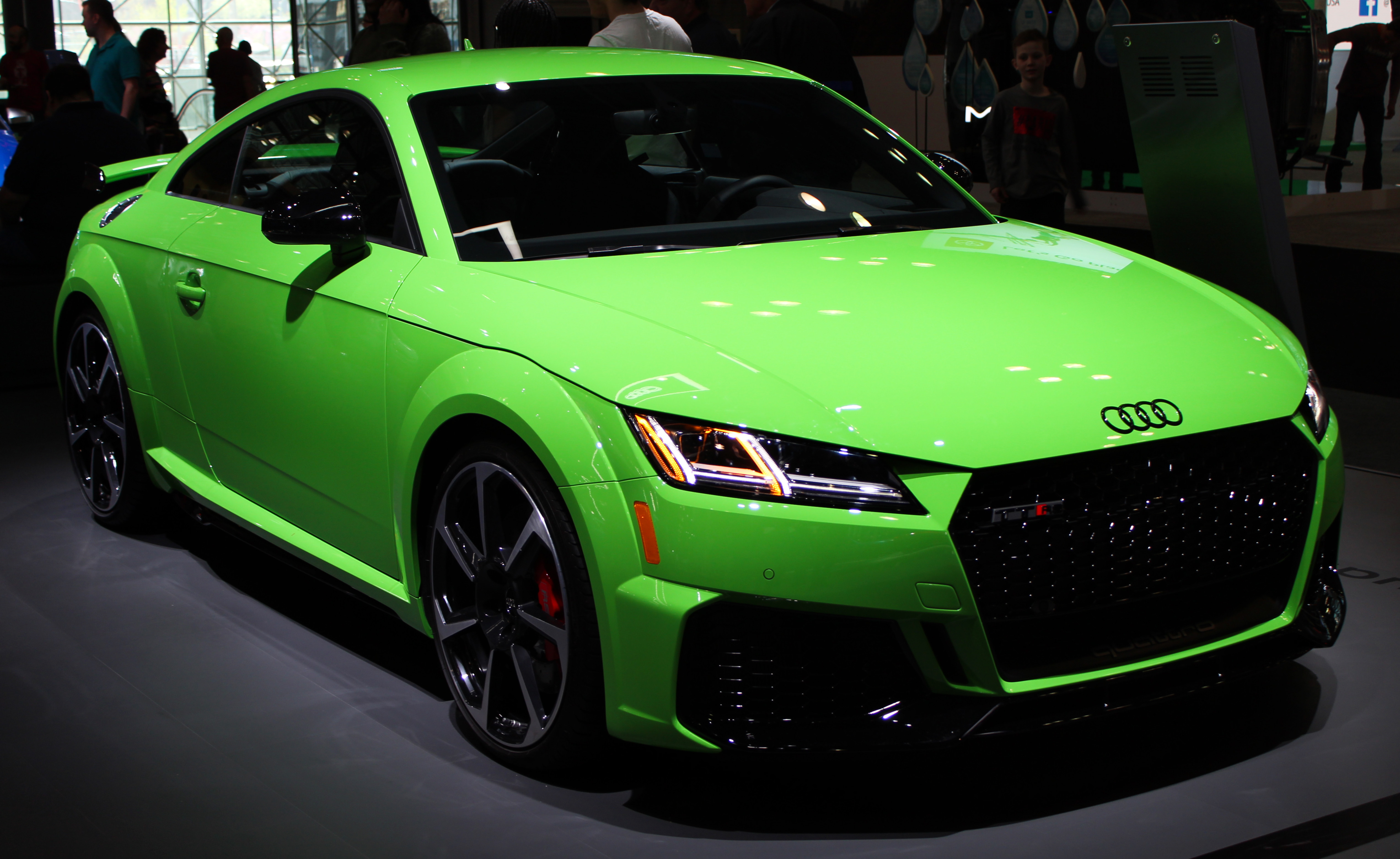
Audi TT RS (Facelift)

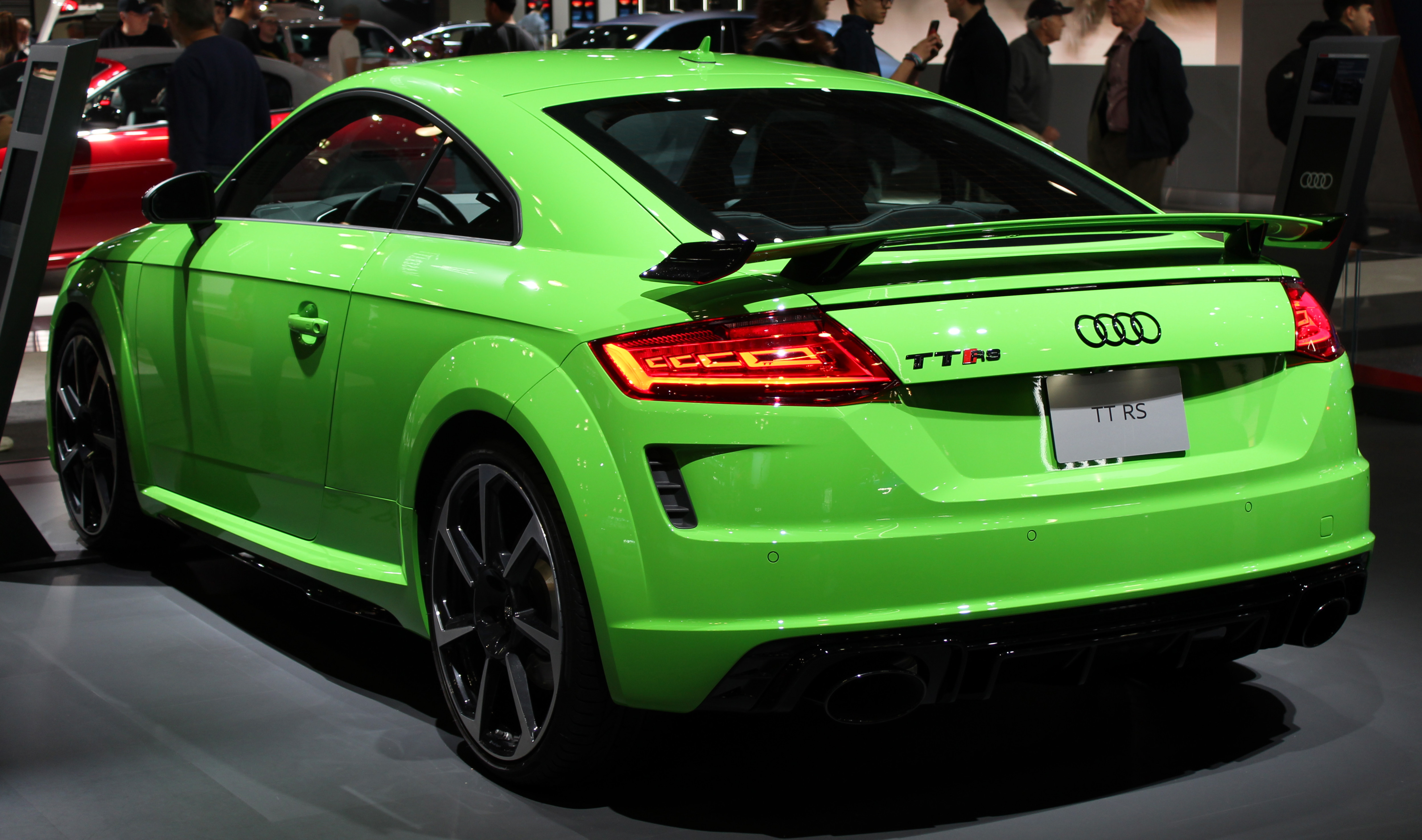
Audi TT RS (Facelift)

=== Special editions ===
==== TT RS Heritage Edition ====
Audi discontinued the TT RS in the United States after the 2022 model year, so they released the TT RS Heritage Edition, a special edition available in five colors and produced in just 50 units. Ten of each color will be made, each color representing a Ur-Quattro rally champion:

- Alpine white with ocean blue leather and diamond silver stitch
- Helios blue metallic diamond silver leather and ocean blue stitch
- Stone gray metallic with crimson red leather and jet gray stitch
- Tizian red metallic with Havanna brown leather and jet gray stitch
- Malachite green metallic with cognac brown leather and black stitch

==== TT RS Audi Sport Performance Parts Edition ====
Audi Sport Performance Parts were available from 2018 to 2020 from Audi Dealerships in Europe. These parts were designed to improve dynamic handling for the Audi R8 and the Audi TT models. The retrofit range were available as add-on features for new car buyers who ordered their cars as a new car customer build. Only 15 fully built example cars were made complete with all the features from the Audi Sport Factory which were distributed around the world for the purpose of International car shows. The 15 Factory built TT RS Audi Sport Performance parts edition cars had their own build type and known as ultra rare around the world. 13 are known to be in Europe (LHD) and 2 in Australia (RHD).

==== TT RS Iconic Edition ====
In October 2022, Audi launched the TT RS Coupé Iconic Edition. Compared to the regular TT RS, the Iconic Edition came in Nardo Gray, Audi Sport Performance Parts, two tone RS sport seats with Jet Gray Nappa side panels with Calendula Yellow honeycomb stitching and 20 inch Rotor wheels finished in black. Production was limited to 100 units, and were sold exclusively in Europe, 11 of which were left-hand-drive.

TT 20th Anniversary Edition

In January 2019, Audi revealed the 20th Anniversary Edition to celebrate 20 years of the TT lineup. Serving as a homage to the original 8N generation, it was offered as a coupe or roadster and came in Aviator Gray pearl or Nimbus Gray metallic (latter exclusive to the US), “20 Years of TT” badging, 19 inch 5-arm-design wheels in gunmetal, and yellow contrast baseball stitching along with a Moccasin Brown Nappa leather interior. Production was limited to 999 units, and were sold in U.S. and European markets.

==== TT/TTS Final Edition ====
In 2023, Audi unveiled the Final Edition of the TT, coinciding with the discontinuation of the TT due to declining sales of the two-door coupé segment. The Final Edition TTs feature black exterior accents consisting of the tailpipes, badges and rings, door mirrors, and fixed spoiler. The roadster is equipped with black roll bars and a black wind diffuser, while the coupé receives privacy glass. The TT Final Edition receives 20-inch, Y-style five spoke matte grey finished wheels with red brake calipers, while the TTS Final Edition is fitted with seven spoke black alloy wheels of Audi Sport. Both body styles are available in either Chronos Grey Metallic, Glacier White, or Tango Red body colors.

On the interior, the Final Edition is equipped with the extended leather package, which adds the material to the center console trim, armrests, and door pull handles. A red stitched Alcantara steering wheel is fitted, with a 12 o'clock marker unique to the Final Edition. The air vents, armrests, and center console of the coupe are adorned with Tango Red accents. The Alcantara-trimmed seats feature red stitching, and the floor mats receive red piping as well. The Final Edition is exclusive to the United Kingdom, with Audi confirming that it will not be available in North America.

== Motorsport ==
In auto racing, the Istook's Motorsports team has currently entered a Revo Technik-sponsored Audi TT in the Grand-Am KONI Sports Car Challenge Street Tuner (ST) class.

Under the racing name of RS Werkes, Istook's Motorsports out of Fort Worth, Texas, built and raced the first TT RS brought into the United States in the Grand Am GS class in 2012, 2013 and 2014.

An Audi TT RS was used at the 2009 24 Hours of Le Mans race as the safety car.

The Abt Sportsline team entered a TT into the DTM, and Laurent Aïello took the title in 2002. Istook's Motorsports has also raced the TT in SCCA's World Challenge race series. Because of their racing involvement, they received the first U.S. Version of the TT-RS in July 2011.

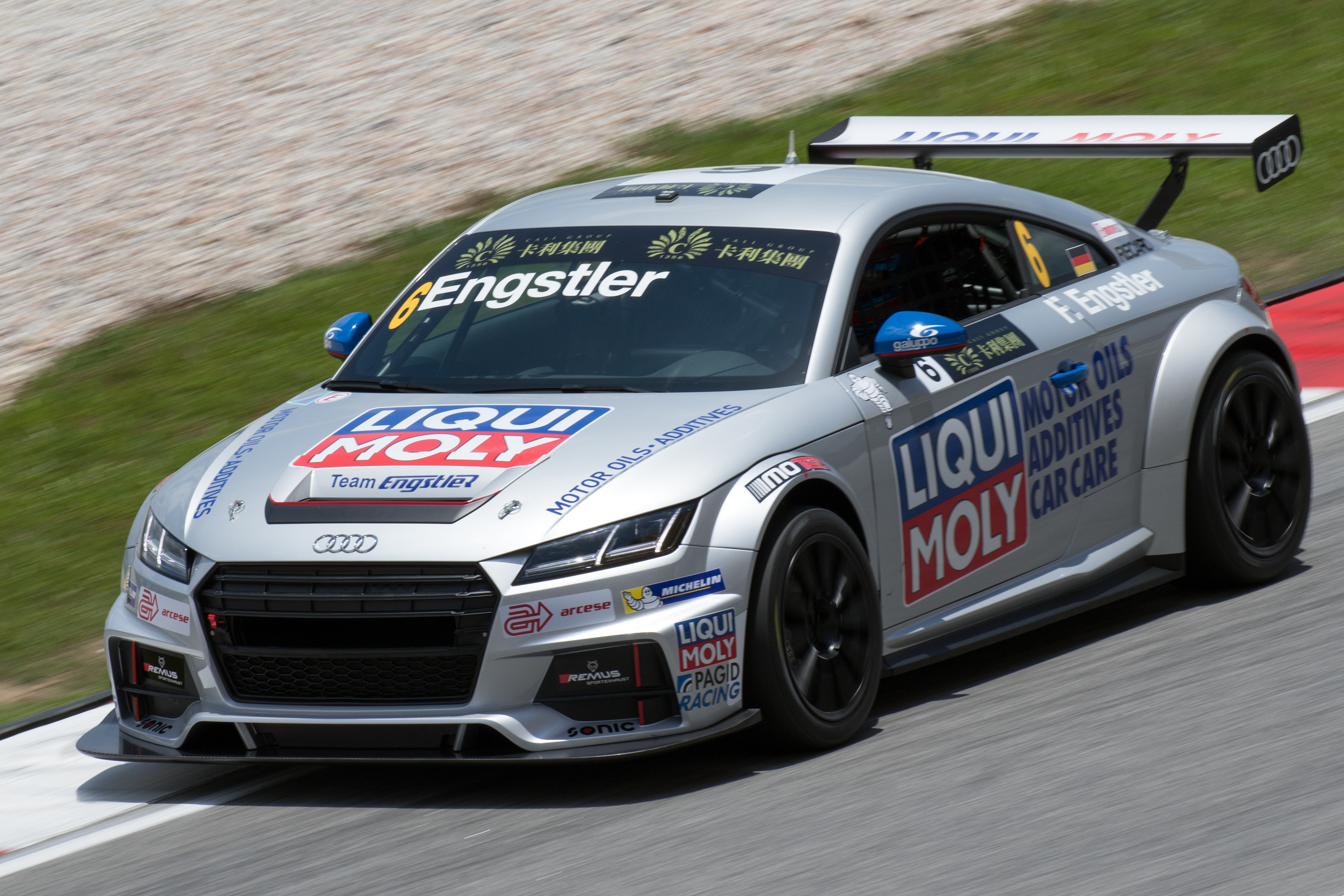
An Audi TT Cup competing in the 2015 TCR International series in 2015

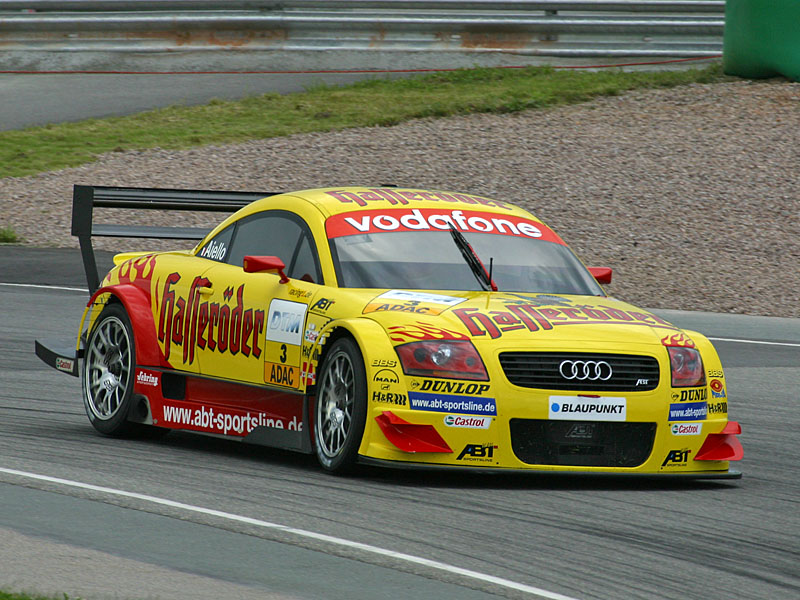
ABT Sportsline's Audi TT-R competing in DTM

== Audi TT Offroad ==
The Audi TT Offroad Concept was unveiled as an SUV concept version of the Audi TT at the 2014 Auto China. The SUV utilized a hybrid system coupled with the 2.0-litre TFSI Inline-4 engine producing a total of 304 kW (413 PS; 408 hp) and 649 N⋅m (479 lb⋅ft) of torque. The SUV utilises a 6-speed dual clutch automatic transmission. The hybrid system consists of a 40 kW (54 PS; 54 hp) electric motor on the front axle and an 85 kW (116 PS; 114 hp) electric motor on the rear axle. In full EV mode, the vehicle uses the rear motor only; Hybrid and Sport modes utilise all three power sources, and all-wheel-drive traction is applied as needed. Performance figures include a 0–62 mph (0–100 km/h) acceleration time of 5.2 seconds and an electronically limited top speed of 155 mph (249 km/h). The distinguishing features of the concept include matrix LED headlights and two new assistance systems: One that scans intersections for potentially dangerous situations, and a second that connects to a municipality's traffic-light system in order to recommend a perfect speed to reach the next light when it is green. The interior is relatively close to the TT's with leather upholstery from Italian fashion brand Poltrona Frau and features a high-tech TFT display in front of the driver populated with the information that would normally be projected onto a central, dash-mounted screen—i.e. navigation, entertainment. The trunk of the vehicle contains a 1:8 scale RC car as a souvenir.

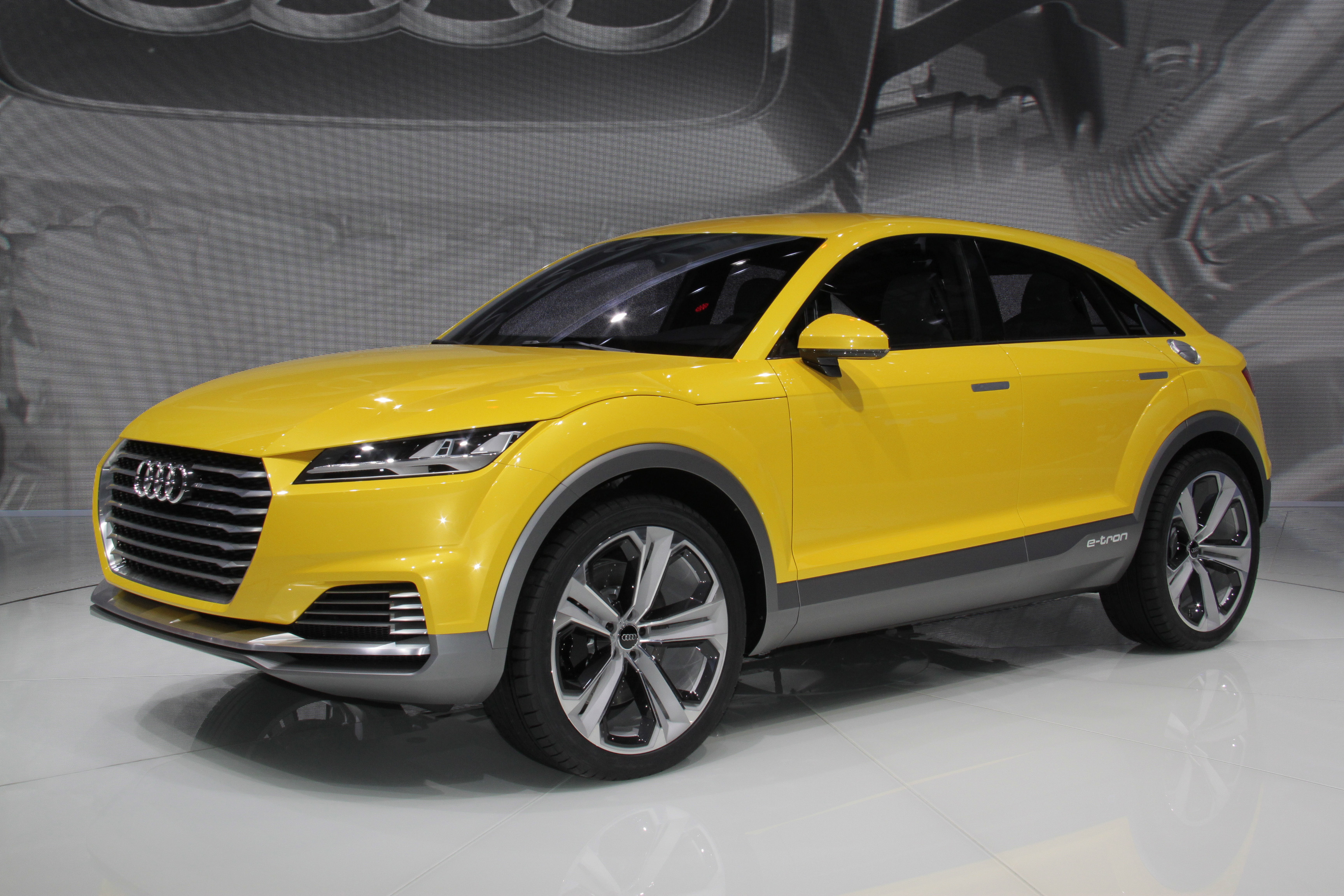
Audi TT Off-Road Concept

== Marketing ==
Due to Audi's heavy sponsorship of the Marvel Cinematic Universe, the TTS coupe made a cameo in Avengers: Age of Ultron. A convertible TTS was also owned by Flash Thompson and driven by Peter Parker in Spider-Man: Homecoming.

== Sales ==
Year	Production	
Year	Coupé	Roadster
1998	13,682	-
1999	44,022	8,557
2000	31,064	25,712
2001	22,078	17,271
2002	21,488	13,223
2003	20,807	11,530
2004	14,753	8,852
2005	8,368	3,939
2006	21,461	2,214
2007	40,417	16,349
2008	31,101	10,688
2009	18,010	4,811
2010	20,413	5,804
2011	25,508	
2012	21,880	
2013	18,358	
2014	17,621	
2015	35,510	
2016	26,886	
2017	22,174	
2018	12,118	
2019	14,999	
2020	8,646	
2021	8,489	
2022	8,126	
2023	9,530	

== Bibliography ==
- Lewandowski, Jürgen, Staretz, David, Völker, Herbert: Das TT Buch. Delius Klasing, Bielefeld 1999, ISBN 3-7688-1117-4.
- Ruppert, James: Audi TT – The complete Story. The Crowood Press, Marlborough 2003, ISBN 1-86126-585-9 (in englisch)
- Maxeiner, Dirk, Lewandowski, Jürgen, Vann, Peter: Excittement – Die neue Generation des Audi TT. Delius Klasing, Bielefeld 2006, ISBN 3-7688-1881-0.
- Kraus-Weysser, Folker: Audi TT. Steiger, Augsburg 1999, ISBN 3-89652-189-6

== See also ==
- Audi S and RS models
