= Engine swap =

Process of replacing a car's engine

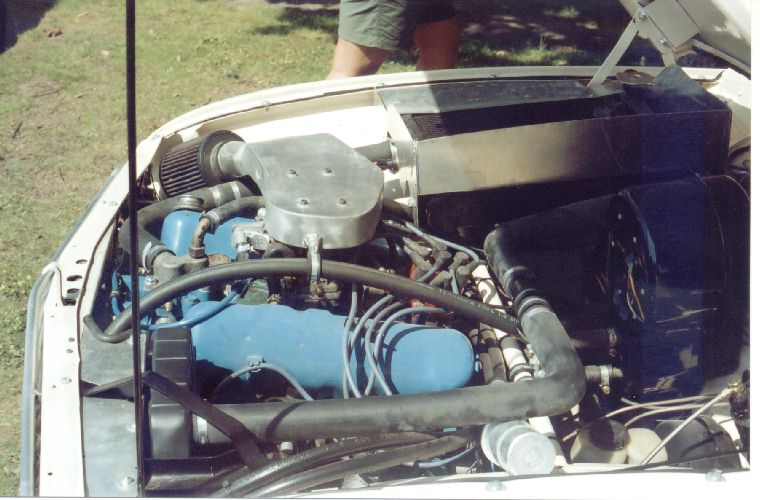
Saab 96 with a Ford Cologne V6 engine instead of the standard Ford Taunus V4 engine

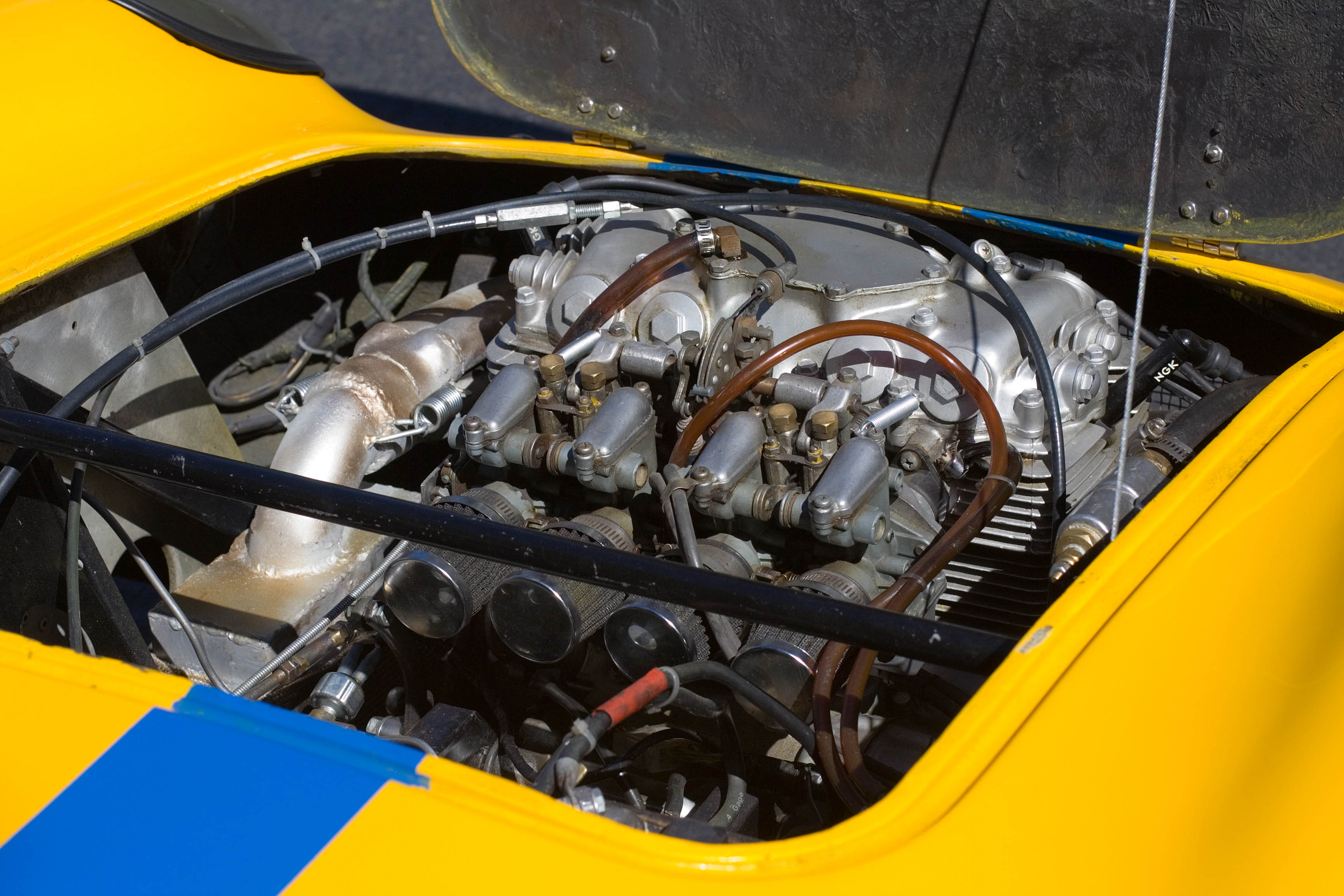
Berkeley SA492 with a Honda CB400 engine

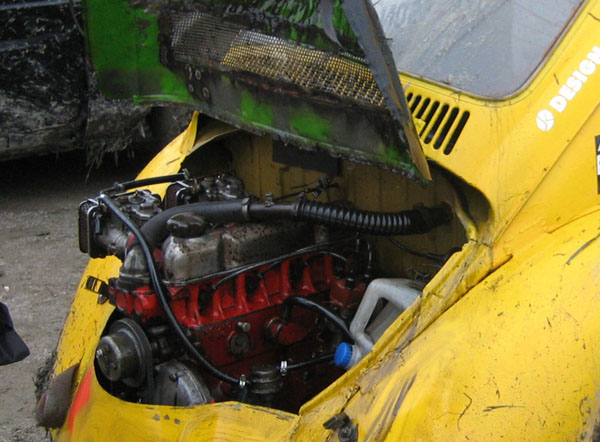
Volvo B18/B20 fitted to a VW Beetle for racing

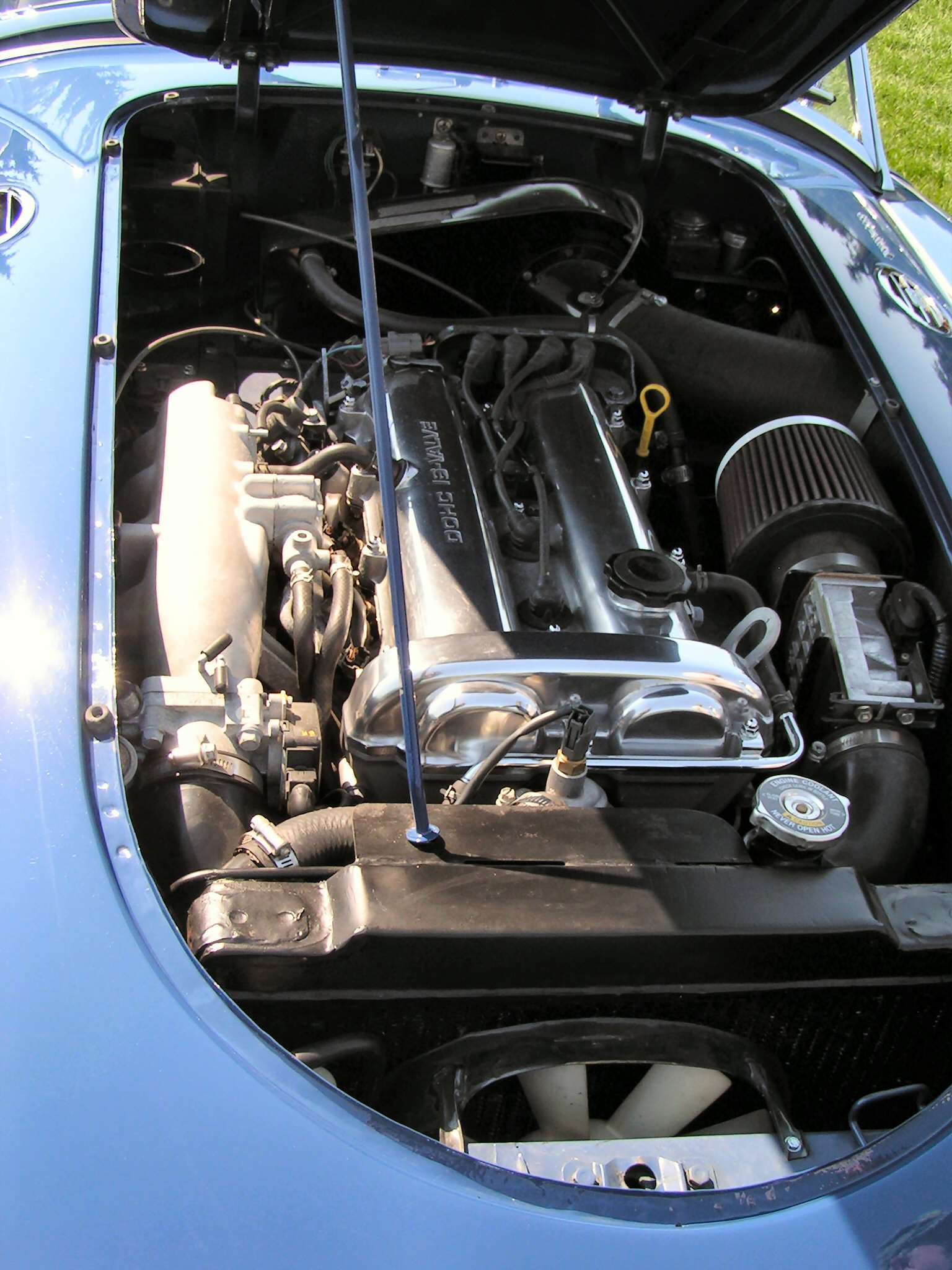
1959 MG MGA with a Mazda MX-5 engine

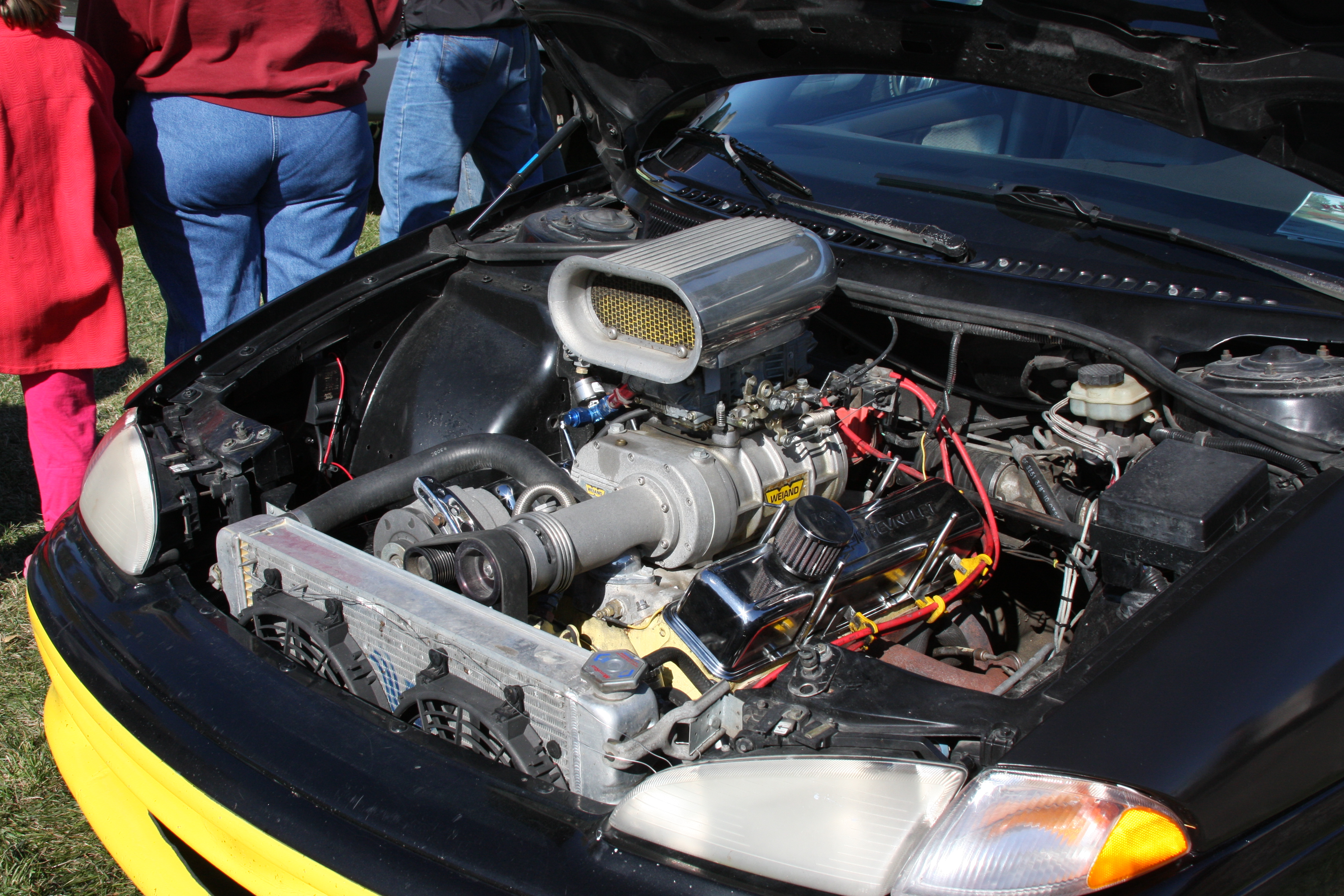
Chrysler Intrepid with supercharged V8 and rear-wheel drive conversion

In car tuning culture, an engine swap is the process of removing a car's original engine and replacing it with another. This may be a like-for-like replacement or the installation of a non-factory specification engine. Typically, an engine swap is performed for performance using a more powerful engine, but may also be performed for ease of maintenance as older engines may have a shortage of spare parts.

== Overview ==
An engine swap can either be to another engine intended to work in the car by the manufacturer, or one totally different, with the former being much simpler than the latter. Fitting an engine into a car that was never intended to accept that engine may be more laborious and costly, and may involve modifying the car to fit the engine, modifying the engine to fit the car, and building custom engine mounts and transmission bell housing adaptors to interface them, along with a custom-built driveshaft. Some small businesses build conversion kits for engine swaps, and many shops and companies perform engine swaps for customers.

Swapping the engine may have negative effects on a car's safety, performance, handling, and reliability. For example, the new engine may change the weight distribution and overall weight in a way that adversely affects vehicle dynamics. Existing brake, transmission, and suspension components may also be insufficient for the increased weight and power of the new engine, with either upgrades being required or premature wear and failure being likely. It may also be difficult to get the car's interior and exterior features, such as the headlights or gauge cluster, to work with the new engine.

Insurance companies may charge more or even refuse to insure a vehicle that has been fitted with an engine different from its initial configuration. It may also be harder to register an engine swapped vehicle or get it to pass government mandated safety inspections. For instance, in jurisdictions such as California, with its strict smog rules, it may not be possible to register a late-model vehicle with an engine swap.

== Types of swaps ==
=== American engines ===
A common anecdote among tuners in the United States is that the easiest way to make a car faster is to drop in a more powerful engine. The LS swap, which involves swapping a General Motors LS-based small-block V8 engine into a car which either didn't originally come with it, or came with a different variant of it, is considered to be one of the most popular engine swaps in the United States, being swapped into a wide variety of cars from many manufacturers. Prior to the introduction of the LS engine, it was also popular to swap both small block and big block Chevrolet V8 engines into a number of cars.

Ford V8s such as the 302 and Coyote are also popular for engine swaps. A 302 fitted with aluminium heads, intake, and water pump only adds about 40 lb (18 kg) to the front of an MG MGB and is substantially more powerful and lighter-weight than the iron-block six-cylinder found in an MG MGC or Triumph TR6. Aluminium 302 performance blocks are available that weigh 60 lb (27 kg) less than the common iron versions and can be found in displacements of 331 and 347 cu in (5.4 and 5.7 L), but they are significantly more expensive.

British sports cars (such as MGs, Triumphs, and Sunbeam Alpines) from the late 1960s and early 1970s were popular choices to engine swap with more powerful or durable engines. The original manufacturers did this when the vehicles were current with the MGB GT V8 and the Sunbeam Tiger. From an aftermarket perspective, the all-aluminum 215 cu in (3.5 L) Buick and Oldsmobile V8 engines are a traditional choice for these cars. Derivatives of that classic General Motors engine, the 3.5L, 3.9L, and 4.2L Rover V8s are also frequently used. (The original Buick/Oldsmobile, the Rover, and the related Morgan-licensed V8, are simple bolt-ins.)

Chrysler sold many turbocharged models in the 1980s, and the engines they use share much in common with their mass-produced naturally aspirated counterparts. It is quite common to swap a Dodge Daytona engine into a Dodge Aries. The Mopar Performance division even offered a kit to upgrade the Daytona to rear-wheel drive with a Mopar V8.

Although the more recent 60-degree Ford and GM V6 engines—notably GM's 3.4L L32—are more compact than Buick/Oldsmobile/Rover and Ford V8s, they usually do not equal the power-to-weight ratio of the popular 90-degree V8s frequently swapped into smaller cars. These V6s can, however, be very cost-effective and easier to fit into a variety of cars.

With the rise of electric vehicles, there has been a growth in the popularity of EV swaps, which take a vehicle originally powered by an internal combustion engine, and replace its engine and running gear with one or more electric motors and an accompanying battery pack. The electric drivetrain is often taken from a Tesla or another widely available electric vehicle. Multiple companies have been founded which offer EV conversions for classic cars.

=== Japanese engines ===
In the Honda world, common engine swaps include B-series engines as used in the sixth-generation Civic Si (B16A) and Type R (B16B) and the third-generation Integra GSR (B18C) and Type R (B18C5), as well as K-series engines. More recently, larger displacement Honda engines such as the J-series V6 have also become popular to swap.

Two of the most popularly swapped Japanese engines are the Toyota 1JZ and 2JZ inline sixes. The Toyota UZ V8 is also a relatively common swap.

The Nissan SR20DET inline-four, Nissan RB series of inline-sixes, and Mazda 13B rotary engine, are also commonly swapped engines into a variety of platforms.

In addition to Volkswagen air-cooled engines, vintage Volkswagens take well to the Subaru EJ engine, which also has factory turbocharged variants.

=== European engines ===
Engine swaps are also somewhat common within the Volkswagen tuning scene, with Type 2 (Bus), Type 3, and Type 4 engines often being swapped into the Type 1 (Beetle). Later water-cooled engines, such as the GTI 16-valve four, VR6, or 1.8T are commonly swapped into the Mark 2 Golf GTI, Jetta, and Corrado, or less commonly into a Mark 1 Golf, resulting in an excellent power-to-weight ratio even with minimally modified powerplants. Porsche engines are also very popular, with one of the most popular source engines being the 1.6L flat-four from a Porsche 356.

=== Diesel engines ===
Swapping to a diesel engine for improved fuel economy is a long established practice; with modern high-efficiency diesel engines, this does not necessarily mean a reduction in performance associated with older diesel swaps. For off-road vehicles in particular, the high low-end torque of turbo-diesels makes these conversions particularly effective. However, older non-electronic-injection diesel engines are well-known for their reliability, especially in wet conditions.

=== Motorsports ===
In Super GT's GT500 class prior to the introduction of the Class 1 regulations, most cars were provided with specially modified racing engines from manufacturers, as the rules allowed for any engine to be swapped into a car as long as it is from the same manufacturer. Notable examples include Toyota using highly tuned Celica-sourced 4-cylinder engines in their Supra GT500 race cars.

=== Motorcycle engine swaps ===
Engine swaps are also very common in the motorcycle community. Bikers often replace the original engine with a different, often more powerful, motor. Riders usually perform this modification to increase the bike's top speed, improve acceleration, or simply to create a unique custom machine. For example, some enthusiasts might take a lightweight frame from a small bike, usually of about 125–300 cc (7.6–18.3 cu in), and install a high-performance engine from a sportbike. However, this process is technically challenging because it requires custom fabrication of motor mounts, adjustments to the exhaust system, and complex electrical wiring to ensure the new engine functions correctly. While it can result in a much faster vehicle, it also changes the bike's weight distribution and handling, making safety a primary concern for the builder. Examples of this are Triton and Tribsa motorcycles.

== List of commonly swapped engines ==
Note: These are the most common examples and are not an exhaustive list, just a representative cross section.

Engine	Common recipient vehicles	Displacement	Notes
BMW M50 / M52 / M54	BMW cars from 1970s-1990s - Patricularly E30	2.0–3.0 L (122–183 cu in)	Relatively easy swap depending on the car, utilising already available BMW parts. Engines easily available. Usually requires a specific oil pan from E34 in order to clear the subframe which is becoming harder to find. M54 electronically controlled throttle adds complication
Cadillac big block V8	Hot rods, kit cars, pickup trucks, 1950s-1970s GM muscle cars	7.7 or 8.2 L (472 or 500 cu in)	One of the largest displacement car engines ever mass-produced, with the biggest ones being 500 cubic inches (8.2 litres), and capable of accordingly high torque figures. Easy to acquire from scrapyards.
Chevrolet small-block V8	Hot rods, kit cars, Chevrolet Vega and S10, Nissan Z (S30), Pontiac Fiero, Austin-Healeys, Jaguar XJS and XJ6, Suzuki Vitara, light aircraft	4.3–6.6 L (265–400 cu in)	The SBC ("Small Block Chevy") was designed for a wide range of displacements in a compact package, being lighter and more compact than previous V8s of similar displacement due to improvements in metal casting techniques. It has been available in sizes ranging from 265 to 400 cu in (4.3 to 6.6 L). Mass production has made this engine quite abundant and affordable, with the most common displacement being 350 cu in (5.7 L).
Chevrolet Turbo-Air 6 F6	VW Type 1, VW Type 2, VW Karmann Ghia, light aircraft, dune buggies	2.3–2.7 L (140–164 cu in)	Not suitable for longitudinal RWD layouts as it turns counter-clockwise (as with the Honda B), though it can be used in a mid-engine layout.
Chrysler 426 Hemi V8	Hot rods, older Mopar vehicles, kit cars, dragsters	7.0 L (426 cu in)	
Chrysler LA V6/V8/V10 / Viper V10	Hot rods, kit cars, muscle cars, pickup trucks	3.9–8.4 L (238–512 cu in)	
Cummins B I4/I6	Jeeps, pickup trucks, off-road vehicles, truck pulling vehicles	3.9–6.7 L (238–409 cu in)	There are a wide variety of various adapter plates for the B series due to its wide use in agricultural and road vehicles. Normally used as a swap for its reliability, low-end torque, and fuel economy. The 4BT 4-cylinder is desirable as a diesel swap due to its compact size and lower weight compared to its 6-cylinder counterpart. Using a stock GM transmission adaptor plate for a 4BT will give the engine a slant, while Ford and Dodge adapter plates will not.
Duramax diesel V8	Pickup trucks	6.6 L (403 cu in)	Can use the TH400 automatic transmission.
Fiat Twin Cam I4	Morris Minor (until the 1990s), kit cars, hot rods	1.3–2.0 L (79–122 cu in)	Now supplanted by the lighter Rover K-series in Morris Minors.
Ford Barra I6	X-series Ford Falcons, Ford Cortinas, Ford Mustangs, Shelby GT350s	4.0 L (244 cu in)	Uses an iron block and an alloy head. Has gained world wide recognition and support, competing with the Toyota JZ series and Nissan RB series due to their tunability.
Ford Cologne V6	Hot rods, kit cars, Saab 96, other RWD Fords	1.8–4.0 L (110–244 cu in)	If installed in a Saab 96, it makes the car nose-heavy and requires relocation of the radiator to the side or rear. There is also a Cosworth-designed 24-valve version.
Ford Coyote V8	Hot rods, kit cars, Ford Mustang	5.0 L (305 cu in)	An upgraded high-performance DOHC version of the Modular V8 designed for the facelifted fifth-generation Ford Mustang.
Ford EAO I4	Hot rods, kit cars, VW Type 1	1.3–2.5 L (79–153 cu in)	A common swap for many small Fords prior to the Zetec, Duratec and EcoBoost engines, with the Cosworth version being capable of 500 bhp (370 kW).
Ford EcoBoost I4/V6	Hot rods, kit cars, Ford Mustang	1.5–3.5 L (92–214 cu in)	Becoming more popular as a replacement for the Pinto and Cosworth engines, with the V6 being an alternative to the Modular and Coyote engines.
Ford Falcon Six I6	Ford Falcon, Ford Cortina	2.4–4.1 L (144–250 cu in)	Uses a large iron block with an alloy reverse flow head (with integrated manifolds) and a pushrod valvetrain. These engines were common given the ease of swapping, with mounts, sumps, transmissions etc. being shared with the stock engine. The CF6 has been succeeded by the SOHC Intech and the DOHC Barra engines.
Ford Modular V8	Hot rods, kit cars, Ford Mustang and other pony cars	4.6–5.8 L (281–354 cu in)	Sharing many of the same components with the previous Windsor family, it replaces the cam-in-block pushrod valvetrain with an overhead cam for better high-RPM breathing, making this engine wider and taller than previous Ford variants (being about the same width as the Ford FE V8 engine). The 4.6L V8 is the most common version.
Ford Windsor V8	Hot rods, kit cars, Ford Mustang and other pony cars, Ford Ranger, Mazda MX-5, MG MGB	4.9 or 5.8 L (302 or 351 cu in)	The 351W has a higher deck height (and thus a longer potential stroke) than the 302W, but both can swap heads. The fully assembled 351W is taller and wider than the 302W, leading to the 302W being more popular for swaps into smaller cars. Early 1990s 302Ws have a high nickel content in the cast iron and are considered desirable.
Ford Zetec I4	Hot rods, kit cars, older Fords (Cortina, Escort, Anglia)	1.0–2.0 L (61–122 cu in)	Requires a Ford Type 9 transmission for rear-wheel drive layouts, though no adaptors are needed.
GM 3800 V6	Jeeps, Chevrolet S10, Pontiac Grand Am, Pontiac Fiero, hot rods, kit cars	3.8 L (232 cu in)	Conversions are popular due to the engine's prevalence in GM midsize cars and minivans from the late 1980s through mid-2000s. Even though it is a 90° V6, the engine shares the GM 60° V6 bell housing bolt pattern, so swaps between FWD and RWD transaxles and transmissions are straightforward. Can be adapted to more traditional front-engine/rear-wheel-drive setups and is a cousin of the Rover V8.
GM 60° V6	Hot rods, kit cars, Pontiac Fiero, various British sports cars, Chevrolet S10	2.5–3.4 L (153–207 cu in)	Can be fitted in both front- & rear-wheel drive applications, sharing its bell housing pattern with the Northstar and Buick V6. That said, transverse & inline engines use different blocks. A notable example is the cast-iron 3.4 L (207 cu in) L32, designed for longitudinal rear-drive applications. The high-airflow aluminum heads and intake from the 3400 as used in the Pontiac Grand Am GT are a direct bolt-on.
GM High Feature V6	Hot rods, Mazda MX-5, kit cars, late model GM cars	2.8–3.6 L (171–220 cu in)	The LFX in particular is an all-aluminum DOHC V6, though it has been succeeded by the LGX and the LFY.
GM LS V8	See: LS swap	4.8–7.4 L (293–452 cu in)	Compact and light, these engines typically use a cast iron block with aluminum heads (although some variants have an all-aluminum construction). As with the SBC, mass production has aided in availability. There are many minor improvements over the previous SBC. Although aluminum blocks remain expensive, the two most common versions for swaps are the 5.3L LM7 and the 6.0L LQ4 and LY6, all of which can be found in salvaged trucks and SUVs.
GM Northstar V8	Hot rods, kit cars, sandrails, dune buggies, light aircraft, Pontiac Fiero and other GM late models	3.5–4.6 L (214–281 cu in)	Bell housing is similar to, but slightly different from, the GM metric pattern.
GM Quad 4 I4	Hot rods, kit cars		Had a brief spurt of popularity among hot rodders because it bore an uncanny resemblance to the 1930s Offenhauser Twin-Cam.
GM/Opel Coscast C20XE I4	Austin Mini, hot rods, Lotus 7-style kit cars	2.0 L (122 cu in)	Can be fitted in RWD layouts with an Opel Manta/Omega or Ford Type 9 transmission.
Honda B I4	Honda Civic, Austin Mini, mid-engined kit cars	1.6–2.0 L (98–122 cu in)	Not suitable for longitudinal RWD layouts as it turns counter-clockwise (as with the Chevrolet Turbo-Air 6), though it can be used in a mid-engine layout. Of particular note is the B18C from the Integra Type-R, which easily bolts up to the lightweight Civic hatchback.
Honda F20C I4	Hot rods, kit cars, Toyota AE86	2.0 L (122 cu in)	Longitudinal inline-four designed for RWD applications.
Honda H I4	Honda Accord (fourth through sixth generations), Austin Mini, mid-engined kit cars	2.2 or 2.3 L (134 or 140 cu in)	1990–97 Accord engine swaps are straightforward drop-ins with minor modifications required for the wire harness, whereas the 1998–2002 Accords require swapping the driver-side mounts to fit. As this engine is also used in Formula 3 cars, it is able to be fitted into a RWD car.
Honda J V6	Honda Civic, Honda S2000, Mazda Miata, kit cars	3.2–3.7 L (195–226 cu in)	Popular in certain circles because it produces more torque than a four-cylinder. Can be used in both front- and rear-wheel drive layouts; the latter can be done with a GM TH-400 automatic transmission or the transmission from a Mazda MX-5 or Honda S2000. The most common displacement is 3.2L, though it can also be found in 3.5L and 3.7L variants.
Honda K I4	Austin Mini, Honda Civic, Honda CR-X, Honda Integra, hot rods, kit cars, Mazda MX-5	2.0–2.4 L (122–146 cu in)	The K-Series was mass-produced for a wide variety of common Honda vehicles, making it relatively affordable. It can be turbocharged and retrofitted to many smaller and lighter Honda cars, such as the Civic. K engines can be used in both front- and rear-wheel drive layouts as they rotate clockwise, and adapter plates are available to bolt one up to the transmission from a Mazda MX-5.
Land Rover 200TDI diesel I4	Land Rover series	2.5 L (153 cu in)	Equipped with Bosch mechanical injection. Used in turbocharged form with or without an intercooler, or without the turbocharger in older Land Rovers.
Mazda B I4	Hot rods, kit cars	1.1–2.0 L (67–122 cu in)	Can be used in both front- and rear-wheel drive applications, with the transmissions being used in many other applications. Adapter plates are available to fit other engines in front of it.
Mazda Wankel engines	Austin-Healey Sprite, light aircraft, Lotus 7-style kit cars, Mazda MX-5, MG Midget, Suzuki Samurai, VW Type 1, VW Type 3	0.4–2.6 L (24–159 cu in)	Very light and compact, suiting a wide variety of small RWD cars. Also popular for home-built aircraft due to their light weight and high power potential.
Mitsubishi Sirius 4G63 I4	Mitsubishi Lancer (early 5G), Eagle Summit (4G), Dodge Colt (3G and 4G), kit cars	2.0 L (122 cu in)	Fitted to many Mitsubishi models, including the Eagle Talon 1G and 2G with the DOHC turbo model. Installation into 4G and early 5G Mitsubishi Lancer variants is relatively straightforward and can use mostly standard Mitsubishi parts, as the Lancer Evolution models used essentially the same engine. Later 5G Lancer models have the 2.0L 4B11T engine and simplified transmission that result in the intake and exhaust manifolds being on opposite sides compared to the 4G63.
Nissan VQ V6	Datsun 240Z, Nissan 240SX, Nissan Maxima	2.0–4.0 L (122–244 cu in)	A narrow 60-degree all-aluminum DOHC V6. The 3.5L variant is the most commonly swapped.
Porsche F6	VW Type 1, VW Type 2, VW Type 3, light aircraft, trikes	2.0–4.0 L (122–244 cu in)	Firewall must be cut out to fit vintage air-cooled VWs, and the resulting vehicles can be tail-heavy.
Rover K I4	Morris Minor-based hot rods, Austin-Healey Sprite, MG Midget, Lotus 7-style kit cars, Austin Mini	1.1–1.8 L (67–110 cu in)	Requires a Ford Type 9 transmission for rear-wheel drive conversions. Weighs less than the Austin A-series engine.
Rover MDi / Perkins Prima diesel I4	Land Rover series	2.0 L (122 cu in)	Equipped with Bosch mechanical injection. Used in turbocharged form on older Land Rovers. Donor vehicles had no intercoolers.
Rover V8	Various British sports cars, Hot rods, kit cars, light aircraft	3.5–5.0 L (214–305 cu in)	This small aluminum-block V8 weighs less than some iron-block four-cylinder engines. Typically mated to a T5 gearbox as used in Cosworth-powered rear-wheel drive Fords – this requires the correct bellhousing (usually available off the shelf), similar to TVRs. British Leyland's LT77 (as used in the Sherpa van and Rover SD1) may also be used, but wear can be a problem in units having been driven well over 70,000 miles. Later LDV Pilot vans used a two-wheel-drive version of the stronger Land Rover R380 transmission that was developed from the LT77.
Saab H I4	Saab 99, BMWs	1.8–2.3 L (110–140 cu in)	16V turbo engines are easily tunable and highly available. May also fit in Triumph Herald and Triumph Dolomite as it is derived from the Triumph slant-four engine, and could bolt up to the Triumph 5-speed transmission.
Subaru EJ F4	VW Type 1, VW Type 2, VW Type 3, light aircraft, kit cars, dune buggies, motorized tricycles	1.5–2.5 L (92–153 cu in)	This liquid-cooled flat-four engine has a factory turbocharged version that is quite desirable for certain applications. Adaptors are available off the shelf for a wide variety of swaps, provided the automatic transmission models are not used.
Suzuki G I3/I4	MG Midget, Austin-Healey Sprite, Austin Mini, Morris Minor, light aircraft	1.0–1.6 L (61–98 cu in)	Requires a Suzuki Swift transaxle in the Austin Mini, but bolts up to a Suzuki five-speed truck gearbox for RWD cars (the transfer case is separate).
Toyota 3RZ-FE I4	Toyota Hilux, Toyota 4Runner	2.7 L (165 cu in)	Older Hiluxes were equipped with 4-cylinder engines ranging from 90 hp (67 kW) and 122 ft-lbs torque (1979-80 carbureted versions) to 135 hp (101 kW) and 173 ft-lbs torque (rare 1986-87 turbocharged versions). These older engines have relatively low compression ratios ranging from 7.5:1 to 9:1; when used in a daily-driven rock crawler, an average fuel economy of 12–16 miles per gallon is expected. The much improved 3RZ-FE engine features a 9.5:1 compression ratio and uses newer technology such as a hot wire mass airflow sensor, knock sensor, and a narrow angle DOHC cylinder head. The result is a more efficient and more powerful engine, achieving 17–21 miles per gallon in rock crawler applications. Additionally, the 3RZ-FE uses the same W-series family of transmissions as the older fuel-injected Hilux, so an older W56 transmission may be used with the new 3RZ-FE by using the W59 bellhousing. The 3RZ-FE flywheel and clutch components are also fully compatible, making it a great replacement engine for old Hiluxes.
Toyota 4A I4	Toyota MR2, Toyota Corolla, kit cars, Morris Minor	1.6 L (98 cu in)	The 4A engine was offered in different configurations ranging from 90 to 170 hp (67 to 127 kW). The high-performance variants included either a five-valve-per-cylinder configuration or a Roots supercharger. Conversions are popular due to a vast aftermarket and many compatible parts between engine versions. Some conversions are very easy; for instance, the supercharged 4A-GZE engine and electronic fuel injection system are a direct plug-and-play conversion into a non-supercharged AW11 MR2; even the supercharged model's wiring harness plugs directly into the non-supercharged model's chassis harness. The non-SC flywheel, clutch, C56-type transaxle, and axles can all be directly fitted to the SC engine with no modifications, making conversions less of a hassle. FWD variants are also able to be converted to RWD. Also one of the common swaps for the Morris Minor, using a Toyota T50 5-speed manual gearbox.
Toyota JZ I6	Toyota Celica Supra, Lexus SC, Lexus IS, Nissan 240SX, Nissan 350Z, Mazda RX-7	2.5 or 3.0 L (153 or 183 cu in)	Models designated A61 have off-the-shelf adaptors for a 1JZ or 2JZ engine.
Toyota UZ V8	Older RWD Toyota cars and trucks including the Hilux and Supra, hot rods, kit cars, light aircraft	4.0–4.7 L (244–287 cu in)	Commonly sourced from the Lexus LS and other Lexus vehicles.
Triumph pre-unit engines	Triton motorcycles	650 cc (40 cu in)	These are Triumph engines in Norton Featherbed frames. The idea was to combine the best engine with the best frame to create the best of both worlds—namely, a high power-to-weight ratio.
Volkswagen 1.9 TDI I4	Suzuki Samurai, Chevrolet Tracker, Suzuki Vitara	1.9 L (116 cu in)	Aftermarket kits make this a straightforward conversion, but it may also be possible to use the equivalent petrol engine with them too. A kit could be adapted to a small hot rod or kit car with the petrol engine.

== See also ==
- Bike-engined car
- Electric vehicle conversion
