= LS swap =

Type of engine swap

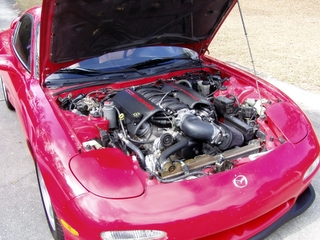
Mazda RX-7 (FD) with an LS1 V8 swap

An LS swap is a type of engine swap using any form factor of General Motors's LS V8 engine series. LS swaps have been performed since the introduction of GM's LS1 engine in 1997. Widespread aftermarket support for LS swaps has developed in subsequent years. Motor Trend noted in 2020 that "the Chevy LS V-8 engine has become the de facto engine swap suggestion for anyone seeking to add power to their existing platform" due to the engine's relatively compact size and light weight.

== See also ==
- List of GM engines
