= Michelle Christensen =

American car designer

Michelle Christensen is an American car designer. She was Acura's first female exterior designer. Christensen has worked for Acura and was the lead designer of the second generation Honda NSX.

== Life ==
Christensen grew up in San Jose, California. She learned about the mechanics of cars from her father, who was into hot rods and muscle cars. In school she developed an interest in drawing and fine art and at community college she learned about car design and went on to study at Art Center College of Design in Pasadena. Christensen said that car design is the ideal blend of her passions, "art, cars, and making things for people."

Christensen undertook an internship at Volvo's Camarillo studio in California before joining Acura in 2005. She briefly worked for General Motors in 2010 before returning to Acura as Lead Principal Designer at Honda R&D. The 2016 Honda NSX was her first project as the lead designer. Christensen received the Woman on Top award from Marie Claire magazine.

In 2018, Christensen worked briefly at Faraday Future and then was appointed Senior Manager of Design with Nissan Design America.

She is vice-president of design for Karma Automotive.

== Car designs ==
- Acura ZDX (concept design) 2009
- Acura RDX
- Acura RL sedan facelift
- Acura RLX sedan
- Honda NSX (second generation) 2015
