= Acura ZDX =

Mid-size luxury crossover SUV

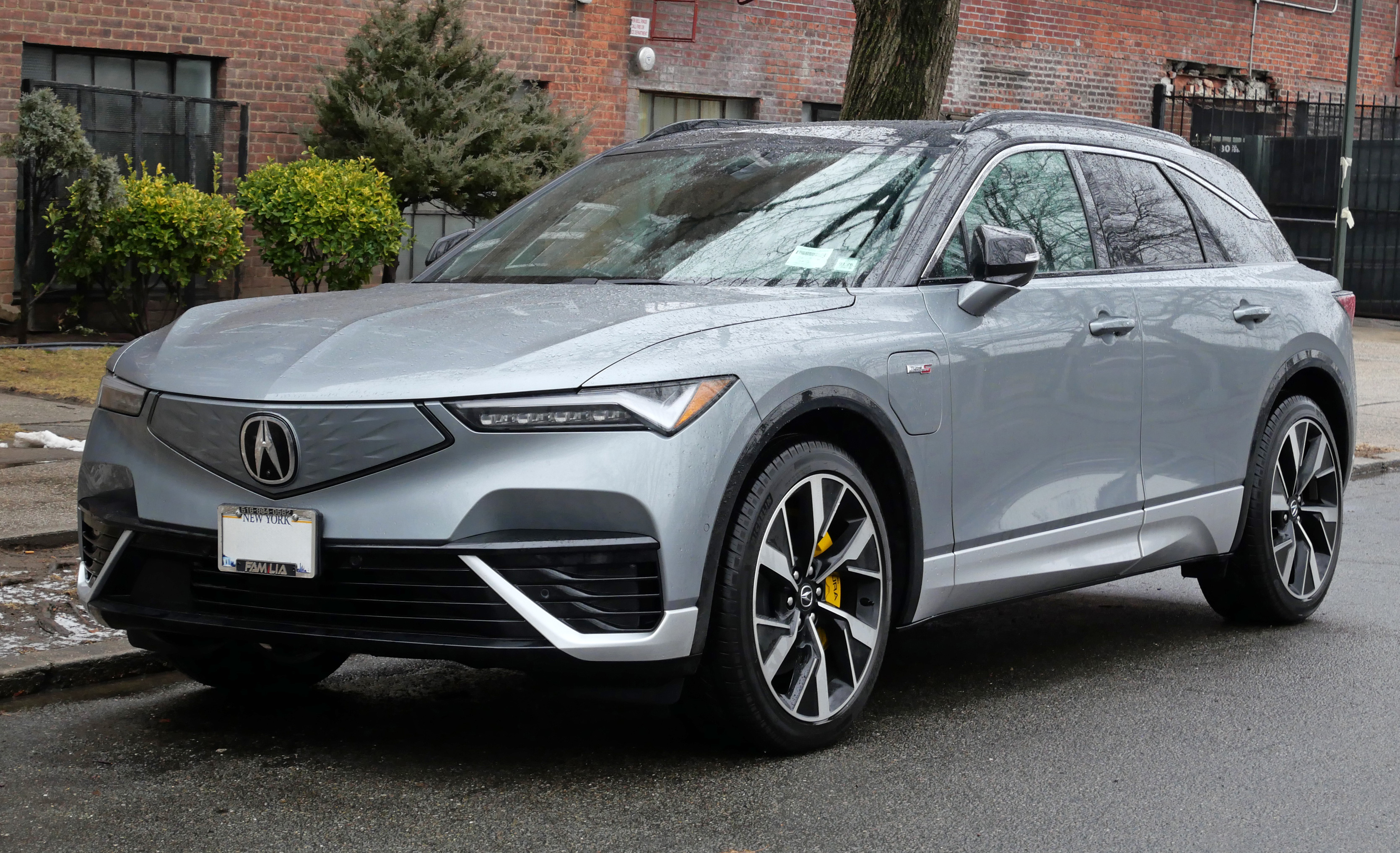
- 2024 Acura ZDX Type S

Overview
- Manufacturer: Honda
- Production: 2009–2013; 2024–2025
- Model years: 2010–2013; 2024

Body and chassis
- Class: Mid-size luxury crossover SUV
- Body style: 5-door coupé SUV (2009–2013); 5-door SUV (2024–2025)

The Acura ZDX is a mid-size luxury crossover SUV developed by Japanese manufacturer Honda for its upmarket brand Acura.

The first-generation ZDX debuted at the 2009 New York International Auto Show on April 8, 2009, as a 2010 model. The vehicle was the first to be completely designed at Acura's Southern California design studio in Torrance. Lead designer Michelle Christensen labeled it a "4-door luxury sports coupe" due to its sloping rear roofline, and Acura says it "blurs the distinction between coupe, sedan and sport utility vehicle."

The ZDX features Acura's first six speed automatic transmission, advanced ventilated seats, as well as other luxury appointments. Although the ZDX shares a similar profile with the Honda Crosstour, the two vehicles are not mechanically related: the latter is based on the Honda Accord, while the ZDX is based on the Honda Pilot/Acura MDX.

The ZDX nameplate returned to Acura's lineup in 2024 as the brand's first electric vehicle. It was co-developed with General Motors. In September 2025, Acura announced its discontinuation and planned to introduce the RSX as their electric vehicle offering in 2026.

== Concept version ==
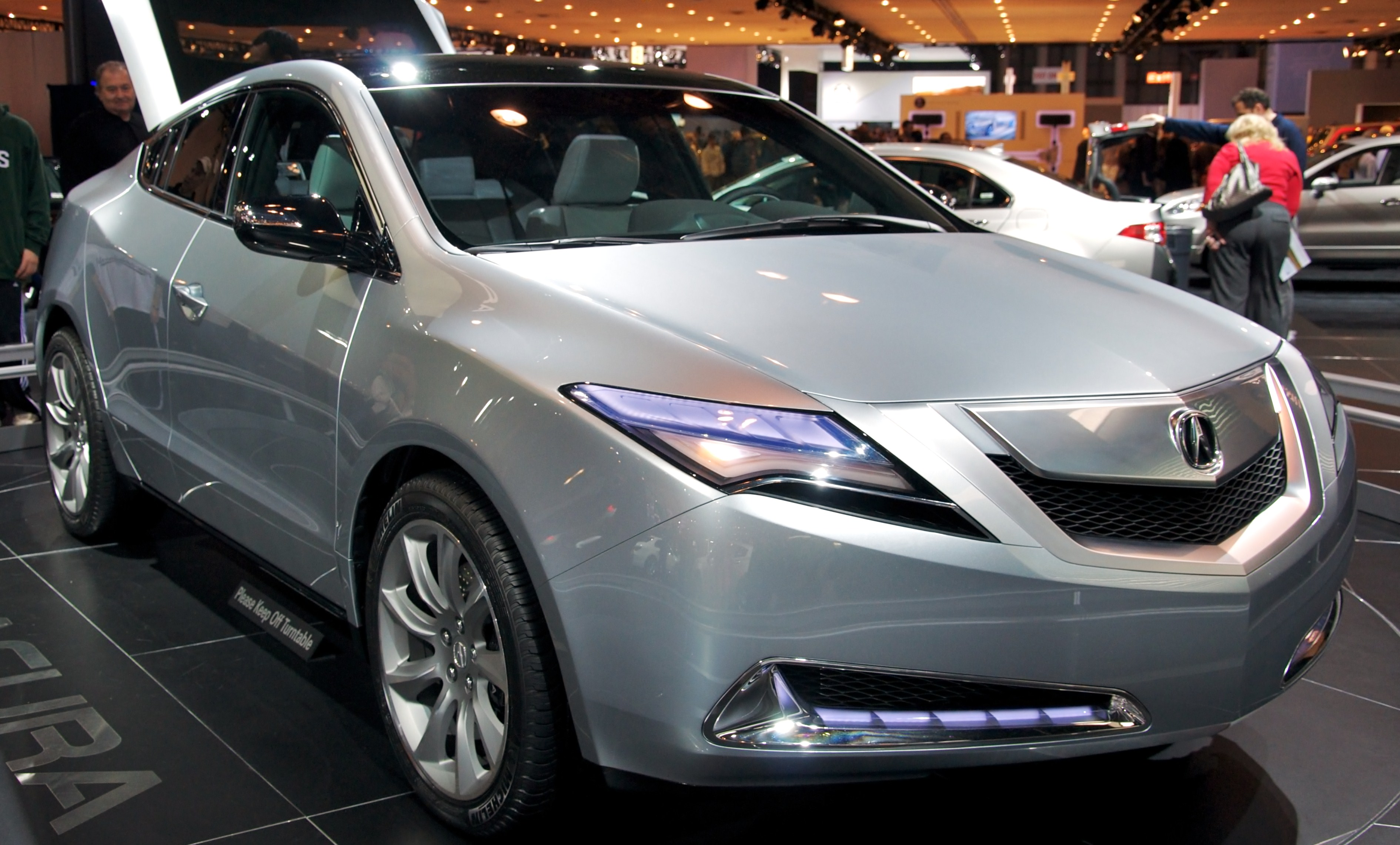
The ZDX concept

Teaser shots released by Acura in March 2009 indicated a coupe-like sloping roofline akin to that of the BMW X6. The car was originally planned to be called the "MSX". After naming the vehicle ZDX, Acura added the words "Luxury Four-Door Sports Coupe" to the caption for each picture. Moreover, it did not state the vehicle as a crossover or an SUV. The automaker translated the designers renderings closely into production form.

== First generation (YB1; 2010) ==
First generation
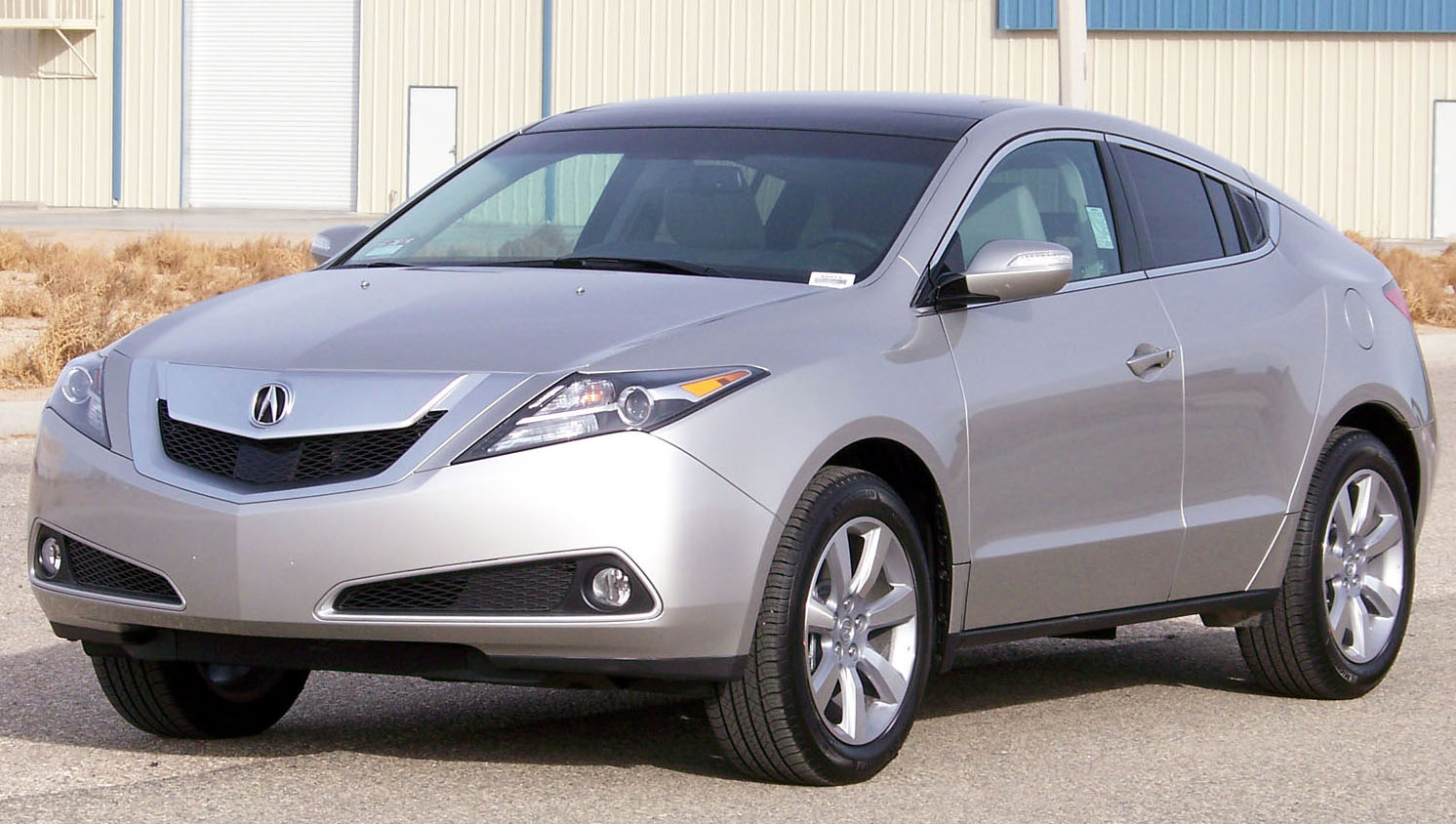

Overview
- Model code: YB1
- Production: 2009–2013
- Model years: 2010–2013
- Assembly: Alliston, Ontario, Canada (HCM)
- Designer: Michelle Christensen

Body and chassis
- Layout: Front-engine, four-wheel-drive
- Related: Acura MDX; Honda Pilot

Powertrain
- Engine: 3.7 L J37A5 V6 (gasoline)
- Transmission: 6-speed automatic

Dimensions
- Wheelbase: 108.3 in (2,751 mm)
- Length: 192.4 in (4,887 mm)
- Width: 78.5 in (1,994 mm)
- Height: 62.8 in (1,595 mm)
- Curb weight: 4,452 lb (2,019 kg)

Chronology
- Successor: Acura RDX; Acura MDX

The production version of the Acura ZDX includes a 3,664 cc (3.664 L; 223.6 cu in) SOHC VTEC V6 all-aluminum gasoline engine produces 300 bhp (220 kW) at 6300 rpm and 270 lb⋅ft (366 N⋅m) at 4500 rpm, 6-speed automatic transmission, Super Handling All-Wheel Drive (SH-AWD), 19-inch, 7-spoke alloy wheels, panoramic glass roof with movable sunshades, hand-stitched leather interior, HandsFreeLink Bluetooth connectivity, power tailgate, and a high-powered audio system with CD player, AM/FM/XM Satellite Radio and USB audio interface with iPod integration. Sales began in winter 2009.

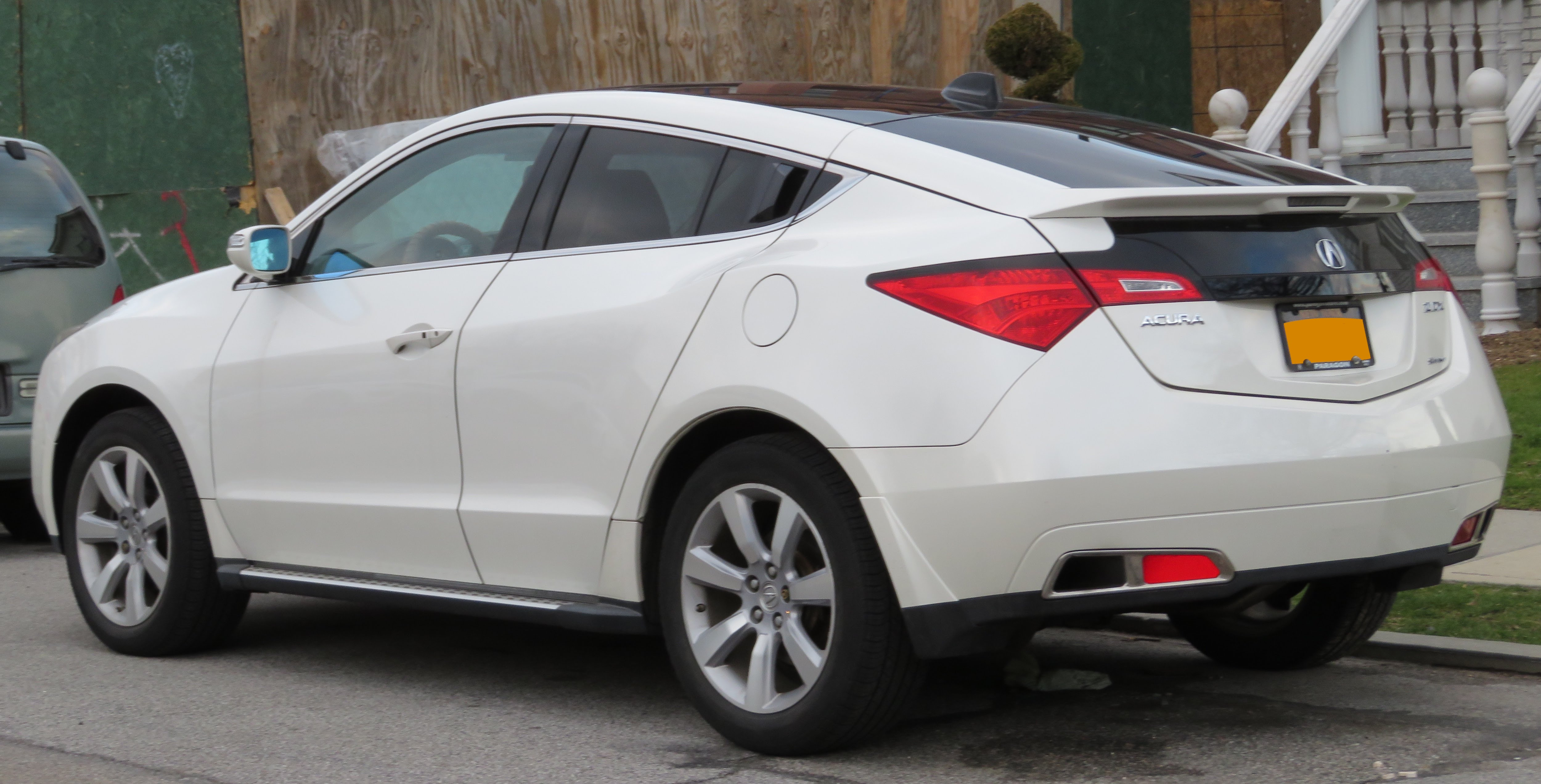
Acura ZDX

The Technology Package adds the Navigation System with voice recognition, an Acura/ELS Surround premium audio system and a new multi-view rear camera. Advance Package adds blind spot monitoring system, Collision Mitigating Braking System (CMBS), Adaptive Cruise Control (ACC) and Integrated Dynamics System (IDS), which brought multiple modes of suspension firmness and response using electronically controlled Magneto-Rheological shock absorbers.

For the 2013 model year, Acura sold the ZDX in only one trim level. Acura cut costs by eliminating CMBS, ACC and IDS and replaced them with Forward Collision Warning (FCW), Lane Departure Warning (LDW), redesigned front grille, integrated parking sensors, power-folding auto-dimming side mirrors, and new dark accents for the wheels. This resulted in a lower retail price than the previous year's Advance model.

United States Environmental Protection Agency (EPA) fuel consumption estimates for all models are 16 mpg_{‑US} (15 L/100 km; 19 mpg_{‑imp}) in the city, 22 mpg_{‑US} (11 L/100 km; 26 mpg_{‑imp}) on the highway and 19 mpg_{‑US} (12 L/100 km; 23 mpg_{‑imp}) combined.

=== Discontinuation ===
The ZDX was discontinued after the 2013 model year due to poor sales, and in a statement from Honda, "as the Acura brand sharpens its focus on new models and core products." The ZDX was the rarest of US-manufactured Acura offerings, with a total of 7,191 vehicles produced and sold in North America.

=== Safety ===
NHTSA 2012 Acura ZDX:
Overall:	5/5 stars
Frontal Driver:	5/5 stars
Frontal Passenger:	4/5 stars
Side Driver:	5/5 stars
Side Passenger:	5/5 stars
Side Pole Driver:	5/5 stars
Rollover:	/ 13.0%

=== Sales ===
Calendar year	US Sales
2009	79
2010	3,259
2011	1,564
2012	775
2013	362
2014	78
2015	2

== Second generation (2024) ==
Second generation
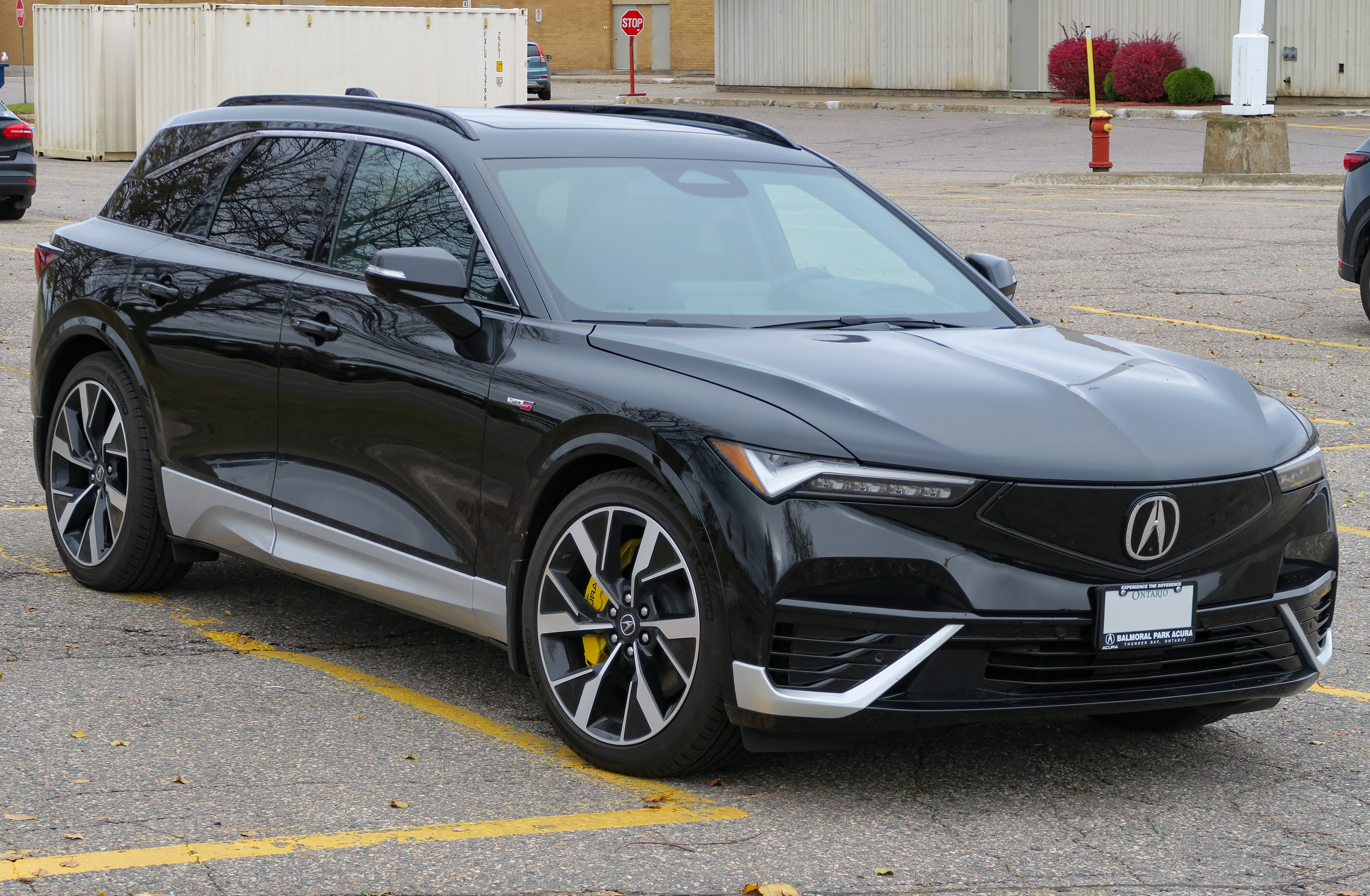
- 2024 Acura ZDX Type S

Overview
- Production: March 2024 – September 2025
- Model years: 2024
- Assembly: United States: Spring Hill, Tennessee (GM Spring Hill Manufacturing)

Body and chassis
- Layout: Rear-motor, rear-wheel-drive; Dual-motors, all-wheel-drive
- Platform: GM BEV3
- Related: Cadillac Lyriq; Honda Prologue; Chevrolet Blazer EV

Powertrain
- Electric motor: Permanent magnet motor
- Power output: 358 hp (363 PS; 267 kW) (A-Spec RWD); 490 hp (497 PS; 365 kW) (A-Spec AWD); 500 hp (507 PS; 373 kW) (Type S AWD)
- Battery: 102 kWh Ultium lithium-ion
- Electric range: Up to 278–313 mi (447–504 km) EPA
- Plug-in charging: 190 kW (DC)

Dimensions
- Wheelbase: 121.8 in (3,094 mm)
- Length: 197.7 in (5,022 mm)
- Width: 77.0 in (1,956 mm)
- Height: 64.4 in (1,636 mm)
- Curb weight: 5,421–6,052 lb (2,459–2,745 kg)

Acura unveiled the all-electric ZDX in August 2023. The first EV in Acura's lineup, the new ZDX is co-developed using General Motors' Ultium vehicle architecture that underpins the Cadillac Lyriq, Chevrolet Blazer EV and the Honda Prologue, itself slated for a 2024 release. Similar to the Prologue, it shares many components with the Blazer EV, including the steering wheel, climate setting controls, and door handles. Additionally, it shares its powertrain with the Cadillac Lyriq.

Compared to the original ZDX, the 2nd generation ZDX has a more traditional roofline. The ZDX gains an A-Spec single-motor configuration, and a Type S performance variant, the latter of which is estimated to give 500hp, making it the most powerful SUV ever produced by Acura.

It is the first Acura to implement several technologies and features. The standard 18-speaker Bang & Olufsen audio system marks the debut of Acura's partnership with the company. The infotainment system has Google Built-in, which is the first implementation of Android Automotive in an Acura, though it is a reskin of GM's version rather than the Honda developed version seen in the Accord. Additionally, the ZDX has a new hands-free highway driving assistance system called AcuraWatch 360+ with Hands Free Cruise.

Production of the ZDX began in early 2024 with sales starting in May 2024. Through November 2024, ZDX sales totaled 5,543. In May 2025, sales totaled 1,873 units. From January through May 2025, 9,017 units were sold.

In September 2025 it was announced that ZDX production had ended after a year and a half due to low sales numbers. It was only produced from March of 2024 to September of 2025. At the time of the announcement, the ZDX was supposed to start production for the 2026 model year after skipping the 2025 model year.

In May 2026, Honda issued a safety recall for 2024 and 2025 Honda Prologue and 2024 Acura ZDX models over issues with the backup camera and moisture getting inside the camera housing causing fog or complete failure of the system. The recall affected 44,199 Prologues and 15,688 ZDXs.

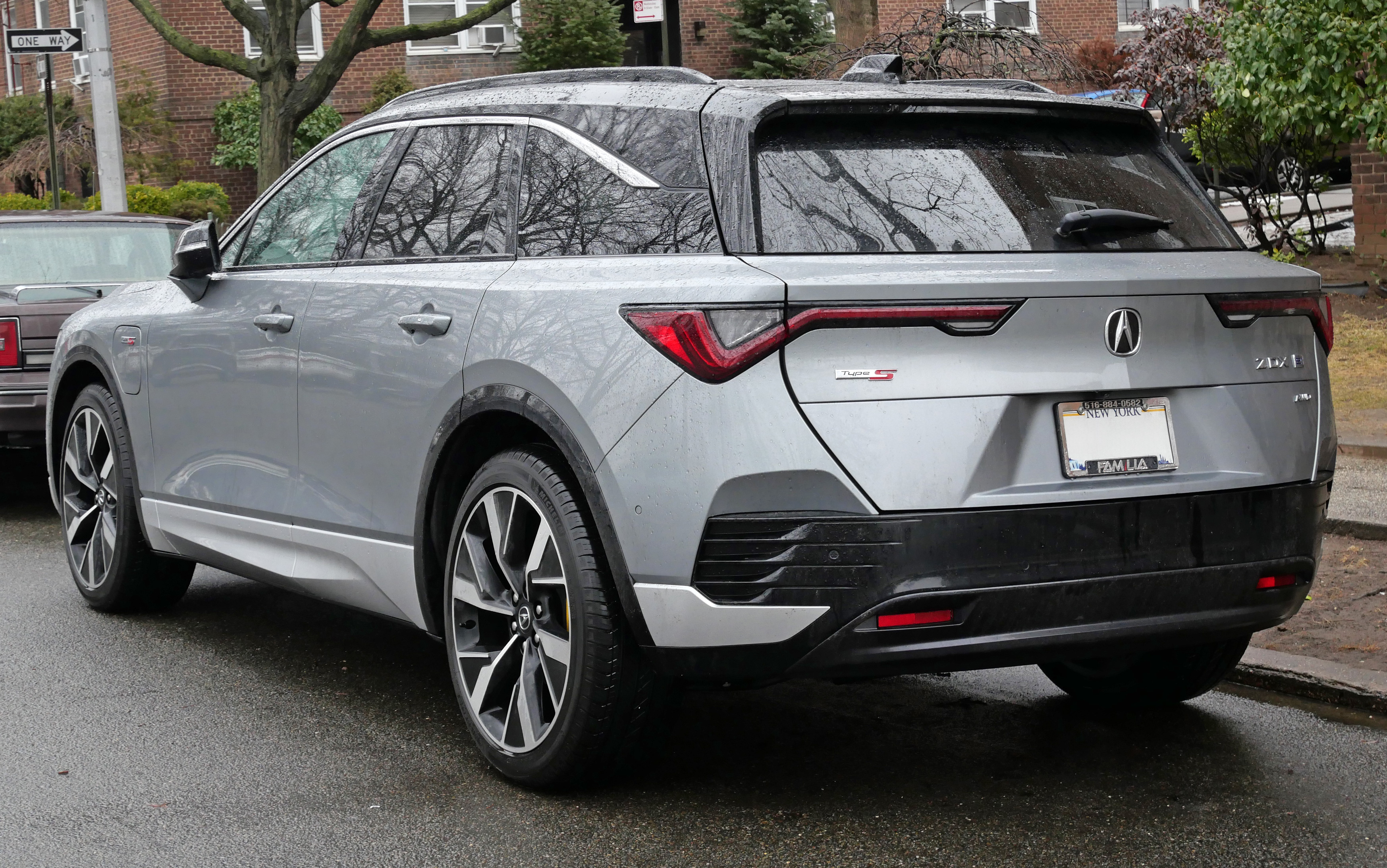
Rear view

=== Powertrain ===
The ZDX has three different powertrain options. First is the base single-motor, rear-wheel drive A-Spec which outputs 358 hp (267 kW; 363 PS) and 324 lb⋅ft (439 N⋅m) of torque. The all-wheel drive A-Spec has an additional motor powering the front wheels and makes 490 hp (365 kW; 497 PS) and 437 lb⋅ft (592 N⋅m) of torque. The highest output version of this setup is used in the Type S, where it produces a slightly increased 499 hp (372 kW; 506 PS) and a significantly higher 544 lb⋅ft (738 N⋅m) of torque.

All versions use GM's 102 kWh lithium-ion modular Ultium battery, which is also used in the Cadillac Lyriq. It allows the single-motor A-Spec model an EPA range of 313 miles (504 km), while the dual-motor version achieves 304 miles (489 km). The Type S, which has larger 22-inch wheels, achieves a lower 278 miles (447 km) of range. The ZDX can DC fast charge at up to 190 kW, which Acura claims allows single motor models to add 81 miles (130 km) of range in 10 minutes, and can charge the battery from twenty to eighty percent in 42 minutes. An onboard AC charger allows for a claimed charging rate of 29.4 miles (47.3 km) per hour.

All versions have a maximum towing capacity of 3,500 lb (1,600 kg).

=== Sales ===
Calendar year	US Sales
2024	7,391
2025	12,005
