= Honda Marine =

American boat engine manufacturer and division of Honda

Honda Marine logo

Honda Marine is an American company headquartered in Alpharetta, Georgia. Honda Marine is part of "Honda’s Power Products" division. They build a full line of four-stroke outboard marine engines. They were the second U.S. company to build a four-stroke marine outboard engine. They manufactured the first marine engine in 1964. Many of the engine concepts and technologies are taken from their automotive engines used in popular vehicles such as the Accord and Odyssey. The BF115, 130, and 150 engines uses a power head based on the same 2.4L K24 VTEC engine used in the Honda Accord. The BF200, 225, and 250 use engines derived from Honda's J35A series of engines used in larger vehicles such as Pilot, Odyssey, and Ridgeline. Honda offered a five-year no-declining warranty on their engines. Honda expanded its well known Variable Valve Timing & Lift Electronic Control (VTEC) technology to marine engines in the 2000s. VTEC varies the lift and duration of the intake valve opening, enhances performance at both low and high RPM. It provides a broad, flat torque curve and smooth power delivery. Their full lineup of engine models are of four-stroke design.

== Products ==
=== Mid-range models (25HP – 100HP) 2019 ===
Model	HP	Cylinders	Cam	Engine displacement	Fuel delivery	Alternator
BF25	25	3	SOHC	552cc	3 carburetors	10Amp
BF30	30	3	SOHC	552cc	3 carburetors	10Amp
BF40	40	3	SOHC	808cc	Programmed fuel injection	22Amp
BF50	50	3	SOHC	808cc	Programmed fuel injection	22Amp
BF60	60	3	SOHC	998cc	Programmed fuel injection	22Amp
BFP60	60	3	SOHC	998cc	Programmed fuel injection	27Amp
BF75	75	4	SOHC	1496cc	Programmed fuel injection	44Amp
BF90	90	4	SOHC	1496cc	Programmed fuel injection	44Amp
BF100	100	4	SOHC	1496cc	Programmed fuel injection	44Amp

=== High-powered models (115HP – 250HP) 2019 ===
Model	HP	Cylinders	Cam	Engine displacement	Fuel delivery	Alternator
BF115	115HP	4Cyl	DOHC	2354cc	Programmed fuel injection	55Amp
BF135	135	4Cyl	DOHC	2354cc	Programmed fuel injection	51Amp
BF150	150	4Cyl	DOHC	2354cc	Programmed fuel injection	51Amp
BF200	200	V6	SOHC	3583cc	Programmed fuel injection	90Amp
BF225	225	V6	SOHC	3583cc	Programmed fuel injection	90Amp
BF250	250	V6	SOHC	3583cc	Programmed fuel injection	90Amp
BF350	350	V8	SOHC	4952cc	Programmed fuel injection	93Amp
