= Honda Crosstour =

Car produced by Honda, 2009–2015

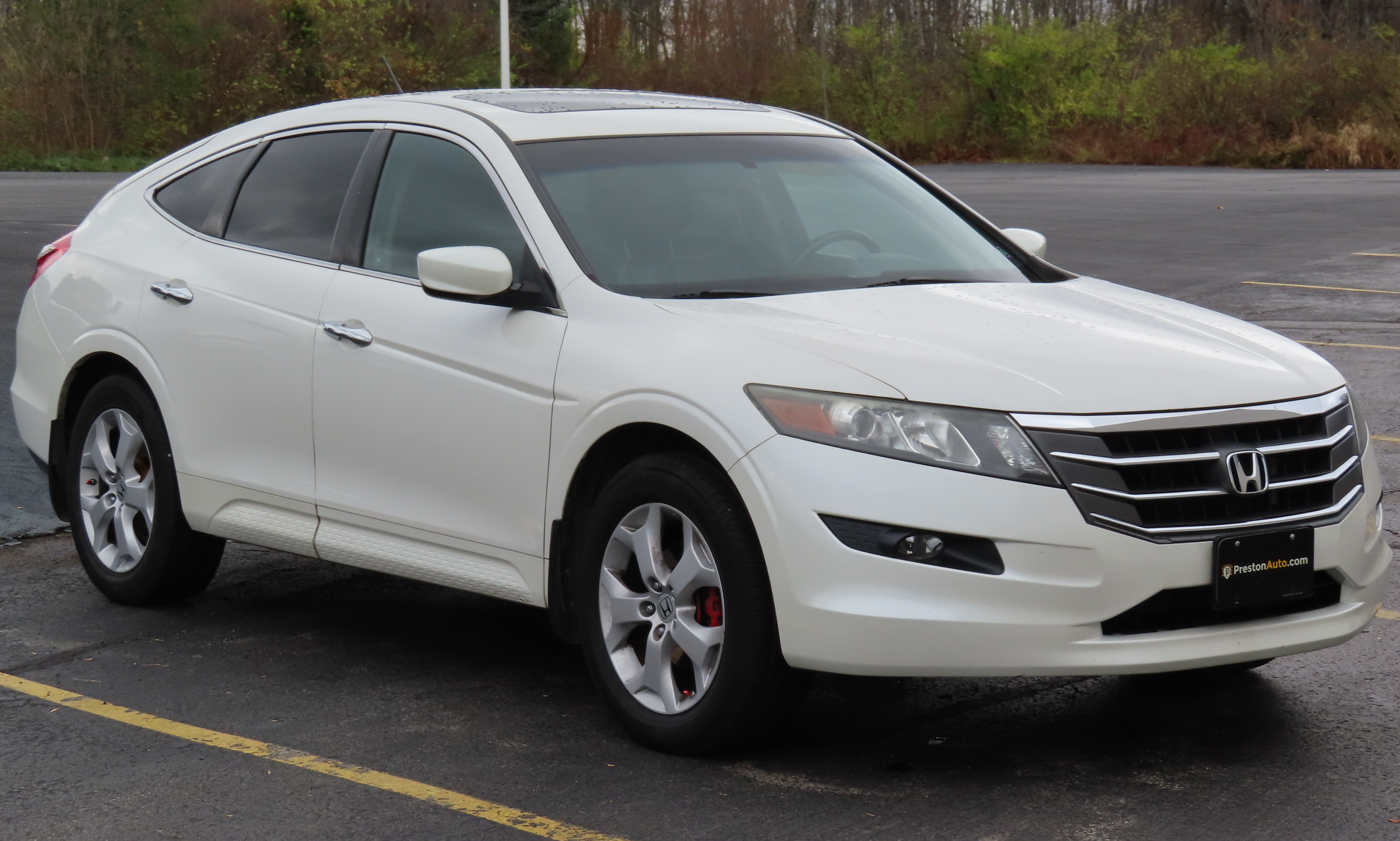
- 2010 Honda Accord Crosstour EX-L (US)

Overview
- Manufacturer: Honda
- Model code: TF1/2
- Also called: Honda Accord Crosstour (2010–2011)
- Production: September 2009 – August 2015
- Model years: 2010–2015
- Assembly: United States: East Liberty, Ohio (ELAP); China: Guangzhou (Guangqi Honda)

Body and chassis
- Class: Mid-size crossover SUV
- Body style: 5-door coupe SUV
- Layout: Front-engine, front-wheel-drive Front-engine, four-wheel-drive
- Platform: Honda D-5
- Related: Honda Accord (North America eighth generation)

Powertrain
- Engine: 2.4-liter K24Y2 I4; 3.0-liter J30A5 V6 (China-only); 3.5-liter J35Z2 V6 (2010–2012); 3.5-liter J35Y1 V6 (2013–2015)
- Transmission: 5-speed automatic (4-cylinder, 2010–2012 V6); 6-speed automatic (2013–2015 V6)

Dimensions
- Wheelbase: 110.1 in (2,797 mm)
- Length: 195.8 in (4,973 mm)
- Width: 74.7 in (1,897 mm)
- Height: 65.7 in (1,669 mm)
- Curb weight: 4,105 lb (1,862 kg)

Chronology
- Predecessor: Honda Accord wagon
- Successor: Honda Avancier (crossover)

The Honda Crosstour (initially branded the Accord Crosstour) is a mid-size crossover SUV with a sloping rear roofline manufactured by Japanese automaker Honda. It is based on the North American eighth-generation Accord. Sales began in November 2009 for the 2010 model year, and the vehicle was discontinued after the 2015 model year due to slow sales.

== Design ==
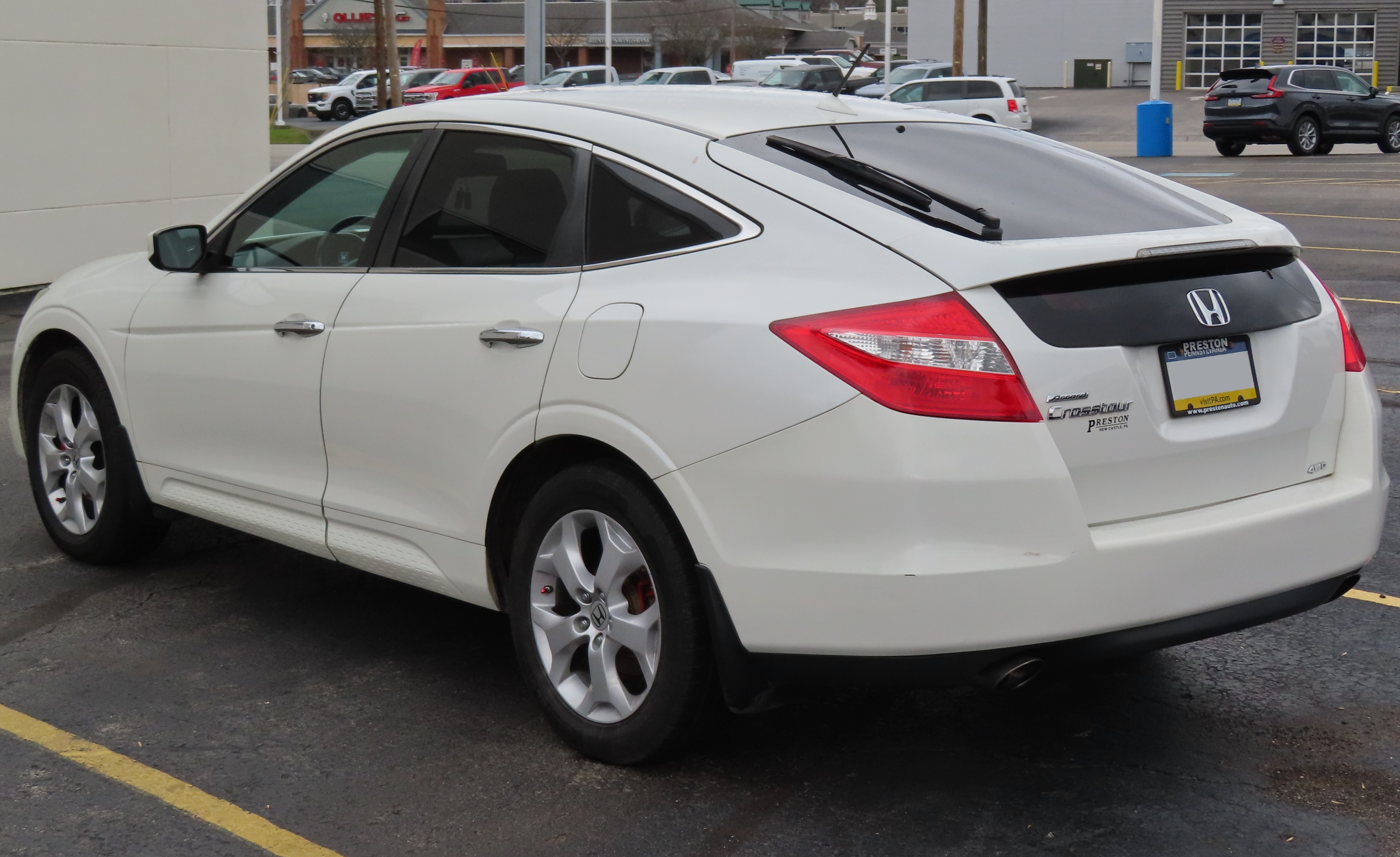
2010 Honda Accord Crosstour EX-L (US)

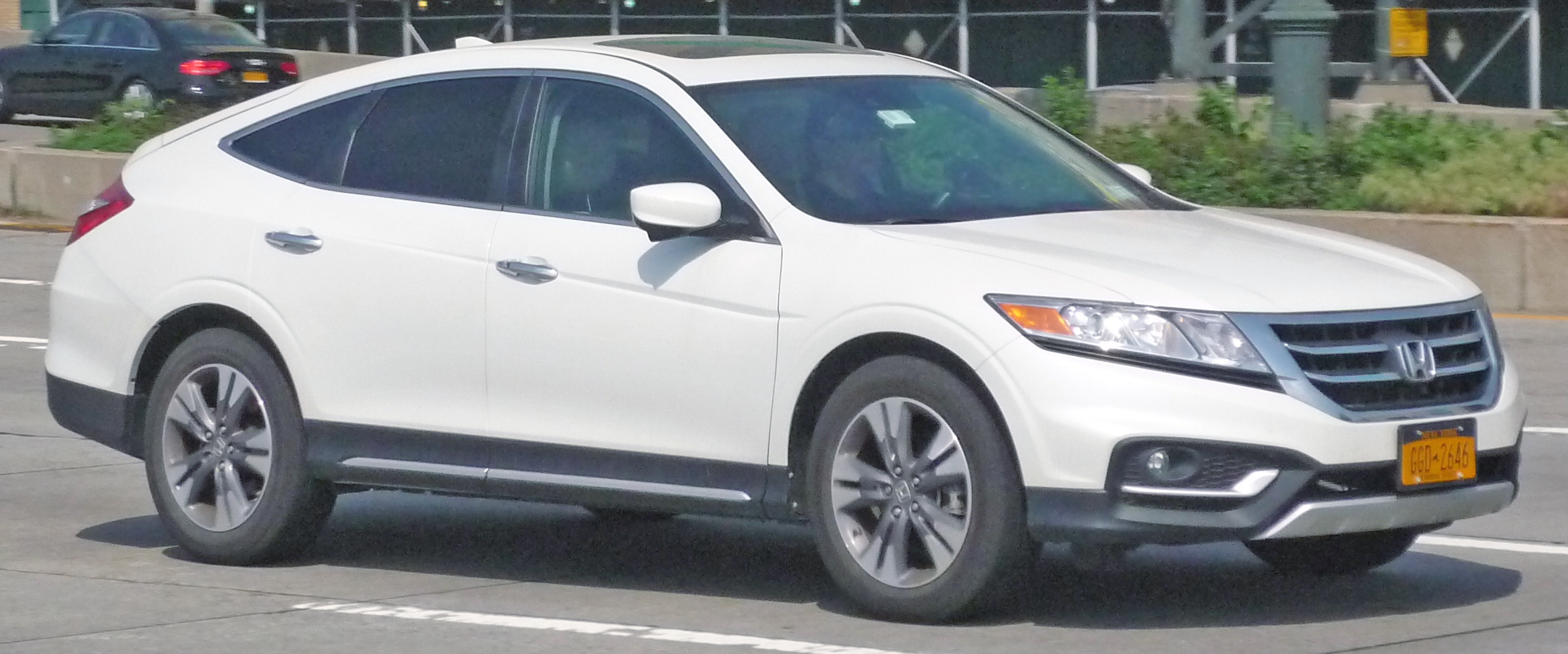
2013–2015 Honda Crosstour (US; facelift)

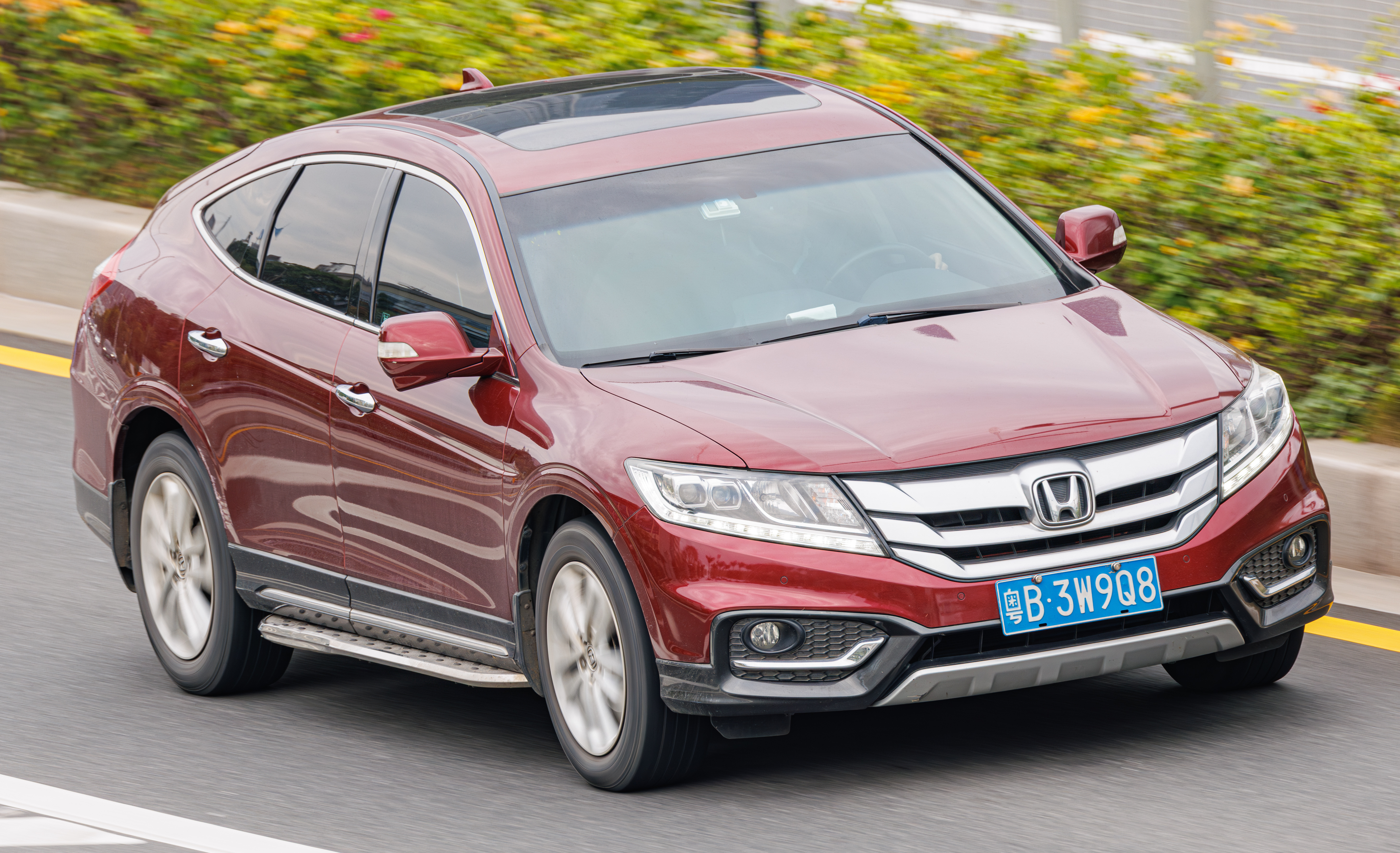

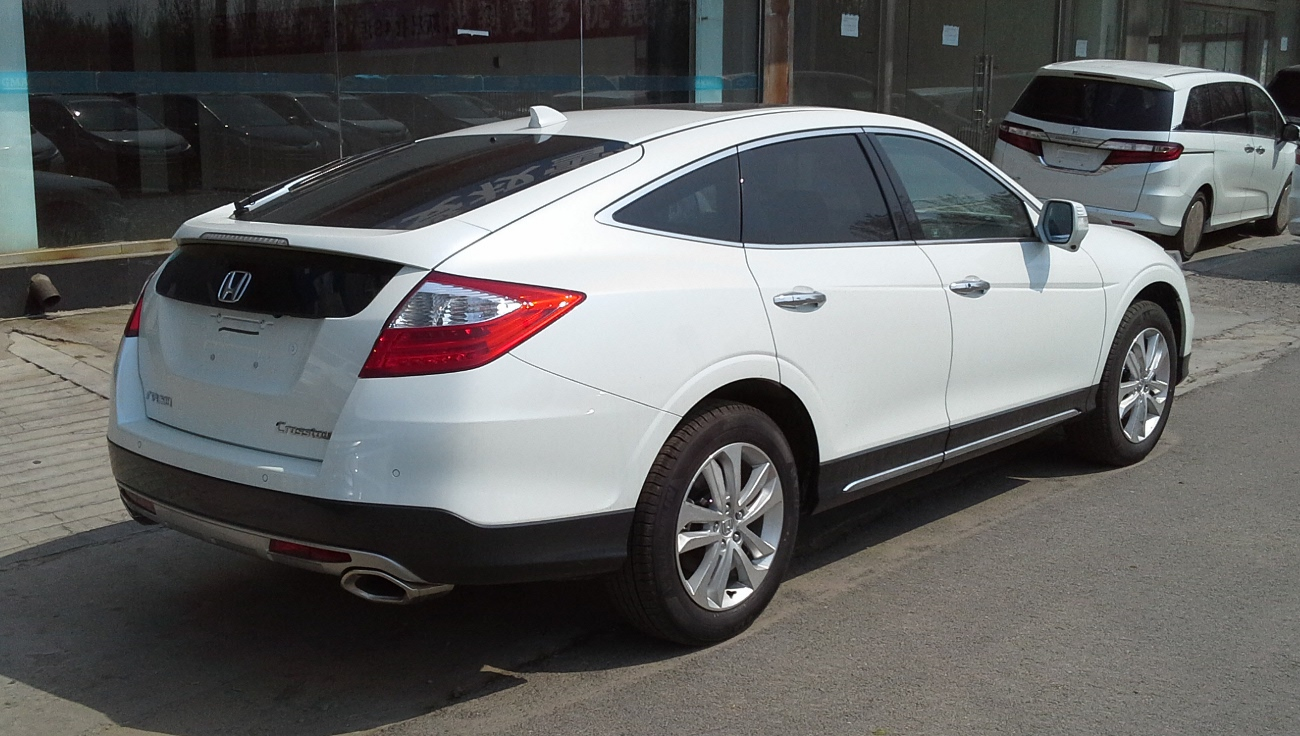
Honda Crosstour (China; facelift)

The Crosstour was marketed as a "hatchback"/"wagon" variation of the Accord and shared the same platform. The Crosstour was powered by a 3.5-liter V6 engine (choice of either front-wheel or all-wheel drive) or 2.4-liter 4-cylinder engine (front-wheel drive only), with prices that started at $29,670, above those of the Accord sedan (which started at under $23,000). For the 2012 model year, Honda removed the "Accord" prefix, making the name just "Crosstour", and gave its front grille a restyle. A four-cylinder engine for front-wheel drive models was released in late 2011 and put on sale in early 2012.

The Crosstour was a direct competitor to the Toyota Venza, a crossover wagon based upon the Accord's perennial competitor, the Camry. And like the Venza, which was meant to replace the Camry wagon, the Crosstour was considered a successor to the Accord wagon.

In terms of positioning, the Crosstour slotted between the compact CR-V and fullsize Pilot in Honda's crossover SUV lineup, Compared to the Pilot, the Crosstour was longer but had two rows of seating compared to the Pilot's three and had approximately 50 cubic feet less interior space. While the Crosstour was developed on the eighth-generation Accord platform, the similarly styled Acura ZDX, launched in the same period, used the different platform shared by the Honda Pilot and Acura MDX.

The Crosstour was sold in the United States, Canada, Mexico, China, Middle East, Southeast Asia and Russia. Guangqi Honda built and marketed the Crosstour in China.

=== Facelift ===
For the 2013 model year, Honda refreshed the Crosstour. A concept vehicle of the Crosstour was unveiled at the New York International Auto Show on April 4, 2012. The revised 2013 Crosstour went on sale on November 20, 2012 with a $500 reduction in price along with increased standard content. The interior was redesigned, with a more powerful and fuel efficient J35Y1 V6 engine coupled to a 6-speed automatic replacing the previous J35Z2 V6 and 5-speed automatic. Fuel economy for V6 models was improved to an EPA-estimated 20/30/23 mpg (city/highway/combined) for front-wheel-drive and 19/28/22 mpg for all-wheel-drive. Inside a 10-way power (2-way lumbar) driver's seat and auto-dimming rearview mirror also became standard on all trims.

=== Discontinuation ===
On April 8, 2015, Honda announced that it was discontinuing production on the Crosstour at the end of the 2015 model year due to slow sales. Its final production date was August 31, 2015. Another factor in Honda's decision was to free up space on the production line for the CR-V, Acura RDX and also the Acura MDX in 2017.

Although the Crosstour was discontinued globally, Honda later introduced the Honda Avancier in China in 2016, which effectively served as its spiritual successor in that market. The Avancier is a mid-size crossover SUV developed specifically for the Chinese market by the Guangqi Honda joint venture. Its design and concept were previewed by the Honda Concept D, a bold SUV prototype unveiled at the 2015 Auto Shanghai that showcased Honda’s vision for a high-end, China-exclusive crossover. The production Avancier features a more conventional SUV body style compared to the Crosstour’s fastback design and is positioned as a premium offering with advanced technologies and turbocharged engine options. While the Avancier was not marketed outside China, its introduction represented Honda’s continued presence in the crossover segment formerly occupied by the Crosstour.

In North America, to compete in the mid-size two row segment left vacant by the Crosstour's discontinuation, the Honda Passport would be introduced for the 2019 model year. The Passport is powered only by the 3.5-liter V6 engine, with a choice of either front-wheel or all-wheel drive.

== Safety ==
The 2013 Crosstour was available with a Forward Collision and Lane Departure Warning Systems. A rear-view backup camera was standard on all 2012 models, a more sophisticated rear camera with wide and top view angles was optional. Excluding the base EX trim a new LaneWatch camera mounted in the passenger side mirror was standard on 2013 models.

=== IIHS ===
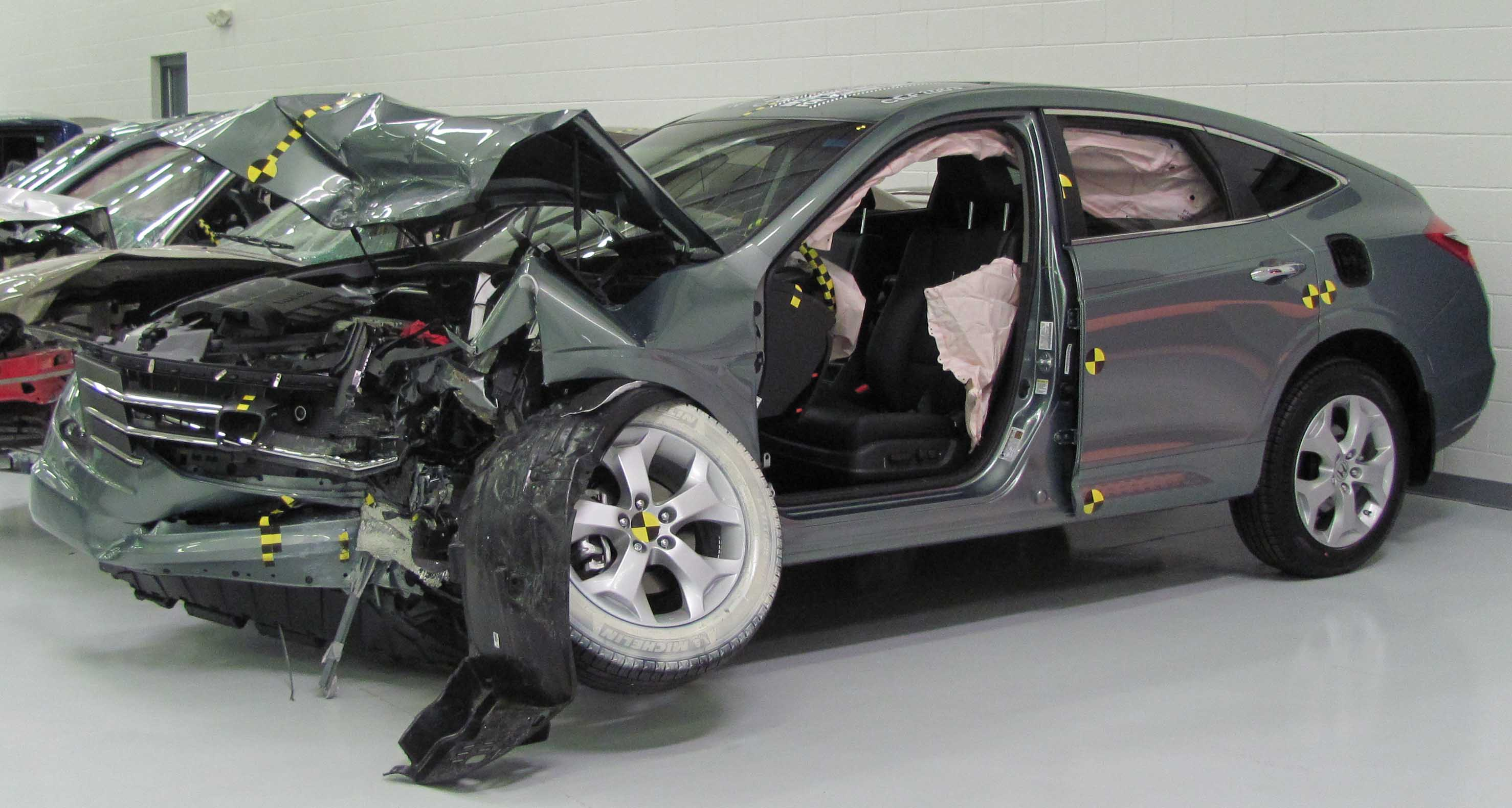
The 2010 Accord Crosstour EX-L crash-tested by the Insurance Institute for Highway Safety (IIHS)

IIHS scores:
Moderate overlap frontal offset	Good
Side impact	Good
Roof strength	Marginal (2010-12 models)
Roof strength	Good (2013–2015)

=== NHTSA ===
NHTSA 2010 Crosstour:
Frontal Driver:	5/5 stars
Frontal Passenger:	5/5 stars
Side Driver:	5/5 stars
Side Passenger:	5/5 stars
Side Rear Passenger:	5/5 stars
Rollover FWD:	/ 12.7%
Rollover AWD:	/ 11.8%

== Reception ==
The Truth About Cars noted that the initial photos of the Honda Accord Crosstour posted on Facebook received a universally-negative reception with many describing it as "ugly", to which Honda responded with a “Message to Fans” claiming that "the two studio photos we posted didn’t give you enough detail, nor were they the best to showcase the vehicle" and that their "research suggests that the styling does test well among people shopping for a crossover". Numerous publications and online polls criticized the look of the Honda Accord Crosstour, as Honda's attempt to make the Crosstour sleek (i.e. a stretched version of the Accord coupe to accommodate a set of rear doors) resulted in an "abnormally long hood and awkwardly short back end, not quite a coupe or a wagon" with a "ungainly rear overhang" that looked unattractive from a rear 3/4 angle, while the front grille was derisively compared to an alligator.

Some supporters suggested that the Crosstour was an inspiration for fastback (sloped backside) sedans such as the tenth-generation Honda Civic and Audi A7, although the latter two had better proportions all across. Others noted that other contemporary Coupe-styled crossovers that are sleek rather than boxy, such as the BMW X6, BMW 5 Series GT, and Acura ZDX, which have also been criticized for their looks while offering practicality, are luxury vehicles that are much more expensive than the Crosstour (the BMW 5 Series GT and Acura ZDX were also not well-received in North America).

The Honda Accord Crosstour had numerous positive attributes due to being based upon the critically-acclaimed Accord sedan and coupe, while having almost double the storage space of the sedan thanks to its hatchback design. The Crosstour's passenger room was largely identical to that of the spacious Accord sedan. However the Crosstour's sleek profile didn't make its cargo space as practical as more traditional boxy crossover SUVs and wagons, such as the Toyota Venza and Subaru Outback, which were based on the Toyota Camry and Subaru Legacy, respectively. Honda's decision to initially offer the Crosstour in one trim, an EX-L V6 with the only options being all-wheel drive and navigation system, gave it a considerable higher price of entry than the competing Venza and Outback which offered numerous trims across a wide price range including a base four cylinder engine. As a result the Venza and Outback have had much more sales success than the Crosstour in the mid-size two row crossover segment.

=== Sales figures ===
Calendar year	Total sales (U.S.)
2009	2,564
2010	28,851
2011	17,974
2012	20,848
2013	16,847
2014	11,802
2015	9,104
2016	726
2017	5
