= Honda J engine =

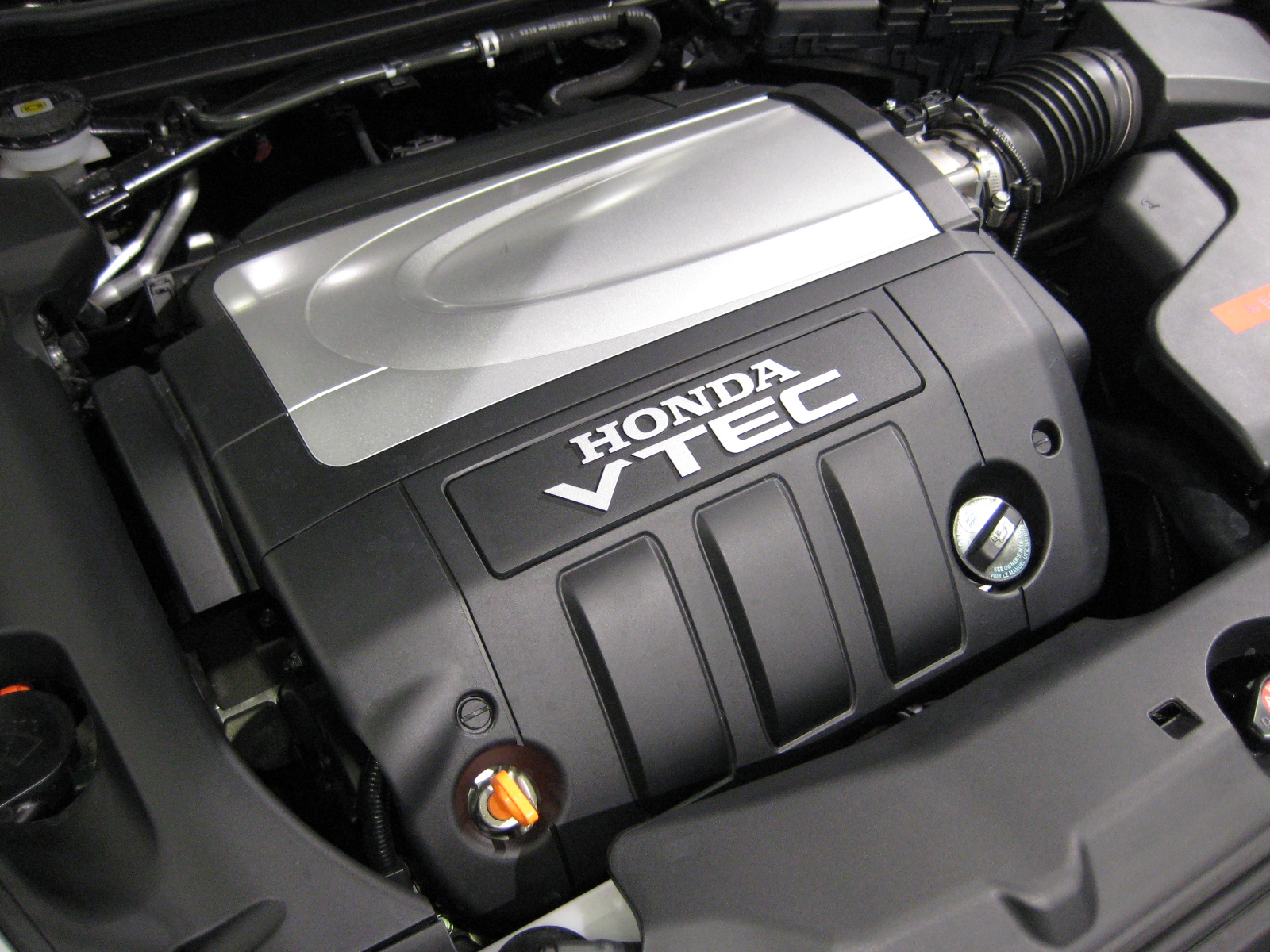

Overview
- Manufacturer: Honda Motor Manufacturing
- Production: 1996–present

Layout
- Configuration: 60° V6
- Displacement: 2.5 L (2,495 cc; 152.3 cu in); 3.0 L (2,997 cc; 182.9 cu in); 3.2 L (3,210 cc; 195.9 cu in); 3.5 L (3,471 cc; 211.8 cu in); 3.7 L (3,664 cc; 223.6 cu in)
- Cylinder bore: 86 mm (3.39 in); 89 mm (3.5 in); 90 mm (3.54 in)
- Piston stroke: 71.6 mm (2.82 in); 86 mm (3.39 in); 93 mm (3.66 in); 96 mm (3.78 in)
- Cylinder block material: Aluminum
- Cylinder head material: Aluminum
- Valvetrain: SOHC 4-valve with VTEC; DOHC 4-valve (J30AC and J35Y8)
- Compression ratio: 9.8:1, 10.0:1, 10.5:1, 11.0:1, 11.2:1, 11.5:1

RPM range
- Max. engine speed: 6,900

Combustion
- Turbocharger: Twin-scroll (J30AC)
- Fuel system: PGM-FI; Multi-point fuel injection; Direct injection
- Management: VCM; IMRC
- Fuel type: Gasoline
- Cooling system: Water-cooled

Output
- Power output: 200–355 hp (149–265 kW)
- Torque output: 177–354 lb⋅ft (240–480 N⋅m)

Dimensions
- Dry weight: 250–360 lb (110–160 kg)

Emissions
- Emissions control systems: Catalytic converter (some versions)

Chronology
- Predecessor: Honda C engine

The J-series is Honda's fourth production V6 engine family introduced in 1996, after the C-series, which consisted of three dissimilar versions. The J-series engine was designed in Japan, with engineering taking place in the United States. It is built at Honda's Anna, Ohio, and Lincoln, Alabama, engine plants.

The J-series is a 60° V6 unlike Honda's existing 90° C-series engines. Also unlike the C series, the J-series was designed strictly for transverse mounting. To keep the engine light and small, it features a tighter bore spacing (98 mm (3.86 in)), shorter connecting rods and a specialized smaller crankshaft. All J-series engines are gasoline-powered, use four valves per cylinder, and have a single timing belt that drives the overhead camshafts. VTEC variable valve timing is used on almost all applications, with exceptions being the J30AC and J35Y8 (which use Variable Timing Control [VTC] instead).

One unique feature of some J-family engine models is Honda's Variable Cylinder Management (VCM) system. Initially, the system turns off one bank of cylinders under light loads, turning the V6 into a straight-3. Some versions were able to turn off one bank of cylinders or one cylinder on opposing banks, allowing for three-cylinder use under light loads and four-cylinder use under medium loads.

== J25 ==
The J25A was used only in the Japanese domestic Inspire/Saber models. The J25A displaced 2.5 L (2,495 cc; 152.3 cu in). Its bore and stroke was 86 mm × 71.6 mm (3.39 in × 2.82 in). The J25A used a 10.5:1 compression ratio and was a SOHC VTEC design. Output was 200 hp (149 kW) at 6200 rpm and 24.5 kg⋅m (240 N⋅m; 177 lb⋅ft) of torque at 4600 rpm. It had a variable intake manifold to optimize torque output across varying engine speeds and engine response.

=== J25A ===
- 1998–2003 Honda Inspire
- 1999 Honda Saber

== J30 ==
The J30A displaces 3.0 L (2,997 cc; 182.9 cu in) and is a SOHC VTEC design. Its bore and stroke is 86 mm × 86 mm (3.39 in × 3.39 in). Output for the J30A1 was initially 200 hp (149 kW) and 195 lb⋅ft (264 N⋅m) of torque, later increased to 210 hp (157 kW) and 200 lb⋅ft (271 N⋅m) of torque. The J30A4 pushed output to 242 hp (180 kW) and 212 lb⋅ft (287 N⋅m) using a three-way VTEC system, a higher (10.0:1) compression ratio and a novel exhaust manifold cast as one piece with the cylinder head. It weighs nearly 20 lb (9.1 kg) less and is an inch shorter than J30A1. This version was on the Ward's 10 Best Engines list for 2003 and 2004. The IMA hybrid version was on the list for 2005. In 2006 Honda created the J30A5 to mark the 30th anniversary of the Accord. It boosted output to 244 hp (182 kW) (SAE Net 08/04) and 211 lb⋅ft (286 N⋅m) (SAE Net 08/04) of torque. According to Honda, horsepower gains were achieved with improvements to the airflow of the intake and exhaust system.

=== J30A – VCM ===
- 2003–2007 Honda Inspire (JDM, marked as J30A-60 250ps)
- 2004–2013 Honda Elysion (JDM, RR3/RR4)
- Displacement: 3.0 L (2,997 cc; 182.9 cu in)
- Bore and stroke: 86 mm × 86 mm (3.39 in × 3.39 in)
- Power: 247 hp (184 kW) at 6,000 rpm
- Torque: 296 N⋅m (218 lb⋅ft) at 5,000 rpm
- IMRC (Intake Manifold Resonance Control) for increased torque at low rpm
- Redline: 6,800 rpm
- Compression: 10.5:1
- Valve train : SOHC i-VTEC (belt-driven, intake2, exhaust2)
- Variable Cylinder Management (VCM) : (3 and 6 cylinder operation)
- Induction: Naturally Aspirated
- Fuel Delivery:Multi-point fuel injection (Honda PGM-FI)
- Emissions control systems : Catalytic converter, EGR, PCV
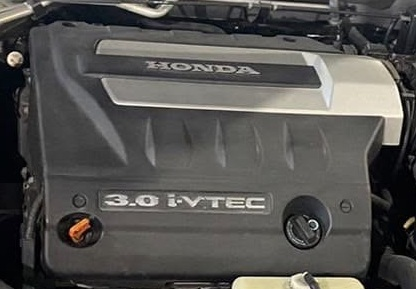
  J30A - Honda Inspire
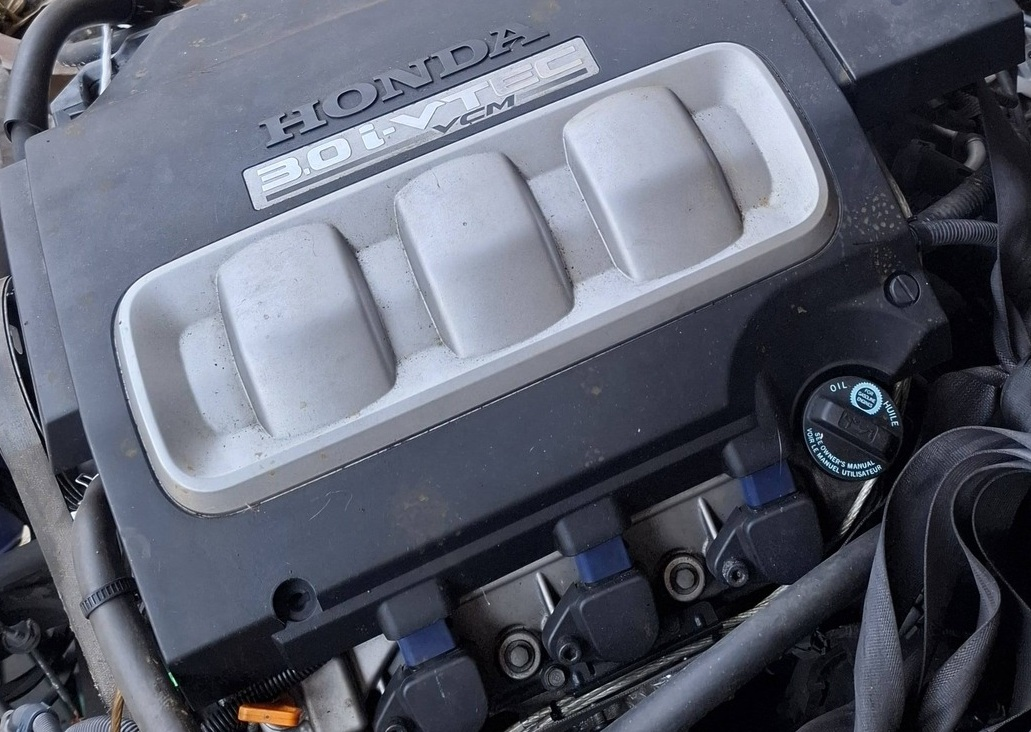
  J30A i-vtec VCM on Honda Elysion

=== J30A1 ===
- 1996–1999 Acura 3.0CL
- 1998–2002 Honda Accord V6

=== J30A3 ===
- 1998–2002 Honda Accord V6
- 1998–2003 Honda Odyssey (Prestige & Absolute models)

=== J30A4 ===
- 2003–2005 Honda Accord V6 (USDM)
- Displacement: 3.0 L (2,997 cc; 182.9 cu in)
- Bore and stroke: 86 mm × 86 mm (3.39 in × 3.39 in)
- Power: 242 hp (180 kW) at 6,250 rpm (Thai Domestic Market 220 hp): Drive by wire for reducing gas emissions)
- Torque: 288 N⋅m (212 lb⋅ft) at 5,000 rpm
- Compression: 10.0:1
- Induction: Naturally Aspirated
- Fuel Delivery: Multi-point fuel injection (PGM-FI)
- Valve Train: 24-Valve SOHC VTEC

=== J30A5 ===
- 2006–2007 Honda Accord V6
- 2013–2016 Honda Accord (China only, with VCM ,261ps)
- Displacement: 3.0 L (2,997 cc; 182.9 cu in)
- Bore and stroke: 86 mm × 86 mm (3.39 in × 3.39 in)
- Power: 244 hp (182 kW) at 6,250 rpm
- Torque: 211 lb⋅ft (286 N⋅m) at 5000 rpm
- Redline: 6,800 rpm
- Fuel cut: 7,000rpm
- Compression: 10.0:1
- Valve Train: 24-Valve SOHC VTEC

=== J30AC ===
(Turbo)

- 2021–2025 Acura TLX Type-S
- 2022+ Acura MDX Type-S
- Displacement: 3.0 L (2,997 cc; 182.9 cu in)
- Bore and stroke: 86 mm × 86 mm (3.39 in × 3.39 in)
- Power: 355 hp (265 kW) at 5500 rpm
- Torque: 354 lb⋅ft (480 N⋅m) at 1400–5000 rpm
- Compression: 9.8:1
- Valve Train: 24-Valve DOHC with VTC

=== J30Y1 ===
- 2013–2018 Acura RDX (China)
- 2017–2020 Acura MDX (Sport Hybrid)
- Displacement: 3.0 L (2,997 cc; 182.9 cu in)
- Bore and stroke: 86 mm × 86 mm (3.39 in × 3.39 in)
- Power (engine only): 257 hp at 6300 rpm
- Power (combined): 321 hp at 6300 rpm
- Torque (combined): 289 lb⋅ft (392 N⋅m) at 5000 rpm
- Valve train: 24-Valve SOHC
- Induction/Fuel Delivery: Naturally Aspirated – Direct Injection

=== JNA1 ===
- 2005–2007 Honda Accord Hybrid
- Displacement: 3.0 L (2,997 cc; 182.9 cu in)
- Bore and stroke: 86 mm × 86 mm (3.39 in × 3.39 in)
- Power: 240 hp (180 kW) at 5400 rpm + IMA hybrid 15 hp (11 kW) = 255 hp (190 kW)
- Torque: 232 lb⋅ft (315 N⋅m) at 4500 rpm
- Compression: 10.5:1
- Valve Train: 24-Valve SOHC i-VTEC

== J32 ==
The J32A displaces 3.2 L (3,210 cc; 195.9 cu in) and is a SOHC VTEC design. Its bore and stroke is 89 mm × 86 mm (3.50 in × 3.39 in). Output was 225 hp (168 kW) at 5600 rpm and 217 lb⋅ft (294 N⋅m) at 4700 rpm for the J32A1, with the J32A2 raising output to 260 hp (194 kW) at 6200 rpm and 232 lb⋅ft (315 N⋅m) at 3500–5500 rpm. A more aggressive camshaft, more free flowing intake/exhaust, and a 2-stage intake manifold produced a 33.55 hp (25.02 kW) increase over the J32A1. The J32A3's output in the 2004/2005 TL is 270 hp (201 kW). Due to changes in SAE testing methods, 2006–2008 model years have a reduced output rating of 258 hp (192 kW), despite being mechanically identical. The J32A3 includes a one-piece exhaust manifold cast with the cylinder head, first introduced on the J30A4.

=== J32A1 ===
- 1999–2003 Acura TL
- 2001–2003 Acura CL
- 1998–2003 Honda Inspire

=== J32A2 ===
- 2001–2003 Acura CL Type-S
- Bore and Stroke: 89mm x 86mm
- 10.5:1 Compression
- 260 bhp (194 kW) at 6100 rpm and 232 lb⋅ft (315 N⋅m) of torque at 3500-5500 rpm
- 2002–2003 Acura TL Type-S
- 2002–2003 Honda Inspire Type-S

=== J32A3 ===
- 2004–2008 Acura TL
- 3.2-liter SOHC V-6 aluminum alloy engine
- Bore Stroke (All J32's) : 89mm x 86mm (3.5in x 3.386 in)
- 11:1 Compression (High Compression Piston Domes)
- (2004–2005) 270 hp (201 kW) at 6200 rpm and 238 lb⋅ft (323 N⋅m) of torque at 5000 rpm
- (2006–2008) Readout changed to SAE standards, Revised to 258 hp (192 kW)at 6200 rpm and 238 lb⋅ft (323 N⋅m) of torque at 5000 rpm - *No change was made to engine, only SAE readout which changed the HP numbers
- 2007–2008 (With revised bellhousing) Acura TL
- Variable Valve Timing and Lift Electronic Control (VTEC)
- Dual-stage induction system
- Cold-air intake system
- Computer-controlled Programmed Fuel Injection (PGM-FI)
- Direct ignition system
- Unique exhaust manifolds that are cast directly into the head
- High flow close-coupled catalytic converters
- VTEC engagement: 4,700 rpm

== J35 ==
=== J35A ===
The J35A is a SOHC VTEC design. Its weight is 360 lb (163 kg) running. The Honda Marine BF200-series marine engine shares its internals with the J35A.

==== J35A1 ====
- 1999–2001 Honda Odyssey
- Displacement: 3.5 L (3,471 cc; 211.8 cu in)
- Bore and stroke: 89 mm × 93 mm (3.50 in × 3.66 in)
- Power: Premium – 210 hp (157 kW) Regular -205 hp (153 kW)
- Torque: Premium – 229 lb⋅ft (310 N⋅m) Regular – 217 lb⋅ft (294 N⋅m)
- Fuel Delivery: Programmed Fuel Injection (PGM-FI)

==== J35A3 ====
- 2001–2002 Acura MDX
- Displacement: 3.5 L (3,471 cc; 211.8 cu in)
- Bore and stroke: 89 mm × 93 mm (3.50 in × 3.66 in)
- Power: 240 hp (179 kW) at 5800 rpm
- Torque: 242 lb⋅ft (328 N⋅m) at 4500 rpm
- Fuel Delivery: Programmed Fuel Injection (PGM-FI)

==== J35A4 ====
- 2002–2004 Honda Odyssey
- 2003–2004 Honda Pilot
- Displacement: 3.5 L (3,471 cc; 211.8 cu in)
- Bore and stroke: 89 mm × 93 mm (3.50 in × 3.66 in)
- Power: 240 hp (179 kW) at 5400 rpm
- Torque: 242 lb⋅ft (328 N⋅m) at 4500 rpm
- Compression: 10.0:1
- Fuel Delivery: Programmed Fuel Injection (PGM-FI)
- Valve Train: 24-valve SOHC VTEC

==== J35A5 ====
- 2003–2006 Acura MDX
- Displacement: 3.5 L (3,471 cc; 211.8 cu in)
- Bore and stroke: 89 mm × 93 mm (3.50 in × 3.66 in)
- Power: 265 hp (198 kW) at 5800 rpm
- Torque: 250 lb⋅ft (339 N⋅m) at 3500 rpm
- Compression: 10.0:1
- Fuel Delivery: Programmed Fuel Injection (PGM-FI)
- Valve Train: 24-valve SOHC VTEC

==== J35A6 ====
- 2005–2006 Honda Odyssey (LX, EX)
- 2007–2010 Honda Odyssey (LX, EX) (with revised bellhousing)
- 2005 Honda Pilot
- Displacement: 3.5 L (3,471 cc; 211.8 cu in)
- Bore and stroke: 89 mm × 93 mm (3.50 in × 3.66 in)
- Power: 255 hp (190 kW) at 5600 rpm
- Torque: 250 lb⋅ft (339 N⋅m) at 4500 rpm
- Compression: 10.0:1
- Fuel Delivery: Programmed Fuel Injection (PGM-FI)
- Valve Train: 24-valve SOHC VTEC
- VTEC engagement: 4,600 rpm

==== J35A7 – VCM ====
Variable Cylinder Management (VCM) Piston Oil Jets

- 2005–2006 Honda Odyssey (EX-L, Touring)
- 2007–2010 Honda Odyssey (EX-L, Touring) (with revised bellhousing)
- Displacement: 3.5 L (3,471 cc; 211.8 cu in)
- Bore and stroke: 89 mm × 93 mm (3.50 in × 3.66 in)
- Power: 255 hp (190 kW) at 5600 rpm
- Torque: 250 lb⋅ft (339 N⋅m) at 4500 rpm
- Compression: 10.5:1
- Fuel Delivery: Programmed Fuel Injection (PGM-FI)
- Valve Train: 24-valve SOHC i-VTEC*
- VCM (Gen 1): 3 or 6 cylinder mode (2005–2007 Honda Odyssey (EX-L, Touring))
- VCM (Gen 2): 3, 4 or 6 cylinder mode (2008–2010 Honda Odyssey (EX-L, Touring))
- VTEC engagement: 4,600 rpm

*Note, Honda's 4-cylinder i-VTEC technology uniquely employs VTEC + Variable Timing Control (VTC). Honda's V6 i-VTEC engines uniquely employs VTEC + Variable Cylinder Management (VCM).

==== J35A8 ====
- 2004–2008 Honda Legend KB1 (designation as "J35A" on block)
- 2005–2008 Acura RL
- 2007–2008 Acura TL Type-S
- Displacement: 3.5 L (3,471 cc; 211.8 cu in)
- Bore and stroke: 89 mm × 93 mm (3.50 in × 3.66 in)
- Power: 286 hp (213 kW) at 6200 rpm
- Torque: 256 lb⋅ft (347 N⋅m) at 5000 rpm
- Power: Acura RL: 290 hp at 6,200 rpm
- Torque: Acura RL: 260 lb.-ft. at 5,000 rpm
- Compression: 11.0:1
- Fuel Delivery: Programmed Fuel Injection (PGM-FI)
- Valve Train: 24-valve SOHC VTEC
- VTEC engagement: 4,950 rpm
- On the Ward's 10 Best Engines list for 2005

==== J35A9 ====
- 2006–2008 Honda Ridgeline
- 2006–2008 Honda Pilot (4WD models)
- Displacement: 3.5 L (3,471 cc; 211.8 cu in)
- Bore and stroke: 89 mm × 93 mm (3.50 in × 3.66 in)
- Power: 247 hp (184 kW) at 5750 rpm
- Torque: 245 lb⋅ft (332 N⋅m) at 4500 rpm
- Compression: 10.0:1
- Fuel Delivery: Programmed Fuel Injection (PGM-FI)
- VTEC engagement: 4,400 rpm

=== J35S ===
==== J35S1 ====
- 2004–2007 Saturn Vue also referred to as GM L66
- Displacement: 3.5 L (3,471 cc; 211.8 cu in)
- Bore and stroke: 89 mm × 93 mm (3.50 in × 3.66 in)
- Power: 248 hp (185 kW) at 5800 rpm
- Torque: 242 lb⋅ft (328 N⋅m) at 4500 rpm
- Fuel Delivery: Programmed Fuel Injection (PGM-FI)
- Has revised bell housing Honda round style along with revised cylinder heads with single exit port
- Renamed J35A5 from the 2003–2006 Acura MDX with different cam profiles; uses the h5 awd/fwd automatic transmission (and transfer case if applicable) along with the same wire harness and ECU

=== J35Z ===
The J35Z engines use a die-cast aluminum block with cast-iron cylinder sleeves.

==== J35Z1 – VCM ====
- 2006–2008 Honda Pilot (front-wheel drive only)
- Displacement: 3.5 L (3,471 cc; 211.8 cu in)
- Bore and stroke: 89 mm × 93 mm (3.50 in × 3.66 in)
- Compression: 10.5:1
- Power: 244 hp (182 kW) at 5,750 rpm
- Torque: 240 lb⋅ft (325 N⋅m) at 4,500 rpm
- Fuel Delivery: Programmed Fuel Injection (PGM-FI)
- Valve Train: 24-valve SOHC i-VTEC
- VCM (Gen 1): 3 or 6 cylinder mode

==== J35Z2 – VCM ====
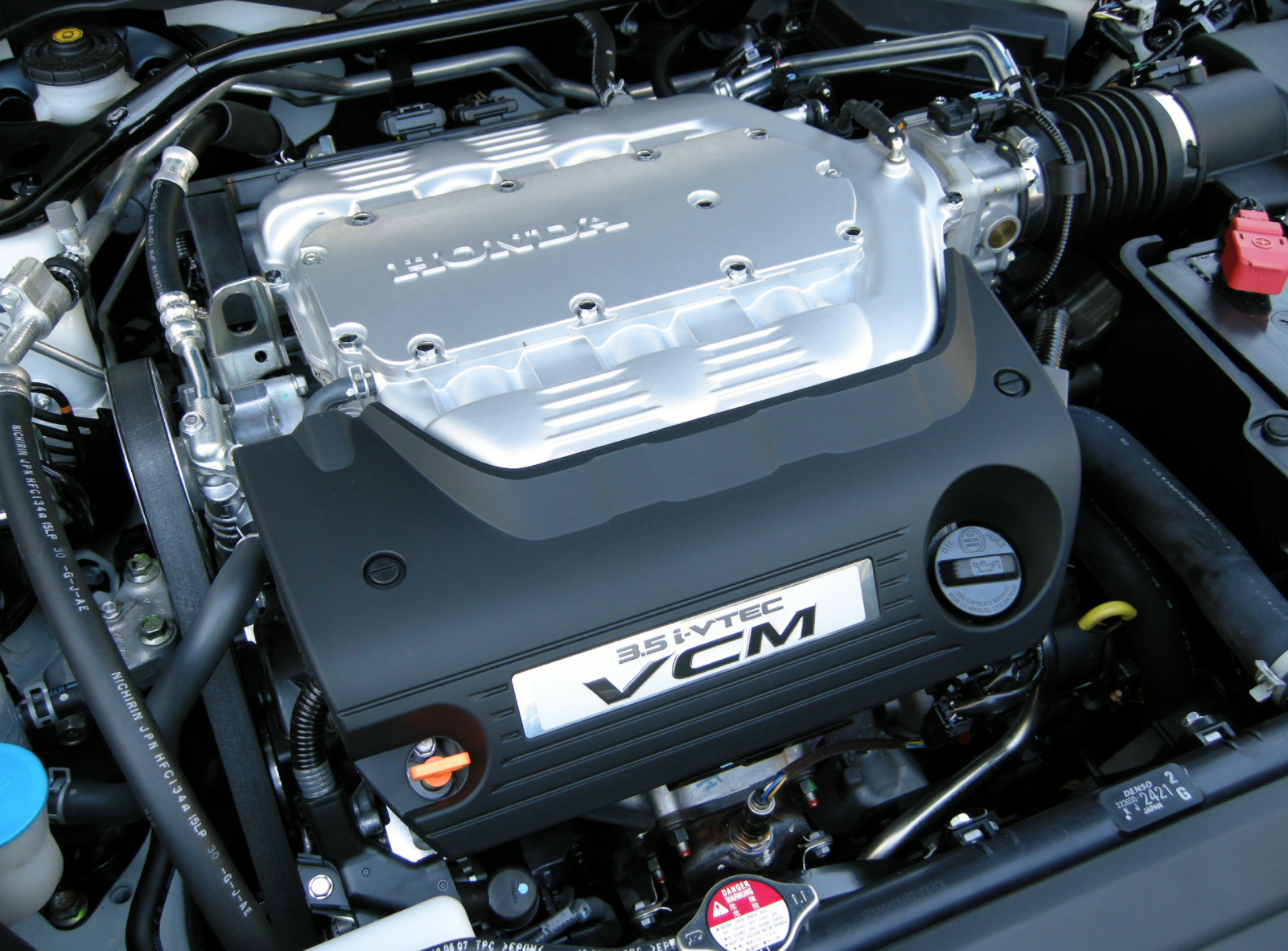
J35Z2

- 2008–2012 Honda Accord V6 (5AT)
- 2010–2012 Honda Accord Crosstour
- 2013–2018 Acura RDX
- 2007–2012 Honda Inspire (Japanese market, marked as J35A-80 280ps)
- Displacement: 3.5 L; 211.8 cu in (3,471 cc)
- Bore and stroke: 89 mm × 93 mm (3.50 in × 3.66 in)
- Compression: 10.5:1
- Power: 268 hp (200 kW) at 6,200 rpm (2008–2012 Honda Accord V6 (5AT)
- Power: 271 hp (202 kW) at 6,200 rpm (2010–2012 Honda Accord Crosstour)
- Power: 273 hp (204 kW) at 6,200 rpm (2013–2015 Acura RDX)
- Power: 279 hp (208 kW) at 6,200 rpm) (2016–2018 Acura RDX)
- Torque: 248 lb⋅ft (336 N⋅m) at 5,000 rpm (2008–2012 Honda Accord V6 (5AT)
- Torque: 254 lb⋅ft (344 N⋅m) at 5,000 rpm (2010–2012 Honda Accord Crosstour)
- Torque: 251 lb⋅ft (340 N⋅m) at 5,100 rpm) (2013–2015 Acura RDX)
- Torque: 252 lb⋅ft (342 N⋅m) at 4,900 rpm) (2016–2018 Acura RDX)
- Fuel Delivery: Programmed Fuel Injection (PGM-FI)
- Valve Train: 24-valve SOHC i-VTEC
- VCM (Gen 2): 3, 4 or 6 cylinder mode
- VCM (Gen 3): 3 or 6 cylinder mode (only 2016–2018 Acura RDX)
- Redline: 6,900 rpm

==== J35Z3 ====
- 2008–2012 Honda Accord V6 (6MT)
- Displacement: 3.5 L; 211.8 cu in (3,471 cc)
- Bore and stroke: 89 mm × 93 mm (3.50 in × 3.66 in)
- Compression: 10.5:1
- Power: 268 hp (200 kW) at 6,200 rpm
- Torque: 254 lb⋅ft (344 N⋅m) at 5,000 rpm
- Fuel Delivery: Programmed Fuel Injection (PGM-FI)
- Valve Train: 24-valve SOHC VTEC
- VTEC engagement: 5,000 rpm

==== J35Z4 – VCM ====
- 2009–2015 Honda Pilot
- Displacement: 3.5 L; 211.8 cu in (3,471 cc)
- Bore and stroke: 89 mm × 93 mm (3.50 in × 3.66 in)
- Compression: 10.5:1
- Power: 250 hp (186 kW) at 5,700 rpm
- Torque: 253 lb⋅ft (343 N⋅m) at 4,800 rpm
- Fuel Delivery: Programmed Fuel Injection (PGM-FI)
- Valve Train: 24-valve SOHC i-VTEC
- VCM (Gen 2): 3, 4 or 6 cylinder mode

==== J35Z5 ====
- 2009–2014 Honda Ridgeline
- Displacement: 3.5 L; 211.8 cu in (3,471 cc)
- Bore and stroke: 89 mm × 93 mm (3.50 in × 3.66 in)
- Compression: 10.0:1
- Power: 250 hp (186 kW) at 5,700 rpm
- Torque: 247 lb⋅ft (335 N⋅m) at 4,300 rpm
- Fuel Delivery: Programmed Fuel Injection (PGM-FI)
- Valve Train: 24-valve SOHC VTEC

==== J35Z6 ====
- 2010–2014 Acura TSX V6
- 2009–2014 Acura TL (non SH-AWD)
- Displacement: 3.5 L; 211.8 cu in (3,471 cc)
- Bore and stroke: 89 mm × 93 mm (3.50 in × 3.66 in)
- Compression: 11.2:1
- Power: 280 hp (209 kW) at 6,200 rpm
- Torque: 254 lb⋅ft (344 N⋅m) at 5,000 rpm
- Fuel Delivery: Programmed Fuel Injection (PGM-FI)
- Valve Train: 24-valve SOHC VTEC

==== J35Z8 – VCM ====
- 2011–2017 Honda Odyssey (North America)
- Displacement: 3.5 L (3,471 cc; 211.8 cu in)
- Bore and stroke: 89 mm × 93 mm (3.50 in × 3.66 in)
- Compression: 10.5:1
- Power: 248 hp (185 kW) at 5,700 rpm)
- Torque: 250 lb⋅ft (339 N⋅m) at 4,800 rpm
- Fuel Delivery: Programmed Fuel Injection (PGM-FI)
- Valve Train: 24-valve SOHC i-VTEC
- VCM (Gen 2): 3, 4 or 6 cylinder mode

=== J35Y ===
==== J35Y1 – VCM ====
- 2013–2017 Honda Accord V6 (6AT)
- 2013–2015 Honda Crosstour
- Displacement: 3.5 L; 211.8 cu in (3,471 cc)
- Bore and stroke: 89 mm × 93 mm (3.50 in × 3.66 in)
- Compression: 10.5:1
- Power: 278 hp (207 kW) at 6,200 rpm
- Torque: 252 lb⋅ft (342 N⋅m) at 4,900 rpm
- Fuel Delivery: Programmed Fuel Injection (PGM-FI) (Earth Dreams™ Technology)
- Valve Train: 24-valve SOHC i-VTEC (VTEC on intake valves only)
- VCM (Gen 3): 3 or 6 cylinder mode
- Redline: 6,800 rpm
- Fuel Cut off: 7,200 rpm
- VTEC engagement: 5,150 rpm

==== J35Y2 ====
- 2013–2017 Honda Accord V6 (6MT)
- Displacement: 3.5 L; 211.8 cu in (3,471 cc)
- Bore and stroke: 89 mm × 93 mm (3.50 in × 3.66 in)
- Compression: 10.0:1
- Power: 278 hp (207 kW) at 6,200 rpm
- Torque: 252 lb⋅ft (342 N⋅m) at 4,900 rpm
- Fuel Delivery: Programmed Fuel Injection (PGM-FI) (Earth Dreams™ Technology)
- Valve Train: 24-valve SOHC VTEC (VTEC on intake valves only)
- Redline: 6,800 rpm
- Fuel cutoff: 7,200 rpm
- VTEC engagement: 4,900 rpm

==== J35Y4 – VCM ====
- 2014–2020 Acura RLX / Honda Legend
- Displacement: 3.5 L; 211.8 cu in (3,471 cc)
- Bore and stroke: 89 mm × 93 mm (3.50 in × 3.66 in)
- Compression: 11.5:1
- Power: 310 hp (231 kW) at 6,500 rpm
- Torque: 272 lb⋅ft (369 N⋅m) at 4,500 rpm
- Fuel Delivery: Direct Injection (Earth Dreams™ Technology)
- Valve Train: 24-valve SOHC i-VTEC (VTEC on intake valves only)
- VCM (Gen 3): 3 or 6 cylinder mode
- Redline: 6,800 rpm
- Fuel cutoff: 7,200 rpm
- VTEC engagement: 5,000 rpm

==== J35Y5 – VCM ====
- 2014–present Acura MDX
- Displacement: 3.5 L; 211.8 cu in (3,471 cc)
- Bore and stroke: 89 mm × 93 mm (3.50 in × 3.66 in)
- Compression: 11.5:1
- Power: 290 hp (216 kW) at 6,200 rpm
- Torque: 267 lb⋅ft (362 N⋅m) at 4,500 rpm
- Fuel Delivery: Direct Injection (Earth Dreams™ Technology)
- Valve Train: 24-valve SOHC i-VTEC (VTEC on intake valves only)
- VCM (Gen 3): 3 or 6 cylinder mode
- Redline: 6,800 rpm
- Fuel cutoff: 7,200 rpm
- VTEC engagement: 4,950 rpm

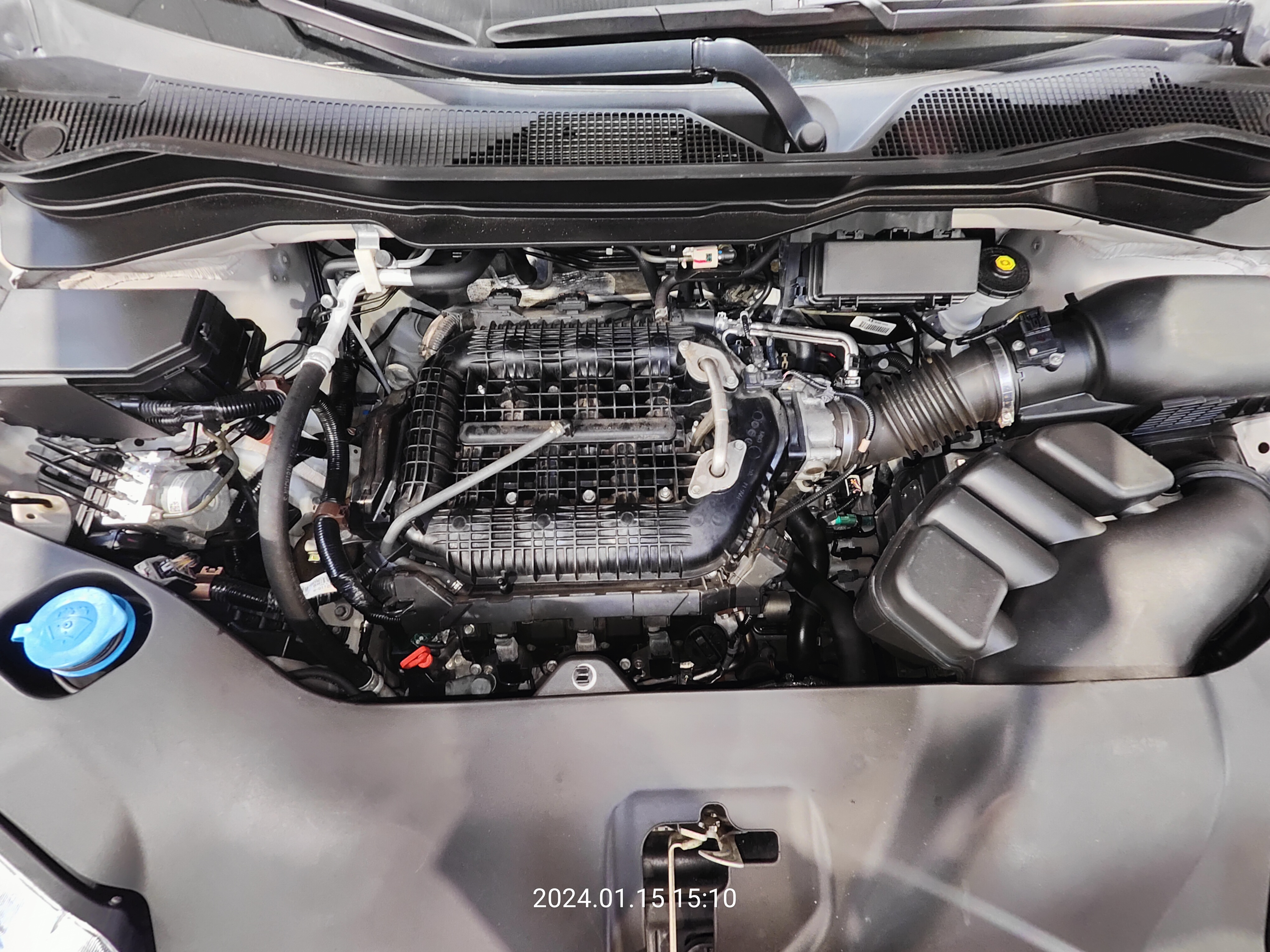
Honda Pilot J35Y6

==== J35Y6 - VCM ====
- 2015–2020 Acura TLX
- 2016–2022 Honda Pilot
- 2017–present Honda Ridgeline
- 2018–present Honda Odyssey (North America)
- 2019–2025 Honda Passport
- Displacement: 3.5 L; 211.8 cu in (3,471 cc)
- Bore and stroke: 89 mm × 93 mm (3.50 in × 3.66 in)
- Compression: 11.5:1
- Power: 290 hp (216 kW) at 6,200 rpm (2015–2020 Acura TLX)
- Power: 280 hp (209 kW) at 6,000 rpm
- Torque: 267 lb⋅ft (362 N⋅m) at 4,500 rpm (2015–2020 Acura TLX)
- Torque: 262 lb⋅ft (355 N⋅m) at 4,700 rpm
- Fuel Delivery: Direct Injection (Earth Dreams™ Technology)
- Valve Train: 24-valve SOHC i-VTEC (VTEC intake valves only)
- VCM (Gen 3): 3 or 6 cylinder mode
- Redline: 6,800 rpm
- Fuel cutoff: 7,200 rpm
- VTEC engagement: 5,000 rpm (2015–2020 Acura TLX)
- VTEC engagement: 5,350 rpm

==== J35Y8 – VCM ====
- 2023–present Honda Pilot
- 2026–present Honda Passport
- Displacement: 3.5 L; 211.8 cu in (3,471 cc)
- Bore and stroke: 89 mm × 93 mm (3.50 in × 3.66 in)
- Compression: 11.5:1
- Power: 285 hp (213 kW) at 6,100 rpm
- Torque: 262 lb⋅ft (355 N⋅m) at 5,000 rpm
- Fuel Delivery: Direct Injection (Earth Dreams™ Technology)
- Valve Train: 24-valve DOHC with VTC (Variable Timing Control)
- VCM (Gen 4): 3 or 6 cylinder mode

== J37 ==
The J37 uses a die-cast aluminum block with aluminum cylinder liners. Primarily due to the cylinder liners being made from aluminum instead of cast-iron the engine weighs less than the J35Z engines. The intake manifold is made from a cast magnesium alloy.

=== J37A1 ===
- 2007–2013 Acura MDX
- Displacement: 3.7 L; 223.6 cu in (3,664 cc)
- Bore and stroke: 90 mm × 96 mm (3.54 in × 3.78 in)
- Compression: 11.0:1 (2007–2009); 11.2:1 (2010–2013)
- Power; torque: 300 hp (224 kW) at 6,000 rpm; 275 lb⋅ft (373 N⋅m) at 5,000 rpm (2007–2009)
- Power; torque: 300 hp (224 kW) at 6,300 rpm; 270 lb⋅ft (366 N⋅m) at 4,500 rpm (2010–2013)
- Fuel Delivery: Programmed Fuel Injection (PGM-FI)
- Valve Train: 24-valve SOHC VTEC
- VTEC engagement (2007–2009): 4,500 rpm
- VTEC engagement (2010–2013): 4,800 rpm

=== J37A2 ===
- 2009–2012 Acura RL
- Displacement: 3.7 L; 223.6 cu in (3,664 cc)
- Bore and stroke: 90 mm × 96 mm (3.54 in × 3.78 in)
- Compression: 11.2:1
- Power; torque: 300 hp (224 kW) at 6,300 rpm; 271 lb⋅ft (367 N⋅m) at 5,000 rpm
- Fuel Delivery: Programmed Fuel Injection (PGM-FI)
- Valve Train: 24-valve SOHC VTEC
- VTEC engagement: 4,900 rpm

=== J37A4 ===
- 2008–2012 Honda Legend
- 2009–2014 Acura TL SH-AWD
- Displacement: 3.7 L; 223.6 cu in (3,664 cc)
- Bore and stroke: 90 mm × 96 mm (3.54 in × 3.78 in)
- Compression: 11.2:1
- Power; torque: 305 hp (227 kW) at 6,300 rpm; 273 lb⋅ft (370 N⋅m) at 5,000 rpm
- Fuel Delivery: Programmed Fuel Injection (PGM-FI)
- Valve Train: 24-valve SOHC VTEC
- VTEC engagement: 4,700 rpm

=== J37A5 ===
- 2010–2013 Acura ZDX
- Displacement: 3.7 L; 223.6 cu in (3,664 cc)
- Bore and stroke: 90 mm × 96 mm (3.5 in × 3.8 in)
- Compression: 11.2:1
- Power; torque: 300 hp (224 kW) at 6,300 rpm; 270 lb⋅ft (366 N⋅m) at 4,500 rpm
- Fuel Delivery: Programmed Fuel Injection (PGM-FI)
- Valve Train: 24-valve SOHC VTEC (VTEC intake valves only)
- VTEC engagement: 4,800 rpm

== See also ==
- List of Honda engines
- Engines used in GM Vehicles
