= Nappa =

Nappa may refer to:

== Places ==
- Nappa, Finland, a village in northern Kymenlaakso
- Nappa, North Yorkshire, a village in England
- Nappa Hall, North Yorkshire, England

== People ==
- Francisco Nappa (fl. 1928), Maltese water polo player.
- Mike Nappa (born 1963), American author

== Fictional characters ==
- Nappa (character), a character in Dragon Ball media
- Antonio Nappa, a character in TV series Oz, played by Mark Margolis

== Other uses ==
- Nappa cabbage or napa cabbage, a type of Chinese cabbage
- Nappa leather, a full-grain leather

== See also ==
- Napa (disambiguation)
