= Napa =

Napa or NAPA may refer to:

== Places ==
- Napa, California, the county seat of Napa County, California
- Napa County, California, United States
- Napa River, California
- Napa Valley AVA, an "American Viticultural Area" designated wine region
- Rancho Napa, an 1838 Mexican land grant

== Medicine ==
- NAPA (gene), N-ethylmaleimide-sensitive factor attachment protein, alpha
- N-Acetylprocainamide (acecainide), an anti-arrhythmic heart drug

== Organizations ==
- NAPA Auto Parts, an American retailers' cooperative
- National Academy of Public Administration (United States), an American national academy
- National Amateur Press Association, the earliest amateur press association, founded in 1876 and still in existence
- The Nordic Institute in Greenland (Nunani Avannarlerni Piorsarsimassutsikkut Attaveqaat)
- North Adriatic Ports Association
- National APIDA Panhellenic Association, whose common abbreviation is NAPA

== People ==
=== Surname ===
- Alex Napa (born 1976), Cook Islands footballer and manager
- Dylan Napa (born 1992), Australian rugby league player
- Ian Napa (born 1978), European bantamweight boxing champion
- Malachi Napa (born 1999), English footballer
- Selina Napa, Cook Islands politician and current Member of the Cook Islands Parliament

=== First name ===
- Napa Kiatwanchai (born 1967), Thai World Boxing Council strawweight champion

== Schools ==
- Napa High School, Napa, California
- Napa Valley College, previously named Napa Junior College and Napa Community College, a community college in Napa Valley, California
- National Academy of Performing Arts, Karachi, Pakistan

== Ships ==
- USS Napa, various ships of the United States Navy
- MV Napa, a passenger ferry operating in San Francisco Bay, California, United States

== Other ==
- Napa cabbage, a type of Chinese cabbage
- Napa leather, a leather noted for its soft feel
- Napa platform, an Intel Centrino platform for laptop computers
- Napa (band), a Portuguese indie band
- National Adaptation Programme of Action, a type of plan submitted to the United Nations Framework Convention on Climate Change by Least Developed Countries
- Native American Programs Act
- North American Phonetic Alphabet

== See also ==
- Cerro Napa, a volcano on the border between Bolivia and Chile
- Nappa (disambiguation)
