= Lamborghini Huracán =

Sports car manufactured by Lamborghini

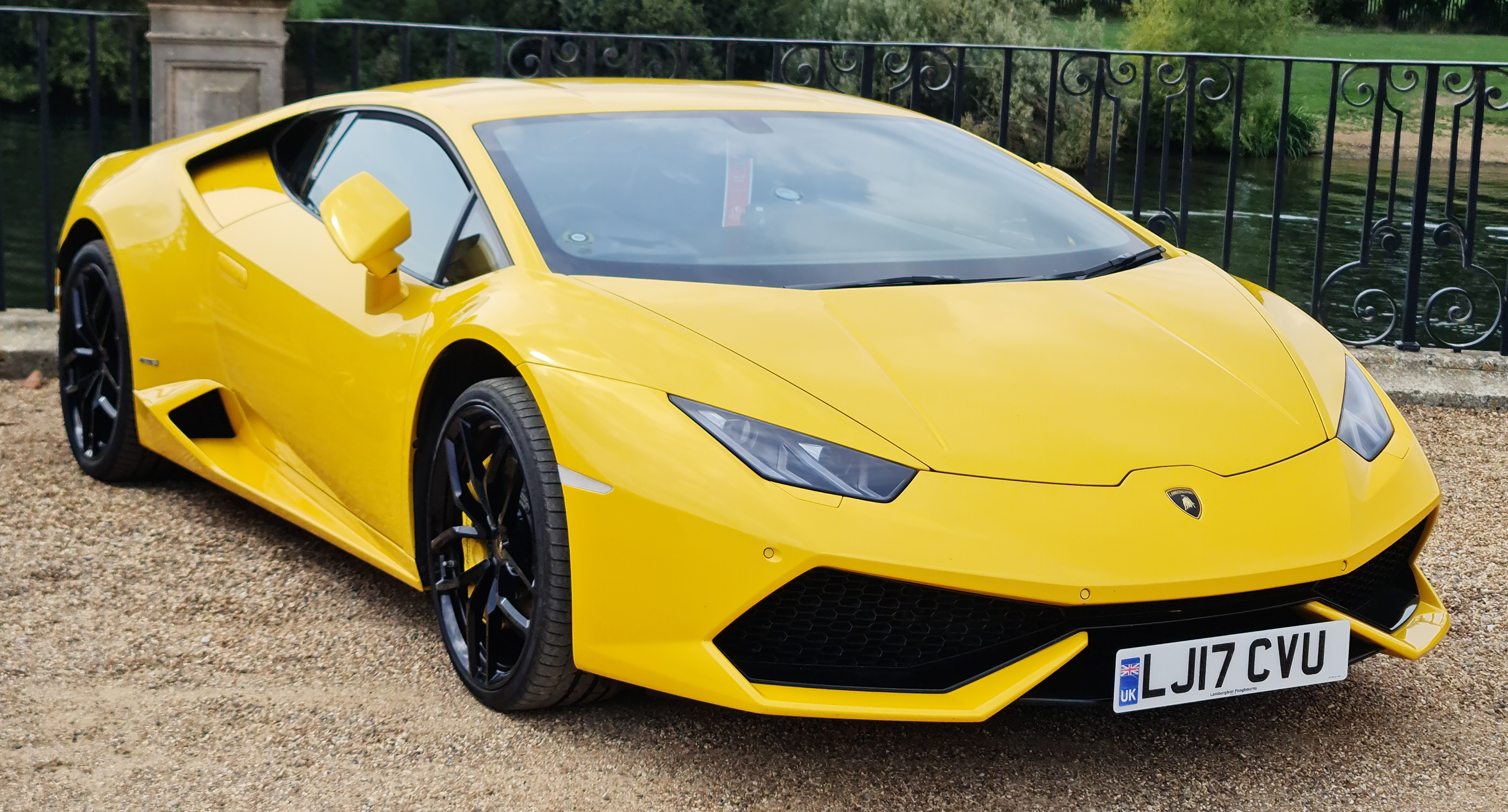

Overview
- Manufacturer: Lamborghini
- Model code: LB724
- Production: 2014–2024
- Assembly: Italy: Sant'Agata Bolognese
- Designer: Filippo Perini (original design); Mitja Borkert (LP 640-4, facelift)

Body and chassis
- Class: Sports car (S)
- Body style: 2-door coupé; 2-door convertible
- Layout: Longitudinal, mid-engine, four-wheel-drive (LP 610-4, LP 640-4 Performante, LP 640-4 Sterrato); Rear mid-engine, rear-wheel-drive (LP 580-2, LP 620-2, LP 610-2, Tecnica, STO)
- Platform: Volkswagen Group Modular Sports System Platform
- Related: Audi R8 (Type 4S); Italdesign Zerouno; Ares Design Project1; Rezvani Dune

Powertrain
- Engine: DFJ (2014–2018)/DGF (2019–2024) 5.2 L odd-firing V10
- Transmission: 7-speed dual-clutch

Dimensions
- Wheelbase: 2,620 mm (103.1 in)
- Length: 4,459 mm (175.6 in) (pre-facelift); 4,520–4,567 mm (178.0–179.8 in) (facelift)
- Width: 1,924 mm (75.7 in) (pre-facelift); 1,933–1,956 mm (76.1–77.0 in) (facelift)
- Height: 1,165–1,248 mm (45.9–49.1 in)
- Kerb weight: 1,339–1,542 kg (2,952–3,400 lb) (without fluids); 1,553 kg (3,423 lb) (with fluids)

Chronology
- Predecessor: Lamborghini Gallardo
- Successor: Lamborghini Temerario

The Lamborghini Huracán (Spanish for "hurricane"; [uɾaˈkan]) is a mid-engine, two-seater sports car made by Lamborghini from 2014 to 2024. Revealed online in December 2013, the Huracán made its worldwide debut at the 2014 Geneva Auto Show and was released to the market in the second quarter of 2014, replacing the Gallardo. The Huracán was succeeded by the Temerario, announced in 2024.

== Name ==
Logo

The Huracán's name (huracán being the Spanish word for hurricane) is inspired by a Spanish fighting bull. Historic Spanish fighting bulls have traditionally provided the names of most Lamborghini car models. Huracán was a bull known for its courage that fought in 1879.

== Specifications and performance ==
=== Specifications ===
==== Engine ====
The Huracán retains the 5.2-litre naturally aspirated Audi/Lamborghini V10 engine of the facelifted Gallardo, tuned to generate a maximum power output of 449 kW (602 hp; 610 PS). To ensure its balance and performance, the car is mid-engined. The engine has both direct fuel injection and multi-point fuel injection. It combines the benefits of both systems; it is the first time this combination has been used in a V10 engine. The firing order of the engine is 1, 6, 5, 10, 2, 7, 3, 8, 4, 9. This is printed on a metal plate on the top of the engine, as with all other Lamborghini models.

The drag coefficient of Cd=0.39 was undisclosed until 2021.

==== Performance ====
With a kerb weight of 1,553 kg (3,424 lb), the Huracán LP 610-4 has a power-to-weight ratio of 2.55 kg (5.62 lb) per horsepower.

===== Road test measurements of LP 610-4 =====
- 0–97 km/h (60 mph): 2.5 seconds
- 0–300 km/h (186 mph): 27.6 seconds
- 0–1/4 mile: 10.4 seconds at 217 km/h (135 mph)
- 0–1 km (0.62 mi): 19.1 seconds at 272.80 km/h (170 mph)
- Maximum speed: 325 km/h (202 mph)

===== Technical information =====
Models	LP 610-4 Coupé 2014–2019	LP 610-4 Spyder 2016–2019	LP 580-2 Coupé 2016–2019	LP 580-2 Spyder 2016–2019	LP 640-4 Performante 2017–2019	LP 640-4 Performante Spyder 2018–2019	LP 640-4 EVO 2019–2024	LP 640-4 EVO Spyder 2019–2024	LP 610-2 EVO RWD 2020–2024	LP 610-2 EVO RWD Spyder 2020–2024	LP 640-2 STO 2021–2024	LP 640-2 Tecnica 2022–2024	LP 610-4 Sterrato 2023–2024
5,204 cc (5.2 L; 317.6 cu in) naturally aspirated, direct injection, DOHC, four-valve 90° V10
Power (at rpm)	449 kW (602 hp; 610 PS) at 8,250 rpm		427 kW (572 hp; 580 PS) at 8,000 rpm		471 kW (631 hp; 640 PS) at 8,000 rpm				449 kW (602 hp; 610 PS) at 8,000 rpm		471 kW (631 hp; 640 PS) at 8,000 rpm		449 kW (602 hp; 610 PS) at 8,000 rpm
Torque (at rpm)	560 N⋅m (413 lb⋅ft) at 6,500 rpm		540 N⋅m (398 lb⋅ft) at 6,500 rpm		600 N⋅m (443 lb⋅ft) at 6,500 rpm				560 N⋅m (413 lb⋅ft) at 6,500 rpm		565 N⋅m (417 lb⋅ft) at 6,500 rpm		
Performance
Power to weight ratio (without fluids)	2.36 kg (5.20 lb) / hp	-	-	-	2.2 kg (4.85 lb) / hp	2.39 kg (5.27 lb) / hp	2.25 kg (4.96 lb) / hp	2.44 kg (5.38 lb) / hp	2.31 kg (5.09 lb) / hp	2.51 kg (5.53 lb) / hp	2.09 kg (4.61 lb) / hp	2.15 kg (4.74 lb) / hp	2.44 kg (5.38 lb) / hp
0–100 km/h (0–62 mph) (seconds)	3.1	3.3	3.4	3.6	2.9	3.1	2.9	3.1	3.3	3.5	3.0	3.2	3.4
0–200 km/h (0–124 mph) (seconds)	8.8	10.2	10.1	10.4	8.9	9.3	9.0	9.3		9.6	9.0	9.1	9.8
Top speed	325 km/h (202 mph)	324 km/h (201 mph)	320 km/h (200 mph)		325 km/h (202 mph)			325 km/h (202 mph)		324 km/h (201 mph)	311 km/h (193 mph)	325 km/h (202 mph)	260 km/h (162 mph)
Quarter Mile	10.3 seconds at 220 km/h (137 mph)	-	11.7 seconds at 201 km/h (124.9 mph) (R&T)	-	10.2 seconds at 219 km/h (136 mph) (C&D)	-	-	-	-	-	-	-	-
Braking 100 km/h (62 mph)-0	31.9 metres 43.9m (R&T)	32.2 metres	31.9m		31 metres	31.5 metres	31.9 metres	32.2 metres	31.9 metres	32.2 metres	30 metres	31.5 metres	39 metres
CO_{2} emissions	280g/km	285g/km	283g/km		314g/km	320g/km	332g/km	338g/km	330g/km	335g/km	331g/km	328g/km	337g/km

The Huracán has an electronically controlled all-wheel drive system, which aims to increase the traction on various surfaces and the overall performance of the car. The car has a 7-speed dual clutch transmission, Lamborghini's new 'Doppia Frizione' (Dual Clutch) gearbox. The transmission performs differently depending on the mode the driver has selected. The different drive modes available are Sport, Strada and Corsa, Corsa being the highest performance mode. The Huracán will only be available with an automatic transmission; a manual will not be offered.

The Huracán also has a magnetically controlled suspension system. It utilises magnetorheological dampers to very quickly change how the suspension acts, ensuring performance as well as usability.

The Huracán has various components in common with the second generation of the Audi R8. This is due to the sharing of Volkswagen's sports car technology among both of the cars.

=== Interior ===
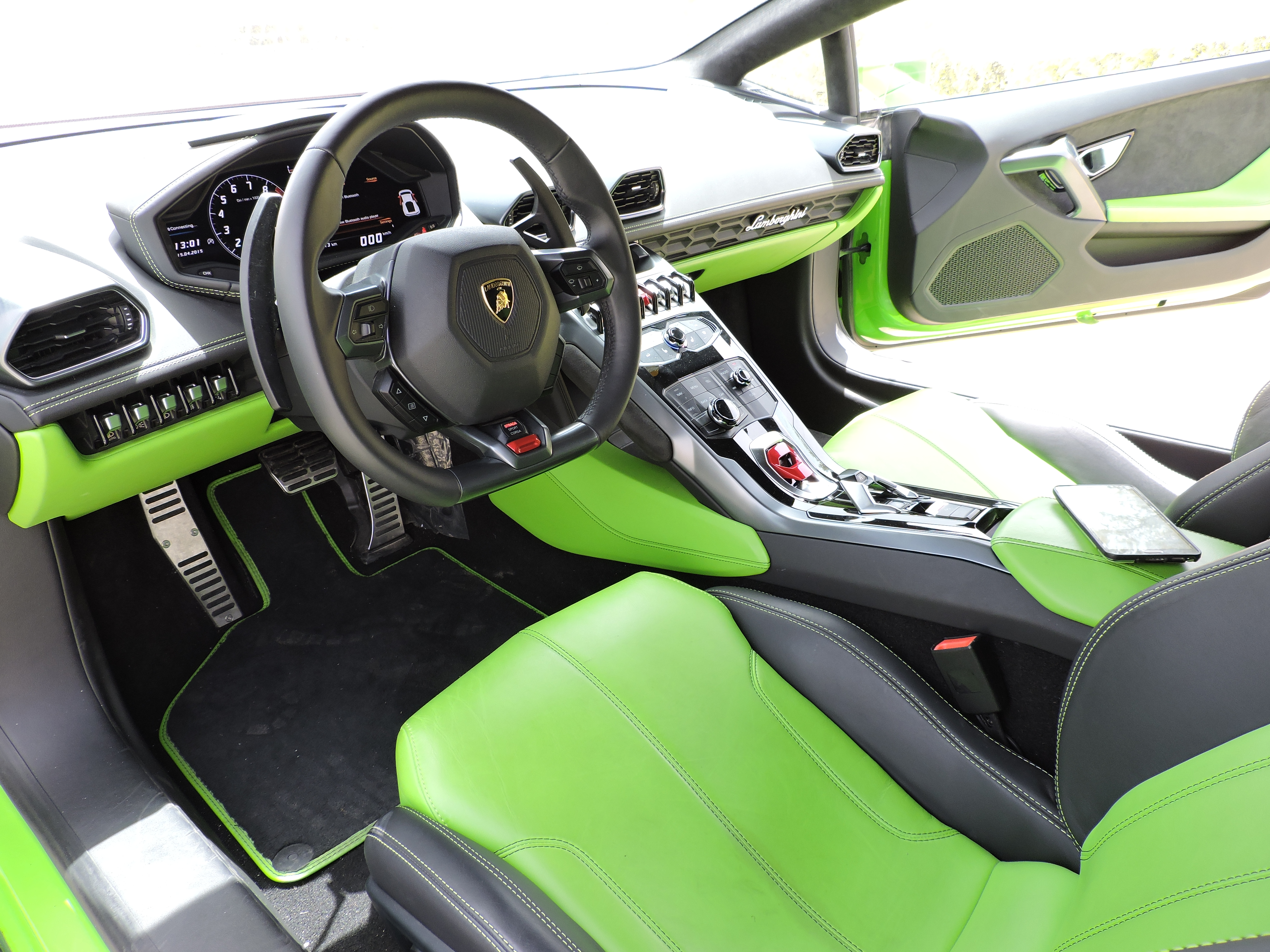
Interior

The Huracán has various interior options for upgraded comfort inside the car. It has a choice for full electric control and heating of the sport seats in addition to the standard lengthwise alignment and electric backrest. The car also has an optional navigation system and leather upholstering. The Huracán is one of the first sports cars moving the infotainment system out of the center stack: Lamborghini Infotainment System. The result: a display that lets the driver decide what they want to see. It is the first Lamborghini automobile to use the 12.3 inch TFT virtual cockpit from parent company Audi, which is available with high-definition (1440 x 540) 3D computer graphics, Bluetooth, Google Earth GPS navigation and Multi Media Interface-like menu and dashboard controls, all powered by Nvidia Tegra 3.

=== Technology ===
The car has full LED headlamps, and optional "Lamborghini Dynamic Steering" (LDS) to add to the standard power steering. The Dynamic Steering changes the steering performance from normal, comfortable steering to a racing feeling. The main control for changing the car's performance according to driving conditions is the mode selector ANIMA (Adaptive Network Intelligent Management). ANIMA controls the engine, the transmission, LDS, the all-wheel drive, magnetorheological suspension, and the electronic stability control. The Lamborghini Piattaforma Inerziale (LPI) carries out precise measurements of the vehicle movements using on board sensors (3 accelerometers and 3 gyroscopes) linked to ANIMA via high-speed FlexRay CAN bus. The driver can select street, sport, or race mode to alter how systems like the engine or transmission respond while driving.

== Huracán (2014–2019) ==
=== Huracán LP 610-4 Coupé (2014–2019) ===
The LP 610-4 designation comes from the car having 610 metric horsepower and four-wheel drive, while LP stands for "Longitudinale Posteriore", which refers to the longitudinal mid-rear engine position.

Changes from the Gallardo include full LED illumination, a 12.3 inch full-colour TFT instrument panel, fine napa leather and Alcantara interior upholstery, redesigned dashboard and central tunnel, Iniezione Diretta Stratificata (IDS, essentially an adapted version of parent Audi's Fuel Stratified Injection) direct and indirect gasoline injections, engine Stop & Start technology, EU6 emissions regulation compliance, Lamborghini Doppia Frizione (LDF) 7-speed dual-clutch transmission with 3 modes (STRADA, SPORT and CORSA), 20-inch wheels, carbon-ceramic braking system, optional Lamborghini Dynamic Steering variable steering system and MagneRide electromagnetic damper control.

Extra options that increase the price of the car include interior enhancements, special paint schemes, improved suspension, and a lifting system, as well as multiple components optionally available in carbon fibre, rather than aluminium.

=== Huracán LP 610-4 Spyder (2016–2019) ===
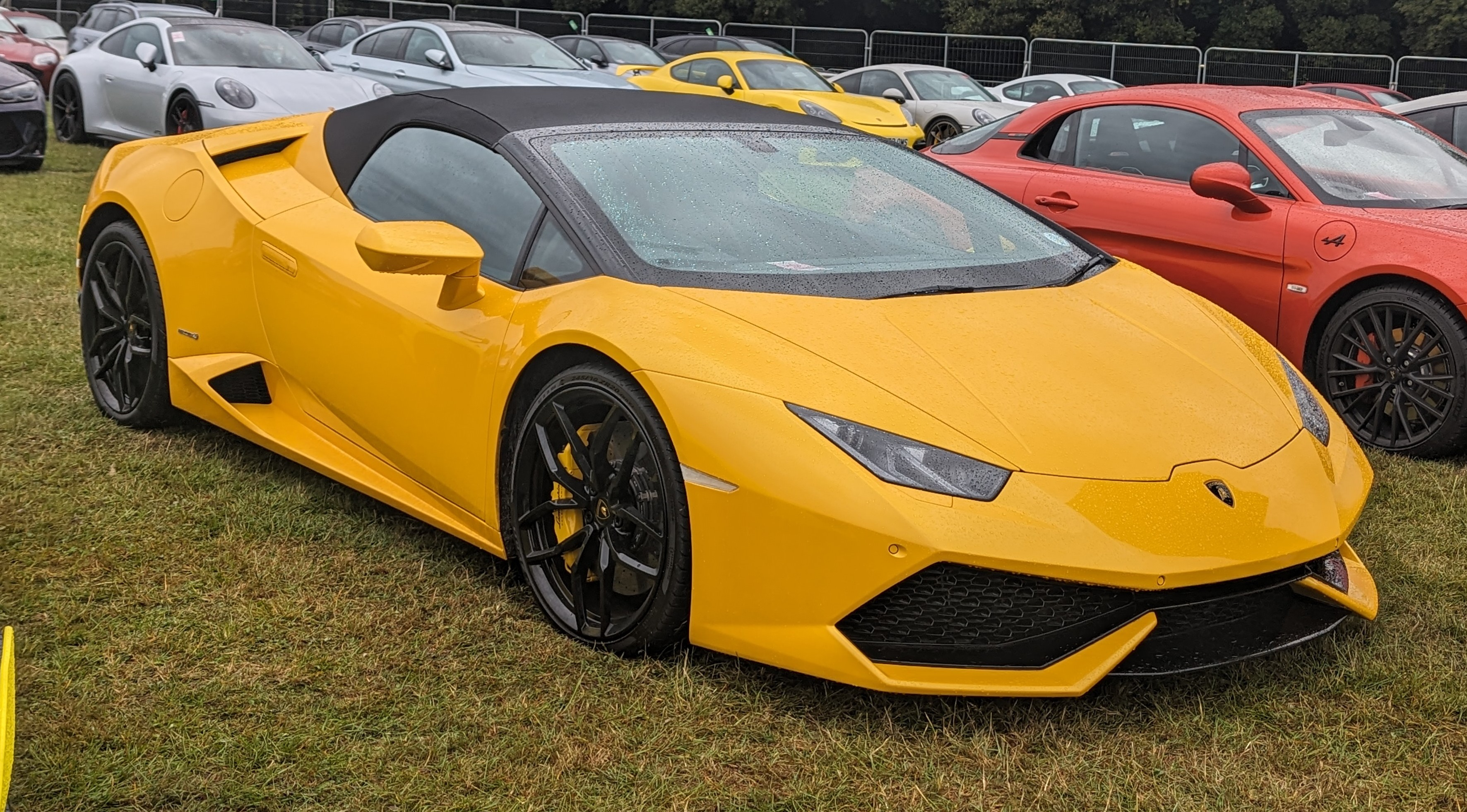

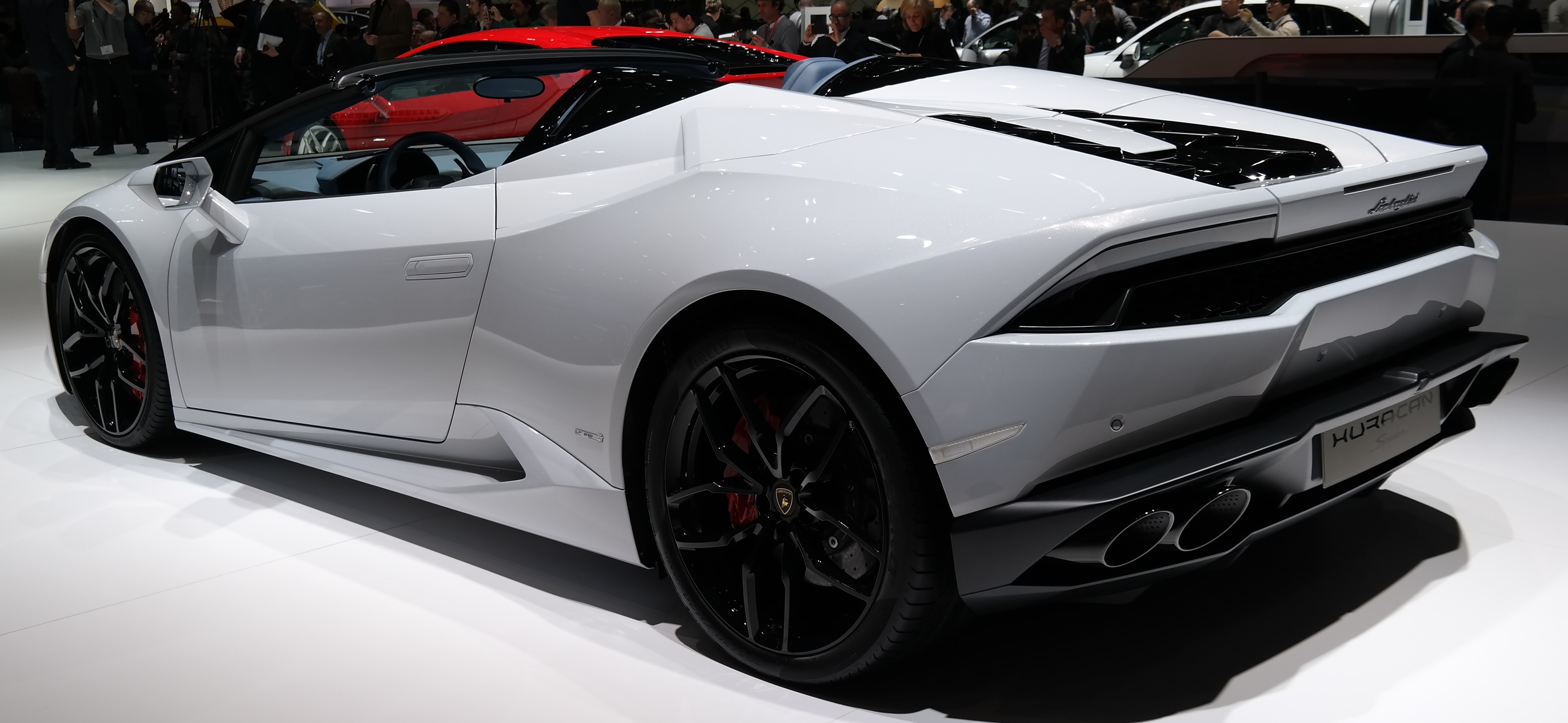
Lamborghini Huracán LP 610-4 Spyder

The convertible variant of the Huracán LP 610-4 was revealed at the Frankfurt Motor Show on 14 September 2015. The 5.2-litre naturally aspirated V10 engine is the same as the coupé and generates a maximum power output of 449 kW (602 hp; 610 PS). Car and Driver achieved a 0 to 97 km/h (60 mph) of 2.8 seconds, 0.3 seconds higher than their measured time for the coupe, a 0 to 161 km/h (100 mph) time of 5.9 seconds, and the top speed is a claimed 323 km/h (201 mph). It has the same 7-speed Lamborghini Doppia Frizione (LDF) dual-clutch transmission as that of the coupé. The Spyder has a dry weight of 1,542 kg (3,400 lb) which is 120 kg (265 lb) more than the coupé due to chassis reinforcing components. The Spyder has a CO_{2} emission of about 280 g/km.

=== Huracán LP 580-2 (2016–2019) ===
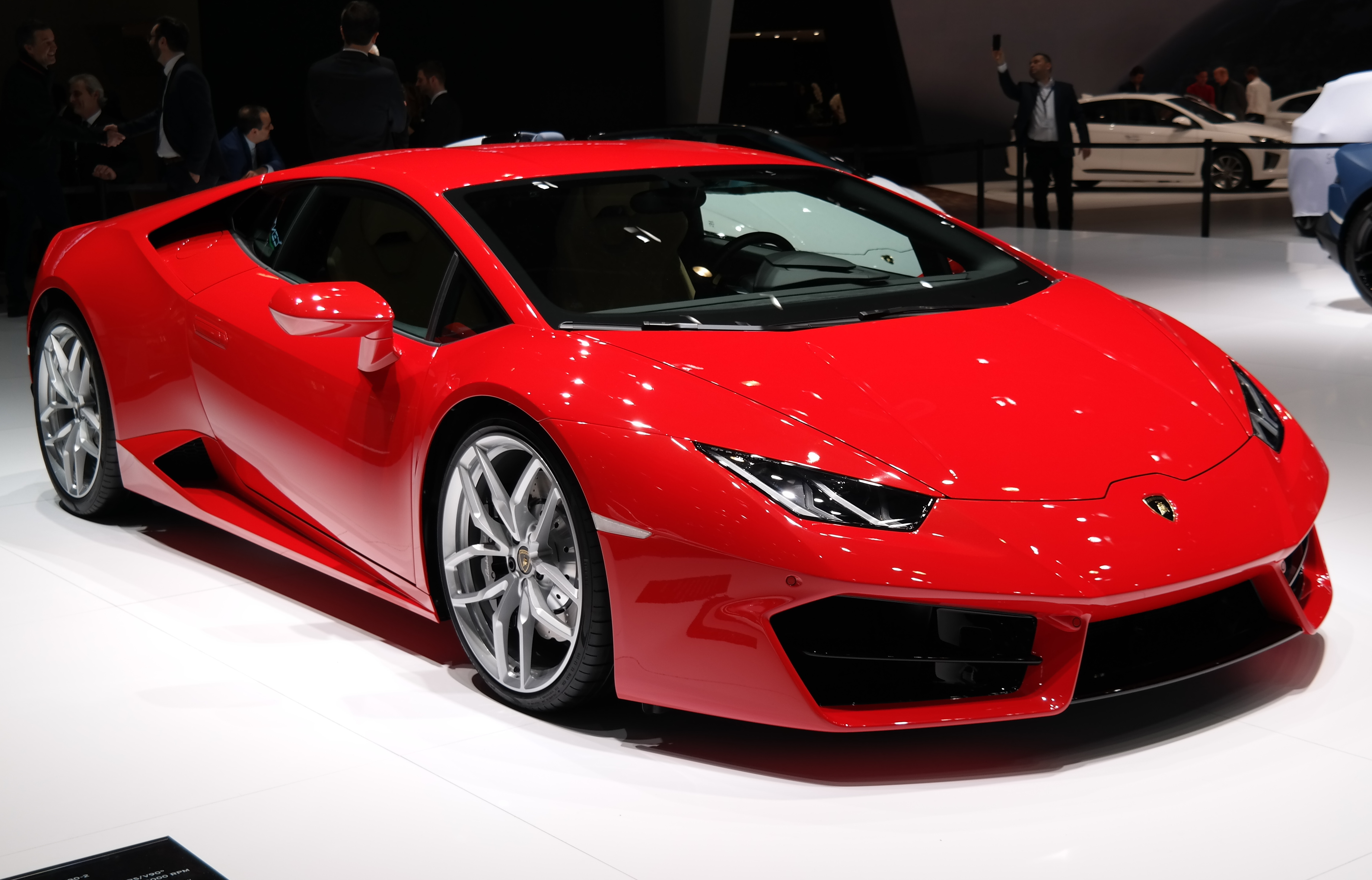

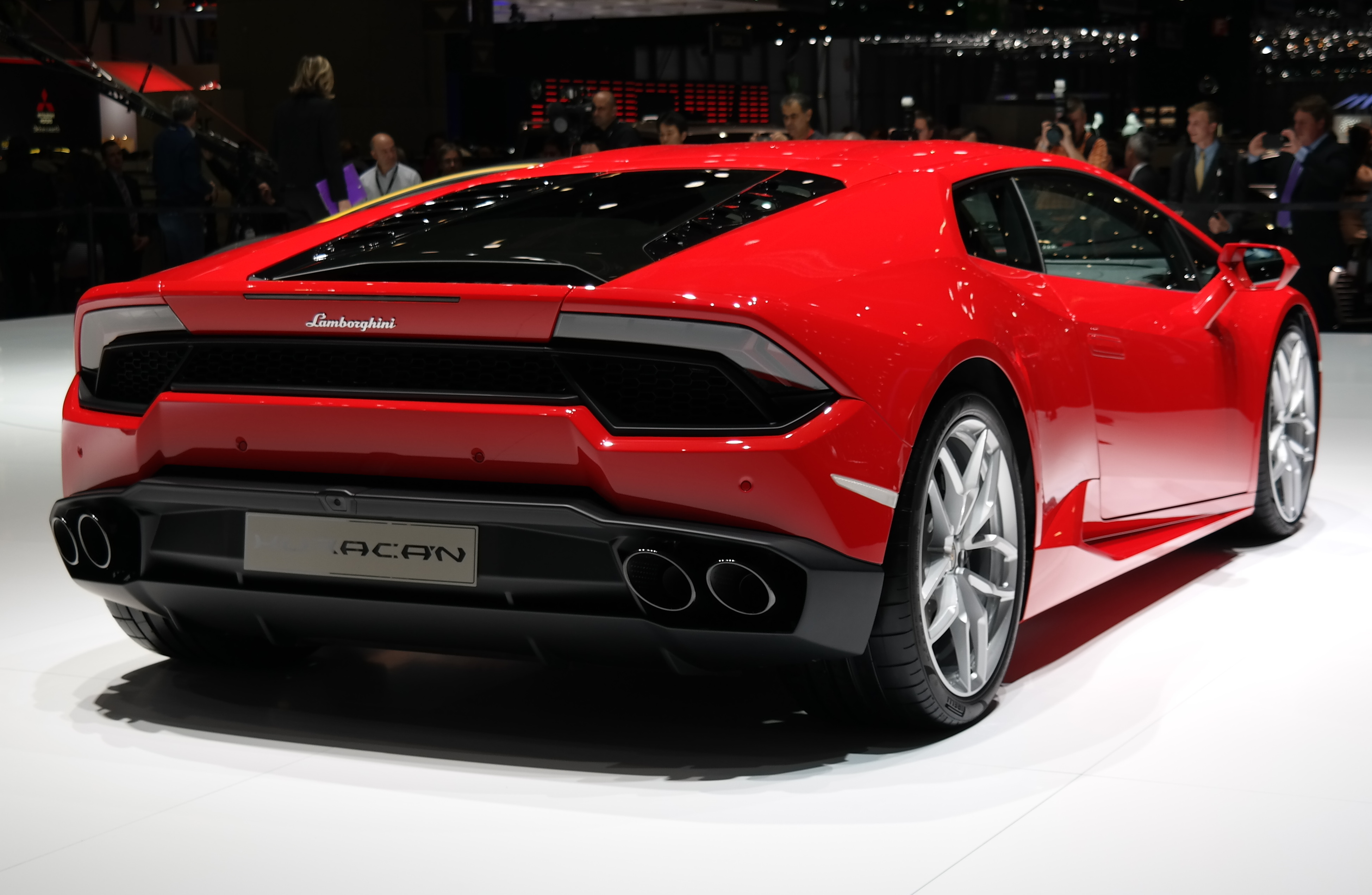
Lamborghini Huracán LP580-2

Unveiled at the 2016 Geneva Motor Show, the Huracán LP 580-2 is a lower cost derivative of the Huracán LP 610-4 that differs mostly in having the 5.2 L V10 engine detuned to 427 kW (572 hp; 580 PS) and 533 N⋅m (393 lb⋅ft) of torque along with having a rear wheel drive drivetrain instead of the all-wheel drive drivetrain found in the standard Huracán. Lamborghini claims the car will accelerate from 0–100 km/h (0–62 mph) in 3.4 seconds and 0–200 km/h (0–124 mph) in 10.1 seconds. The top speed is claimed to be as high as 320 km/h (199 mph). It also features slight visual differences to the standard variant of the car – with a different front fascia and larger air vents at the rear of the car for improved brake cooling. The seven-speed dual-clutch transmission is the same as used in the standard LP 610–4. The base level LP 580-2 costs US$201,100, about US$40,000 less than the base level LP 610–4.

=== Huracán LP 580-2 Spyder (2016–2019) ===
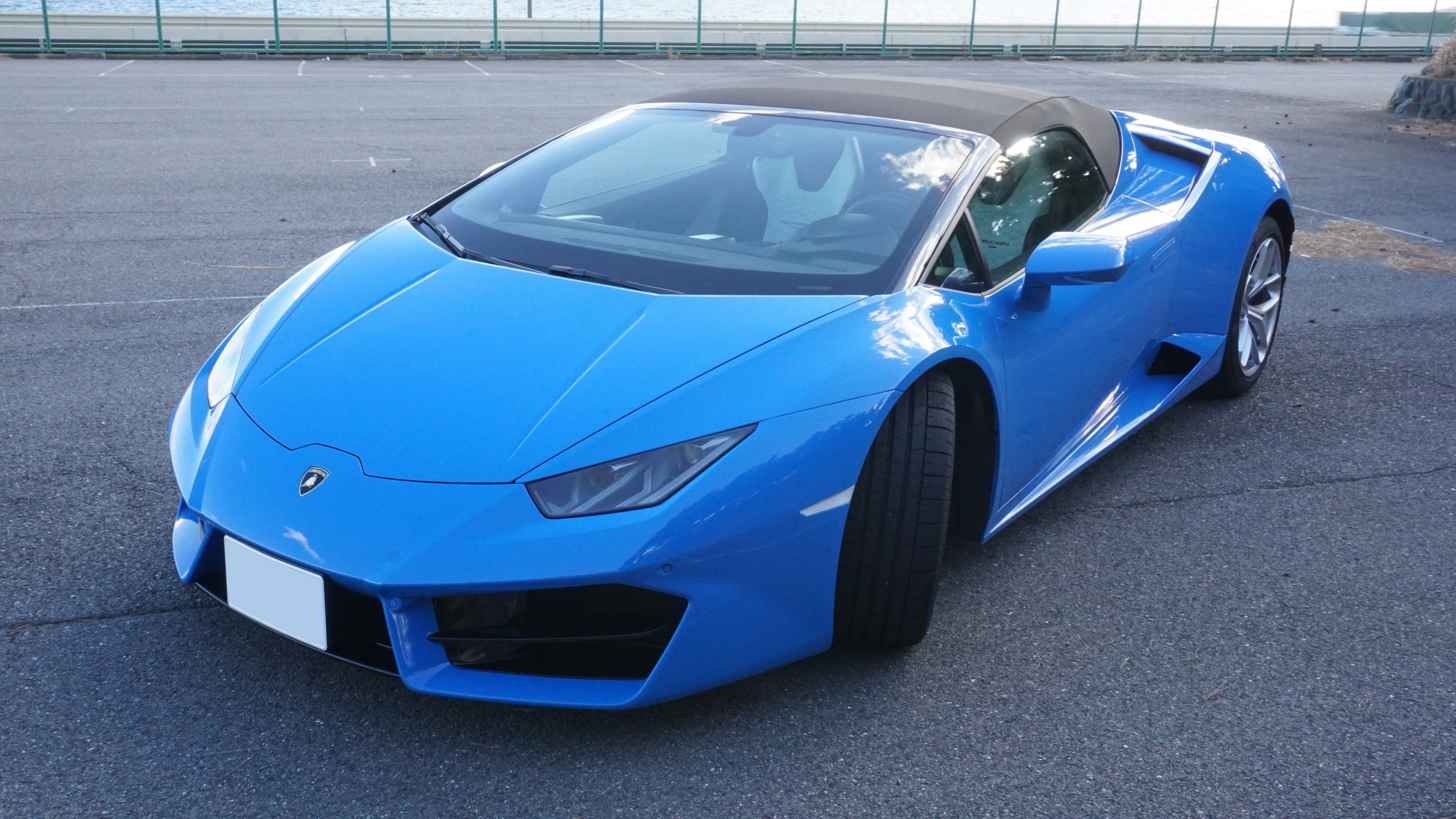
Lamborghini Huracán LP580-2 Spyder

A convertible variant of the Huracán LP 580-2 was unveiled at the Los Angeles Auto Show on 16 November 2016. The 5.2-litre naturally aspirated V10 engine is the same as in the coupé, and generates a maximum power output of 427 kW (572 hp; 580 PS). Motor Trend recorded a 0-60 mph (97 km/h) time of 3.2 seconds, and the top speed is 320 km/h (199 mph).

=== Huracán LP 640-4 Performante (2017–2019) ===
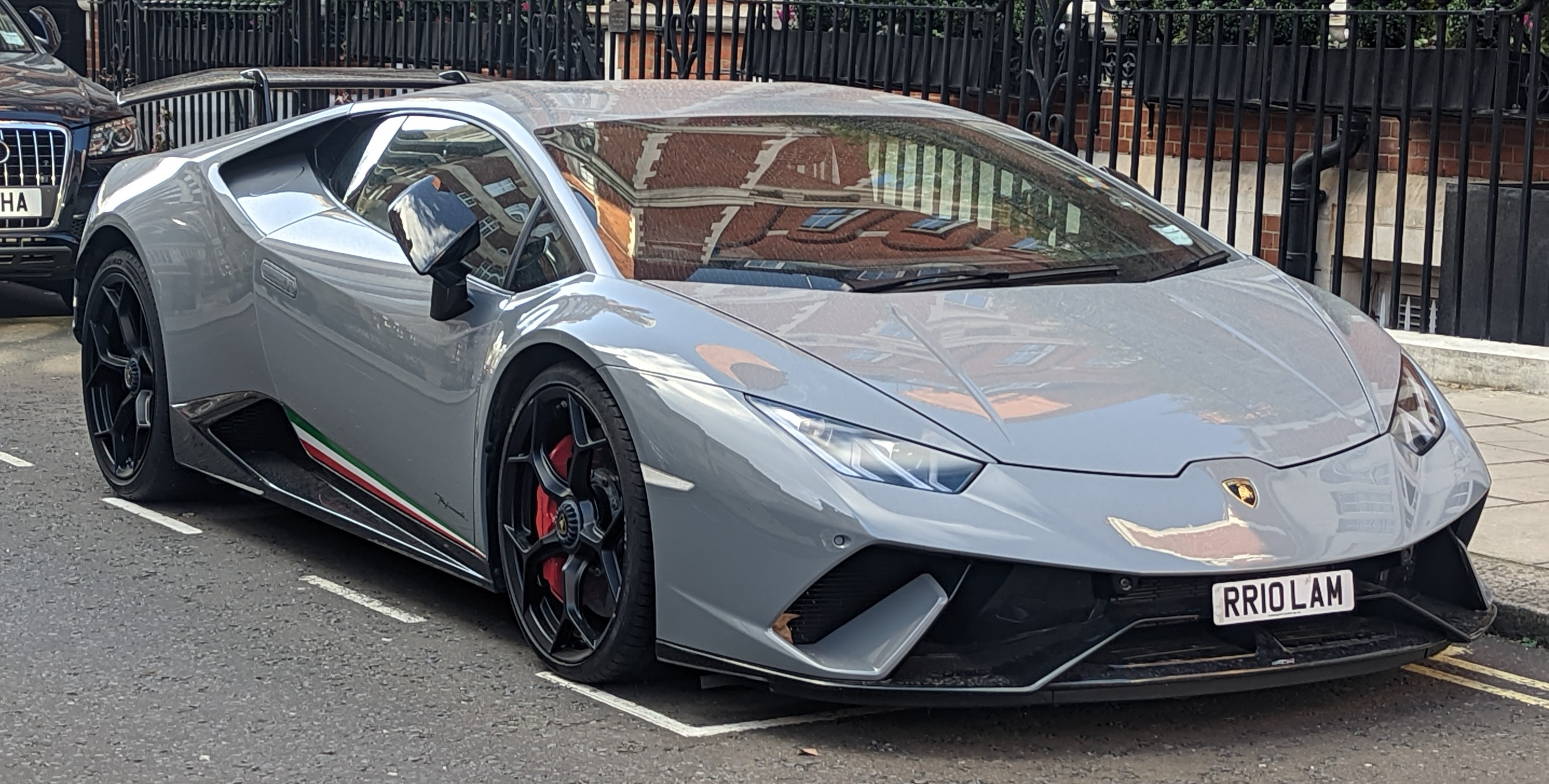
Lamborghini Huracán Performante front view

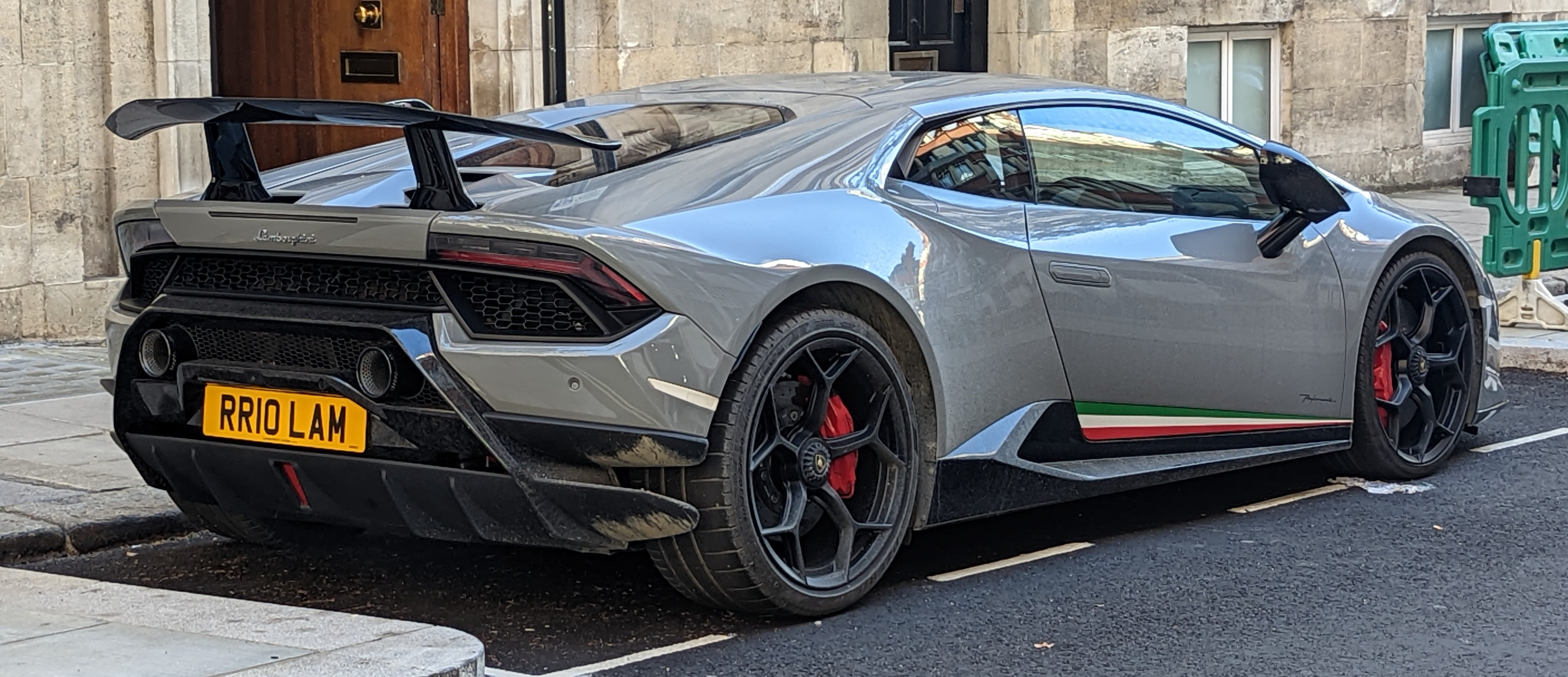
Lamborghini Huracán Performante rear view

A track oriented variant of the Huracán, called the Performante, was unveiled at the 2017 Geneva Motor Show.

The Performante underwent various exterior changes with the most noticeable being the front and rear bumpers. Carbon fibre is used for the bumpers and the side skirts. An adjustable carbon fibre rear wing has been added to increase downforce. The position of the exhaust has also been changed, and is now just a bit above the rear diffuser. The interior also underwent noticeable changes, now sporting new seats and a new digital speedometer (similar to that of the Aventador SV's speedometer).

The Performante's 5.2-litre V10 has been tuned to have a power output of 471 kW (631 hp; 640 PS) at 8,000 rpm and 601 N⋅m (443 lb⋅ft) of torque at 6,500 rpm. The weight has also decreased by 40 kg (88 lb), courtesy of the forged aluminium and forged carbon fibre body components (first used in the construction of the Sesto Elemento). All the new aero components on the car have active aerodynamic capability and help keep the car stable at high speeds. The Performante is capable of accelerating from 0–100 km/h (0–62 mph) in 2.9 seconds, 0–200 km/h (0–124 mph) in 8.9 seconds. It also has a theoretical top speed of 325 km/h (200 mph).

The car has been stiffened by 10% with new springs, roll bars, and radial axial arm bushings. The magnetorheological suspension has been reworked to give a driver a serious track experience. The Lamborghini Dynamic Steering has been re-calibrated. The Performante utilises Lamborghini's new ALA (Aerodinamica Lamborghini Attiva) system, which is said to be 80% lighter than regular sports car hydraulic systems. According to Lamborghini, ALA is also said to provide 750% more downforce than the standard Huracán.

=== Huracán LP 640-4 Performante Spyder (2018–2019) ===
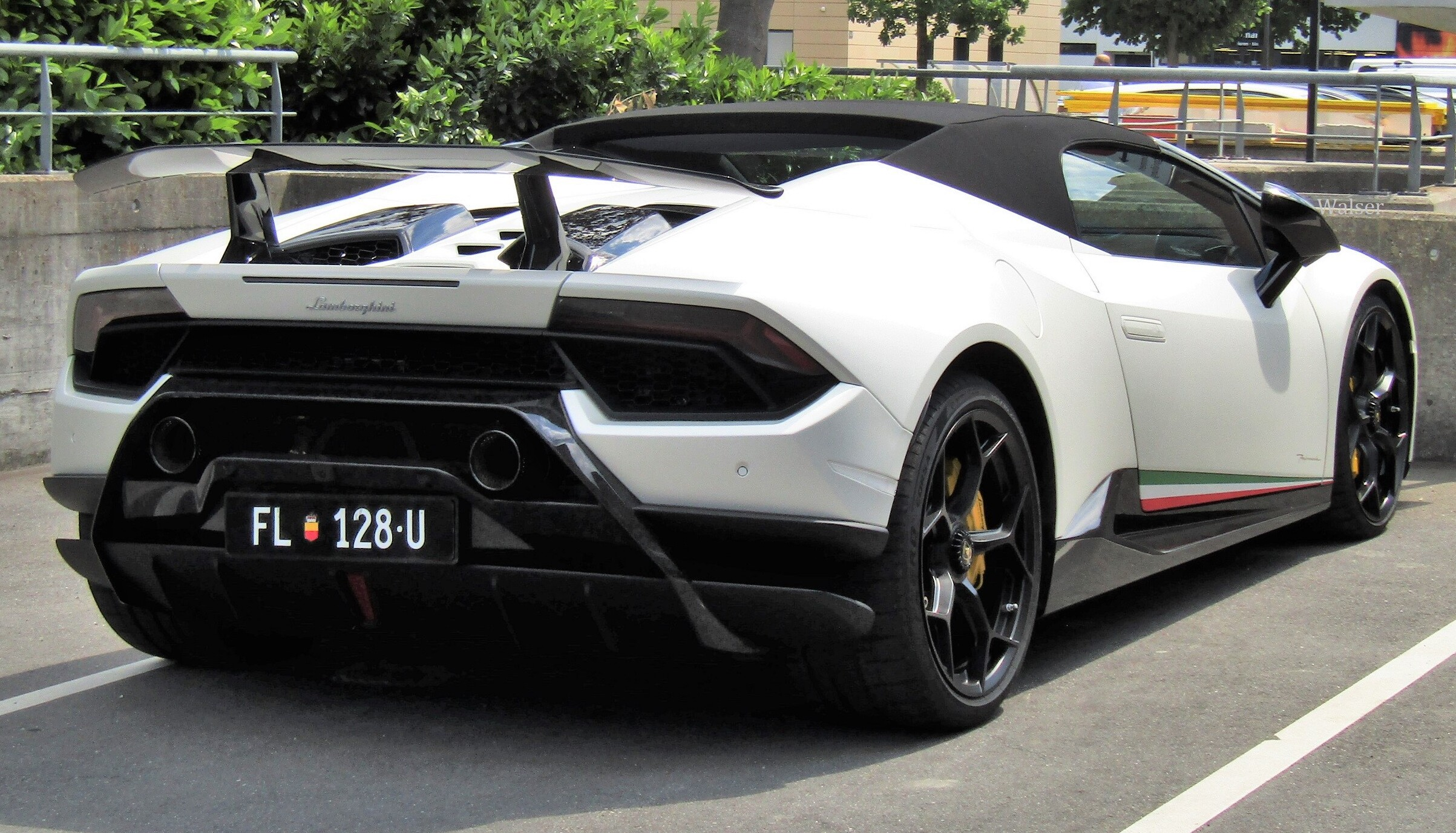
Lamborghini Huracán Performante Spyder

The Lamborghini Huracán Performante Spyder was unveiled at the 2018 Geneva Motor Show. It takes much of the styling inspiration from the coupé and the outgoing LP 610-4 Spyder. The Spyder is identical to the coupé from performance and technological standpoint, but the acceleration time from 0–97 km/h (0–60 mph) has risen by one-tenth of a second and stands at 3.1 seconds while the 0–200 km/h (0–124 mph) has risen by four-tenths of a second and stands at 9.3 seconds. Due to the loss of the roof, the Spyder weighs 125 kg (276 lb) more than the coupé due to chassis reinforcing components. Top speed remains the same as well and stands at 325 km/h (202 mph). Deliveries of the Spyder began in the fourth quarter of 2018.

== Facelift (2019–2024) ==
=== Huracán LP 640-4 Evo (2019–2024) ===
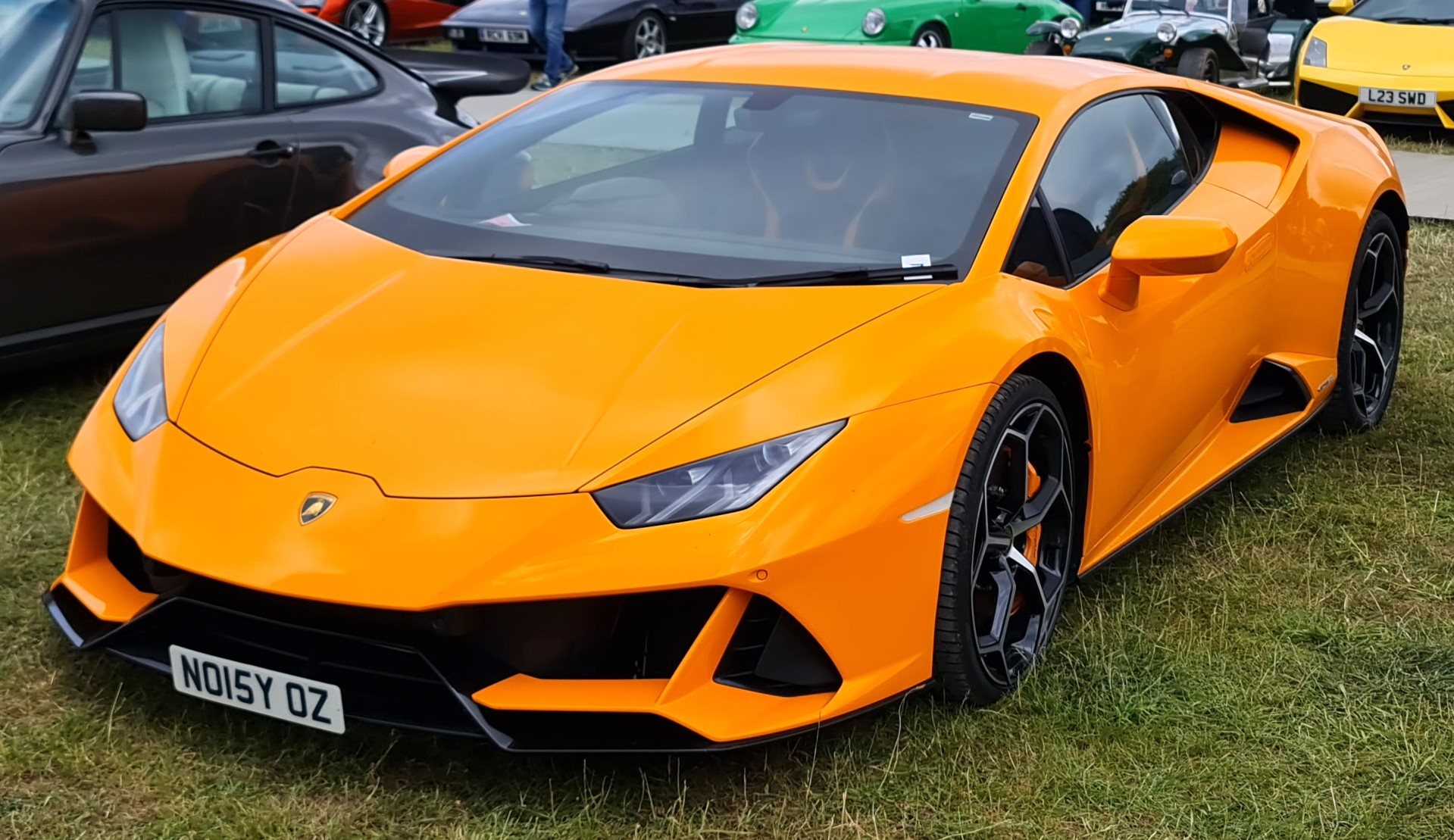
Lamborghini Huracán Evo front view

The Huracán received a mid-cycle update in 2019, now being called the Huracán Evo. It now shares its engine and some of the technology with the Performante variant.

The updated version of the Huracán has a more aggressive design language, the new front bumper has integrated aeroblades for improved downforce along with the rear styling inspired by the Performante variant, having the same rear diffuser, exhaust pipe position and radiators. A new ducktail spoiler improves downforce by 5 times as compared to the outgoing model. The engine is shared with the Performante and generates 471 kW (631 hp; 640 PS) at 8,000 rpm and 601 N⋅m (443 lb⋅ft) of torque at 6,500 rpm. The exhaust system is more refined and has titanium intake valves. This allows the car to achieve a 0–97 km/h (0–60 mph)acceleration time of 2.9 seconds, 0–200 km/h (0–124 mph) acceleration time of 9 seconds and a top speed of 325 km/h (202 mph). The car has a braking distance from 100–0 km/h (62–0 mph) of 104 ft (32 m).

The Huracán Evo has a rear-wheel steering system for improved handling and a torque vectoring system. A new central processing unit controls the various functions of the car and monitors various settings. The control system is controlled by the new infotainment system (via an 8.4 inch touchscreen) dubbed the Lamborghini Dinamica Veicolo Integrata which has integrated both Apple CarPlay and Android Auto. The infotainment system predicts the driving modes by a feed forward logic.

The feed forward logic works by sensors monitoring the lateral, longitudinal and vertical accelerations, as well as roll, pitch and yaw rate to predict the best possible driving mode for the driver. The magnetorheological suspension is also revised and now uses electromagnetic current to adjust the suspension system in accordance with the driving mode.

The transmission system from the outgoing model is retained which transfers power to all four wheels. A new Ego mode allows the driver to change driving settings to their own preference.

=== Huracán LP 640-4 Evo Spyder (2019–2024) ===
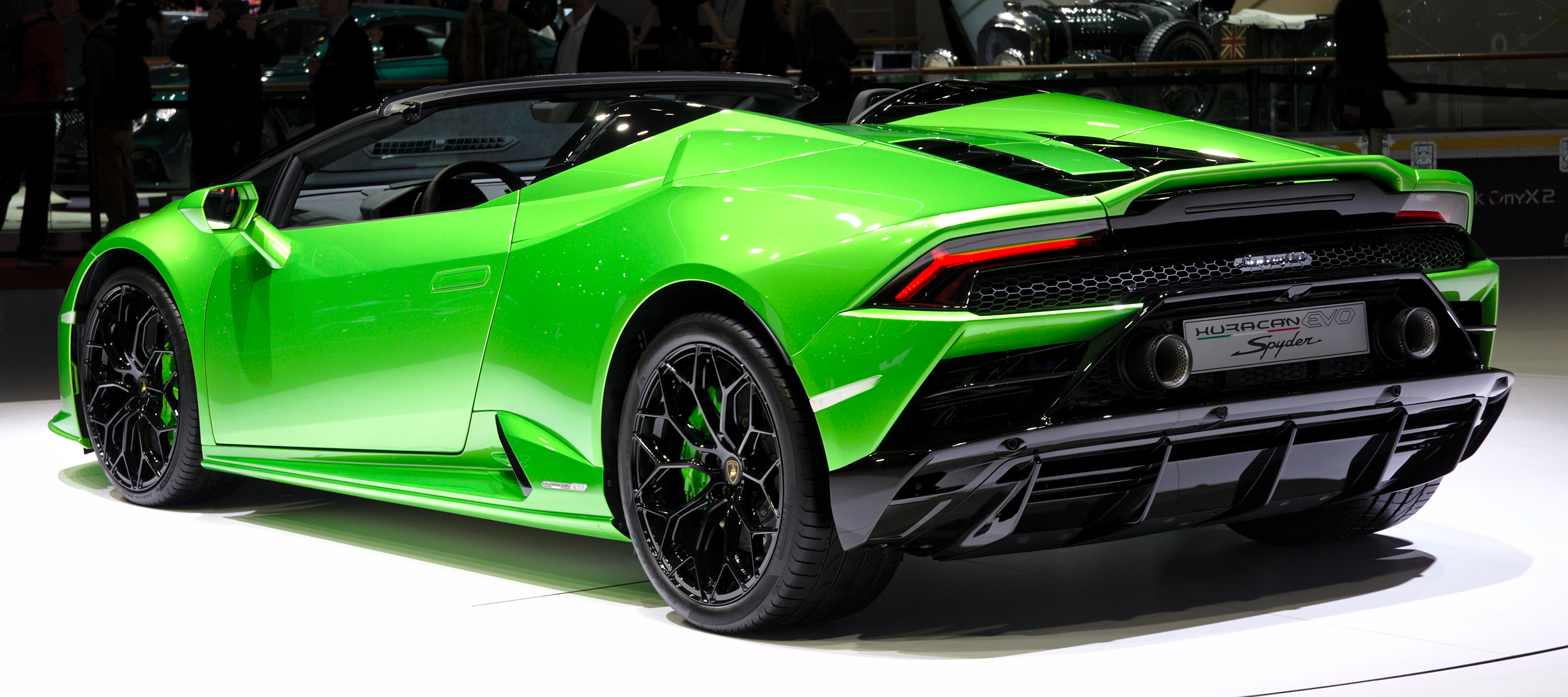
2019 Lamborghini Huracan Evo Spyder rear view

The Huracán Evo Spyder was introduced online in February 2019. The Spyder has the same enhancements as the coupé but is 100 kg (220 lb) heavier due to the addition of chassis reinforcement components owing to the loss of the roof. The car has the same canvas folding soft top as the outgoing model which takes 17 seconds for operation and is operable at speeds up to 50 km/h (31 mph). The Spyder can accelerate to 100 km/h (62 mph) in 3.1 seconds from a standstill, to 200 km/h (124 mph) in 9.3 seconds and can attain a top speed of 325 km/h (202 mph).

=== Huracán LP 610-2 Evo RWD (2020–2024) ===
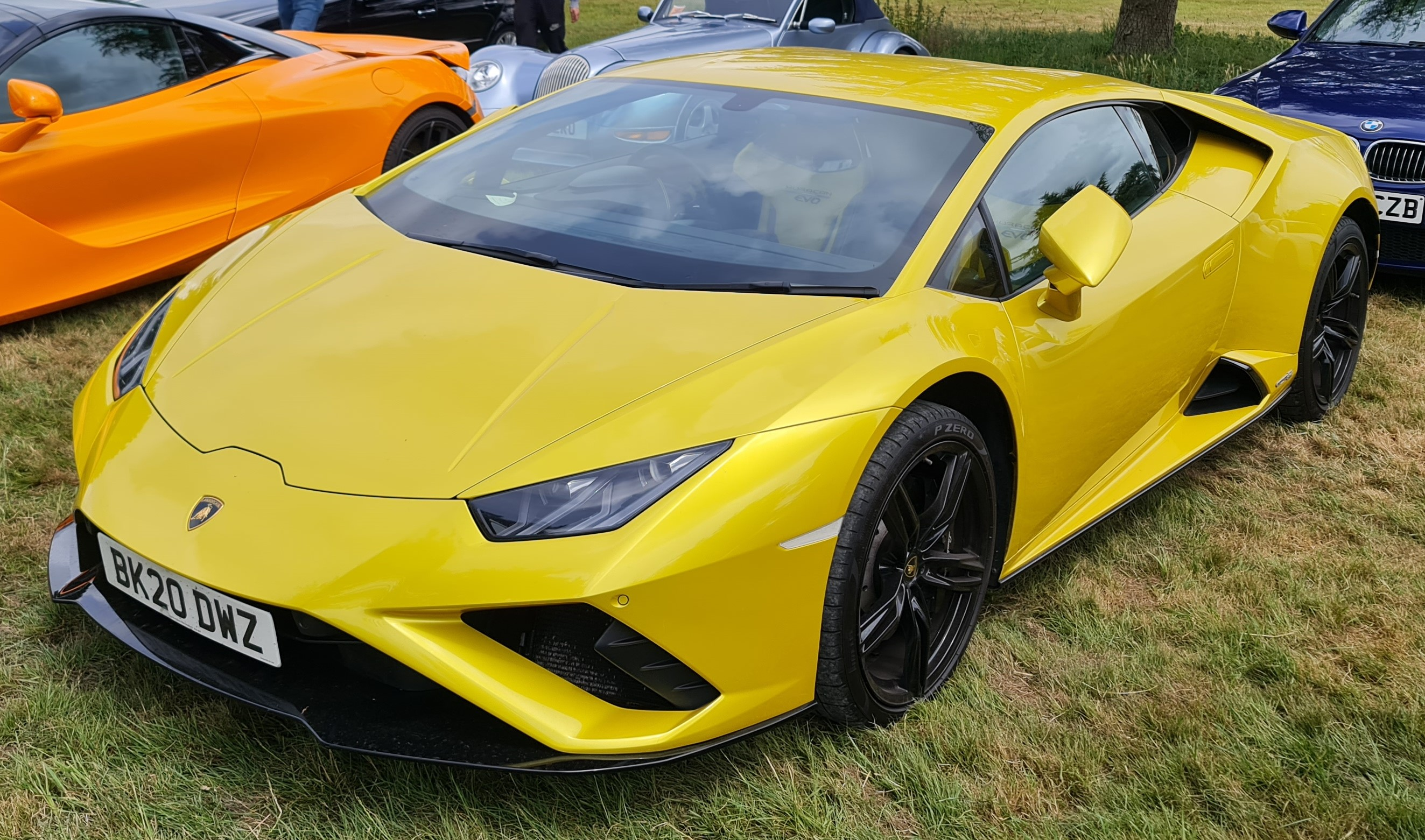
Lamborghini Huracán Evo RWD front view

A rear-wheel drive variant of the Evo debuted in January 2020, replacing the LP 580–2. The front splitter has been reshaped and generates more airflow, which is directed to the revised diffuser. Unique to the RWD model is P-TCS (Performance Traction Control System) that ensures that torque is not cut off abruptly; Lamborghini claims this increases oversteer by 30 percent compared to the LP 580–2. The engine is detuned and is now rated at 449 kW (602 hp; 610 PS). Due to the detuned engine, the car is slower than the standard Huracán Evo accelerating to 100 km/h (62 mph) in 3.3 seconds while having the same top speed. The car also receives a unique paint option, Giallo Belenus, along with a matching interior upholstered in leather and microsuede.

=== Huracán LP 610-2 Evo RWD Spyder (2020–2024) ===
A convertible version of the rear-wheel drive variant of the Evo was showcased in May 2020, replacing the LP 580-2 Spyder. Like the Coupé variant, the convertible has a power output of 449 kW (602 hp; 610 PS). The convertible has a 0–97 km/h (0–60 mph) acceleration time of 3.5 seconds and has a claimed top speed of 323 km/h (201 mph).

=== Huracán LP 640-2 STO (2021–2024) ===
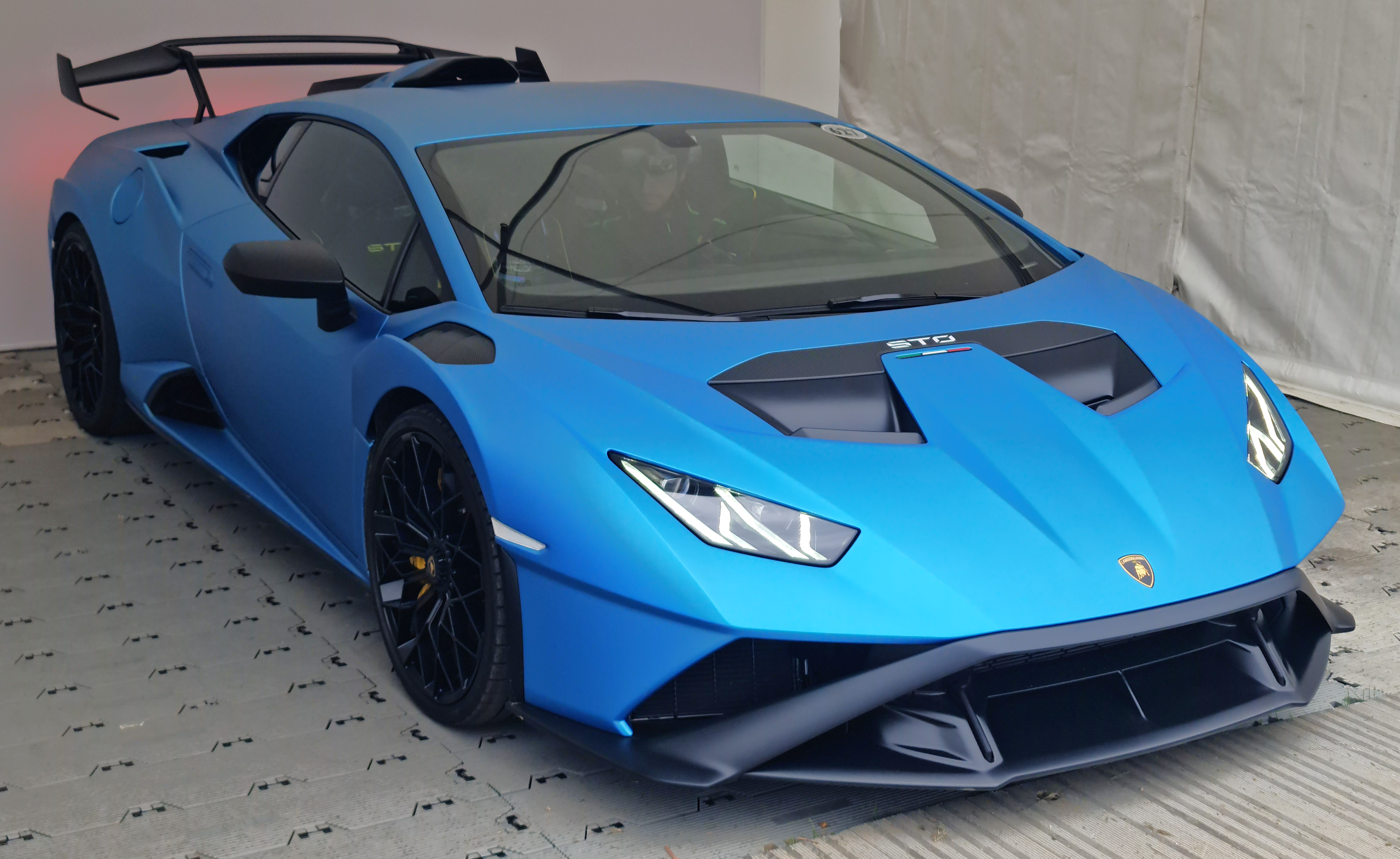

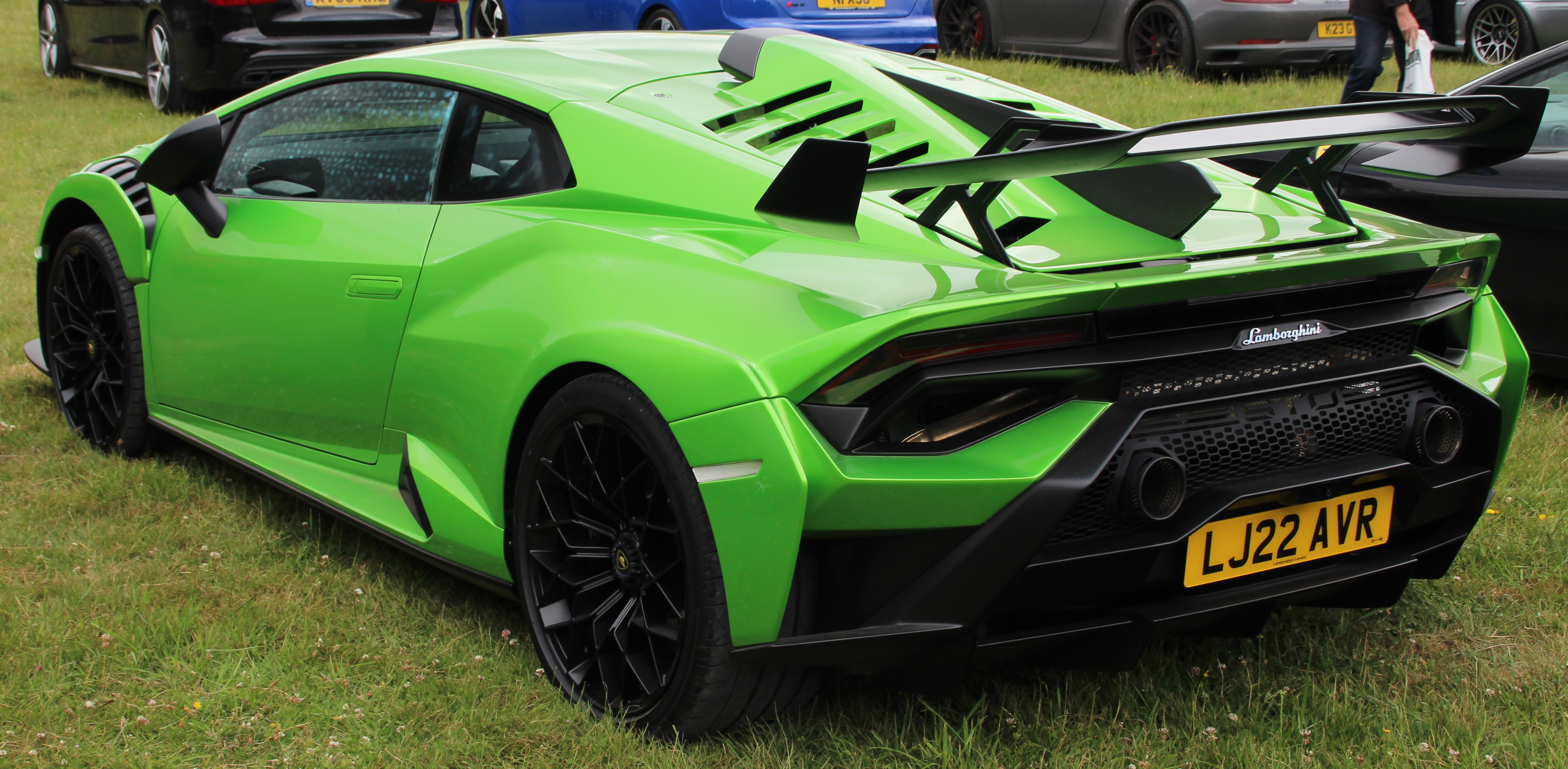
Huracán STO

The Huracán STO (Super Trofeo Omologato) is a track focused variant of the Huracán. The STO has a taller rear wing with a roof snorkel for engine cooling. There is a shark fin aerodynamic device connecting the roof snorkel with the rear wing. The engine cover is reminiscent of the Lamborghini Super Trofeo Evo race cars. The entire hood opens to reveal a small compartment for storing racing equipment and the body is made of 75% carbon fibre. The engine and the power output of the STO is the same as the Huracán Performante and the Huracán Evo and it has rear-wheel drive with a rear wheel steering system and CCMR brakes inspired from Formula 1. The STO comes with three new driving modes: STO for road driving, TROFEO for fast lap times on dry tarmac, and PIOGGIA for wet weather driving. The bucket seats on the interior feature racing harnesses.

=== Huracán LP 640-2 Tecnica (2022–2024) ===
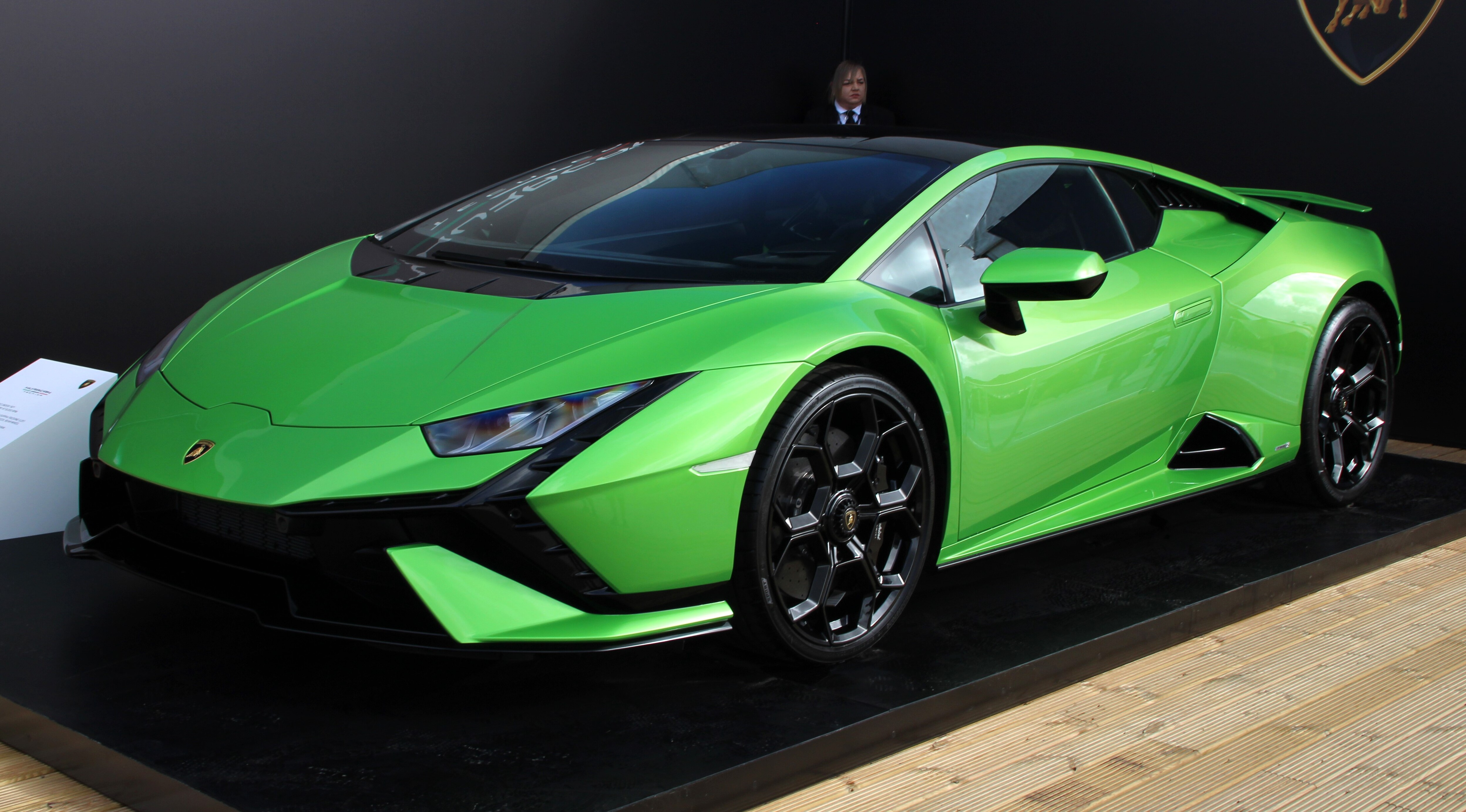
Huracán Tecnica

Unveiled on April 12, 2022, The Huracán Tecnica sits between the EVO RWD and the track-focused STO. It is 6.1 cm (2.4 in) longer than the EVO, but is the same height and width. It uses the naturally aspirated V10 engine from the STO and has a top speed of 325 km/h (202 mph) and an acceleration time of 0–100 km/h (0–62 mph) in 3.2 seconds. According to Lamborghini, the Tecnica's aerodynamic changes increase downforce by 35 percent and reduce drag by 20 percent compared to the EVO.

=== Huracán LP 610-4 Sterrato (2023–2024) ===
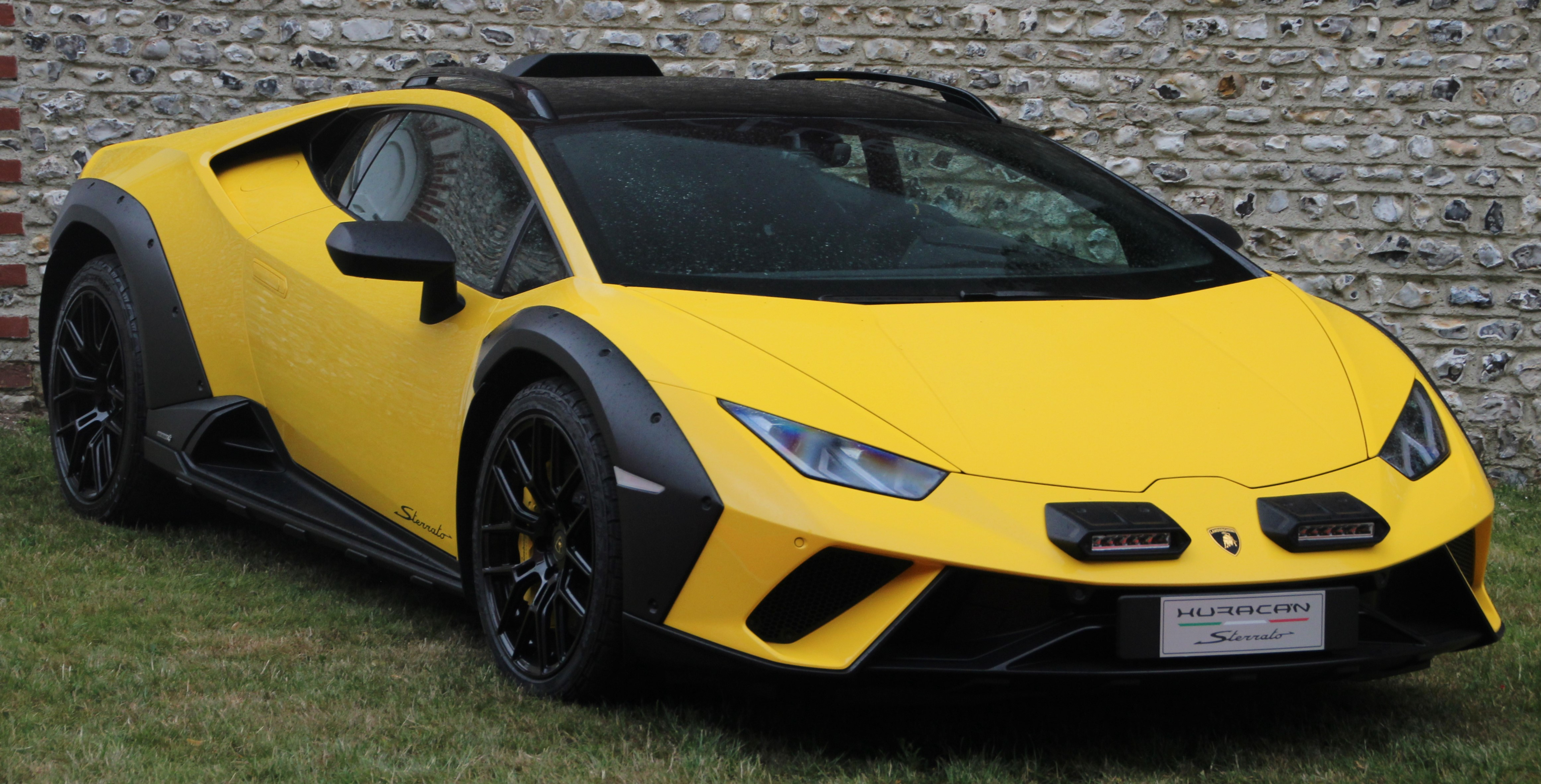
Lamborghini Huracán Sterrato

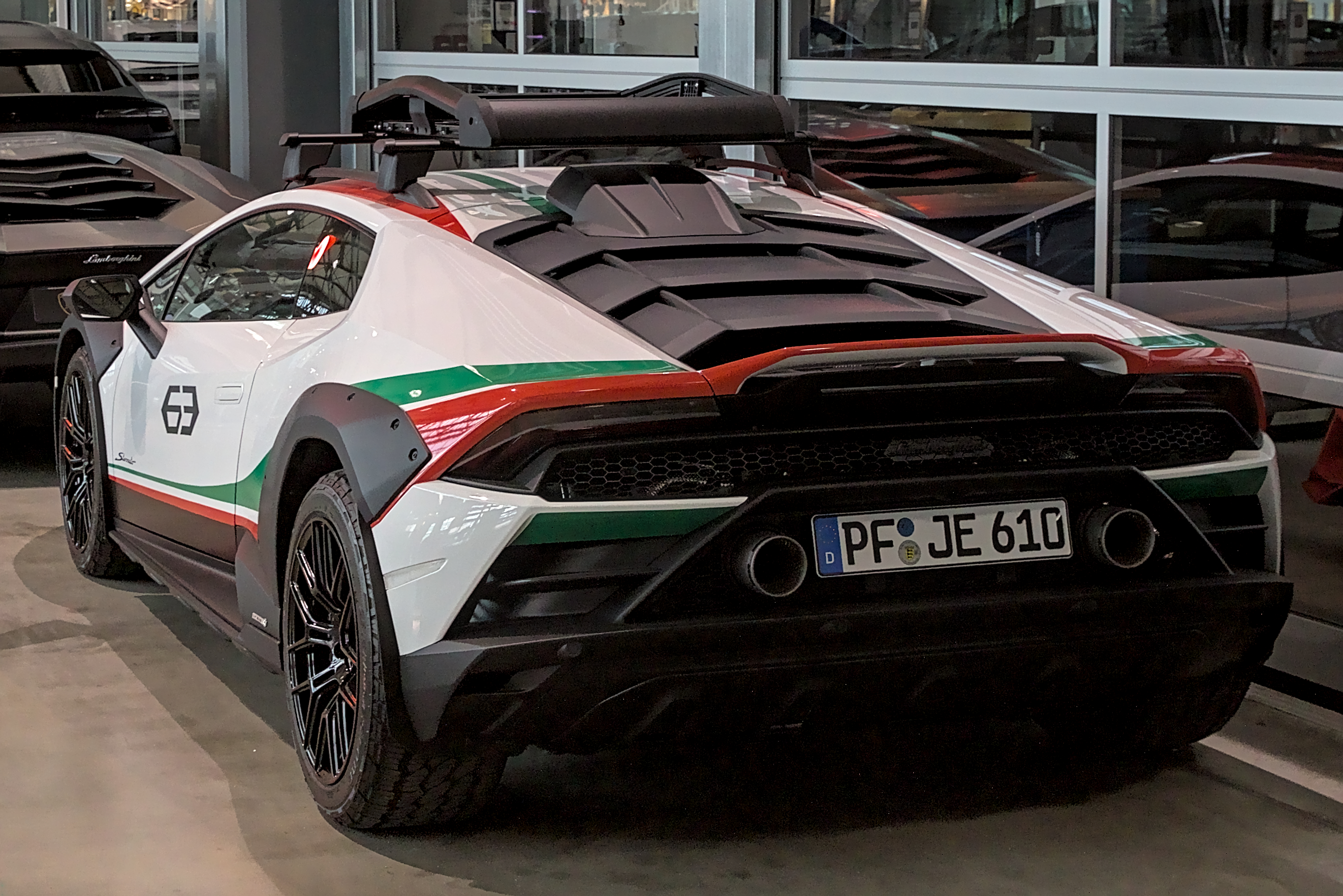
Lamborghini Huracán Sterrato rear view

In June 2019, Lamborghini introduced an off-road concept sports car based on the Huracán Evo called the Huracán Sterrato. The ground clearance of the car was increased by 47 mm (2 in) with the car's front approach improved by 1% and the departure angle enhanced by 6.5%. The wheel track is also increased by 30 mm (1 in) and the Sterrato has new wide body fender flares with integrated air-intakes for improved airflow for the brakes. The car is fitted with 20-inch wheels with special tyres for increased grip during off-roading. The car also comes with a reinforced frame and integrated skidpads for protection against debris. Fog lights fitted at the front and a roof rack complete the aggressive exterior appearance.

The engine is shared with the Huracán Evo and has the same output as the Evo. Its LDVI (Lamborghini Dinamica Veicolo Integrata) system is modified and now comes with "predictive logic", a central processing unit that controls aspects of the car's behavior, including systems that attempt to anticipate driver actions and needs.

The production version of the Huracán Sterrato was unveiled at Art Basel in Miami on 30 November 2022. It is an all-terrain variant of the Hurácan. Changes over other variants include a 1.7-inch higher ground clearance, revamped suspension with greater travel, widened front and rear track, LED lights mounted to the front bumper, additional protective underbody sills, and Bridgestone all-terrain tires. In addition, it features a unique Rally mode, which optimizes the suspension and all-wheel drive system for driving on gravel, dirt, and sand. In November 2022, Lamborghini confirmed that the Hurácan Sterrato will be the last non-hybrid model to be launched.

Special versions of the Sterrato are the Alpha, limited to 50 units (2023), and the Sterrato All-Terrain Ad Personam (revealed in April 2024 at the Milan Design Week), which was limited to 12 units in four different finishes: NEVE (snow), SABBIA (sand), BOSCO (green track), and TERRA (gravel). All have a matte black look for the roof and rear bonnet, along with the roof rails and cross bars. The total production of Sterratos was 1,499 examples.

== Special editions ==
=== Huracán LP 610-4 Polizia (2014) ===
The Huracán LP 610-4 Polizia is the official police car variant specifically produced for the Italian State Police, after one of the two Gallardos used by the Polizia Stradale was destroyed in the course of patrol duty. This model sports various features exclusive to the car, such as blue Polizia body colour, white stripes and lettering following the Huracán's dynamic design language, a video system positioned in the centre of the cabin with a camera fitted next to the rear view mirror, a police computer, recording equipment behind the seats, a Proof Video Data System, gun holster, police radio equipment, a Paletta (the traditional hand-held stop sign used to advise motorists and traffic offenders to pull over), a removable screen, a refrigeration system at the luggage compartment in the front of the vehicle (for use in the vehicle's role in transporting organs for transplantation), a defibrillator, and a police beacon with blue LEDs around the base and white LED signals on the front, sides and rear of the light's aluminium shell.

=== Huracán LP 610-4 Avio (2017) ===
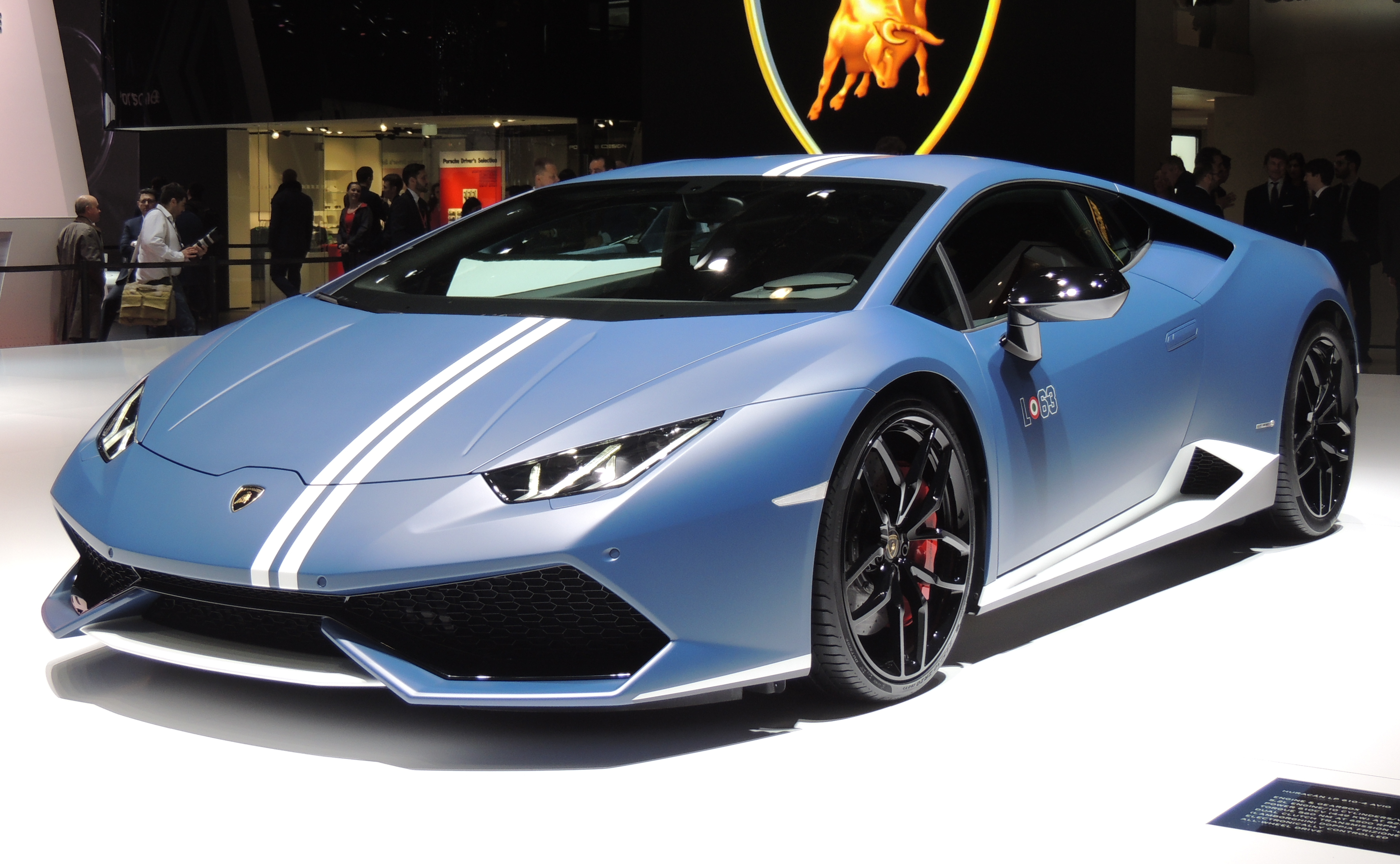
Lamborghini Huracán Avio at the 2016 Geneva Motor Show

Unveiled at the 2016 Geneva Motor Show as a 2017 model year, the Avio is the first limited edition of the Huracán, bringing new colours, upholstery, exterior decals and interior logos inspired by the Italian fighter jets along with featuring a tricolore cockade in Red, White and Green. The Avio is dedicated to the Italian Air Force with the 5 exterior paint choices named after coats of arms from the Italian Air Force Academy: Blu Grifo (pictured), Grigio Falco, Grigio Nibbio, Grigio Vulcano and Verde Turbine. A special edition plaque is affixed to the windowsill behind the driver's seat indicating the limited number of 250 examples offered worldwide.

=== Huracán Evo GT Celebration (2019) ===
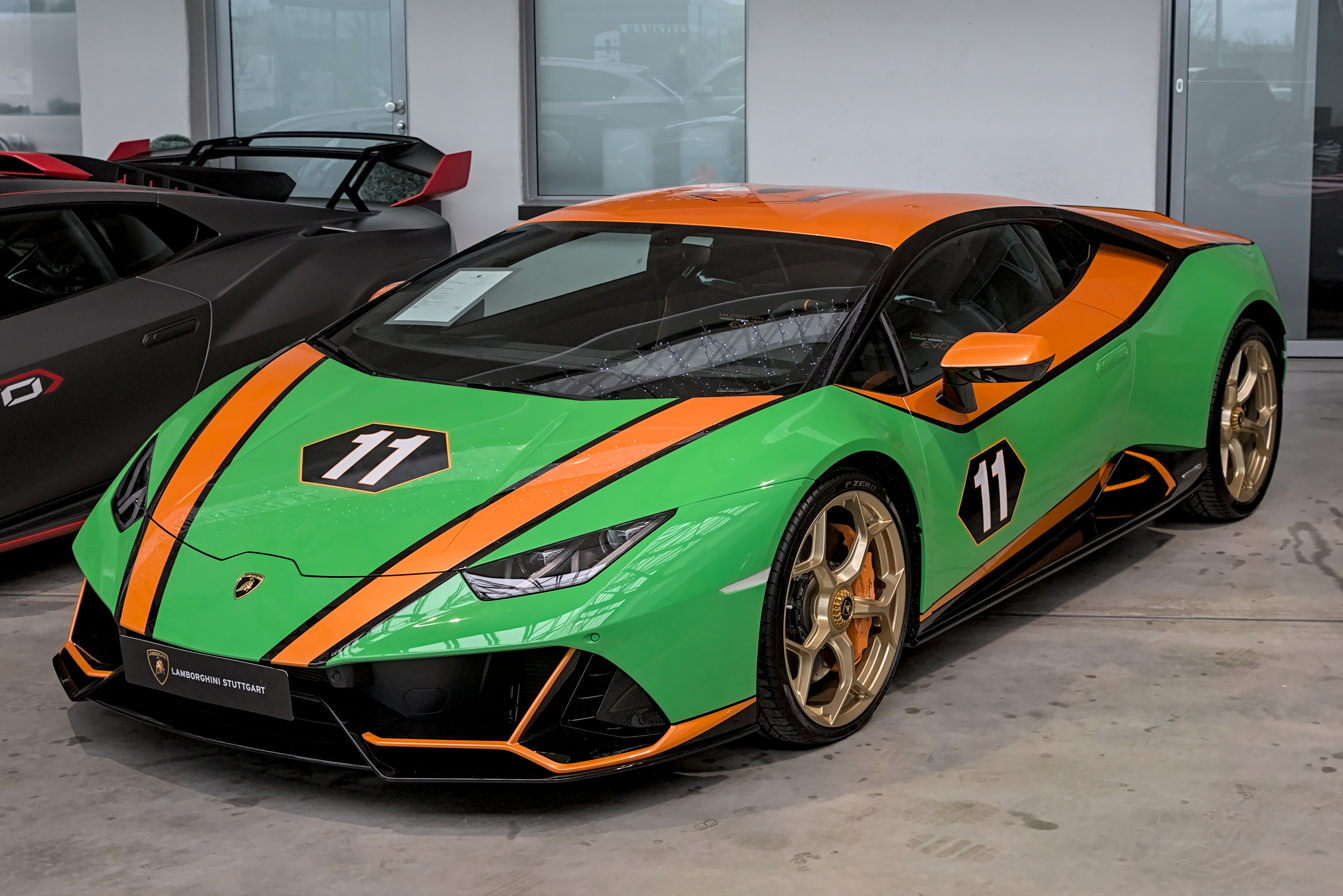
Lamborghini Huracán Evo GT Celebration in Germany

The Huracán Evo GT Celebration is a limited-edition Huracán EVO AWD model with a limited production of 36 units worldwide. It pays tribute to Lamborghini's consecutive victories during 2018 and 2019 at the 24 Hours of Daytona and the 12 Hours of Sebring, being the youngest team to do so. The number 36 is the total sum time of the two famous endurance races, also known as the “36 Hours of Florida”. It was unveiled with another special edition, the Lamborghini Aventador SVJ 63 Roadster, at Monterey Car Week in California in August 2019. Visually, the car has a unique green livery (grey and blue optional) with orange accents commemorating the motorsport achievements of the brand. The car wears #11 decals and shares its engine with the winning Huracán GT3 EVO race car.

== Production ==
The Huracán's chassis is assembled by Lamborghini's parent company Audi in Neckarsulm, Germany. It is transported to the Lamborghini headquarters in Sant'Agata Bolognese, Italy, where the final assembly occurs.

Within the first month of the Huracán LP 610-4 preview period, 700 orders of the vehicle were obtained. Before the official launch, Lamborghini registered more than 1,000 orders of the Huracán LP 610–4.

Production numbers

Year	Total	610-4 Coupé	610-4 Spyder	580-2 Coupé	580-2 Spyder	610-4 Avio	640-4 Performante
2013	76	76	-	-	-	-	-
2014	1,540	1,540	-	-	-	-	-
2015	2,628	-	-	-	-	-	-
2016	2,419	-	-	-	-	-	-
2017	2,699	-	-	-	-	250	-
2018	2,790	-	-	-	-	-	-
2019	2,426	-	-	-	-	-	-
2020	2,010	-	-	-	-	-	-
2021	2,435	-	-	-	-	-	-
2022	3,443	-	-	-	-	-	-
2023	3,800						
2024	3,605						
2025	10						

== Motorsport ==
=== Huracán LP 620-2 Super Trofeo (2014–2019) ===
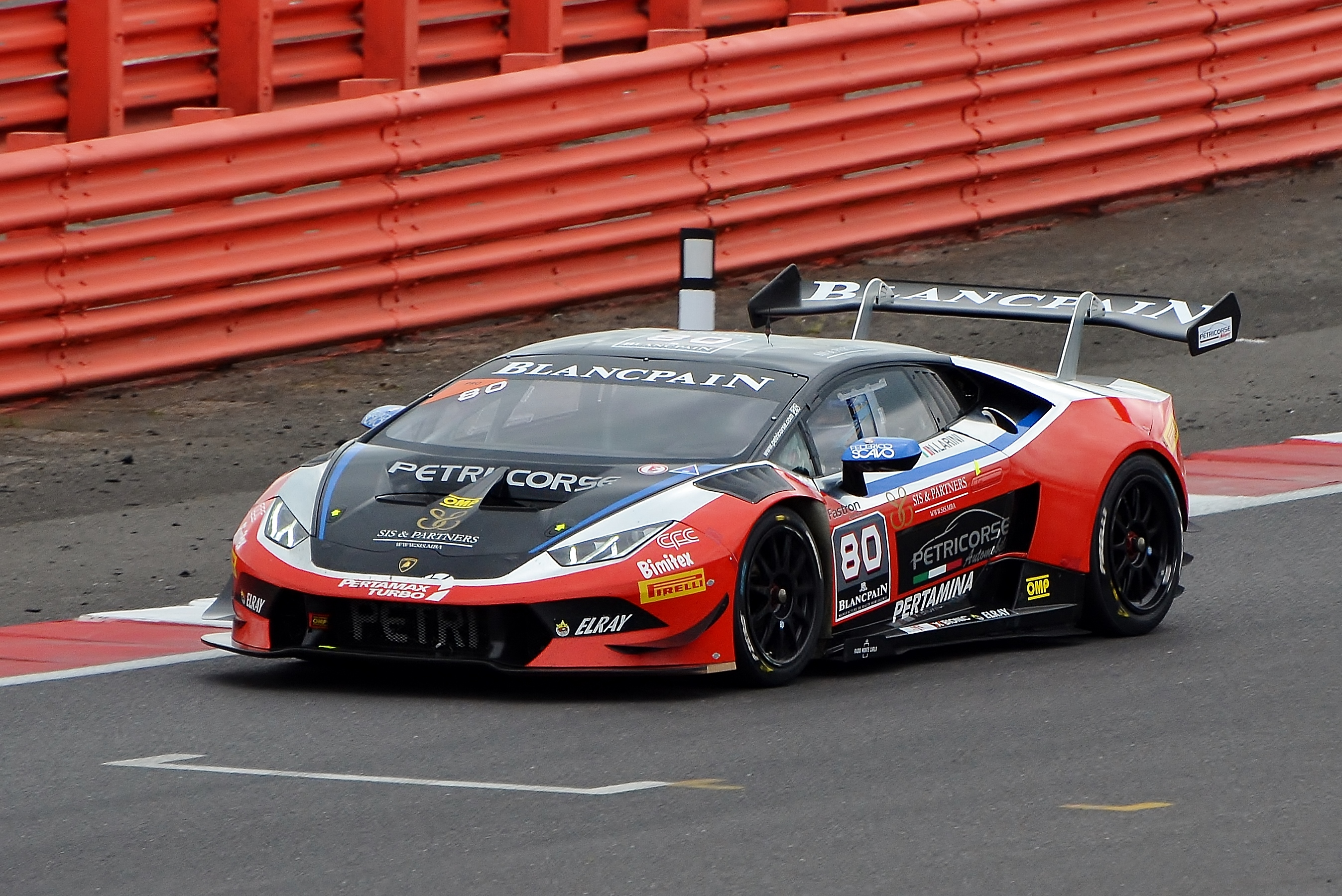
The No. 80 Huracán Super Trofeo of Petri Corse competing at Silverstone Circuit.

The Huracán LP 620-2 Super Trofeo is a racing version of the Huracán for the 2015 Lamborghini Blancpain Super Trofeo Series (Europe, Asia and North America). The 5.2-litre naturally aspirated V10 now generates 456 kW (612 hp; 620 PS) and 570 N⋅m (420 lb⋅ft) of torque.

The vehicle was unveiled at the ACI Vallelunga Circuit.

=== Huracán LP 620-2 Super Trofeo EVO (2019–present) ===
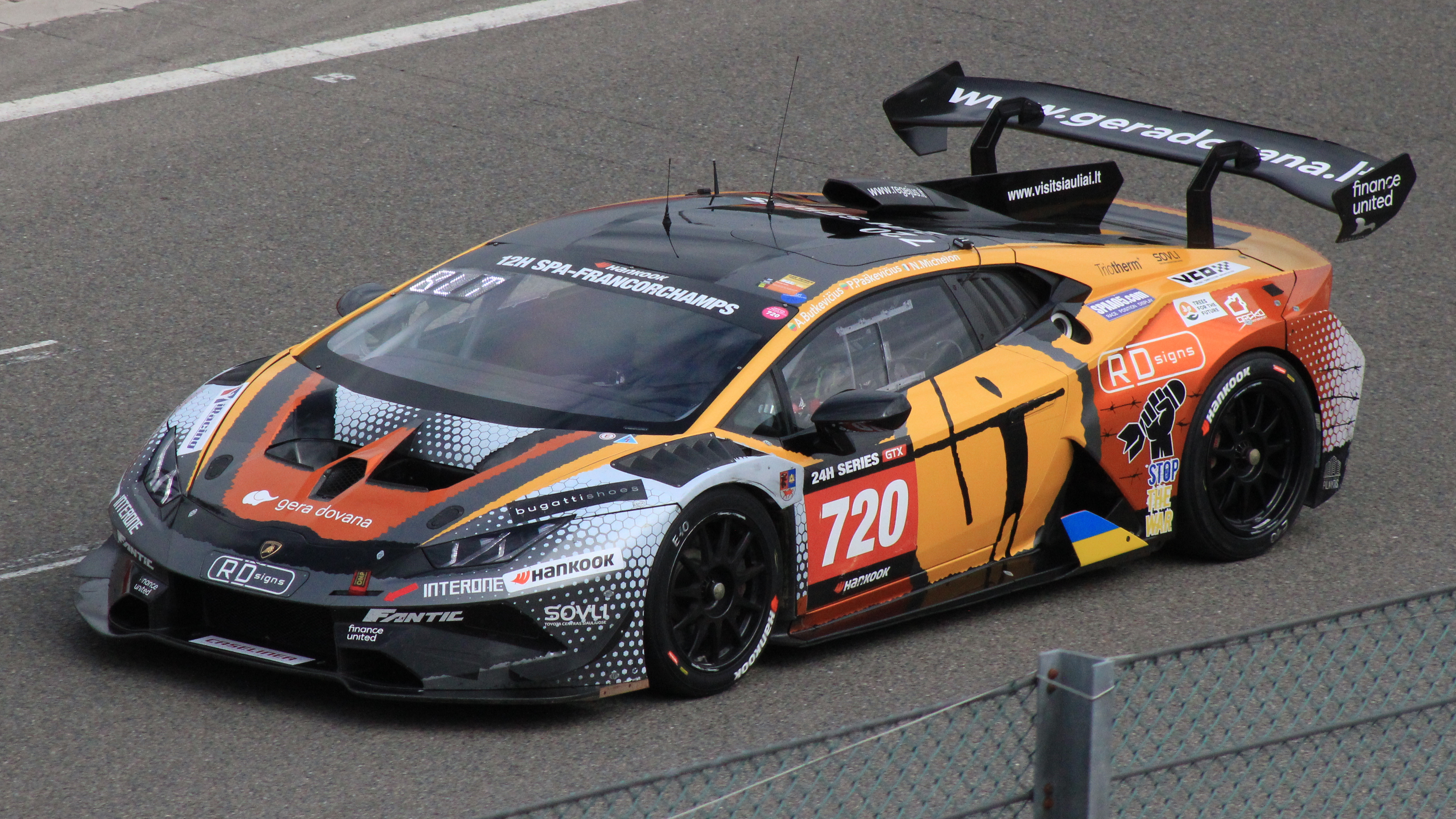
The No. 720 Huracán Super Trofeo EVO of RD Signs - Siauliai competing in the 2022 12 Hours of Spa-Francorchamps.

The Huracán LP 620-2 Super Trofeo EVO is the successor to the Huracán LP 620-2 Super Trofeo. The 5.2-litre naturally aspirated V10 has the same power and torque, respectively 456 kW (612 hp; 620 PS) and 570 N⋅m (420 lb⋅ft) of torque.

==== Huracán Super Trofeo EVO Collector's Edition ====
The Huracán Super Trofeo EVO Collector's Edition is a limited-run version of the Huracán Super Trofeo EVO. The unique colour theme is done so in collaboration with Roger DuBuis, a famous watchmaker. The car now generates a little over 463 kW (621 hp; 630 PS) from the 5.2-litre naturally aspirated V10 with torque remaining the same as the standard car. The bodywork was changed with the introduction of a roof scoop and a new roll cage design with the ability to extract a driver out from the top.

=== Huracán LP 620-2 Super Trofeo EVO2 (2022–present) ===
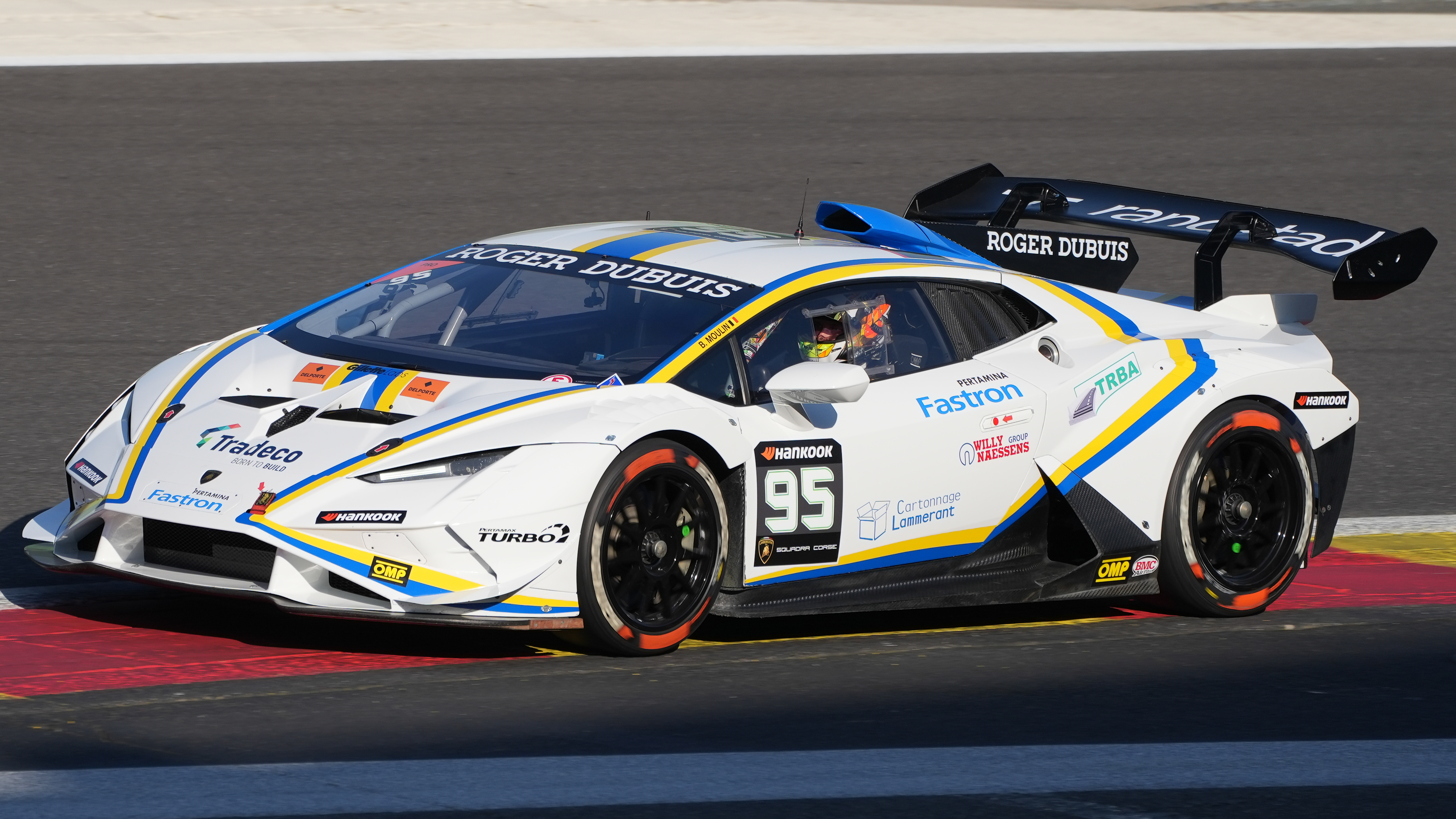
The No. 95 Huracán Super Trofeo EVO2 of VSR competing at Circuit de Spa-Francorchamps.

The Huracán LP 620-2 Super Trofeo EVO2 was announced in May 2021. It features major aerodynamic refinements and more powerful brakes over the Super Trofeo EVO. Its front end has been redesigned with new headlights, air curtains on both sides of the bumper, and a reshaped splitter made with carbon fibre. In the rear, the LED lights are thinner and the diffuser is bigger. The rocker panel extensions and some of the aerodynamic elements fitted to the rear end are now made with the lightweight material rather than with plastic. Lamborghini's Squadra Corsa division developed a new braking system in-house featuring bigger brake rotors and redesigned calipers capable of housing larger brake pads. Power and torque does not change however, remaining at 456 kW (612 hp; 620 PS) and 570 N⋅m (420 lb⋅ft) of torque. Teams racing a Super Trofeo EVO will be able to purchase an upgrade kit to bring their car to EVO2 specifications.

=== Huracán GT3 (2015–2019) ===
Introduced in 2015, The Lamborghini Huracán GT3 was developed in collaboration with Dallara. It features the 5.2-litre naturally aspirated V10 engine of the standard car with 388 kW (520 hp; 527 PS) and 510 N⋅m (376 lb⋅ft) of torque and has a weight of 1,230 kg (2,712 lb).

It debuted in the 2015 Blancpain GT Series Endurance Cup race held in Monza and secured an impressive win in its first competitive outing with Grasser Racing Team. Team Lazarus won the 2016 International GT Open with drivers Thomas Biagi and Fabrizio Crestani. Also, Barwell Motorsport claimed four wins in the 2016 British GT Championship and won the Teams' Championship in 2017, Grasser Racing Team won a race at the 2016 ADAC GT Masters, and Paul Miller Racing won a race in the GTD class at 2016 Michelin GT Challenge at VIR.

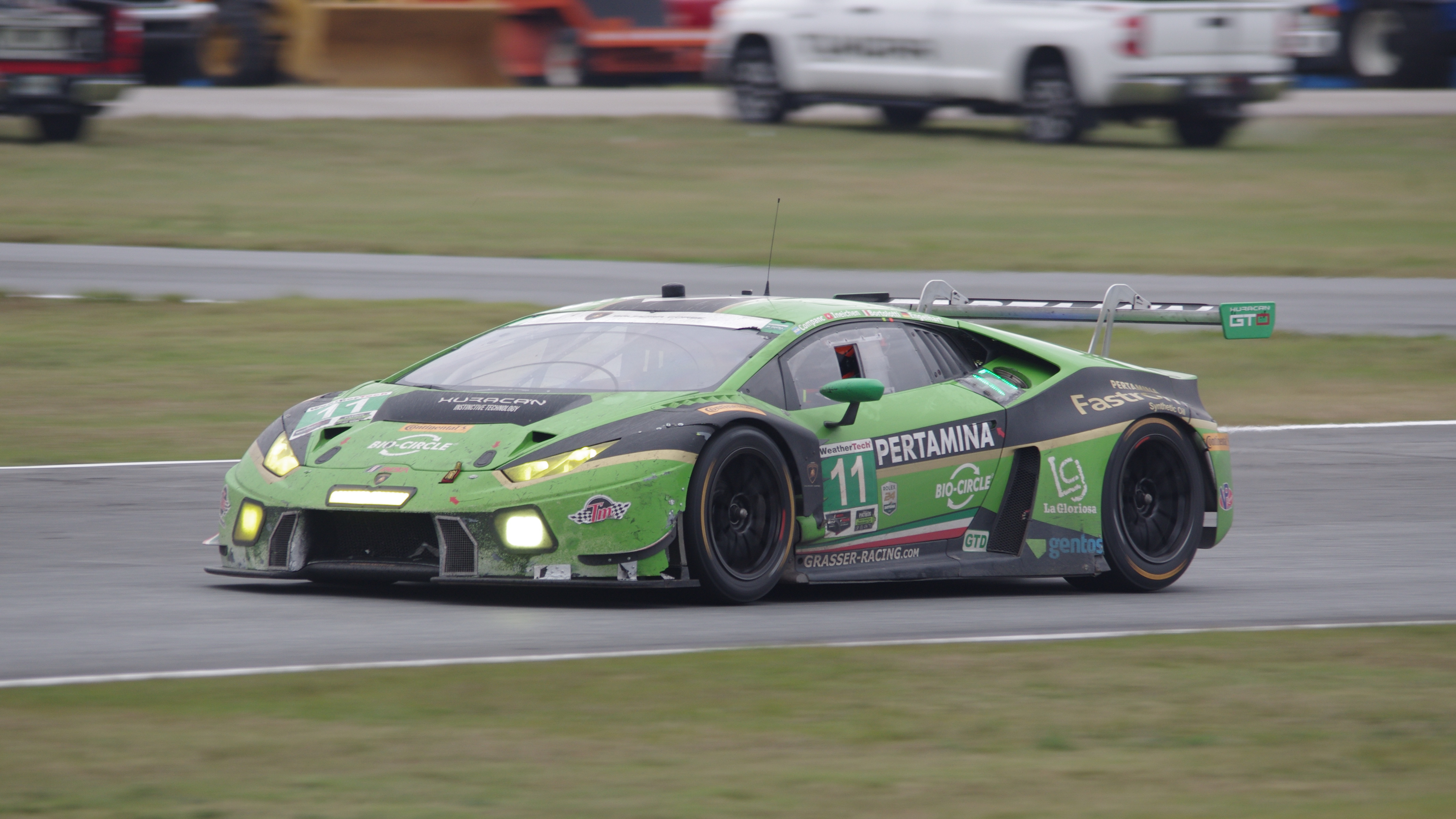
The No. 11 Huracán GT3 of GRT Grasser Racing Team during the 2017 24 Hours of Daytona.

The 2017 Blancpain GT Series was also won by Grasser Racing Team with factory drivers Andrea Caldarelli, Mirko Bortolotti and Christian Engelhart. The #63 Huracán GT3 driven by them took overall victories in the Endurance Cup races at Monza and Silverstone and a Sprint Cup race held at Brands Hatch. FFF Racing Team won the 2018 Blancpain GT Series Asia with Martin Kodrić and Dennis Lind.

On 28 January 2018 on the first race of the 2018 WeatherTech SportsCar Championship, the No. 11 Lamborghini Huracán GT3 of Grasser Racing Team finished first at the 2018 24 Hours of Daytona in the GTD class. It was the first time that Lamborghini has won a 24-hour race in history. The No. 48 Huracán of Paul Miller Racing went on to win the drivers, teams, and manufacturers championships for Lamborghini.

=== Huracán GT3 Evo (2019–2022) ===
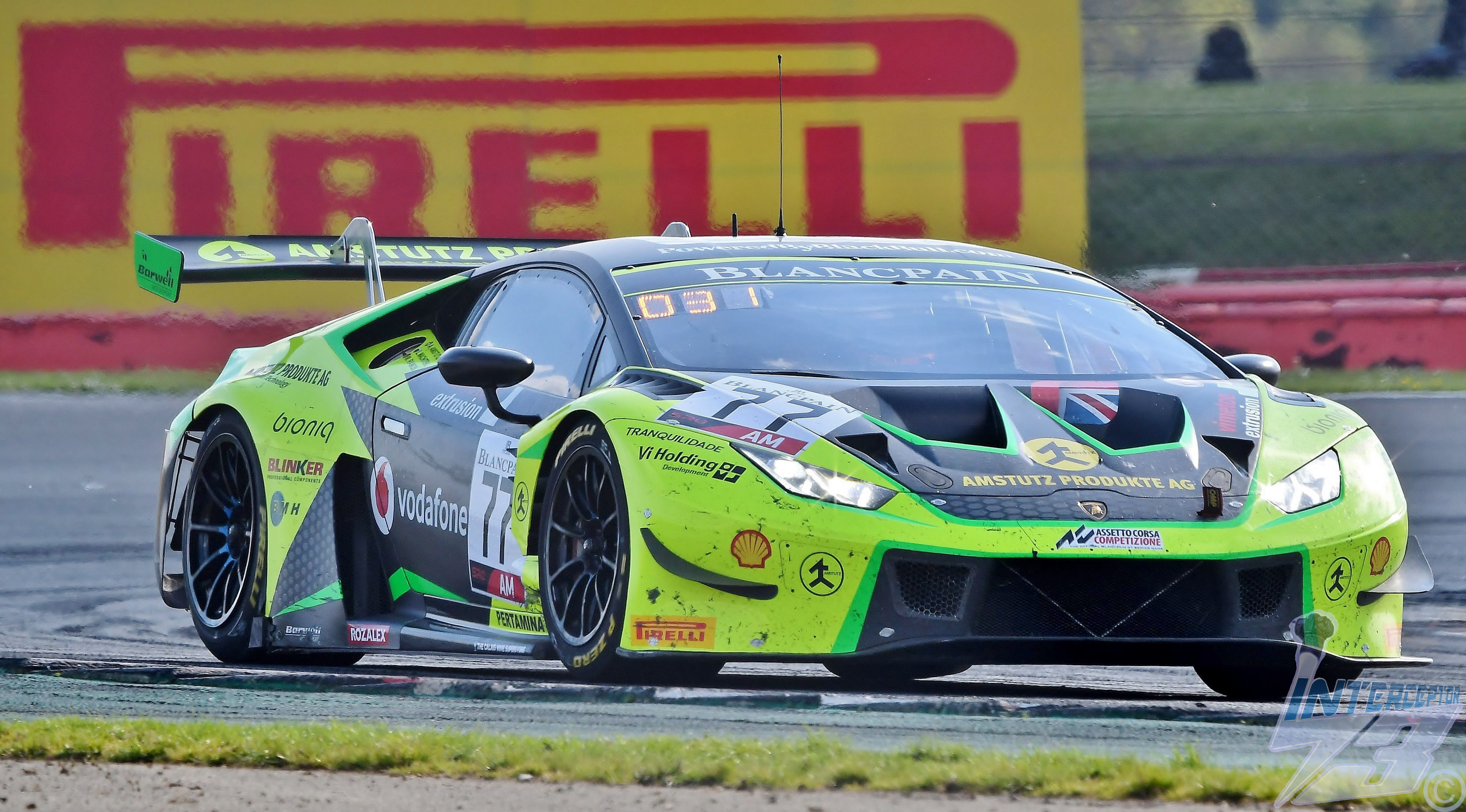
The No. 77 Barwell Motorsport Huracán GT3 Evo competing in the 2019 3 Hours of Silverstone.

The Huracán GT3 Evo is the successor to the Huracán GT3. It features the upgraded 5.2-litre naturally aspirated V10 engine, now with 433 kW (580 hp; 588 PS) and 488 N⋅m (360 lb⋅ft) of torque and has a slightly reduced weight of 1,229.4 kg (2,710 lb).

It made its racing debut in the 2019 24 Hours of Daytona, the opening round of the 2019 WeatherTech SportsCar Championship, where it took the GTD class victory for a second time with Grasser Racing Team. The #11 Huracán GT3 Evo was driven by Mirko Bortolotti, Rik Breukers, Christian Engelhart and Rolf Ineichen. The same car also won the GTD class in the 2019 12 Hours of Sebring, which was the second race of the 2019 WeatherTech SportsCar Championship, while another Huracán GT3 Evo from Magnus Racing took second place. In the 11th round at Laguna Seca, the #48 Huracán GT3 Evo of Paul Miller Racing took victory in the GTD class.

FFF Racing Team won the overall 2019 Blancpain GT Series Championship with support from Lamborghini Squadra Corse, with drivers Andrea Caldarelli and Marco Mapelli securing Lamborghini's second overall championship in the series in three seasons.

=== Huracán GT3 Evo 2 (2023–present) ===
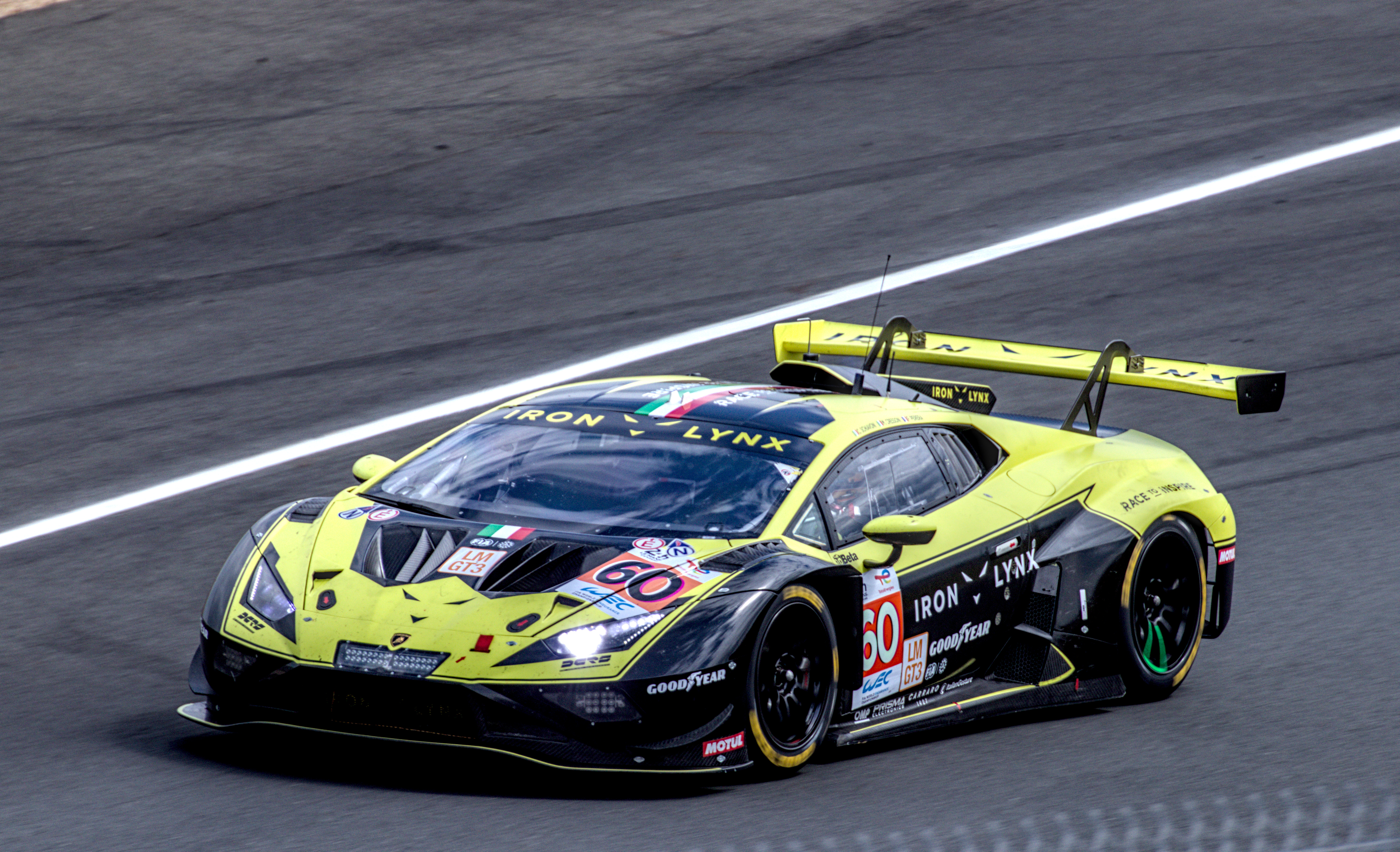
The No. 60 Huracán GT3 Evo 2 of Iron Lynx during the 2024 24 Hours of Le Mans.

In 2022 Lamborghini unveiled the Huracán GT3 Evo 2, which could be purchased as a new car or as an upgrade kit for the previous generation Huracán GT3. The GT3 Evo 2 takes styling cues from the Huracán STO. It features a new intake system and aerodynamic package.

It made its competition debut at the 2023 24 Hours of Daytona, where the Iron Lynx entered #63 Huracán GT3 Evo 2 finished 4th in the GTD Pro class, driven by Lamborghini factory drivers Andrea Caldarelli, Mirko Bortolotti, Jordan Pepper and Romain Grosjean.

The Huracán GT3 Evo 2 also participated in Lamborghini's debut season in the 2024 FIA World Endurance Championship, competing in the LMGT3 class. Two cars were fielded, one by Iron Lynx and another by the all-female Iron Dames team. The season marked Lamborghini's first entry to the LMGT3 category, which replaced the previous GTE-Am class. Although it was a challenging season overall, the Iron Lynx #19 managed to secure a podium finish in class at Spa. The Iron Dames team achieved two pole positions, including a 4th-place finish in LMGT3 (32nd overall) at the 24 Hours of Le Mans.

The new Huracán GT3 Evo 2 had an impressive outing in the 2023 DTM season, where factory driver Mirko Bortolotti, racing for SSR Performance, narrowly missed the championship after securing second place in the drivers' standings, marking Lamborghini's most successful DTM season with five victories since the manufacturer has entered DTM in 2021. Lamborghini's DTM presence expanded from one team with two cars to five cars across two teams in 2023, fielded by SSR Performance and Grasser Racing Team. The next season, Mirko Bortolotti was crowned the 2024 DTM champion after finishing second to Luca Engstler in the season finale at Hockenheim. Bortolotti, driving for SSR Performance, secured the drivers' title for Lamborghini, their first in DTM. For the first time in 31 years, an Italian driver with an Italian brand has won the DTM since Nicola Larini in 1994 with Alfa Romeo.

In the 2024 24 Hours of Spa, a new all-time GT3 lap record for Spa-Francorchamps was set by factory driver Franck Perera, driving for Grasser Racing Team, clocking a lap time of 2:13.718 during the Superpole session and claiming the pole position for the centenary edition of the race. The #163 crew would ultimately finish the race in 5th position overall, completing 478 laps. The next year, on 29 June 2025, Grasser Racing Team achieved a historic milestone with the Huracán GT3 Evo 2 by securing Lamborghini’s first-ever victory in the 24 Hours of Spa. This victory marked the first overall race win for Lamborghini in a major 24 hour race and also made Lamborghini the 20th different manufacturer to win the 24 Hours of Spa.

=== Huracán Super Trofeo GT2 (2021–present) ===
The Huracán Super Trofeo GT2 was first announced in 2020, making the Super Trofeo eligible for GT2 competition.

Teams who already owned a Huracán Super Trofeo could purchase a kit to convert their car into the GT2 version, allowing for teams to compete in both the Super Trofeo series and the GT2 series using the same chassis. This can be done with all three generations of the Super Trofeo.

== Records and controversy ==
=== Nürburgring Nordschleife lap time ===
In October 2016, a prototype of the Huracán Performante set a lap time of 6:52.01 on the Nürburgring Nordschleife, with Marco Mapelli behind the wheel, making it one of the world's fastest production cars around the track. This lap was also made on Marco Mapelli's first attempt. However, some critics have stated complaints around the car's lap time, from the official video being sped up to make the lap believable, to the speeds displayed in the video being false or that it did not use road tires. Lamborghini countered these doubts by sharing telemetry data, and claiming that the car used Pirelli P Zero Trofeo R tires, which were also specified for customer cars. It attributed the record to its Aerodinamica Lamborghini Attiva (ALA) active aerodynamic system Road & Track.

Máté Petrány of Road & Track had met with lead engineer of Lamborghini, Maurizio Reggiani, to ask about the lap. It was then revealed by Reggiani that the Performante's active aerodynamic system called Aerodinamica Lamborghini Attiva gives the car the greatest improvement in lap time. An important issue is the spoilers snapping into their lowest-drag setting when the Performante is aimed forward, which results in the removal of acceleration impediment that big aero causes. The Huracán Performante's lap time was beaten by the Porsche 991 GT2 RS which set a lap time of 6:47.3 in September 2017.

=== Death of Diogo Jota and André Silva ===
A tyre blowout on a Lamborghini Huracán caused the death of Portuguese footballer Diogo Jota and his younger brother André Silva.
