= Mike Nappa =

American author, editor, agent (born 1963)

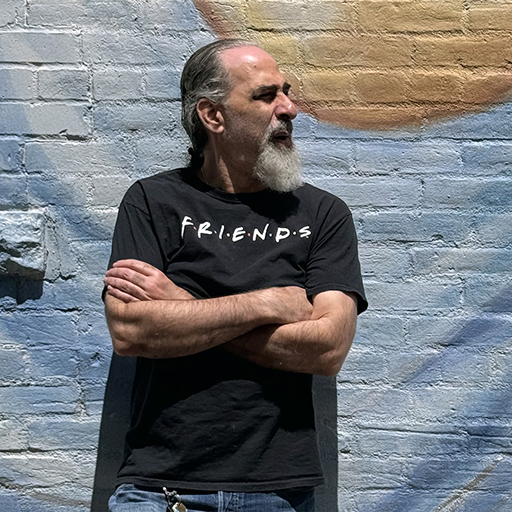
- Born: December 10, 1963 (age 62); Norman, Oklahoma, U.S.
- Occupations: Author, editor, literary agent
- Writing career
- Genres: non-fiction, theology, writing resources, church resources, children's literature, Christian fiction
- Notable works: VeggieTales Super Comics, God in Slow Motion, Johnny Grav & The Visioneer, 77 Reasons Why Your Book Was Rejected
- Website: nappaland.com

Mike Nappa (born December 10, 1963) is an Arab-American author and an entertainment journalist for the e-magazine, NerdFans.com (formerly PopFam.com).

== Biography ==
Nappa was born in Norman, Oklahoma. He started his career as a youth pastor, and then transitioned to writing church resources at Group Publishing in Colorado. He eventually joined Group as a book acquisitions editor and remained active as an author. In 1995, Nappa left Group Publishing to start his own company, Nappaland Communications Inc., which became the parent company for Nappaland Literary Agency and the long-running e-magazine, PopFam.com., which rebranded to NerdFans in 2024. Since then he has published over 60 books which have collectively sold more than a million copies worldwide. He has also served as a fiction acquisitions editor for Barbour Publishing, as a general acquisitions editor (fiction and non-fiction) for David C. Cook publishers, as Editor in Chief of the short-lived Destination Magazine (published by the now-defunct Private Escapes Luxury Destination Clubs), and as Publications Director for Blue Margin Inc.

Although he published several suspense novels under the pen name "Sharon Carter Rogers", it was not until 2016 that Nappa began publishing adult fiction under his own name.
