= Napa leather =

Type of full-grained leather

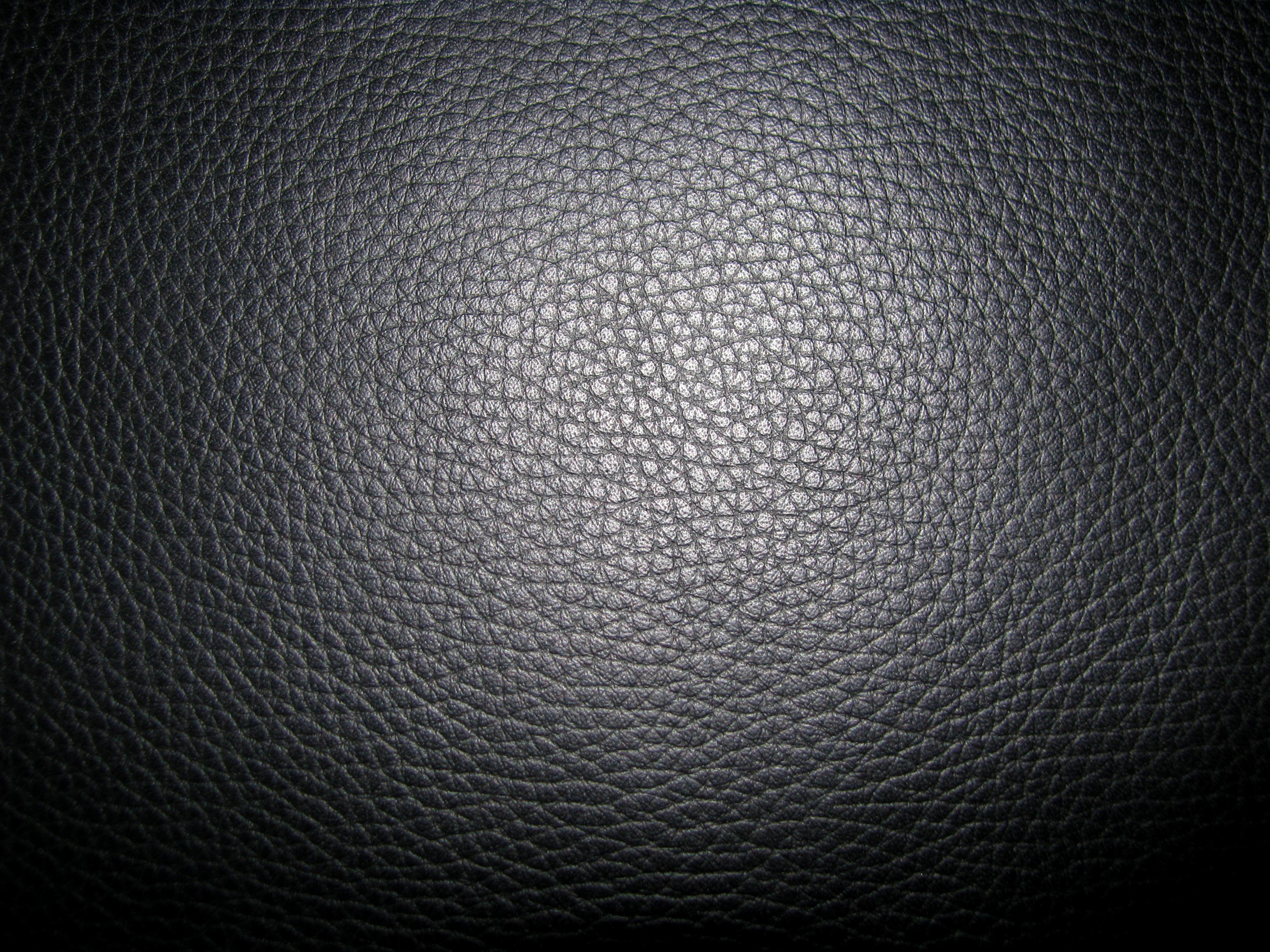

Napa leather (also called nappa leather) is a leather noted for its soft feel, derived from calves, lambs, and kid goats, which have soft hides. It is a generic term in the leather field and has no distinct test for characterization. It generally refers to a soft leather, used in products such as handbags and car seats.

The leather takes its name from Napa, California, where the process of making napa leather was created by Emanuel Manasse, a German tanner working for The Sawyer Tanning Company. This was marketed as "Nap-a-tan", and was a waterproof shoe leather. However, today the term "nappa leather" refers to a soft leather used for bags, clothing and car seats.
