= Magnetorheological damper =

Damper filled with magnetorheological fluid

A magnetorheological damper or magnetorheological shock absorber is a damper filled with magnetorheological fluid, which is controlled by a magnetic field, usually using an electromagnet. This allows the damping characteristics of the shock absorber to be continuously controlled by varying the power of the electromagnet. Fluid viscosity increases within the damper as electromagnet intensity increases. This type of shock absorber has several applications, most notably in semi-active vehicle suspensions which may adapt to road conditions, as they are monitored through sensors in the vehicle, and in prosthetic limbs.

== History ==
The technology was originally developed by General Motors Delphi Automotive Division based in the US and then developed further by BeijingWest Industries in China after BeijingWest Industries bought the technology from General Motors. BeijingWest Industries has subsequently introduced improvements including a redesigned ECU and the introduction of a dual coil system. The first car to use the technology was the 2002.5 Cadillac Seville STS, and the first sports car to use the technology was the 2003 C5 Corvette.

== Control ==
A magnetorheological damper is controlled by algorithms specifically designed for the purpose. There are plenty of alternatives, such as skyhook or groundhook algorithms. The idea of the algorithms is to control the yield point shear stress of the magnetorheological fluid with electric current. When the fluid is in the presence of an applied magnetic field, the suspended metal particles align according to the field lines. Viscosity of the fluid increases according to the intensity of the magnetic field. When this occurs at the right instant, the properties of the damper change helps in attenuating an undesired shock or vibration. The relative efficacy of magnetorheological dampers to active and passive control strategies is usually comparable.

== Uses ==
Many applications have been proposed using magnetorheological (MR) dampers. While vehicle applications are the most common use of MR dampers, useful medical applications have risen as well, including implants and rehabilitation methods. Since MR dampers are not yet perfect, they are limited in terms of application. Disadvantages do exist when using a large scale MR damper, for example, particle settling within the carrier fluid may occur that inhibits some possible application.

These types of systems are available from OEMs for several vehicles, including the Acura MDX, Audi TT and R8, Buick Lucerne, Cadillac ATS, CTS-V, DTS, XLR, SRX, STS, Chevrolet Corvette, Camaro ZL1, Ferrari 458 Italia, 599GTB, F12 Berlinetta, Mustang Mach-E, Shelby GT 350, Holden HSV E-Series, and Lamborghini Huracán. These systems were produced by the Delphi Corporation and now by BWI Group under the proprietary name MagneRide.

MillenWorks has also included them in several military vehicles including the MillenWorks Light Utility Vehicle, and in retrofits to the US Army Stryker and HMMWV for testing by TARDEC.

MRF-based dampers are excellent candidates for stability augmentation of the lead-lag (in-plane bending) mode of rotor blades in helicopters. MRF-based squeeze film dampers are being designed for use in the rotary wing industry to isolate vibrations from the aircraft structure and crew.

== See also ==
- Smart fluid – Fluid whose properties can be changed by applying an electric or magnetic field
- Magnetorheological fluid – Smart fluid whose viscosity increases in a magnetic field
- Ferrofluid – Liquid that is attracted by poles of a magnet
- Electrorheological fluid – Type of chemical suspension
- Rheology – Study of the flow of matter, primarily in a fluid state
- Rheometry – Experimental techniques used to study fluid flow (rheology)
