= MagneRide =

Adaptive suspension system

MagneRide is an automotive adaptive suspension with magnetorheological damper system developed by the Delphi Automotive corporation, that uses magnetically controlled dampers, or shock absorbers, for a highly adaptive ride. As opposed to traditional suspension systems, MagneRide has no mechanical valves or even small moving parts that can wear. This system consists of monotube dampers, one on each corner of the vehicle, a sensor set, and an ECU (electronic control unit) to maintain the system.

== Background ==
The dampers are filled with magnetorheological fluid, a mixture of easily magnetized iron particles in a synthetic hydrocarbon oil. In each of the monotube dampers is a piston containing two electromagnetic coils and two small fluid passages through the piston. The electromagnets are able to create a variable magnetic field across the fluid passages. When the magnets are off, the fluid travels through the passages freely. When the magnets are turned on, the iron particles in the fluid create a fibrous structure through the passages in the same direction as the magnetic field. The strength of the bonds between the magnetized iron particles causes the effective viscosity of the fluid to increase resulting in a stiffer suspension. Altering the strength of the current results in an instantaneous change in force of the piston. If the sensors sense any body roll, they communicate the information to the ECU. The ECU will compensate for this by changing the strength of the current to the appropriate dampers.

== History ==
The first generation was created by Delphi Corporation during a period when it was a subsidiary of General Motors (GM). Originally licensed only to General Motors vehicles, it debuted on the 2002.5 Cadillac Seville STS. The first sports car to use the technology was the 2003 C5 Corvette. Delphi would later license the technology to other manufacturers such as Ferrari and Audi. BeijingWest Industries, BWI, acquired MagneRide IP in 2009.

== Differentiating features ==
- Low-velocity damping control
- Ability to "draw" force-velocity curve
- Fast response

== Improvements ==
Generation II MagneRide continued to use a single electromagnetic coil inside the damper piston. Changes from the previous generation include uprated seals and bearings to extend its application to heavier cars and SUV's. The most notable improvements in the new system are the ECU and coils. A smaller, lighter, more capable ECU debuted with GenII

The legislative requirement for lead-free ECU's caused BWI to redesign their control unit for the third generation. Because they could not use lead, BWI designed their new ECU from scratch. The new and improved ECU has three times the computing capacity as the previous edition as well as ten times more memory. It also has greater tuneability.

=== Dual coils ===
The third generation introduced a second electromagnetic coil in the piston of each damper, improving turn-off response. With the single electromagnetic coil, there was a small delay from when the ECU turned off the current to when the damper lost its magnetic field. This was caused by a temporary electric current, or eddy current, in the electromagnet. BWI greatly reduced this delay with its dual coil system. The two coils are wound in opposite directions to each other, cancelling out the eddy currents. The dual coil system effectively eliminated the delay, causing a quicker responding suspension system.

== Applications ==
MagneRide was first used by General Motors in the Cadillac Seville STS (2002.5) sedan, first used in a sports car in the 2003 C5 Corvette, and is now used as a standard suspension or an option in many models for Cadillac, Buick, Chevrolet, and other GM vehicles. It can also be found on some Holden Special Vehicles (HSV), Ferrari, Lamborghini, Ford and Audi vehicles.

Specific Applications:

- Acura MDX Sport Package
- Acura ZDX
- Acura NSX
- Audi TT (magnetic ride)
- Audi S3 (magnetic ride)
- Audi R8 (magnetic ride)
- Buick Lucerne: CXS trim; Lucerne Super
- Chevrolet Camaro: Standard equipment on ZL1 trim (2012–2024) and optional on SS trim (2016–2024)
- Chevrolet Corvette C5: Standard equipment on 2003 50th anniversary model, optional on 2003-2004 model years
- Chevrolet Corvette C6: optional in coupe trim starting in 2005 model year and in hardtop (Z06) trim starting in 2012 model year; standard equipment in ZR1.
- Chevrolet Corvette C7: Optional with Z51 package, standard on Z06 and ZR1
- Chevrolet Corvette C8: Optional with Z51 package, standard on Z06
- Chevrolet SS (2015-2017)
- Cadillac XLR and Cadillac XLR-V (2004–2009) standard on all models
- Cadillac ATS and Cadillac ATS-V (2013–): standard with premium/ premium performance trim packages
- Cadillac Celestiq (2023-): standard along with air suspension and Active Roll Control
- Cadillac CT4-V (2020–): standard on CT4-V
- Cadillac CT5-V (2020–): fourth generation Magnetic Ride Control standard on CT5-V
- Cadillac CTS and Cadillac CTS-V (2009–) (Magnetic Ride Control)
- Cadillac CT6 (2016–): standard on Platinum, optional on other models except PHEV
- Cadillac Escalade (2008-): standard
- Cadillac SRX (2004–09): standard with Performance or Premium option package.
- Cadillac DTS (2006–11): standard with Performance or Premium option package.
- Cadillac STS (2005–11): standard with Northstar V8 and 1SG option package.
- Cadillac Seville STS (2002–03): Debut application for MagneRide, replacing Continuously Variable Road-Sensing Suspension (CVRSS).
- Deepal L06
- GMC Sierra (Denali Trim) (2015-)
- GMC Yukon and Yukon XL (LTZ Trim) (2015-)
- Ferrari 599
- Ferrari F12berlinetta
- Ferrari California
- Ferrari FF
- Ferrari 458 Italia
- Ferrari La Ferrari
- Ferrari Roma
- Ford Mustang Ecoboost (2018–): Optional in Performance Package (2018–2019); Standard in Handling Package, which requires High Performance Package (2020–)
- Ford Mustang GT (2018–): Optional in Performance Package, Standard in Performance Package Level 2
- Ford Mustang Bullitt (2019–2020): Optional
- Ford Mustang Shelby GT350 (2015–2020) and GT500 (2020–2022): Standard
- Ford Mustang Dark Horse (2024–): Standard
- Ford Mustang Mach-E: GT Performance Edition (2021–2023), GT (2024–), Rally (2023–)
- HSV Senator
- HSV GTS
- HSV Grange
- HSV W427
- Land Rover Discovery Sport
- Lamborghini Aventador
- Lamborghini Huracán
- Land Rover Range Rover Evoque
- Polestar 5
