= Magnetic fluid =

Magnetic fluid may refer to:

- Magnetorheological fluid, a type of smart fluid whose viscosity increases in a magnetic field
- Ferrofluid, a dark liquid that is attracted to the poles of a magnet
- Animal magnetism, a posited invisible natural force possessed by all living things
