= De Carbon =

The de Carbon hydraulic shock absorber was invented in 1953, by Christian Bourcier de Carbon. The De Carbon Company was also established in 1953; however, in 1997, Delphi gained control of the entire company. When BeijingWest Industries acquired the brakes and suspensions business of Delphi in 2009, BWI Group acquired the de Carbon brand. Today, the shock absorbers are mainly sold as a key aftermarket brand in European countries.

== Vehicle Applications ==
1996 Chevrolet Impala SS

== Features ==
- Piston rod is hardened by induction and highly refined.
- Various additives are put into the oil in order to give it the qualities that are essential to attain the best performance.
- Will not overheat in severe conditions
- Exterior damages are prevented by the reservoir tube, which protects the cylinder from objects such as: stones, sand etc.
- Improves comfort by reducing friction
