= Smart Water =

Smart Water may refer to:

- SmartWater, a crime deterrent system
- Glaceau Smartwater, a drink by Energy Brands
- Smart fluid, a unique liquid whose properties may be changed under magnetic pressure
