= Rheometry =

Measurement of fluid flow

Rheometry (from Greek ῥέος (rheos) 'stream') generically refers to the experimental techniques used to determine the rheological properties of materials, that is the qualitative and quantitative relationships between stresses and strains and their derivatives. The techniques used are experimental. Rheometry investigates materials in relatively simple flows like steady shear flow, small amplitude oscillatory shear, and extensional flow.

The choice of the adequate experimental technique depends on the rheological property which has to be determined. This can be the steady shear viscosity, the linear viscoelastic properties (complex viscosity respectively elastic modulus), the elongational properties, etc.

For all real materials, the measured property will be a function of the flow conditions during which it is being measured (shear rate, frequency, etc.) even if for some materials this dependence is vanishingly low under given conditions (see Newtonian fluids).

Rheometry is a specific concern for smart fluids such as electrorheological fluids and magnetorheological fluids, as it is the primary method to quantify the useful properties of these materials.

Rheometry is considered useful in the fields of quality control, process control, and industrial process modelling, among others. For some, the techniques, particularly the qualitative rheological trends, can yield the classification of materials based on the main interactions between different possible elementary components and how they qualitatively affect the rheological behavior of the materials. Novel applications of these concepts include measuring cell mechanics in thin layers, especially in drug screening contexts.

== Of non-Newtonian fluids ==
The viscosity of a non-Newtonian fluid is defined by a power law:

$$\eta = \eta_0\dot{\gamma}^{n-1}$$

where η is the viscosity after shear is applied, η_{0} is the initial viscosity, γ is the shear rate, and if

- $n < 1$, the fluid is shear thinning,
- $n > 1$, the fluid is shear thickening,
- $n = 1$, the fluid is Newtonian.

In rheometry, shear forces are applied to non-Newtonian fluids in order to investigate their properties.

=== Shear thinning fluids ===
Due to the shear thinning properties of blood, computational fluid dynamics (CFD) is used to assess the risk of aneurysms. Using High-Resolution solution strategies, the results when using non-Newtonian rheology were found to be negligible.

=== Shear thickening fluids ===
A method for testing the behavior of shear thickening fluids is stochastic rotation dynamics-molecular dynamics (SRD-MD). The colloidal particles of a shear thickening fluid are simulated, and shear is applied. These particles create hydroclusters which exert a drag force resisting flow.

== Small-amplitude oscillatory shear ==
Small amplitude oscillatory shear (SAOS) is a common rheometry technique that measures viscoelastic properties with a rotational rheometer. The sample is oscillated in a continuous cycle, where the amplitude of the oscillation is the maximum applied stress or strain, and the angular frequency is the number of oscillations per second. This is then represented as a sinusoidal wave with the x-axis being time and the y-axis the stress or strain amplitude. Since either strain or stress can be controllably applied, the other variable is what is measured. The ratio of this stress to strain is the complex modulus G*, which is a measure of the material stiffness or resistance to deformation. The viscoelasticity is determined from the sinusoidal wave diagram, since for a totally elastic material, the stress is directly proportional to the strain and therefore the maximum stress occurs when the maximum strain occurs (the sine waves are in phase). For a completely viscous material, the stress is proportional to the strain rate, and the stress and strain sine waves are out of phase by 90 degrees. For a viscoelastic material, the behavior is somewhere between these two extremes. This phase difference can be quantified by the phase angle δ, which can be used to determine the viscous and elastic contributions to the complex modulus G*. The elastic contribution is the storage modulus G', which is equal to G*cosδ, while the viscous contribution is the loss modulus G", which is equal to G*sinδ. The complex modulus can also be considered to have real and imaginary components, which correspond to the storage and loss moduli respectively.

The strength of using this oscillatory shear technique is that by applying different frequencies, the viscoelastic response on different timescales can be probed, and the differences in timescales can also be correlated to changes in behavior at different temperatures. This technique can also be considered non-destructive since testing occurs in the linear viscoelastic regime (LVER), where stress and strain are proportional.

== See also ==
- Continuum mechanics
- Dynamic shear rheometer
- Ferrofluid
- Fluid mechanics
