= Acura MDX =

Mid-size luxury crossover SUV

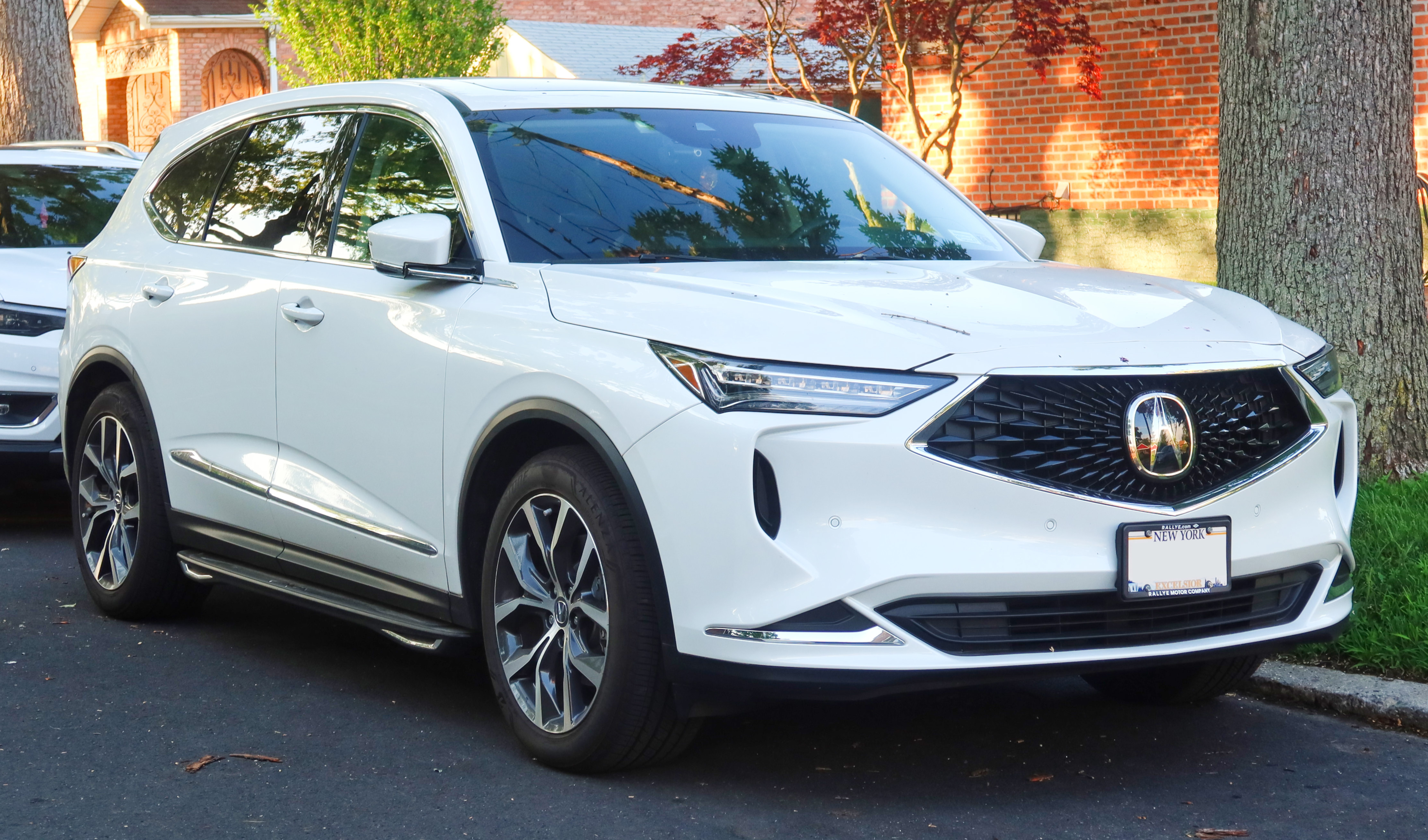
- 2022 Acura MDX Technology (US)

Overview
- Manufacturer: Honda
- Production: 2000–present
- Model years: 2001–2020; 2022–present

Body and chassis
- Class: Mid-size luxury crossover SUV
- Body style: 5-door SUV

Chronology
- Predecessor: Acura SLX

The Acura MDX is a mid-size luxury crossover SUV with three-row seating produced by the Japanese automaker Honda under its luxury Acura division since 2000. The alphanumeric moniker stands for "Multi-Dimensional" luxury. It has ranked as the second-best selling mid-size luxury SUV after the Lexus RX in the U.S.

The MDX was introduced on October 5, 2000 as a 2001 model, replacing the slow-selling U.S.-only body-on-frame SLX, based on the Isuzu Trooper. In Japan, it was made to replace the Honda Horizon (also based on the Trooper) which was discontinued in 1999. In 2003, the vehicle went on sale in Japan and Australia as the Honda MDX; sales with Honda badges ended with the introduction of the second generation three years later.

== First generation (YD1; 2001) ==
First generation
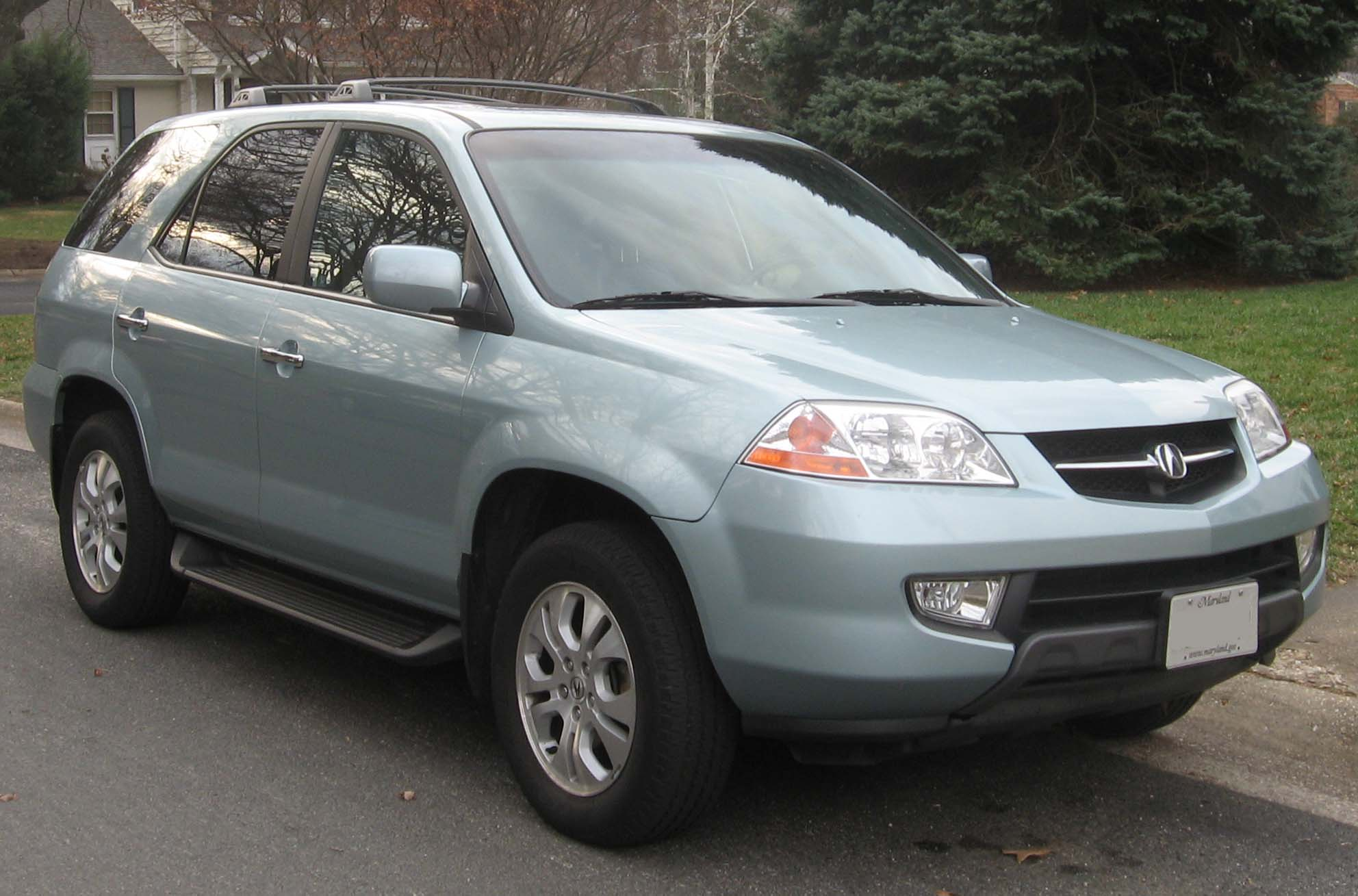
- Pre-facelift Acura MDX

Overview
- Model code: YD1
- Also called: Honda MDX (Australia and Japan)
- Production: 2000–2006 (Acura); 2003–2006 (Honda)
- Model years: 2001–2006
- Assembly: Canada: Alliston, Ontario (HCM)
- Designer: Frank Paluch (engineering: 1998); Catalin Matei (styling: 1998)

Body and chassis
- Layout: Front engine, all-wheel drive
- Related: Honda Pilot

Powertrain
- Engine: 3.5 L J35A3/J35A5 V6
- Transmission: 5-speed automatic

Dimensions
- Wheelbase: 106.3 in (2,700 mm)
- Length: 188.5 in (4,788 mm)
- Width: 77.0 in (1,955 mm)
- Height: Base: 68.7 in (1,745 mm); Touring: 71.3 in (1811 mm)
- Curb weight: 4,451 lb (2,019 kg)

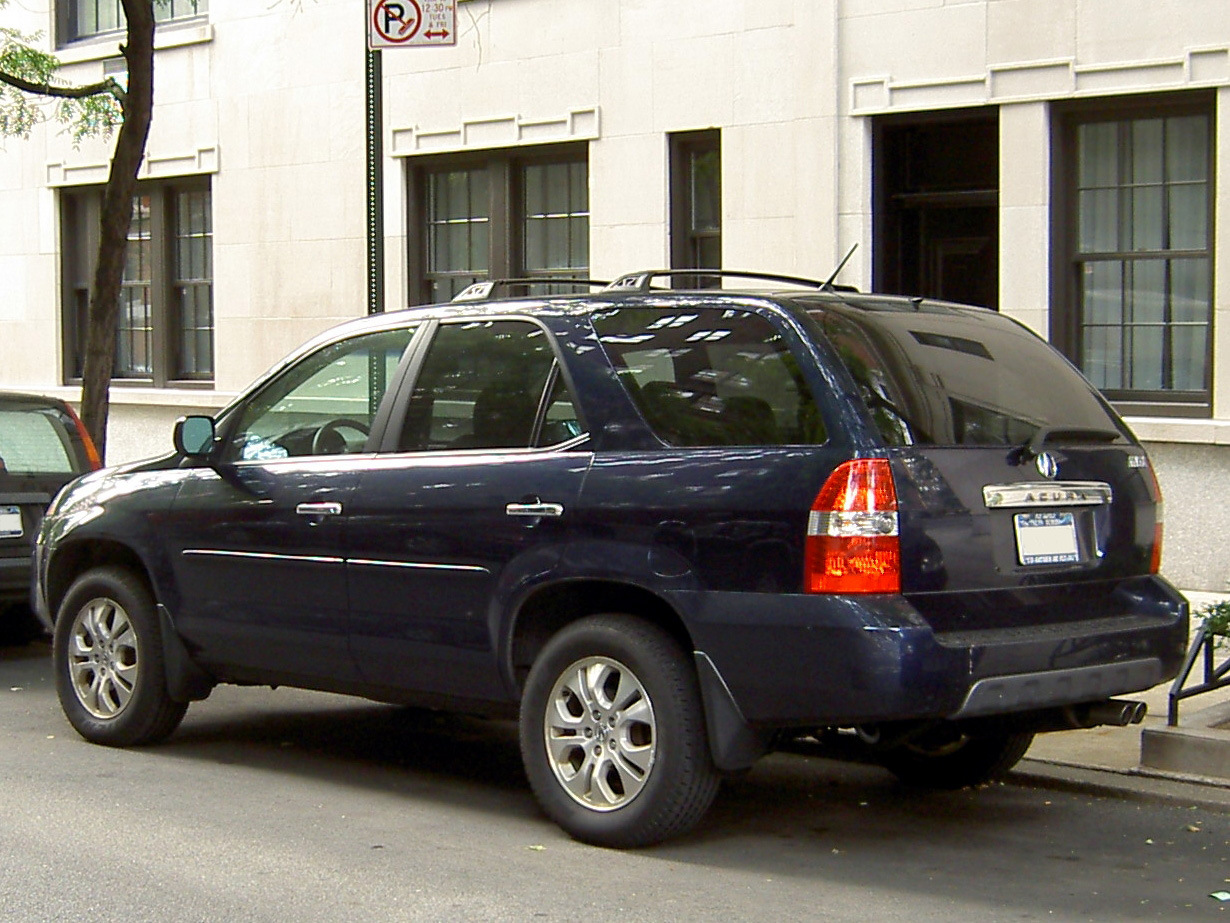
Acura MDX rear view (US)

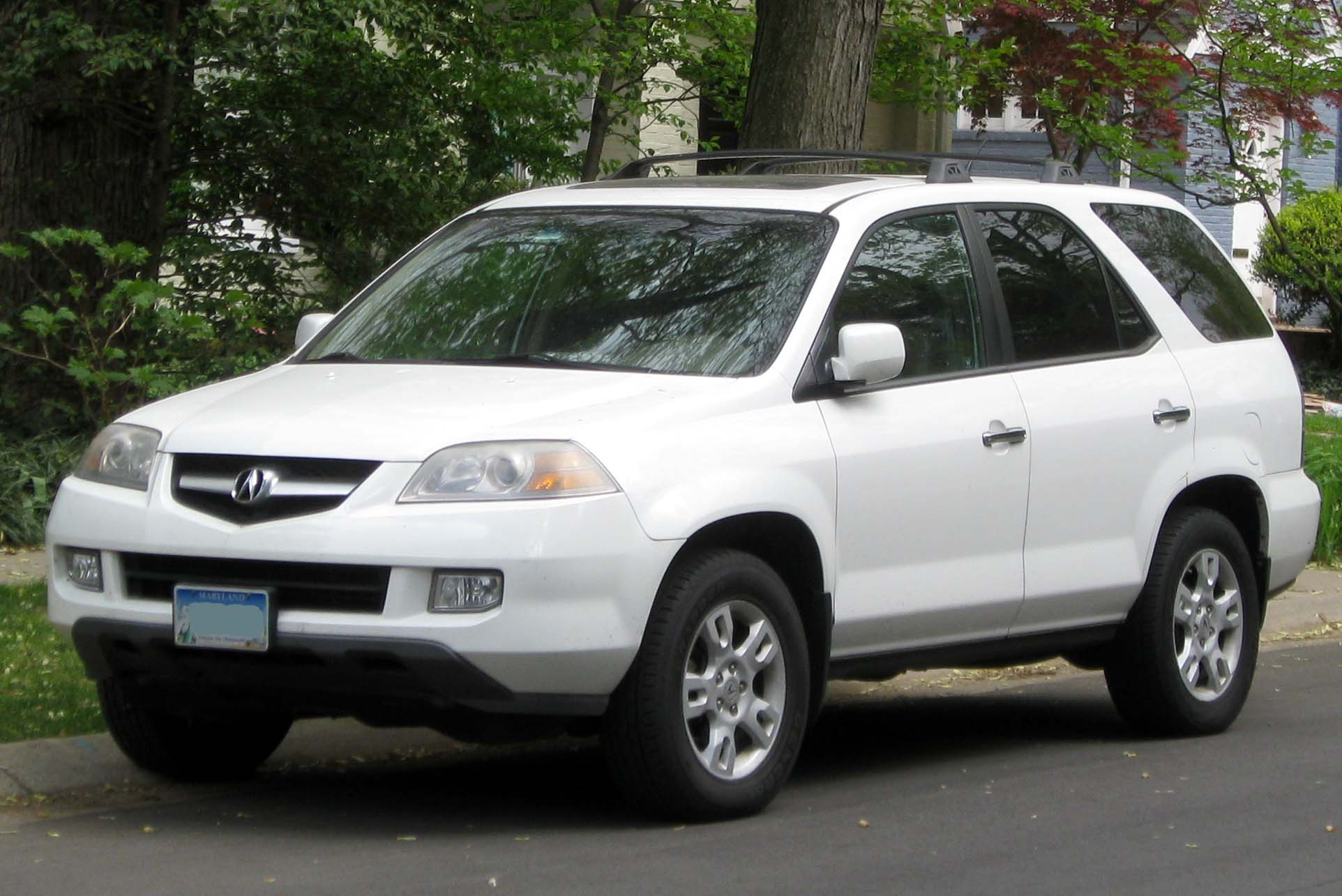
Facelifted Acura MDX (US)

Derived from Honda's Global mid-size platform which underpins cars like the Honda Accord, Acura TL, TSX and Odyssey, it is powered by a J35A3 3.5 L SOHC 24 valve V6 gasoline engine with VTEC. Curb weight is 4,451 lb (2,019 kg), with a 106.3 in (2,700 mm) wheelbase and 8 in (200 mm) of ground clearance. The cargo floor can flip up to provide two additional seats. The vehicle is designed to hold 7 passengers, but the third row seats are small and only seat two, in contrast to the Odyssey and Pilot whose third row holds three passengers.

The vehicle features an automatic four wheel drive system (named VTM-4) that engages during off the line acceleration as well as when wheel slippage is detected. Additionally, the system offers a lock mode which can be activated and operated at low speeds and provides permanent 4WD and the equivalent of a locked rear differential; designed for climbing steep hills and getting out of stuck situations. To reduce drivetrain noise and increase fuel efficiency, the system runs as front wheel drive during normal cruising. The VTM-4 AWD system in the MDX has the same design as the VTM-4 systems found in the Honda Pilot and Honda Ridgeline. It is different than Honda's "RealTime AWD" system in the Honda CR-V and other models in that it can lock and it attempts to predict when traction will be lost and apply power to all four wheels before slippage occurs (by monitoring throttle inputs).

The navigation system and DVD entertainment system (also popular on other Honda/Acura models, such as the CR-V and Odyssey) options were mutually exclusive in the 2002 model. Both could be ordered at the same time since the 2003 model. The navigation option comes with a backup camera since the 2003 model. Since 2005, the navigation system featured information from Zagat about restaurants and other points of interest. The 2003 model was rated as Ultra Low Emission Vehicle. The United States Environmental Protection Agency estimates 23 mpg_{‑US} (10 L/100 km; 28 mpg_{‑imp}) highway and 17 mpg_{‑US} (14 L/100 km; 20 mpg_{‑imp}) city.

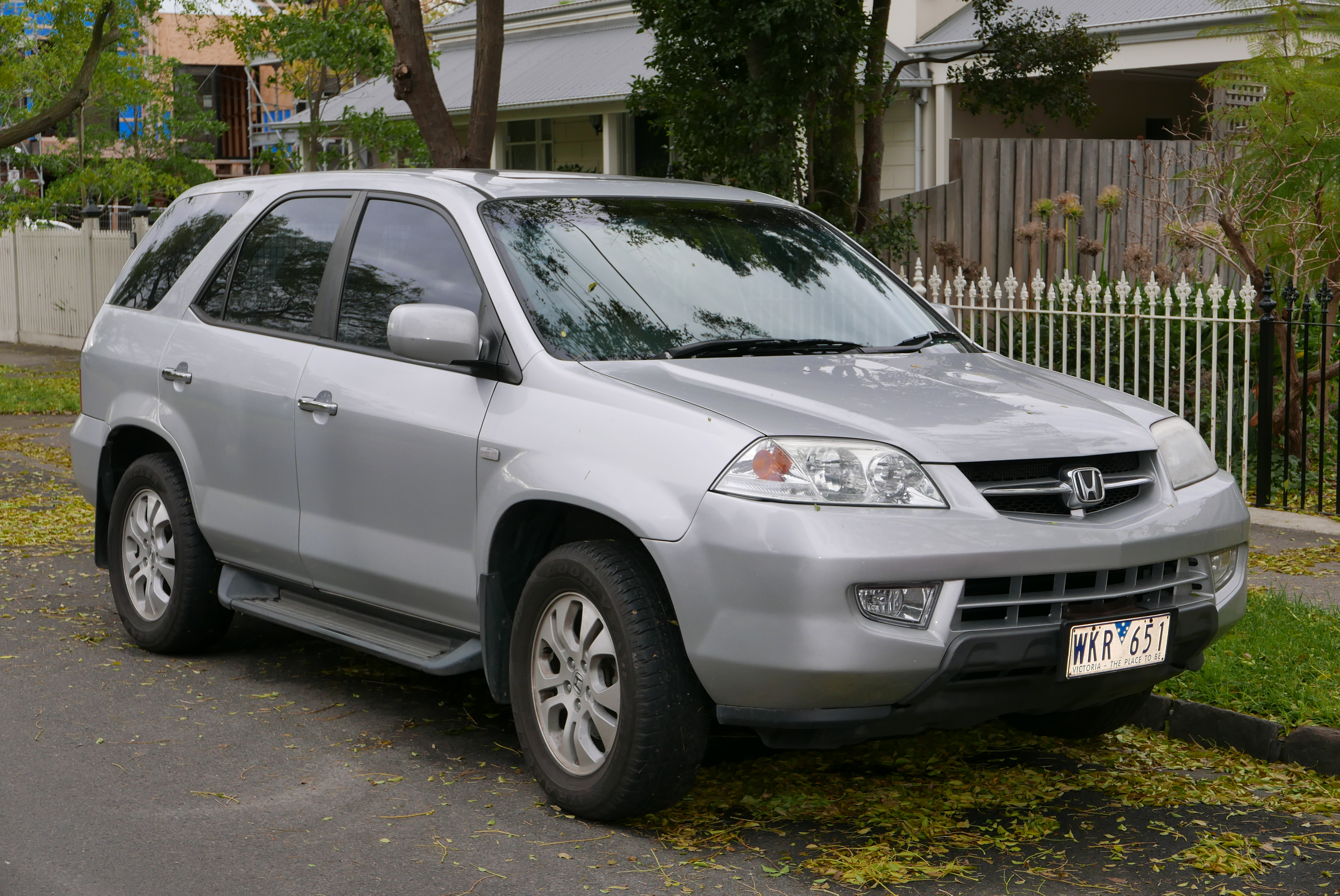
Honda MDX (Australia)

The first two model years' 3.5-liter V6 engine produces 240 hp (179 kW) and 245 lb⋅ft (332 N⋅m) of torque from 3000 to 5000 rpm. For the 2003 model year, the engine was improved to produce 20 hp (15 kW) more power than the earlier models, and the wheel designs were updated. The 2004 through 2006 engine received a modest increase in power and produces 265 hp (198 kW) and 253 lb⋅ft (343 N⋅m). The 2004 model is credited with a top speed of 137 mph, and a 0-60 time of 7.1 seconds. The 2004 model year features dual tail pipes instead of the single pipe in earlier models, side curtain airbags, new head lights and tail lights, and new wheels. Some chrome trimmings on the 2004 model use matte finish to distinguish from the polished shiny finish on earlier models. Little changed for the MDX during 2005 for the 2006 model year with a few minor revisions to the vehicle's chrome and faux wood interior trim which could be available with a dark grey wood (as opposed to reddish wood on earlier models), and also a black dash and steering wheel in tan interiors.

== Second generation (YD2; 2007) ==
Second generation
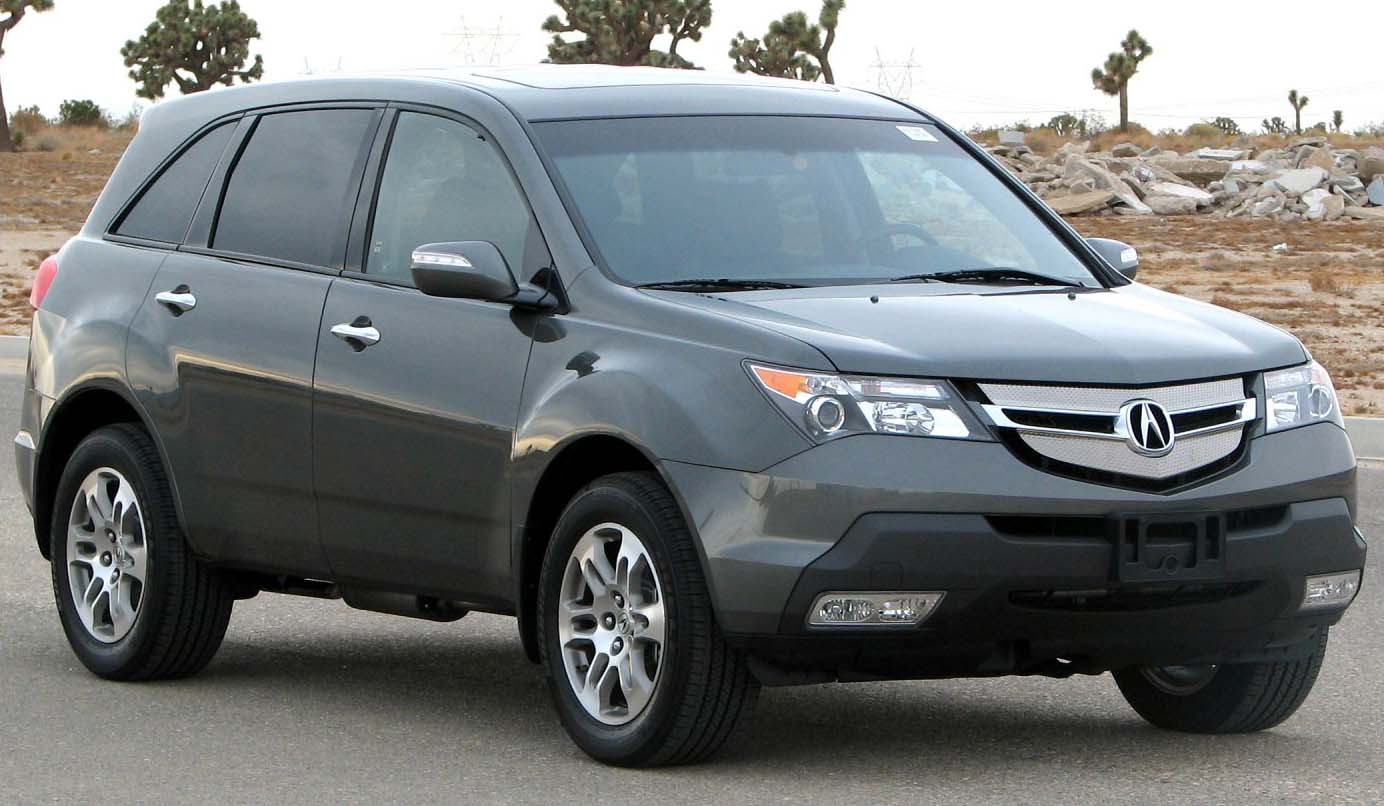
- Pre-facelift Acura MDX

Overview
- Model code: YD2
- Production: September 2006 – 2013
- Model years: 2007–2013
- Assembly: Canada: Alliston, Ontario (HCM)
- Designer: Frank Paluch (engineering: 2004); Ricky Hsu (styling: 2003)

Body and chassis
- Layout: Front engine, all-wheel drive
- Related: Honda Pilot; Acura ZDX

Powertrain
- Engine: 3.7 L J37A1 SOHC VTEC V6
- Transmission: 5-speed BYFA automatic (2007–09); 6-speed MT4A automatic (2010–13)

Dimensions
- Wheelbase: 108.3 in (2,751 mm)
- Length: 2007–09: 190.7 in (4,844 mm); 2010–13: 191.6 in (4,867 mm)
- Width: 2007–09: 78.7 in (1,999 mm); 2010–13: 78.5 in (1,994 mm)
- Height: 2007–09: 68.1 in (1,730 mm); 2007–09 (with roof rails): 70 in (1,778 mm); 2010–13: 68.2 in (1,732 mm); 2010–13 (with roof rails): 70.1 in (1,781 mm)
- Curb weight: 4,594–4,669 lb (2,084–2,118 kg)

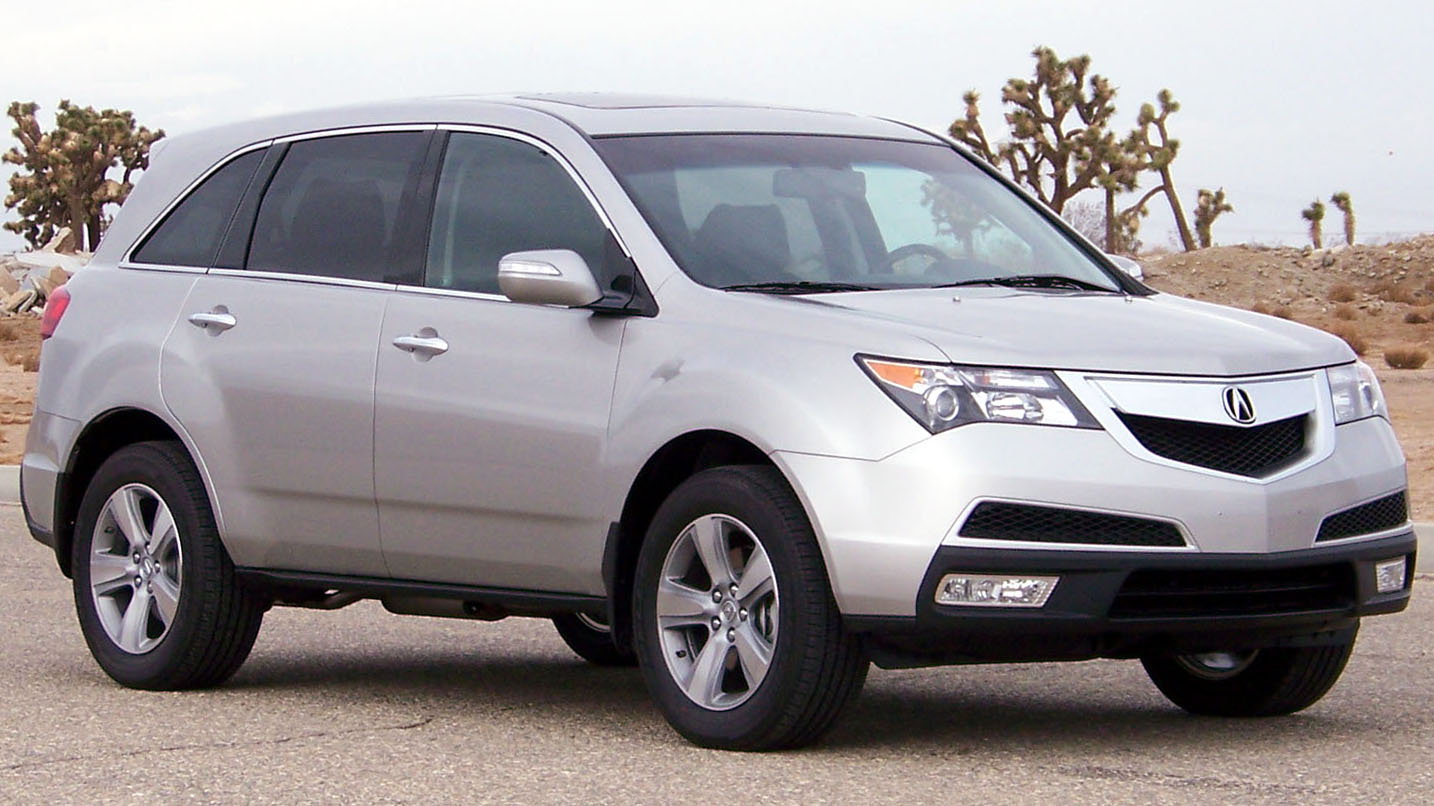
Facelift Acura MDX

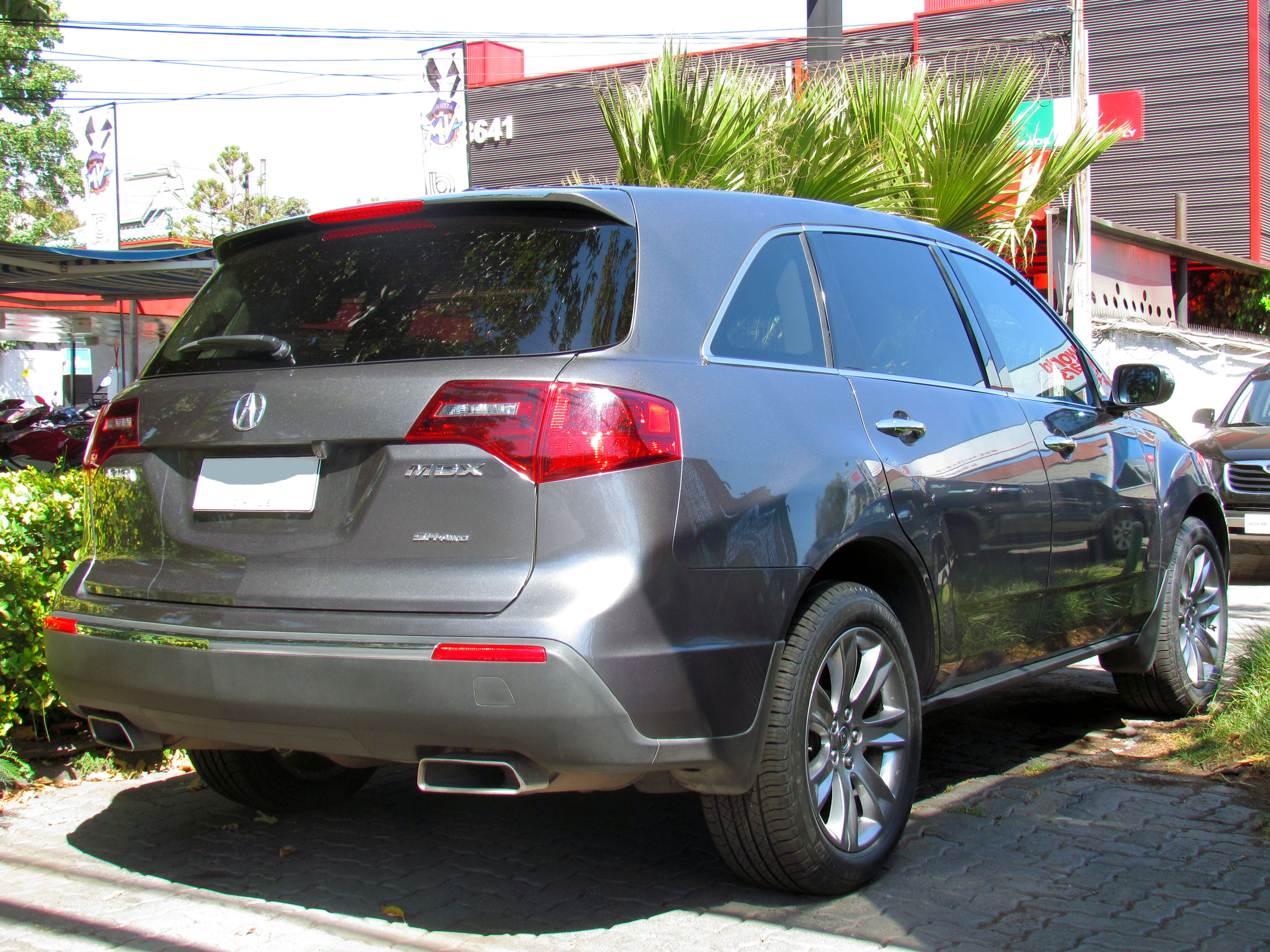
Facelift Acura MDX

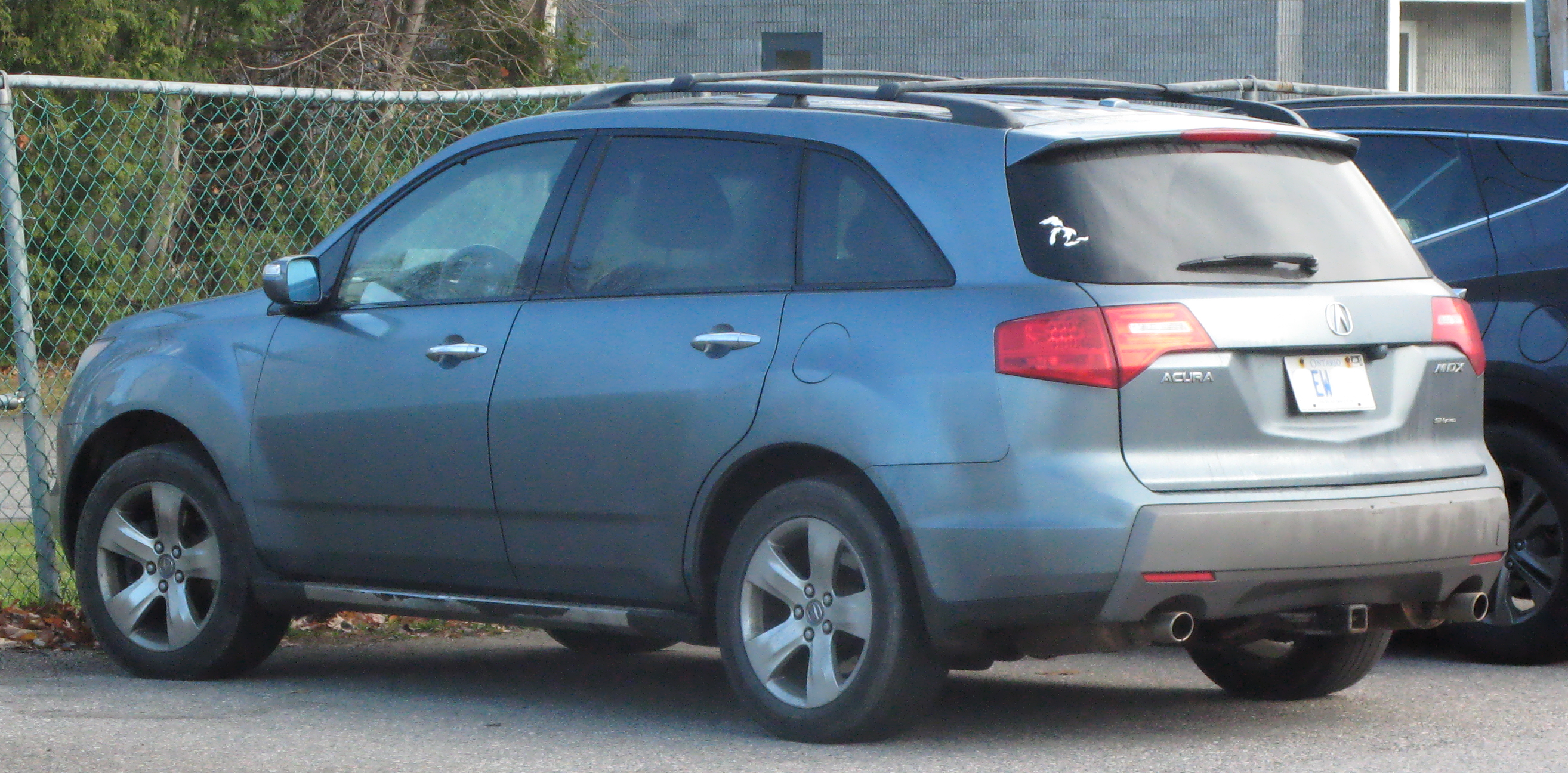
Pre-facelift Acura MDX (rear view)

On April 11, 2006, Acura unveiled the 2007 Acura MD-X Concept during the New York International Auto Show, showing to the public an indication about the exterior styling of the upcoming completely redesigned MDX. The second-generation MDX was release in the U.S. on October 17, 2006, for the 2007 model year.

The second generation model's body has a wider track and longer wheelbase than the previous MDX. There is less visibility to the rear compared to the prior generation, however an available backup camera compensates for this. The redesigned Acura MDX's unit-body was engineered with Honda's Advanced Compatibility Engineering (ACE) body structure designed to absorb energy from a collision. The suspension was tuned at Germany's Nürburgring race track.

The engine was upgraded to a 3.7-liter (3664 cc) V6 gasoline engine tuned to 300 hp (224 kW) at 6,000 rpm and 270 lb⋅ft (366 N⋅m) of torque at 5,000 rpm. It accelerates from 0 to 60 mph in 6.5 seconds and is estimated by the EPA to consume 16 miles per US gallon (15 L/100 km; 19 mpg_{‑imp}) in the city and 21 miles per US gallon (11 L/100 km; 25 mpg_{‑imp}) on the highway. It is one of the most powerful engines Honda has produced to date. The MDX is able to tow 5,000 lb (2,300 kg).

The "VTM-4" all-wheel drive system on the previous generation was replaced by the new SH-AWD "Super Handling All-Wheel Drive" previously debuted on the 2005 Acura RL. This AWD system is one of the most advanced in its class, featuring an active rear differential often found on high performance cars, which somewhat mitigates the nose-heaviness of the MDX's traverse engine platform so it can dynamically compete with the longitudinal engine layout crossover SUVs. The latter types of vehicles, such as the BMW X5 or Audi Q5, have a more balanced 50/50 front/rear distribution for better handling, but have less efficient packaging for passenger/cargo room.

Like many Acura models, the MDX comes with a power sunroof, leather interior, and high-intensity discharge (Xenon) low-beam headlights. For the 2007 through 2009 model years, three option packages were available: Sport, Technology and Entertainment.

- The Technology Package includes the Acura/Alpine DVD-based satellite GPS navigation system with AcuraLink satellite communications with real-time traffic reporting (XM NavTraffic), a 410-watt Acura/ELS DTS Surround audio system with XM Satellite Radio, backup camera, and a remote powered liftgate, operated either from the key's remote, inside the car or directly from the lift gate.
- The Sport Package featured active suspension dampers (co-developed by Honda and Beijing West Industries) that dynamically improves handling according to road conditions with a button in the center stack to switch to Sport/Comfort modes. This Comfort/Sport mode uses magneto rheological dampers, which change their characteristics when a magnetic field is introduced (usually in milliseconds). The Sport package also includes unique 5-spoke aluminum-alloy wheels, perforated leather seats and the items in the Technology package.
- The Entertainment Package offers a flip-down 9-inch (230 mm) LCD screen with 2 wireless Dolby Digital headphones, second-row heated outboard seats, and a unique center-stack silver trim. The Entertainment Package is only available on Sport or Technology Package models as compared to the 1st Generation MDX where the Entertainment Package was available as a standalone package on Touring Models.

All Canadian Acura MDX models, aside from the heated front seats, also get the second-row heated outboard seats as standard equipment as well. A feature unique to Canadian MDX models are headlight washers. In terms of packages, Canadian MDX models get only two: Technology and Elite. The Technology package corresponds essentially to the US model's Technology package while the Elite package is an amalgamation of the US model's Sport and Entertainment packages. However, AcuraLink real-time traffic reporting through XM NavTraffic is unavailable for Canadian MDX models.

Like the first generation model, the new generation is manufactured exclusively by Honda of Canada Manufacturing Ltd. in Alliston, Ontario, Canada. Along with the 2007 RDX, the new MDX was the first Acura model to pass the Acura Quality Line, a special quality control and verification process separate from the other Honda vehicles.

In 2008, for the 2009 model year, the MDX had added more upgrades to the navigation system and there are two new colors added. The power tailgate, previously available only with the Entertainment package, was also included with Technology and Sport packages.

In 2010, the MDX received a facelift adopting to Acura's new "Power Plenum" grille that debuted on its 2009 model year sedans. The most important upgrades to the 2010 model where a new paddle shift six-speed SportShift automatic transmission with downshift Rev-matching, and an increase in compression ratio to 11.2:1 with forged aluminum pistons to replace the previous 2007–2009 3.7L's 11.0:1 pistons. Structural rigidity was improved for the 2010 model year. An Advance Package became available that included Adaptive Cruise Control, blind spot monitor, Active Damper suspension, collision mitigation braking system, wider 7-spoked 19 inch wheels and tires, Premium Milano leather ventilated seats and auto leveling headlights. Non-navigation equipped MDX models became equipped with a backup camera monitor located in the rear-view mirror.

In 2006, the redesigned MDX overtook the TL as Acura's top seller in the United States.

== Third generation (YD3/4/7; 2014) ==
Third generation
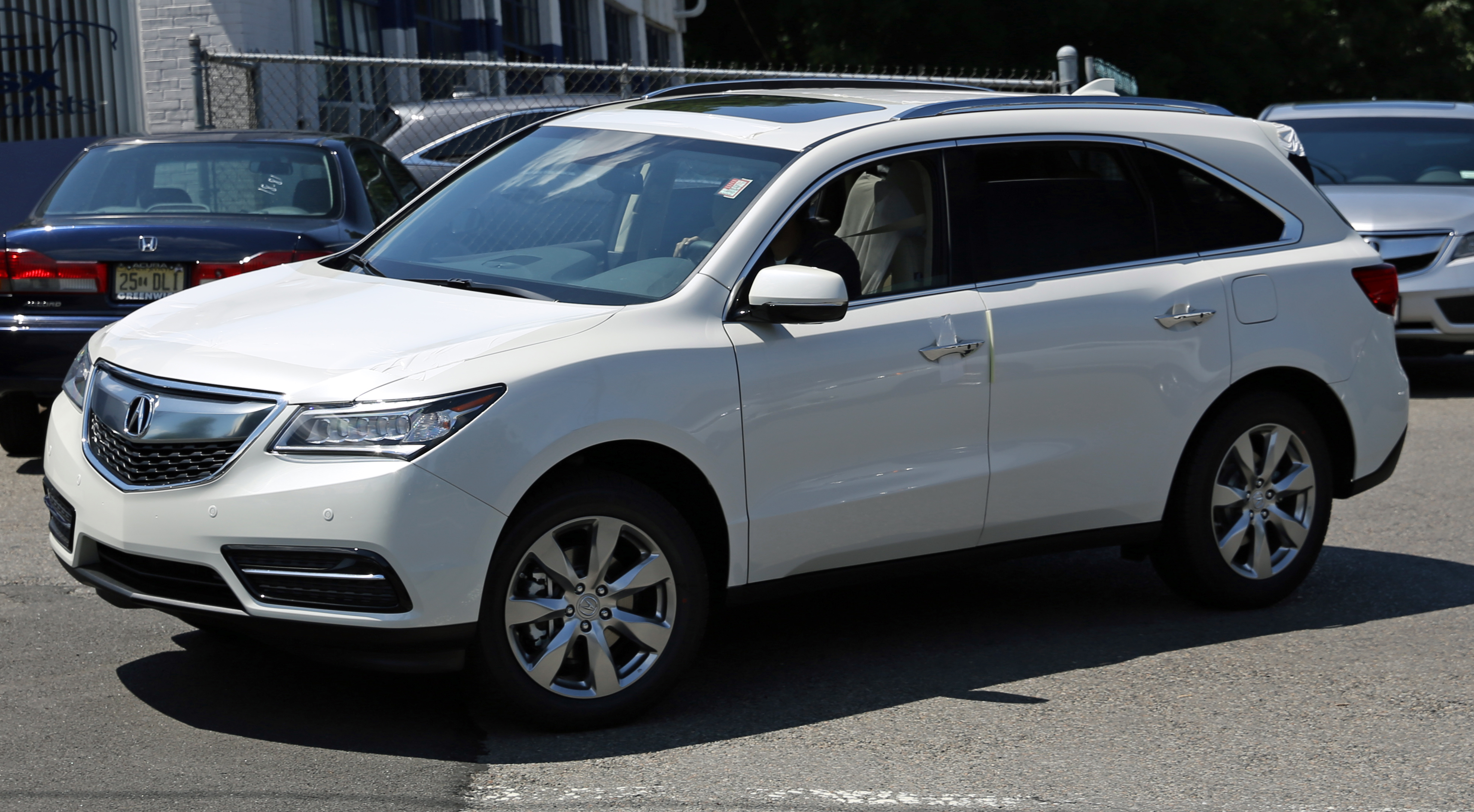
- Pre-facelift Acura MDX

Overview
- Model code: YD3/4/7
- Production: May 2013 – 2020
- Model years: 2014–2020
- Assembly: United States: Lincoln, Alabama, HMA (2013–2017); East Liberty, Ohio, ELP (2017–2020)

Body and chassis
- Layout: Front-engine, front-wheel-drive or all-wheel-drive (SH-AWD)
- Platform: Honda GLTP2
- Related: Honda Pilot; Honda Passport; Honda Ridgeline; Honda Odyssey (North America); Honda Avancier

Powertrain
- Engine: Gasoline: 3.5 L J35Y5 V6; 3.0 L J30Y1 V6 (hybrid)
- Transmission: 6-speed automatic 9-speed ZF 9HP automatic 7-speed DCT (hybrid)

Dimensions
- Wheelbase: 111.0 in (2,819 mm)
- Length: 193.6 in (4,917 mm)
- Width: 77.2 in (1,961 mm)
- Height: 2014–2016: 67.6 in (1,717 mm); 2017–2020: 67.4 in (1,712 mm)
- Curb weight: 3,960–4,169 lb (1,796–1,891 kg) (FWD); 4,195–4,268 lb (1,903–1,936 kg) (AWD)

The 2014 MDX Prototype was unveiled at the 2013 North American International Auto Show, the production version was revealed at the New York Auto Show. Production began on May 2, 2013; vehicle assembly shifted from Ontario, Canada to Lincoln, Alabama. US sales began on June 20, 2013, for the 2014 model year

The MDX is powered by a 3.5-liter direct injected Earth Dreams V6 gasoline engine with Variable Cylinder Management. A front-wheel drive (FWD) model is available for the first time, in Canada all-wheel drive remains the only configuration offered. EPA-estimated fuel economy is improved with all-wheel drive (SH-AWD) models rated at 18 mpg_{‑US} (13 L/100 km; 22 mpg_{‑imp})/27 mpg_{‑US} (8.7 L/100 km; 32 mpg_{‑imp})/21 mpg_{‑US} (11 L/100 km; 25 mpg_{‑imp}) (city/highway/combined) and FWD models rated at 20 mpg_{‑US} (12 L/100 km; 24 mpg_{‑imp})/28 mpg_{‑US} (8.4 L/100 km; 34 mpg_{‑imp})/23 mpg_{‑US} (10 L/100 km; 28 mpg_{‑imp}) (city/highway/combined).

The headlights are Acura's Jewel Eye LED Headlights (first introduced on the RLX). Each headlamp uses five separate LED sources with three used for low-beam lighting and two for high-beam lighting. LED bumper mounted fog lamps are offered as a dealer installed option.

The interior reduced button clutter by adding a 7-inch touchscreen with haptic feedback, an additional 8-inch screen is also standard. To reduce interior noise an acoustic (PVB layered) windshield, acoustic front door glass and thicker rear glass are used as well as triple sealed door openings. Advance package models include further noise reduction using a thicker carpet base layer and front fender liners. The seating H-point has been reduced.

According to Acura the exterior is more aerodynamic reducing drag by 16% with the new model lapping Nürburgring 8 seconds faster than its predecessor. The steering gear ratio is 9% quicker for a more sporty feel. The MDX rides lower, which reduces its center of gravity. To reduce unsprung mass, the front suspension lower control arms are made from forged aluminum. Structure rigidity is improved and weight reduced through increased use of high-strength steel. Overall, 64% of the total vehicle body mass is high strength steel (HSS), aluminum and magnesium. HSS makes up 59% of vehicle body mass; 1,500 MPa yield strength steel makes up 7%. A single ring-like hot stamped HSS outer door ring component reinforces the A-pillar, roof rail, B-pillar, and lower floor rail encircling the front doors for improved crash protection. Acura states that after conducting a simulated IIHS 25% small offset frontal crash test the front doors will open with normal force.

The updated Adaptive Cruise Control adds low-speed stop-and-go functionality. In terms of safety the MDX adds a standard driver's knee airbag, optional Lane Keeping Assist System and Collision Mitigation Braking System.

For the 2016 model year, the Honda 6-speed automatic transmission was replaced for a ZF 9-speed automatic with more closely spaced gear ratios, which is 66 lbs. lighter and 25% faster gear shifts. The console-mounted shift lever was replaced with a push-button electronic gear selector. Also the Super Handling All-Wheel Drive (SH-AWD) system was upgraded with a twin-clutch rear differential which is 19 lbs. lighter and similar system found in the TLX.

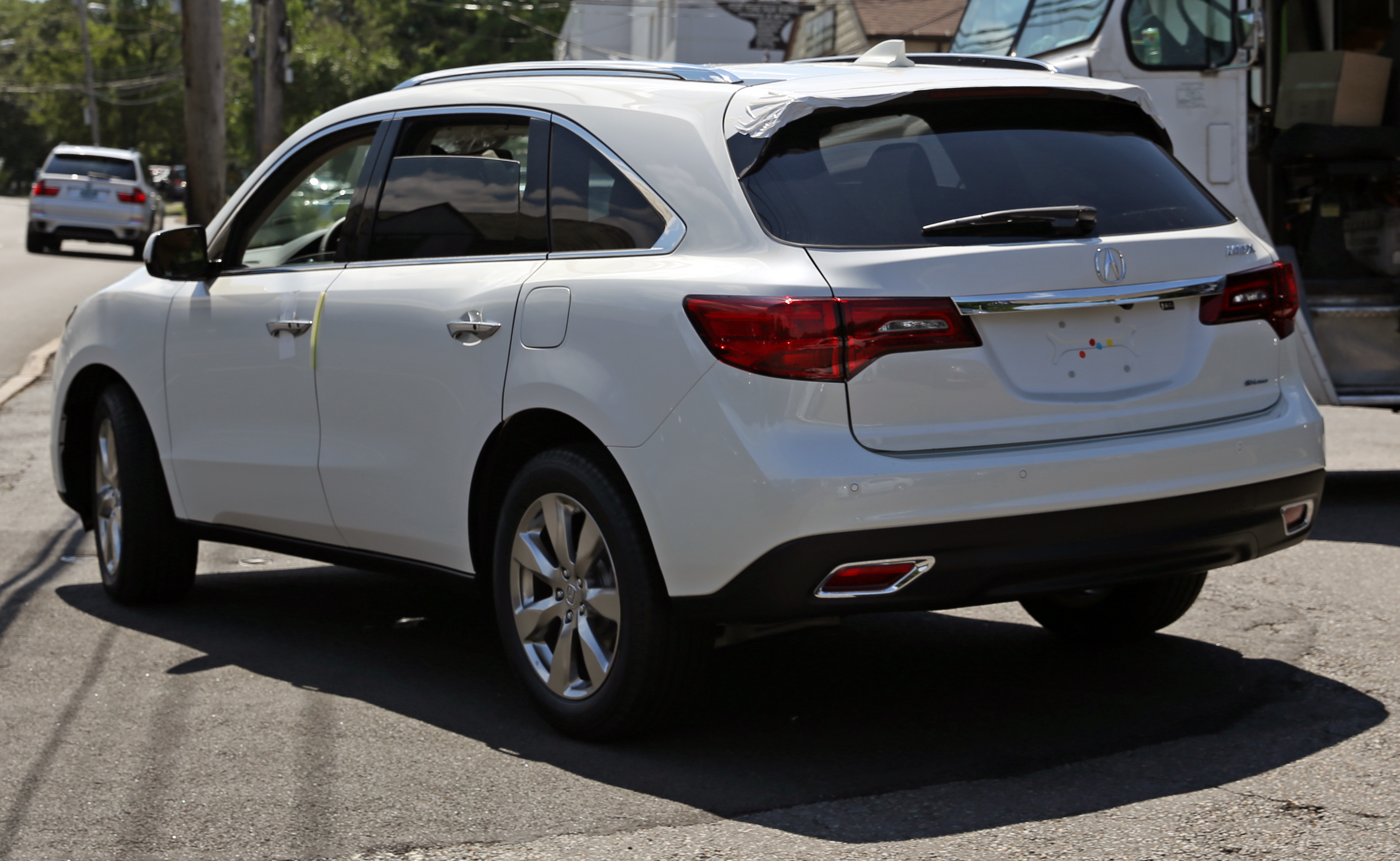
Rear view (US, pre-facelift)

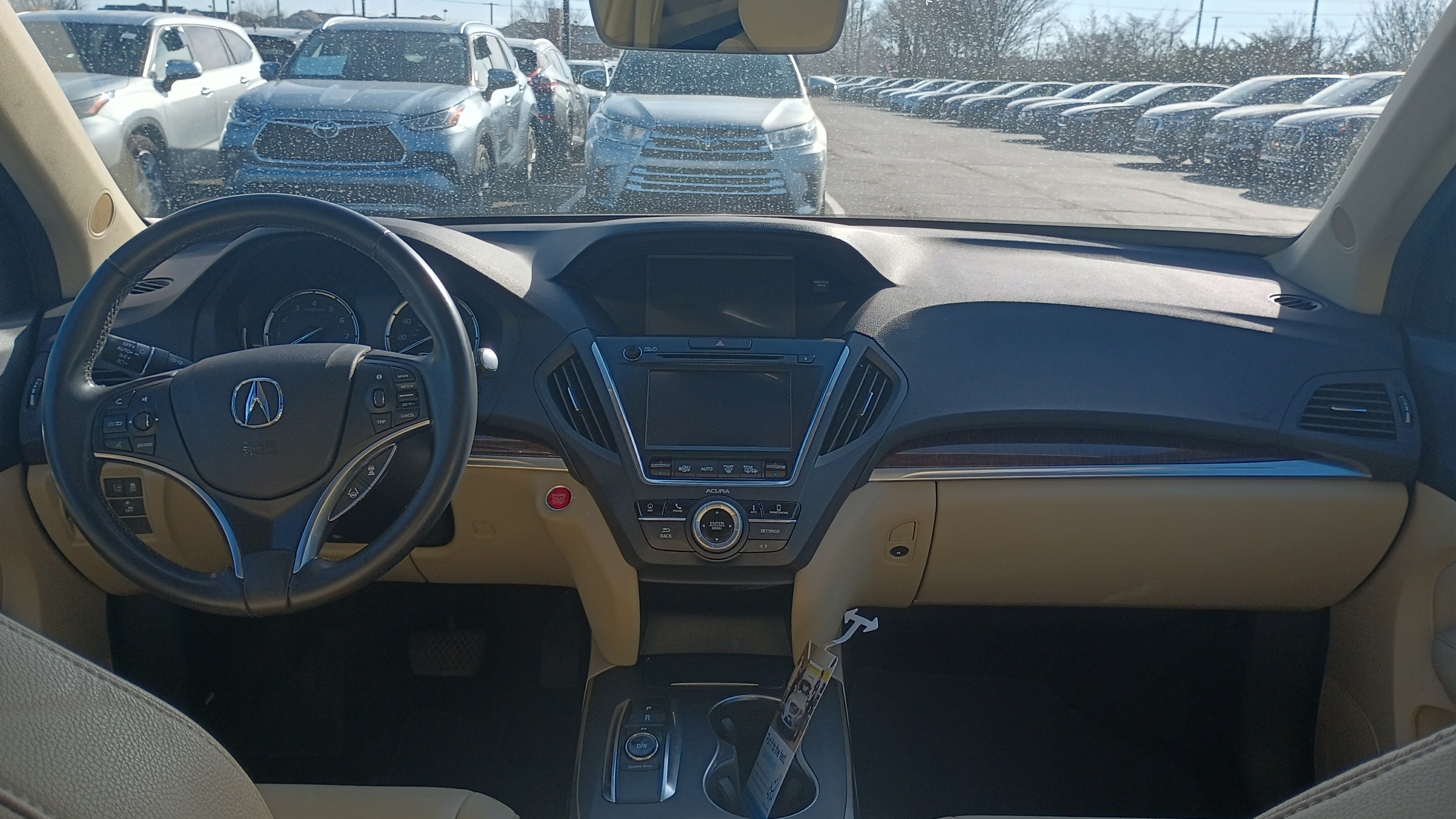
Interior

=== 2017 facelift ===
The MDX was refreshed for the 2017 model year and went on sale in June 2016. It features a diamond pentagon front grille which debuted on the Acura Precision Concept. To reduce body mass the front fenders switched from steel to an aluminum panel.

All 2017 MDX trims will come standard with the AcuraWatch™ suite of advanced safety and driver-assistive technologies, including Collision Mitigation Braking System™ (CMBS™) with Forward Collision Warning (FCW), Lane Keeping Assist (LKAS), Adaptive Cruise Control (ACC) with low-speed follow, and Road Departure Mitigation (RDM) with Lane Departure Warning (LDW). An Electric Parking Brake with Automatic Brake Hold, Auto High Beam headlights, SiriusXM Radio™ 2.0 and four 2.5-amp USB charging ports features are standard.

Models with Technology and Advance packages add Bi-Directional Keyless Remote Engine Start, new 20-inch wheel and tires (+1 inch), power folding side mirrors, and HD Traffic™. Advance grades models add LED fog lights, genuine wood interior trim, a heated steering wheel and Surround-View Camera System with six selectable viewing angles. Also come equipped with two second-row captain's chairs and a center console with two USB ports, replacing the three-person second-row seating found on lower grades. An ultra-widescreen Rear Entertainment System is also available on models with the Advance ENT Package.

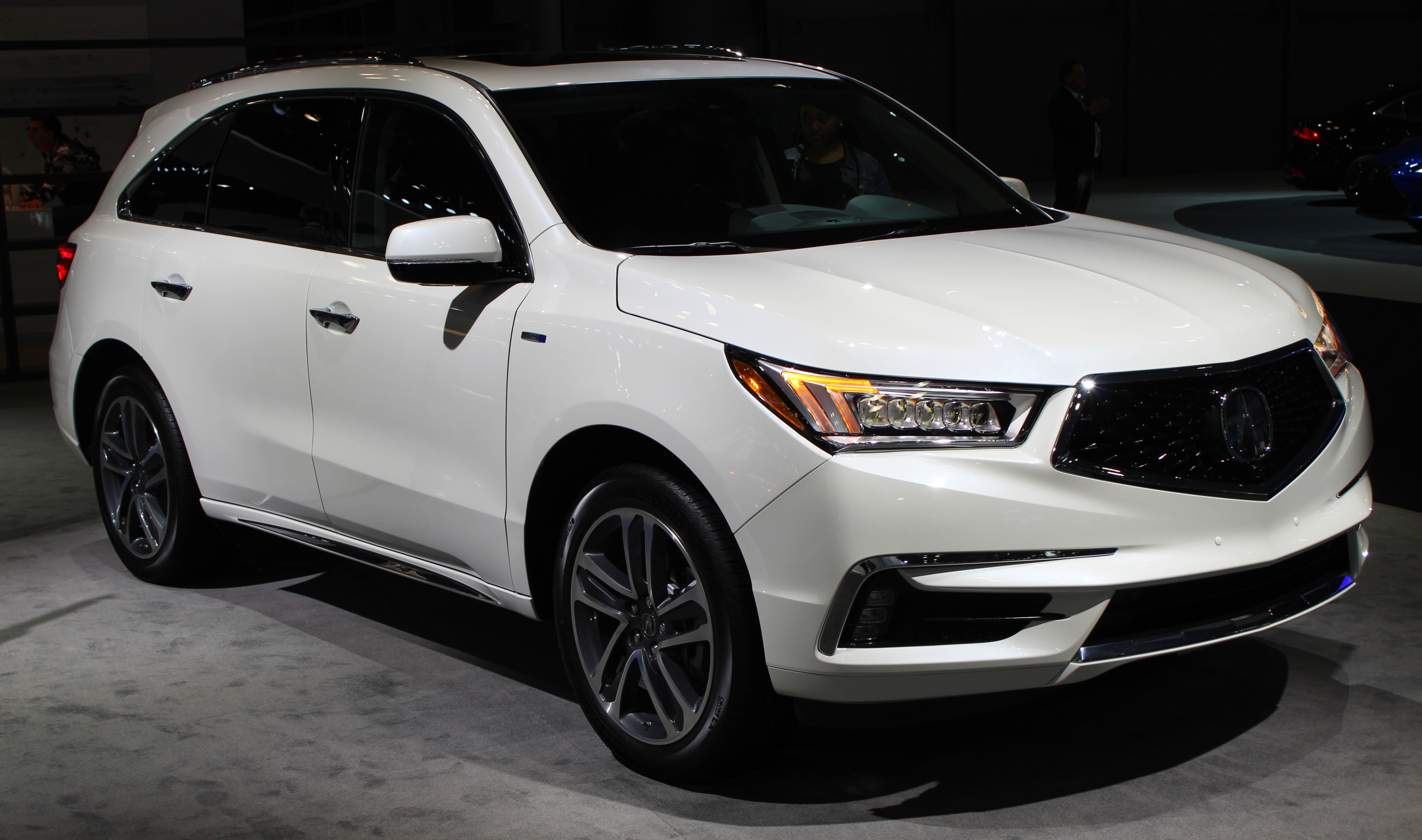
2019 Acura MDX SH-AWD

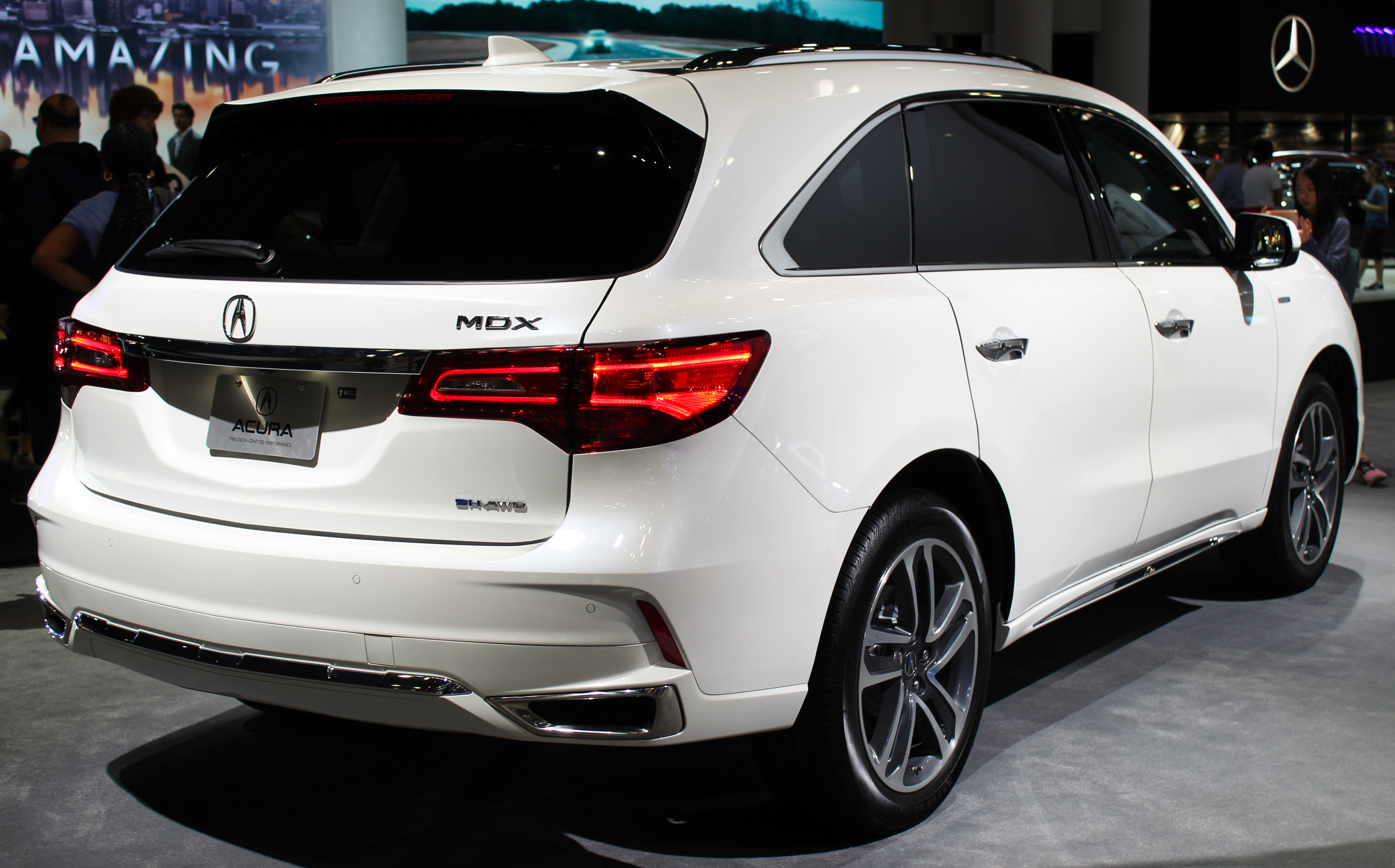
Rear view (US, facelift)

==== 2017 MDX Sport Hybrid (YD7) ====
The MDX Sport Hybrid (YD7) powered by a 3.0-liter SOHC V6, 7-speed dual-clutch, 1.3 kWh lithium-ion battery gasoline hybrid producing 321 hp (239 kW) and 289 lb⋅ft (392 N⋅m) was added to the lineup. The front wheels are powered by the engine and a single electric motor, and the rear wheels are powered by two electric motors. The Sport Hybrid comes as standard with the SH-AWD system, Acura's Active Damper System and the Integrated Dynamics System with a SPORT+ mode. Sales commenced in April 2017 for the 2017 model year and was available in Technology and Advanced packages.

For 2018 model year, the MDX features a redesigned dual-screen user interface (ODMD 2.0) with more intuitive menus and command structures complemented by a 7-inch capacitive touchscreen (previously resistive type) with a 30% faster response time, which support for Apple CarPlay™ and Android Auto™ compatibility as standard.

During the 2018 New York International Auto Show, alongside the debut of the third generation RDX, Acura announced the introduction of the A-Spec appearance package for the 2019 model year. Available only with SH-AWD system, features an exclusive 20-inch Shark Grey aluminum alloy wheels wrapped in low profile 265/45-series tires. An aggressive new front fascia, body-color lower sills, larger-diameter exhaust finishers, as well as gloss-black and dark chrome trim for the headlights, grille, window surround and rear tailgate spoiler. Interior enhancements feature sport seats trimmed in rich red or black leather with black Alcantara™ inserts, high-contrast stitching, unique A-Spec gauges, sport pedals, Alcantara door inserts, gloss-black trim, a thicker-rimmed A-Spec-badged steering wheel with paddle shifters, and an exclusive A-Spec door step garnish.

On all 2019 models, the 9-speed automatic transmission was enhanced for smoother and more fluid acceleration feel. Driver and front passenger seats feature 4-way power lumbar adjustments as standard, while the Technology and Entertainment packages receive an updated second-row seat configuration, allowing easy passage to the third row. The MDX with Advance package was available with Acura's Active Damper System (ADS), previously available only on the MDX Sport Hybrid. And new 20-inch aluminum alloy wheels design gained a half-inch in width (up from 8.0 inches) and shod with wider 265/45-series tires (up from 245/50).

=== Powertrain ===
Engine	Drivetrain	Transmission	Horsepower	Torque
3.5 SOHC i-VTEC	Front Wheel Drive	6 or 9-speed Automatic Transmission	290 hp (216 kW) at 6,200	267 lb⋅ft (362 N⋅m) at 4,700
3.5 SOHC i-VTEC	Super Handling All-Wheel Drive	6 or 9-speed Automatic Transmission	290 hp (216 kW) at 6,200	267 lb⋅ft (362 N⋅m) at 4,700
3.0 SOHC i-VTEC	Sport-Hybrid Super Handling All-Wheel Drive	7-speed Dual-Clutch Automatic Transmission	321 hp (239 kW) at 6,300 (combined)	289 lb⋅ft (392 N⋅m) at 5,000 (combined)

=== Marketing ===
As part of 2014 Acura MDX launch in the United States, a campaign called 'The Extremely New MDX - Made for Mankind' was produced. The campaign highlights the complete technical transformation of the MDX and centers around the idea of "Made for Mankind," a concept designed to highlight the unique engineering and design philosophy at the heart of all Acura vehicles - the synergy between man and machine. The campaign was developed by Mullen (Boston and LA) and with MediaVest. Also, a series of 8 comedic commercials were created with comedian Jerry Seinfeld and director Barry Sonnenfeld. In addition, Acura became an exclusive sponsor of Comedians in Cars Getting Coffee.

=== Safety ===
NHTSA 2014 MDX:
Overall:	5/5 stars
Overall Front	5/5 stars
Overall Side	5/5 stars
Rollover	4/5 stars

IIHS scores (2014 model year)
Moderate overlap front (driver)	Good
Small overlap front (driver)	Good
Side (original)	Good
Roof strength	Good
Head restraints and seats	Good
Front crash prevention (vehicle-to-vehicle)	Advanced

== Fourth generation (YD8/9/YE1; 2022) ==
Fourth generation
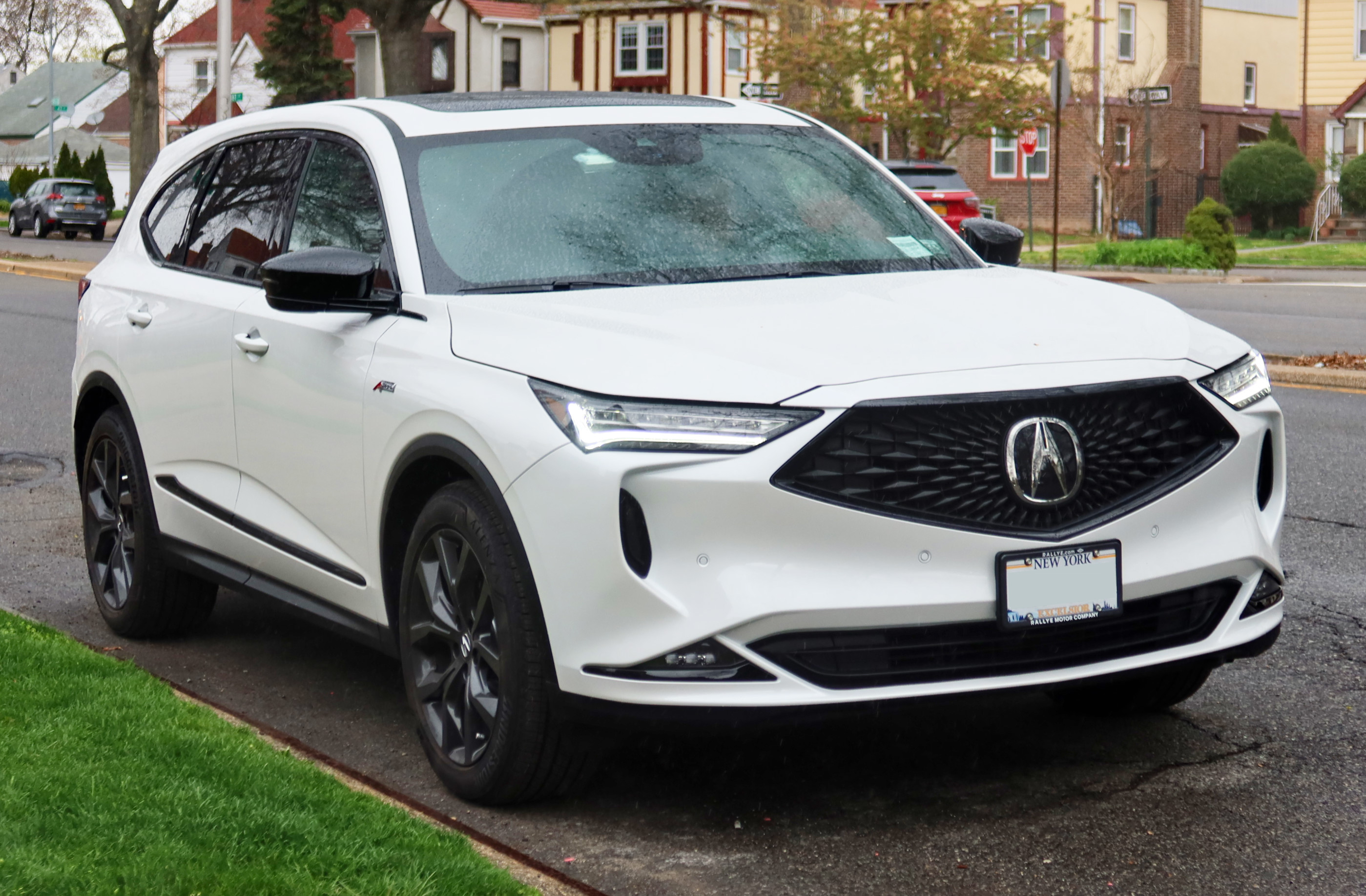
- 2022 Acura MDX A-Spec (US)

Overview
- Model code: YD8/9/YE1
- Production: January 2021 – present
- Model years: 2022–present
- Assembly: United States: East Liberty, Ohio

Body and chassis
- Layout: Front-engine, front-wheel-drive or all-wheel-drive (SH-AWD)
- Platform: Honda PF7
- Related: Honda Pilot (fourth generation)

Powertrain
- Engine: 3.0 L Honda J30AC turbo V6 (Type-S, YD8); 3.5 L Honda J35Y5 V6 (YD9/YE1)
- Transmission: 10-speed automatic

Dimensions
- Wheelbase: 113.8 in (2,891 mm)
- Length: 198.4 in (5,039 mm)
- Width: 78.7 in (1,999 mm)
- Height: 67.1 in (1,704 mm)
- Curb weight: 4,271–4,297 lb (1,937–1,949 kg) (FWD); 4,503–4,565 lb (2,043–2,071 kg) (AWD)

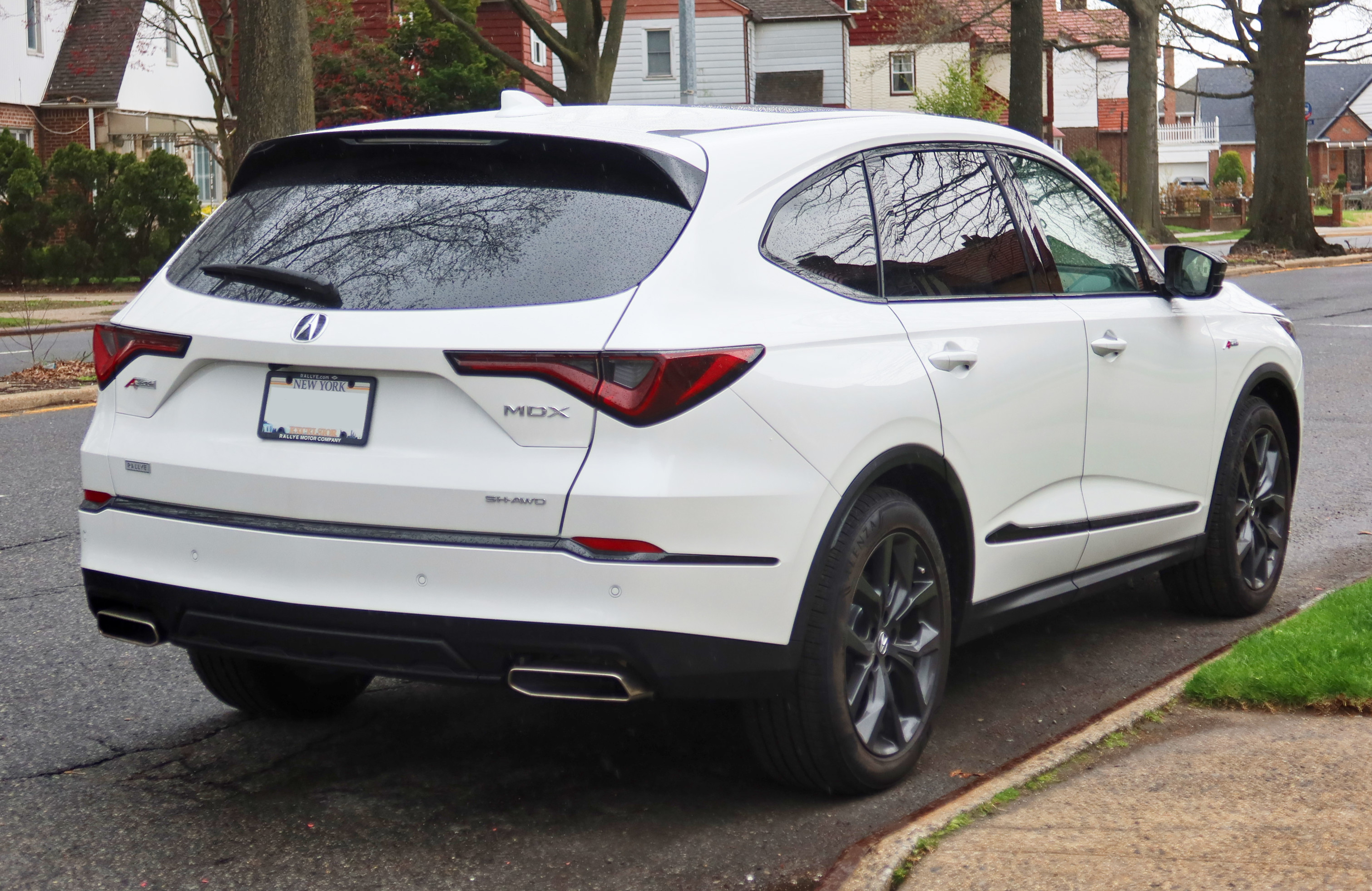
Rear view

Skipping the 2021 model year, the fourth-generation MDX was revealed as a prototype on October 14, 2020, virtually revealed on December 8, went into bulk production on January 12, 2021, for the 2022 model year, and went on sale on February 2, with the Type-S trim released on December 23. The MDX became the flagship model of the Acura marque following the discontinuation of the RLX mid-size luxury sedan in June 2020.

The exterior includes the standard panoramic sunroof, either 19 or 20-inch alloy rims, a tailgate similar to the 2019 RDX, headlights and taillights similar to the second-generation TLX, a differently styled grille emblem, nine exterior and seven interior colors. For the Type-S trim, a yellow color, called Tiger Eye will also be available. The improved interior includes a 12.3-inch infotainment system and the Acura's first 12-inch digital full TFT instrument cluster, touch pad, 16-way power front seats with 3-memory positions, removable center second row seat, a removable double sided trunk floor with carpet and plastic, and more legroom and headroom compared to the third generation MDX. The MDX also features an optional audio system with 16-speakers including four roof-mounted speakers and a foot sensor for Hands Free Access power tailgate release and closure when the key fob is nearby. A redesigned key fob that is shaped like a convex irregular polygon is included.

Powertrains are improved, with the existing 3.5-liter V6 gasoline engine paired with a 10-speed transmission available for four trims; base, technology package, A-Spec, and advance package. While the all-wheel-drive (AWD) is optional on the base and technology trims, it is standard on A-Spec and advance trims. The Type-S trim model will get a 3.0-liter turbocharged V6 gasoline engine and front brakes with four-piston Brembo calipers as standard. All-wheel-drive will also be standard for the Type-S. However, there is no hybrid powertrain available unlike the previous generation.

In the front, a double wishbone suspension with forged aluminum lower control arms, damper forks, and steering knuckles makes its way into the MDX along with more rigid cast-aluminum shock towers, larger front brake rotors and wider alloy wheels. Plastic wheel well liners are replaced with fabric material and a repositioned air intake for easier access to both battery terminals. High-strength steel (HSS), press-hardened steel and aluminum make up 69.7% of vehicle body mass. The rear body is more rigid with suspension load paths passing into the C and D-pillars, allowing for towing capabilities. Standard towing capacity is 3,500 pounds (1,600 kg) while it can be increased to 5,000 pounds (2,300 kg) when the transmission cooler is added. The cooler kit is available as an accessory for the AWD models.

=== 2025 facelift ===
The MDX facelift was revealed on April 9, 2024, for the 2025 model year. Changes include updated exterior styling, new exterior colors, new alloy wheel designs, the touchpad controller has been replaced in favour of additional storage space and a wireless charging pad, a new 12.3-inch touchscreen infotainment system with Google built-in and the addition of new safety features such as AcuraWatch 360 system. The ELS Studio 3D audio system is replaced by a new Bang & Olufsen system with 19 speakers in non-Type S trims and 31 speakers in the Type S trim. SiriusXM satellite radio was discontinued beginning with the 2025 model year. Powertrain options remain unchanged.

=== Safety ===
The 2022 MDX was awarded "Top Safety Pick +" by the IIHS.

IIHS scores (2022 model year)
Small overlap front (driver)	Good
Small overlap front (passenger)	Good
Moderate overlap front (original test)	Good
Side (original test)	Good
Side (updated test)	Good
Roof strength	Good
Head restraints and seats	Good
Headlights	Good
Front crash prevention: vehicle-to-vehicle	Superior
Front crash prevention: vehicle-to-pedestrian (Day)	Superior
Front crash prevention: vehicle-to-pedestrian (Night)	Advanced
Child seat anchors (LATCH) ease of use	Good+

== Awards ==
- North American Car of the Year Utility Finalist for 2019.
- Car and Driver magazine's Best Luxury SUV in 2001.
- Motor Trend magazine's SUV of the Year Contender in 2017.
- The MDX also won the IIHS Top Safety Pick award for the 2018 model year.
- The 2019 Acura MDX ranked #6 Luxury Midsize SUV by U.S. News & World Report as of 2019.
- The MDX was ranked 7th for the SUV vehicle owners keep for the longest time according to a 2019 iSeeCars study.

== Sales ==
Calendar year	US	Canada	Mexico
2000	9,750		
2001	40,950		
2002	52,955		
2003	57,281		
2004	59,505		
2005	57,948	3,092	282
2006	54,121	4,102	466
2007	58,606	6,017	761
2008	45,377	5,514	743
2009	31,178	5,994	593
2010	47,210	5,994	719
2011	43,271	5,334	617
2012	50,854	5,242	365
2013	53,040	6,114	639
2014	65,603	6,272	916
2015	58,208	5,814	489
2016	55,495	5,425	761
2017	54,886	5,838	891
2018	51,512	5,605	710
2019	52,019	4,757	406
2020	47,816	3,237	132
2021	60,057	5,082	278
2022	46,425	4,012	345
2023	57,599	3,842	444
2024	50,112		
2025	41,460		
