= Block and bleed manifold =

A block and bleed manifold is a hydraulic manifold that combines one or more block/isolate valves, usually ball valves, and one or more bleed/vent valves, usually ball or needle valves, into one component for interface with other components (pressure measurement transmitters, gauges, switches, etc.) of a hydraulic (fluid) system. The purpose of the block and bleed manifold is to isolate or block the flow of fluid in the system so the fluid from upstream of the manifold does not reach other components of the system that are downstream. Then they bleed off or vent the remaining fluid from the system on the downstream side of the manifold. For example, a block and bleed manifold would be used to stop the flow of fluids to some component, then vent the fluid from that component’s side of the manifold, in order to effect some kind of work (maintenance/repair/replacement) on that component.

== Types of valves ==
=== Block and bleed ===
A block and bleed manifold with one block valve and one bleed valve is also known as an isolation valve or block and bleed valve; a block and bleed manifold with multiple valves is also known as an isolation manifold. This valve is used in combustible gas trains in many industrial applications. Block and bleed needle valves are used in hydraulic and pneumatic systems because the needle valve allows for precise flow regulation when there is low flow in a non-hazardous environment.

=== Double block and bleed (DBB) ===
These valves replace existing traditional techniques employed by pipeline engineers to generate a double block and bleed configuration in the pipeline. Two block valves and a bleed valve are as a unit, or manifold, to be installed for positive isolation. Used for critical process service, DBB valves are for high pressure systems or toxic/hazardous fluid processes. Applications that use DBB valves include instrument drain, chemical injection connection, chemical seal isolation, and gauge isolation. DBB valves do the work of three separate valves (2 isolations and 1 drain) and require less space and have less weight.

=== Cartridge-type standard-length DBB ===
This type of double block and bleed valve has a patented design which incorporates two ball valves and a bleed valve into one compact cartridge-type unit with ANSI B16.5 tapped-flanged connections. The major benefit of this design configuration is that the valve has the same face-to-face dimension as a single block ball valve (as specified in API 6D and ANSI B16.10), which means the valve can easily be installed into an existing pipeline without the need for any pipeline re-working.

=== Three-piece nonstandard-length DBB ===
This type of double block and bleed valve features the traditional style of flange-by-flange type valve and is available with ANSI B16.5 flanges, hub connections and welded ends to suit the pipeline system it is to be installed in. It features all the benefits of the single-unit DBB valve, with the added benefit of a bespoke face-to-face dimension if required.

=== Single-unit DBB ===
This design also has operational advantages. There are significantly fewer potential leak paths within the double block and bleed section of the pipeline. Because the valves are full bore with an uninterrupted flow orifice they have got a negligible pressure drop across the unit. The pipelines where these valves are installed can also be pigged without any problems.

There are several advantages in using a double block and bleed valve. Significantly, because all the valve components are housed in a single unit, the space required for the installation is dramatically reduced thus freeing up room for other pieces of essential equipment.

Considering the operations and procedures executed before an operator can intervene, the double block and bleed manifold offers further advantages over the traditional hook up. Due to the volume of the cavity between the two balls being so small, the operator is afforded the opportunity to evacuate this space efficiently thereby quickly establishing a safe working environment.
