= Isolation valve =

Valve closing off part of a system

An isolation valve is a valve in a fluid handling system that stops the flow of process media to a given location, usually for maintenance or safety purposes. They can also be used to provide flow logic (selecting one flow path versus another), and to connect external equipment to a system. A valve is classified as an isolation valve because of its intended function in a system, not because of the type of the valve itself. Therefore, many different types of valves can be classified as isolation valves.

To easily understand the concept of an isolation valve, one can think of the valves under a kitchen or bathroom sink in a typical household. These valves are normally left open so that the user can control the flow of water with the spigot above the sink, and does not need to reach under the counter to start or stop the water flow. However, if the spigot needs to be replaced (i.e. maintenance needs to take place on the system), the isolation valves are shut to stop the flow of water when the spigot is removed. In this system, the isolation valves and the spigot may even be the same type of valve. However, due to their function they are classified as the isolation valves and, in the case of the spigot, the control valves. As the isolation valve is intended to be operated infrequently and only in the fully on or fully off positions, they are often inferior quality globe valves. These less expensive styles lack a bonnet and stem seal in favor of threading the stem directly into the body. The stem is covered with a rubber washer and metal cap similar in appearance to a gland nut. Because they lack a stem seal they will leak unless fully closed and installed in the correct direction or fully open, causing the disk to compress the top washer against the stem.

== Process plant practice ==
Isolation valves can be in the normally open position (NO) or normally closed (NC). Normally open valves are located between pressure vessels, pumps, compressors, tanks, pressure sensors, liquid level measurement instrumentation and other components and allow fluids to flow between components, or to be connected to sensors. The controlled closure of open valves enables the isolation of plant components for testing or maintenance of equipment, or allows flow of fluid to specific flow paths. Normally closed valves are used to connect fluids and process components to other systems only when required. Vent and drain valves are examples of normally closed valves which are only opened when required to depressurise (vent) or drain fluids from a system.

Isolation valves must effectively stop the passage of fluids. Gate valves, ball valves and plug valves are generally considered to provide tight and effective shut-off. Globe valves and Butterfly valves may not be tight shut-off due to wear on the plug or the seat, or due to their design, and may not be appropriate to provide effective isolation.

Some valves are in a safety critical service and are secured, or otherwise locked, in an open or closed position. Plant shutdown instrumentation must be effectively connected to the plant at all times, therefore the isolation valves associated with such equipment must be secured in the open position to prevent inadvertent movement or closure. Securing mechanisms include car-seals, chain and padlocks and proprietary securing devices. Isolation valves in a flare, relief or vent system must ensure that a flow path is always available to the flare or vent. These valves are secured in the open position (LO). Drain valves that connect a high pressure system to a low pressure drain system are locked in the closed position (LC) to prevent potential over-pressurisation of the drain system. Removal of locks from secured valves is only undertaken in specified and controlled conditions such as under a ‘permit to work’ system. Some relief or pressure relief valves are ‘paired’ to provide a duty and a standby valve, the associated isolation valves are interlocked such that at least one relief valve is connected to the system being protected at all times.

A single valve may provide effective isolation between the live plant and the system being maintained. However, for hazardous systems a more effective means of isolation is required. This may comprise a ‘double block’ consisting of two valves in series. Still more effective is a ‘double block and bleed’ comprising two isolation valves in series plus a bleed valve between them. The bleed valve enables the integrity of the valve on the hazardous side to be monitored.

== Common applications ==
- Firewater control
- Pipeline safety systems
- Residential plumbing systems (both water and gas)
- Nuclear reactors
- Oil and gas wells
- Chemical plant
- Oil production plant
- Power plant

== See also ==
- Valves
- Shutdown valve
- Globe valve
- Ball valve
- Gate valve
- Plug valve
- Butterfly valves
- Piping & Instrumentation Diagrams
