= Electrorheological fluid =

Type of chemical suspension

Electrorheological (ER) fluids are suspensions of extremely fine non-conducting but electrically active particles (up to 50 micrometres diameter) in an electrically insulating fluid. The apparent viscosity of these fluids changes reversibly by an order of up to 100,000 in response to an electric field. For example, a typical ER fluid can go from the consistency of a liquid to that of a gel, and back, with response times on the order of milliseconds. The effect is sometimes called the Winslow effect after its discoverer, the American inventor Willis Winslow, who obtained a US patent on the effect in 1947 and wrote an article published in 1949.

== The ER effect ==
The change in apparent viscosity is dependent on the applied electric field, i.e. the potential divided by the distance between the plates. The change is not a simple change in viscosity, hence these fluids are now known as ER fluids, rather than by the older term Electro Viscous fluids. The effect is better described as an electric field dependent shear yield stress. When activated an ER fluid behaves as a Bingham plastic (a type of viscoelastic material), with a yield point which is determined by the electric field strength. After the yield point is reached, the fluid shears as a fluid, i.e. the incremental shear stress is proportional to the rate of shear (in a Newtonian fluid there is no yield point and stress is directly proportional to shear). Hence the resistance to motion of the fluid can be controlled by adjusting the applied electric field.

== Composition and theory ==
ER fluids are a type of smart fluid. A simple ER fluid can be made by mixing cornflour in a light vegetable oil or (better) silicone oil.

There are two main theories to explain the effect: the interfacial tension or 'water bridge' theory, and the electrostatic theory. The water bridge theory assumes a three phase system, the particles contain the third phase which is another liquid (e.g. water) immiscible with the main phase liquid (e.g. oil). With no applied electric field the third phase is strongly attracted to and held within the particles. This means the ER fluid is a suspension of particles, which behaves as a liquid. When an electric field is applied the third phase is driven to one side of the particles by electro osmosis and binds adjacent particles together to form chains. This chain structure means the ER fluid has become a solid. The electrostatic theory assumes just a two phase system, with dielectric particles forming chains aligned with an electric field in an analogous way to how magnetorheological fluid (MR) fluids work. An ER fluid has been constructed with the solid phase made from a conductor coated in an insulator. This ER fluid clearly cannot work by the water bridge model. However, although demonstrating that some ER fluids work by the electrostatic effect, it does not prove that all ER fluids do so. The advantage of having an ER fluid which operates on the electrostatic effect is the elimination of leakage current, i.e. potentially there is no direct current. Of course, since ER devices behave electrically as capacitors, and the main advantage of the ER effect is the speed of response, an alternating current is to be expected.

The particles are electrically active. They can be ferroelectric or, as mentioned above, made from a conducting material coated with an insulator, or electro-osmotically active particles. In the case of ferroelectric or conducting material, the particles would have a high dielectric constant. There may be some confusion here as to the dielectric constant of a conductor, but "if a material with a high dielectric constant is placed in an electric field, the magnitude of that field will be measurably reduced within the volume of the dielectric" (see main page: Dielectric constant), and since the electric field is zero in an ideal conductor, then in this context the dielectric constant of a conductor is infinite.

Another factor that influences the ER effect is the geometry of the electrodes. The introduction of parallel grooved electrodes showed slight increase in the ER effect but perpendicular grooved electrodes doubled the ER effect. A much larger increase in ER effect can be obtained by coating the electrodes with electrically polarisable materials. This turns the usual disadvantage of dielectrophoresis into a useful effect. It also has the effect of reducing leakage currents in the ER fluid.

The giant electrorheological (GER) fluid was discovered in 2003, and is able to sustain higher yield strengths than many other ER fluids. The GER fluid consists of Urea coated nanoparticles of Barium Titanium Oxalate suspended in silicone oil. The high yield strength is due to the high dielectric constant of the particles, the small size of the particles and the Urea coating. Another advantage of the GER is that the relationship between the electrical field strength and the yield strength is linear after the electric field reaches 1 kV/mm. The GER is a high yield strength, but low electrical field strength and low current density fluid compared to many other ER fluids. The procedure for preparation of the suspension is given in. The major concern is the use of oxalic acid for the preparation of the particles as it is a strong organic acid.

== Applications ==
The normal application of ER fluids is in fast acting hydraulic valves and clutches, with the separation between plates being in the order of 1 mm and the applied potential being in the order of 1 kV. In simple terms, when the electric field is applied, an ER hydraulic valve is shut or the plates of an ER clutch are locked together, when the electric field is removed the ER hydraulic valve is open or the clutch plates are disengaged. Other common applications are in ER brakes (think of a brake as a clutch with one side fixed) and shock absorbers (which can be thought of as closed hydraulic systems where the shock is used to try to pump fluid through a valve).

There are many novel uses for these fluids. Potential uses are in accurate abrasive polishing and as haptic controllers and tactile displays.

ER fluid has also been proposed to have potential applications in flexible electronics, with the fluid incorporated in elements such as rollable screens and keypads, in which the viscosity-changing qualities of the fluid allowing the rollable elements to become rigid for use, and flexible to roll and retract for storing when not in use. Motorola filed a patent application for mobile device applications in 2006.

== Problems and advantages ==
A major problem is that ER fluids are suspensions, hence in time they tend to settle out, so advanced ER fluids tackle this problem by means such as matching the densities of the solid and liquid components, or by using nanoparticles, which brings ER fluids into line with the development of magnetorheological fluids. Another problem is that the breakdown voltage of air is ~ 3 kV/mm, which is near the electric field needed for ER devices to operate.

An advantage is that an ER device can control considerably more mechanical power than the electrical power used to control the effect, i.e. it can act as a power amplifier. But the main advantage is the speed of response. There are few other effects able to control such large amounts of mechanical or hydraulic power so rapidly.

Unfortunately, the increase in apparent viscosity experienced by most Electrorheological fluids used in shear or flow modes is relatively limited. The ER fluid changes from a Newtonian liquid to a partially crystalline "semi-hard slush". However, an almost complete liquid to solid phase change can be obtained when the electrorheological fluid additionally experiences compressive stress. This effect has been used to provide electrorheological Braille displays and very effective clutches.

== See also ==
- Continuum mechanics
- Debye–Falkenhagen effect
- Electroactive polymers
- Electroadhesion
- Electroviscous effects
- Ferrofluid
- Fluid mechanics
- Magnetorheological fluid
- Electrowetting
- Smart fluid
