= Magnetorheological fluid =

Smart fluid whose viscosity increases in a magnetic field

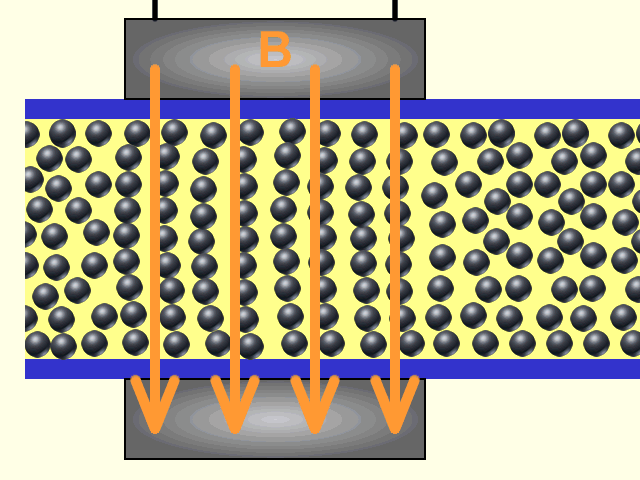
Schematic of a magnetorheological fluid solidifying and blocking a pipe in response to an external magnetic field. (Animated version available.)

A magnetorheological fluid (MR fluid, or MRF) is a type of smart fluid which, when subjected to a magnetic field, greatly increases in apparent viscosity, to the point of becoming a viscoelastic solid. Importantly, the yield stress of the fluid when in its active ("on") state can be controlled very accurately by varying the magnetic field intensity. The upshot is that the fluid's ability to transmit force can be controlled with an electromagnet, which gives rise to its many possible control-based applications.

MR fluid is different from a ferrofluid which has smaller particles. MR fluid particles are primarily on the micrometre-scale and are too dense for Brownian motion to keep them suspended (in the lower density carrier fluid). Ferrofluid particles are primarily nanoparticles that are suspended by Brownian motion and generally will not settle under normal conditions. As a result, these two fluids have very different applications.

== History ==
Studies published beginning in the late 2000s which explore the effect of varying the aspect ratio of the ferromagnetic particles have shown several improvements over conventional MR fluids. Nanowire-based fluids show no sedimentation after qualitative observation over a period of three months. This observation has been attributed to a lower close-packing density due to decreased symmetry of the wires compared to spheres, as well as the structurally supportive nature of a nanowire lattice held together by remnant magnetization. Further, they show a different range of loading of particles (typically measured in either volume or weight fraction) than conventional sphere- or ellipsoid-based fluids. Conventional commercial fluids exhibit a typical loading of 30 to 90 wt%, while nanowire-based fluids show a percolation threshold of ~0.5 wt% (depending on the aspect ratio). They also show a maximum loading of ~35 wt%, since high aspect ratio particles exhibit a larger per particle excluded volume as well as inter-particle tangling as they attempt to rotate end-over-end, resulting in a limit imposed by high off-state apparent viscosity of the fluids. This range of loadings suggest a new set of applications are possible which may have not been possible with conventional sphere-based fluids.

Newer studies have focused on dimorphic magnetorheological fluids, which are conventional sphere-based fluids in which a fraction of the spheres, typically 2 to 8 wt%, are replaced with nanowires. These fluids exhibit a much lower sedimentation rate than conventional fluids, yet exhibit a similar range of loading as conventional commercial fluids, making them also useful in existing high-force applications such as damping. Moreover, they also exhibit an improvement in apparent yield stress of 10% across those amounts of particle substitution.

Another way to increase the performance of magnetorheological fluids is to apply a pressure to them. In particular the properties in term of yield strength can be increased up to ten times in shear mode and up five times in flow mode. The motivation of this behaviour is the increase in the ferromagnetic particles friction, as described by the semiempirical magneto-tribological model by Zhang et al. Even though applying a pressure strongly improves the magnetorheological fluids behaviour, particular attention must be paid in terms of mechanical resistance and chemical compatibility of the sealing system used.

== Mechanism ==
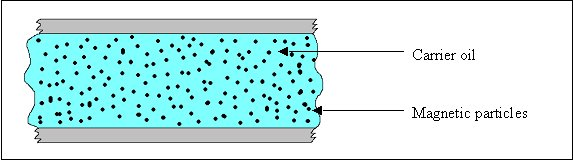
Magnetorheological fluid when not exposed to a magnetic field

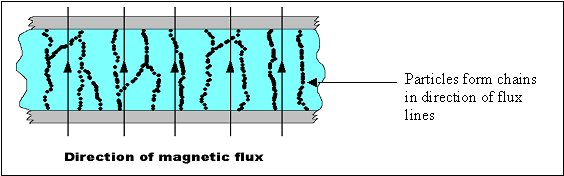
Magnetorheological fluid when a magnetic field is applied

The magnetic particles, which are typically micrometer or nanometer scale spheres or ellipsoids, are suspended within the carrier oil and distributed randomly in suspension under normal circumstances.

When a magnetic field is applied, however, the microscopic particles (usually in the 0.1–10 μm range) align themselves along the lines of magnetic flux, see below.

== Theory ==
To understand and predict the behavior of the MR fluid it is necessary to model the fluid mathematically, a task slightly complicated by the varying material properties (such as yield stress). As mentioned above, smart fluids are such that they have a low viscosity in the absence of an applied magnetic field, but become quasi-solid with the application of such a field. In the case of MR fluids (and ER), the fluid actually assumes properties comparable to a solid when in the activated ("on") state, up until a point of yield (the shear stress above which shearing occurs). This yield stress (commonly referred to as apparent yield stress) is dependent on the magnetic field applied to the fluid, but will reach a maximum point after which increases in magnetic flux density have no further effect, as the fluid is then magnetically saturated. The behavior of a MR fluid can thus be considered similar to a Bingham plastic, a material model which has been well-investigated.

However, MR fluid does not exactly follow the characteristics of a Bingham plastic. For example, below the yield stress (in the activated or "on" state), the fluid behaves as a viscoelastic material, with a complex modulus that is also known to be dependent on the magnetic field intensity. MR fluids are also known to be subject to shear thinning, whereby the viscosity above yield decreases with increased shear rate. Furthermore, the behavior of MR fluids when in the "off" state is also non-Newtonian and temperature dependent, however it deviates little enough for the fluid to be ultimately considered as a Bingham plastic for a simple analysis.

Thus our model of MR fluid behavior in the shear mode becomes:

$$\tau =\tau_y(H) + \eta\frac{dv}{dz}, \tau>\tau_y$$

Where $\tau$ = shear stress; $\tau_y$ = yield stress; $H$ = Magnetic field intensity $\eta$ = Newtonian viscosity; $\frac{dv}{dz}$ is the velocity gradient in the z-direction.

== Characteristics ==
Low shear strength has been the primary reason for limited range of applications. In the absence of external pressure the maximum shear strength is about 100 kPa. If the fluid is compressed in the magnetic field direction and the compressive stress is 2 MPa, the shear strength is raised to 1100 kPa. If the standard magnetic particles are replaced with elongated magnetic particles, the shear strength is also improved.

== Surfactants ==
Ferroparticles settle out of the suspension over time due to the inherent density difference between the particles and their carrier fluid. The rate and degree to which this occurs is one of the primary attributes considered in industry when implementing or designing an MR device. Surfactants are typically used to offset this effect, but at a cost of the fluid's magnetic saturation, and thus the maximum yield stress exhibited in its activated state.

Surfactants used include:

- oleic acid
- tetramethylammonium hydroxide
- citric acid
- soy lecithin

These surfactants serve to decrease the rate of ferroparticle settling, of which a high rate is an unfavorable characteristic of MR fluids. The ideal MR fluid would never settle, but developing this ideal fluid is as highly improbable as developing a perpetual motion machine according to our current understanding of the laws of physics. Surfactant-aided prolonged settling is typically achieved in one of two ways: by addition of surfactants, and by addition of spherical ferromagnetic nanoparticles. Addition of the nanoparticles results in the larger particles staying suspended longer since the non-settling nanoparticles interfere with the settling of the larger micrometre-scale particles due to Brownian motion. Addition of a surfactant allows micelles to form around the ferroparticles. A surfactant has a polar head and non-polar tail (or vice versa), one of which adsorbs to a ferroparticle, while the non-polar tail (or polar head) sticks out into the carrier medium, forming an inverse or regular micelle, respectively, around the particle. This increases the effective particle diameter. Steric repulsion then prevents heavy agglomeration of the particles in their settled state, which makes fluid remixing (particle redispersion) occur far faster and with less effort. For example, magnetorheological dampers will remix within one cycle with a surfactant additive, but are nearly impossible to remix without them.

While surfactants are useful in prolonging the settling rate in MR fluids, they also prove detrimental to the fluid's magnetic properties (specifically, the magnetic saturation), which is commonly a parameter which users wish to maximize in order to increase the maximum apparent yield stress. Whether the anti-settling additive is nanosphere-based or surfactant-based, their addition decreases the packing density of the ferroparticles while in its activated state, thus decreasing the fluids on-state/activated viscosity, resulting in a "softer" activated fluid with a lower maximum apparent yield stress. While the on-state viscosity (the "hardness" of the activated fluid) is also a primary concern for many MR fluid applications, it is a primary fluid property for the majority of their commercial and industrial applications and therefore a compromise must be met when considering on-state viscosity, maximum apparent yields stress, and settling rate of an MR fluid.

== Modes of operation ==
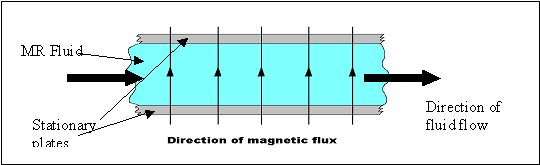
Flow mode (a.k.a. valve mode)

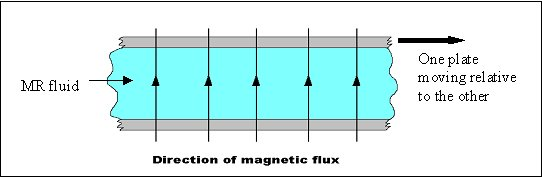
Shear mode

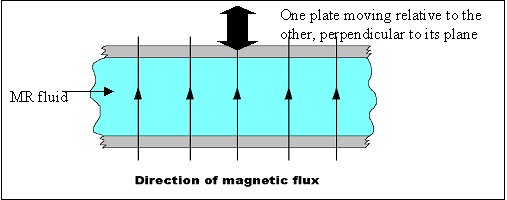
Squeeze-flow mode

An MR fluid is used in one of three main modes of operation, these being flow mode, shear mode and squeeze-flow mode. These modes involve, respectively, fluid flowing as a result of pressure gradient between two stationary plates; fluid between two plates moving relative to one another; and fluid between two plates moving in the direction perpendicular to their planes. In all cases the magnetic field is perpendicular to the planes of the plates, so as to restrict fluid in the direction parallel to the plates.

The applications of these various modes are numerous. Flow mode can be used in dampers and shock absorbers, by using the movement to be controlled to force the fluid through channels, across which a magnetic field is applied. Shear mode is particularly useful in clutches and brakes, in places where rotational motion must be controlled. Squeeze-flow mode, on the other hand, is most suitable for applications controlling small, millimeter-order movements but involving large forces. This particular flow mode has seen the least investigation so far.

== Uses ==
The application set for MR fluids is vast, and it expands with each advance in the dynamics of the fluid.

=== Mechanical engineering ===
Magnetorheological dampers of various applications have been and continue to be developed. These dampers are mainly used in heavy industry with applications such as heavy motor damping, operator seat/cab damping in construction vehicles, and more.

As of 2006, materials scientists and mechanical engineers are collaborating to develop stand-alone seismic dampers which, when positioned anywhere within a building, will operate within the building's resonance frequency, absorbing detrimental shock waves and oscillations within the structure, giving these dampers the ability to make any building earthquake-proof, or at least earthquake-resistant.

MR fluids' technology can applied among high-end auxiliary equipment that has flexible fixtures at CNC machining. It can hold irregular surfaces and difficult-to-grasp products.

=== Military and defense ===
The U.S. Army Research Office is currently funding research into using MR fluid to enhance body armor. In 2003, researchers stated they were five to ten years away from making the fluid bullet resistant. In addition, HMMWVs, and various other all-terrain vehicles employ dynamic MR shock absorbers and/or dampers.

=== Optics ===
Magnetorheological finishing, a magnetorheological fluid-based optical polishing method, has proven to be highly precise. It was used in the construction of the Hubble Space Telescope's corrective lens.

=== Automotive ===
If the shock absorbers of a vehicle's suspension are filled with magnetorheological fluid instead of a plain oil or gas, and the channels which allow the damping fluid to flow between the two chambers are surrounded with electromagnets, the viscosity of the fluid, and hence the critical frequency of the damper, can be varied depending on driver preference or the weight being carried by the vehicle, or it may be dynamically varied in order to provide stability control across vastly different road conditions. This is in effect a magnetorheological damper. For example, the MagneRide active suspension system permits the damping factor to be adjusted once every millisecond in response to conditions. General Motors (in a partnership with Delphi Corporation) has developed this technology for automotive applications. It made its debut in both Cadillac (Seville STS build date on or after 1/15/2002 with RPO F55) as "Magneride" (or "MR") and Chevrolet passenger vehicles (All Corvettes made since 2003 with the F55 option code) as part of the driver selectable "Magnetic Selective Ride Control (MSRC)" system in model year 2003. Other manufacturers have paid for the use of it in their own vehicles, for example Audi and Ferrari offer the MagneRide on various models.

General Motors and other automotive companies are seeking to develop a magnetorheological fluid based clutch system for push-button four wheel drive systems. This clutch system would use electromagnets to solidify the fluid which would lock the driveshaft into the drive train.

Porsche has introduced magnetorheological engine mounts in the 2010 Porsche GT3 and GT2. At high engine revolutions, the magnetorheological engine mounts get stiffer to provide a more precise gearbox shifter feel by reducing the relative motion between the power train and chassis/body.

As of September 2007, Acura (Honda) has begun an advertising campaign highlighting its use of MR technology in passenger vehicles manufactured for the 2007 MDX model year.

=== Aerospace ===
Magnetorheological dampers are under development for use in military and commercial helicopter cockpit seats, as safety devices in the event of a crash. They would be used to decrease the shock delivered to a passenger's spinal column, thereby decreasing the rate of permanent injury during a crash.

=== Medicine ===
Magnetorheological dampers are utilized in semi-active human prosthetic legs. Much like those used in military and commercial helicopters, a damper in the prosthetic leg decreases the shock delivered to the patients leg when jumping, for example. This results in an increased mobility and agility for the patient.

=== Haptic feedback input devices ===
The company XeelTech and CK Materials Lab in Korea use magnetorheological fluid to generate the haptic feedback of their HAPTICORE rotary switches. The MR actuators are primarily used as input devices with adaptive haptic feedback to enable new possibilities in user interface design. The HAPTICORE technology functions like a miniature MR brake. By changing the magnetic field created by a small electromagnet inside the rotary knob, the friction between the outer shell and the stator is modified in such a way that the user perceives the braking effect as haptic feedback.

By modifying the rheological state of the fluid in near real time, a variety of mechanical rotary knob and cam switch haptic patterns such as ticks, grids, and barriers or limits can be simulated. In addition, it is also possible to generate new forms of haptic feedback, such as speed-adaptive and direction-dependent haptic feedback modes. This technology is used, for example, in HMIs of industrial equipment, household appliances or computer peripherals.

== See also ==
- Ferrofluid – Liquid that is attracted by poles of a magnet
- Electrorheological fluid – Type of chemical suspension
- Rheology – Study of the flow of matter, primarily in a fluid state
- Rheometry – Experimental techniques used to study fluid flow (rheology)
