= Smart fluid =

Fluid whose properties can be changed by applying an electric or magnetic field

A smart fluid is a fluid whose properties (e.g. viscosity) can be changed by applying an electric field or a magnetic field.

== History ==
The properties of smart fluids have been known for around sixty years, but were subject to only sporadic investigations up until the 1990s, when they were suddenly the subject of renewed interest, notably culminating with the use of an MR fluid on the suspension of the 2002 model of the Cadillac Seville STS automobile and more recently, on the suspension of the second-generation Audi TT. Other applications include brakes and seismic dampers, which are used in buildings in seismically-active zones to damp the oscillations occurring in an earthquake. Since then it appears that interest has waned a little, possibly due to the existence of various limitations of smart fluids which have yet to be overcome.

== Examples ==
The most developed smart fluids today are fluids whose viscosity increases when a magnetic field is applied. Small magnetic dipoles are suspended in a non-magnetic fluid, and the applied magnetic field causes these small magnets to line up and form strings that increase the viscosity. These magnetorheological or MR fluids have been used in the suspension of the 2002 model of the Cadillac Seville STS automobile and more recently, in the suspension of the second-generation Audi TT. Depending on road conditions, the fluid's damping viscosity can be adjusted. This is more expensive than traditional systems, but it provides better (faster) control. Similar systems are being explored to reduce vibration in washing machines, air conditioning compressors, rockets and satellites, and one has even been installed in Japan's National Museum of Emerging Science and Innovation in Tokyo as an earthquake shock absorber.

Some haptic devices whose resistance to touch can be controlled are also based on these MR fluids.

Another major type of smart fluid are electrorheological or ER fluids, whose resistance to flow can be quickly and dramatically altered by an applied electric field (note, the yield stress point is altered rather than the viscosity). Besides fast acting clutches, brakes, shock absorbers and hydraulic valves, other, more esoteric, applications such as bulletproof vests have been proposed for these fluids.

Other smart fluids change their surface tension in the presence of an electric field. This has been used to produce very small controllable lenses: a drop of this fluid, captured in a small cylinder and surrounded by oil, serves as a lens whose shape can be changed by applying an electric field.

== See also ==
- Continuum mechanics – Branch of physics which studies the behavior of materials modeled as continuous media
- Electrorheological fluid – type of chemical suspension
- Ferrofluid – Liquid that is attracted by poles of a magnet
- Fluid mechanics – Branch of physics
- Magnetorheological fluid – Type of smart fluid in a carrier fluid
- Rheology – Study of the flow of matter, primarily in a fluid state
- Smart glass – Glass with electrically switchable opacity
- Smart metal – Alloy which returns to a preset shape when heated
