= Hydraulic manifold =

Component in hydraulic system

A hydraulic manifold is a component that regulates fluid flow between pumps and actuators and other components in a hydraulic system. It is like a switchboard in an electrical circuit because it lets the operator control how much fluid flows between which components of a hydraulic machinery. For example, in a backhoe loader a manifold turns on or shuts off or diverts flow to the telescopic arms of the front bucket and the back bucket. The manifold is connected to the levers in the operator's cabin which the operator uses to achieve the desired manifold behaviour.

A manifold is composed of assorted hydraulic valves connected to each other. It is the various combinations of states of these valves that allow complex control behaviour in a manifold. A hydraulic manifold is a block of metal with flow paths drilled through it, connecting various ports. Hydraulic manifolds consist of one or more relative large pipes called a "barrel" or "main", with numerous junctions connecting smaller pipes and ports.

== See also ==
- Block and bleed manifold
