= BeijingWest Industries =

Chinese automotive parts company

BWI Group
- Native name: 京西重工国际
- Type: Incorporated
- Industry: Automotive
- Founded: 2009 in Beijing, China
- Headquarters: Beijing, China
- Products: Suspension and braking systems
- Website: bwigroup.com

BWI Group is a supplier of brake and suspension systems headquartered in Beijing, China. The company acquired the Chassis Division of Delphi on November 1, 2009. The brake and suspension business lines were purchased for approximately $100 million. The company supplies to automotive, motorcycle, and specialty vehicle manufacturers. BWI Group is an international supplier with manufacturing facilities located in China, Poland, the United Kingdom, the Czech Republic and Mexico.

== History ==
- 1909: Dayton Engineering Laboratories Co.
- 1918: Delco Products
- 1923: Moraine Products and Inland
- 1929: Delco Appliance Rochester
- 1936: Delco Brake
- 1969: Saginaw Manufacturing
- 1991: Delco Chassis
- 1995: Delphi Chassis Systems
- 2009: BWI Group

== Products ==
BWI Group's product history:

- 1920s: began to manufacture shock absorbers.
- 1930s: introduced their drum brake master cylinder
- 1940s: the all-welded shock absorber was introduced
- 1960s: the vacuum booster, disc brake and the air adjustable shock became part of the product line
- 1970s: the brake corner, suspension strut, aluminum master cylinder, and cast iron knuckle added more to the product offerings
- 1980s: Innovative products were offered, such as: ABS (anti-lock braking system), strut modules, and selectable ride
- 1990s: More innovations came in the 1990s with products like: ESC, Real Time Damping, Integrated Chassis, and Aluminum Knuckles. The de Carbon brand was also acquired during this time.
- 2000s: MagneRide became one of the company's top brands and ABS applications for motorcycles were also introduced.
