= Subaru Outback =

Station wagon produced by Subaru

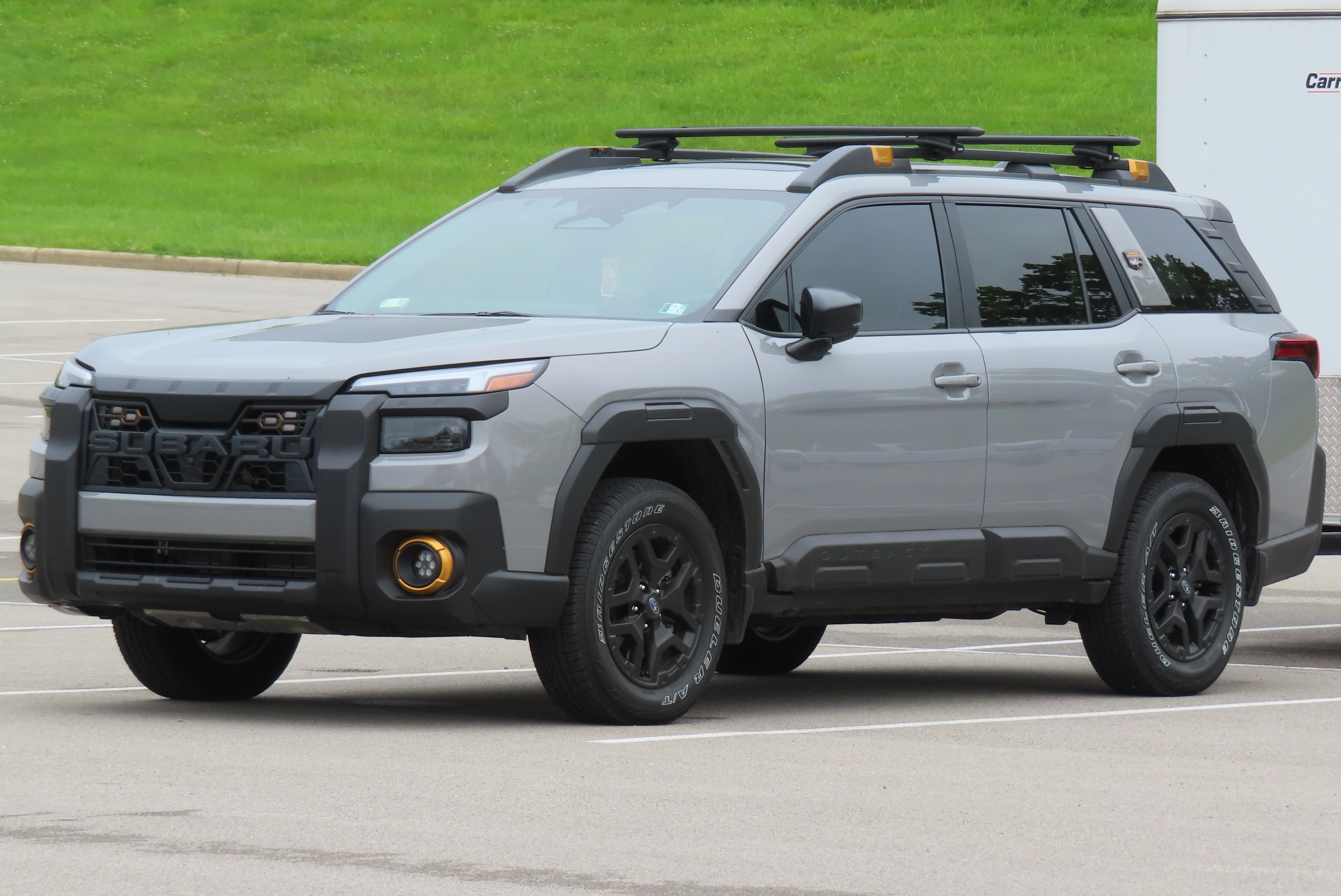
- 2026 Subaru Outback Wilderness

Overview
- Manufacturer: Subaru
- Also called: Subaru Legacy Outback
- Production: 1994–present
- Model years: 1995–present
- Assembly: Japan: Ota, Gunma; United States: Lafayette, Indiana (Lafayette Plant, 1999–2025)

Body and chassis
- Class: Mid-size car (D) (1994–2025); Mid-size crossover SUV (2025–present)
- Body style: 5-door station wagon (1994–2025); 5-door SUV (2025–present)

The Subaru Outback is an automotive nameplate used by the Japanese automaker Subaru for two different themed vehicles: a Legacy-derived station wagon, the Outback (1994–present, also sold as Legacy Outback (Japanese: スバル・レガシィアウトバック, Hepburn: Subaru Regashi Autobakku) in some markets), and an Impreza-derived off-road themed hatchback, the Outback Sport (1994–2011).

Most versions of the Outback wagon and Outback Sport have had all-wheel drive as standard equipment.

== History ==
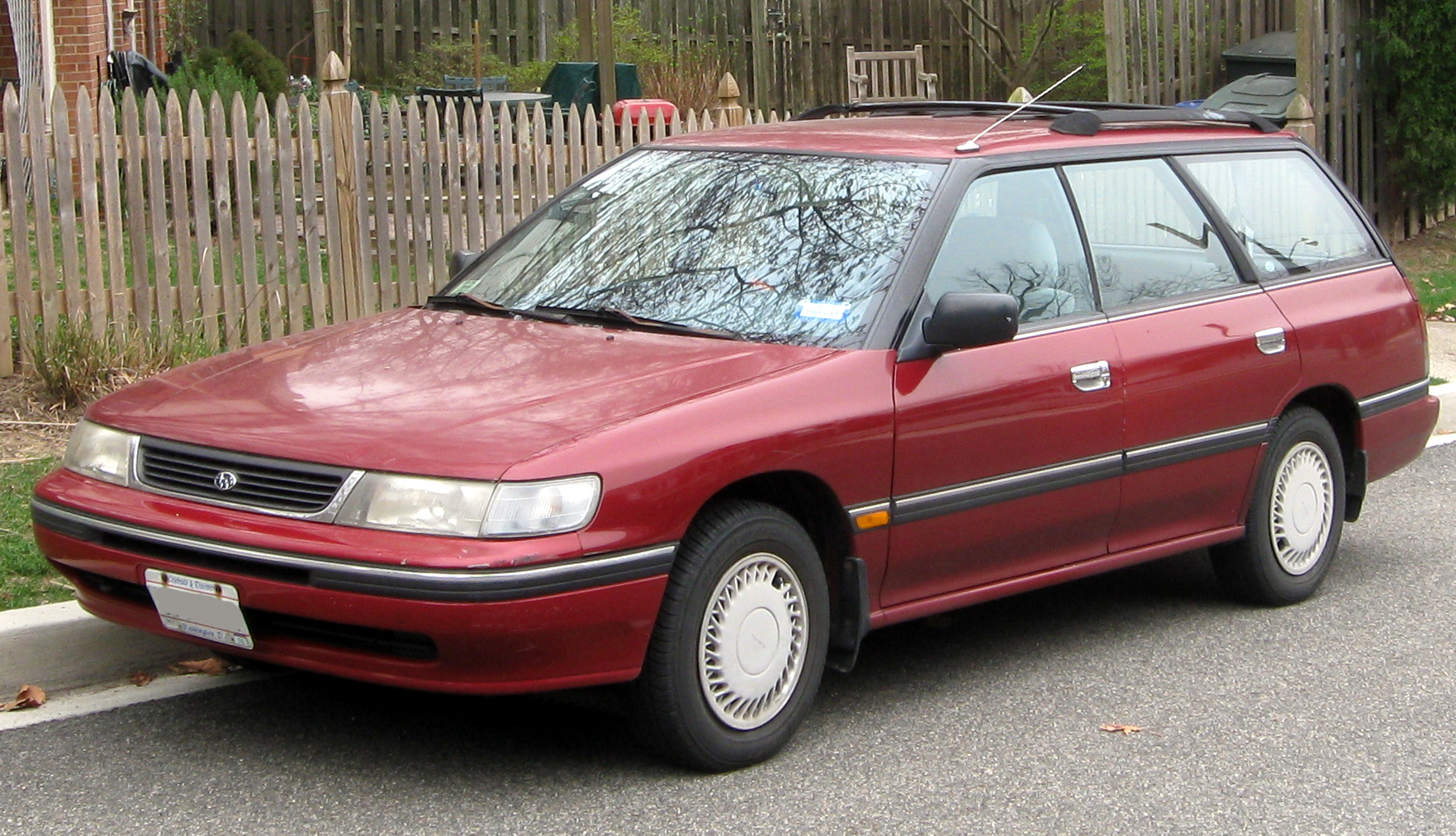

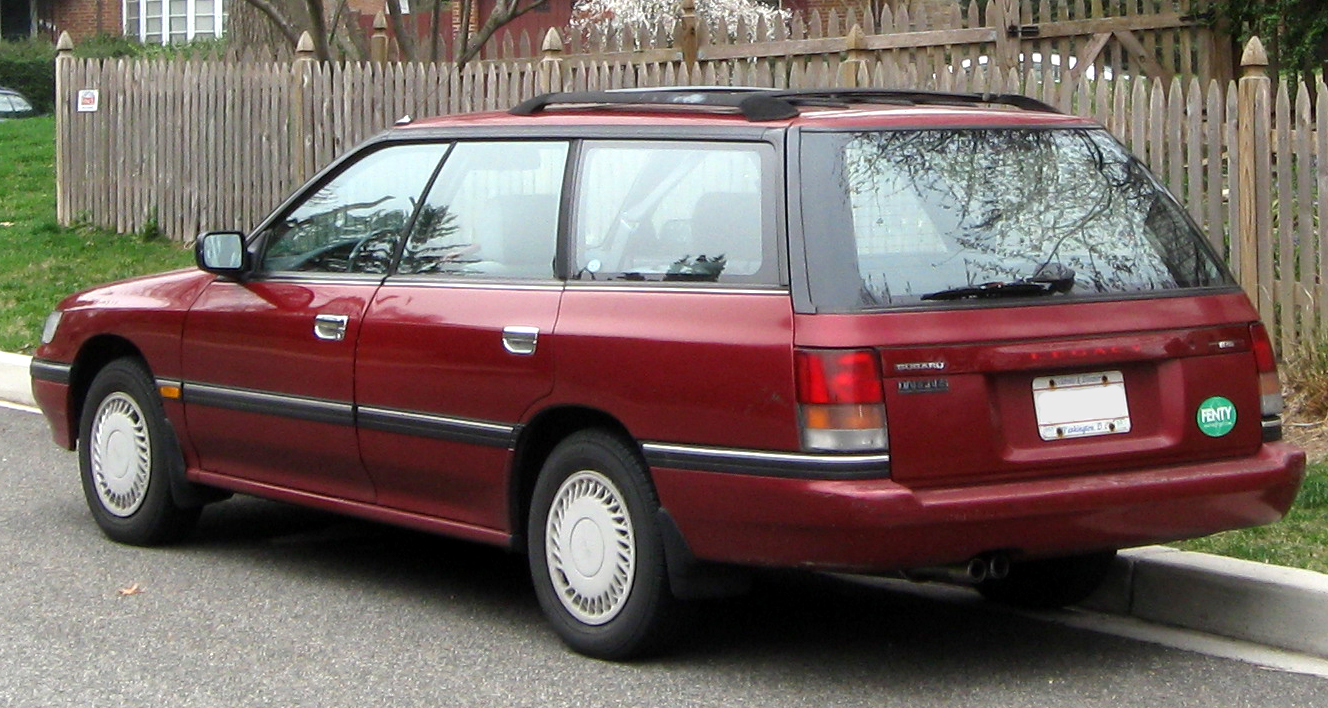
First generation Subaru Legacy station wagon (1989–1993), before the model gained the "Outback" name

The original Outback station wagon was derived from the wagon variant of the second-generation Subaru Legacy. The first-generation Legacy, which made its debut in 1989, did not receive the cosmetic and suspension modifications to create an Outback version, although Subaru offered an Outdoor option package for the 1994 model year Legacy L all-wheel drive model, which added a compressed air strut height adjustable suspension, a luggage rack, a skidplate, and mud flaps.

Earlier, a raised-roof "Touring Wagon" variant had been offered on the preceding Subaru Leone for the 1988 and 1989 model years. Subaru also sold a raised-roof variant (chassis code BF) of the first-generation Legacy wagon outside the United States. North American Legacy wagons were only offered as the flat-roof variant (chassis code BJ) until a special "GT" model was marketed for the 1994 model year.

The second-generation Legacy wagon became the first generation of the Outback crossover series, called the "Legacy Grand Wagon" in Japan in 1995, and the "Legacy Outback" in most other markets. Compared to the existing Legacy wagon, the "Outback" variant added partial protective plastic side body cladding for off-road conditions, used a raised roof, and would later raise the suspension to provide additional ground clearance. It was introduced at the 1994 New York Auto Show. Aside from other small differences in trim, the Outback shares almost all of its components with the Legacy donor model.

When launched in Australia in 1996, the name "Legacy Outback" was shortened to "Outback", followed in other markets afterwards. In the United States, Subaru also retailed the Legacy SUS sedan between the 1997 and 2007 model years, with similar modifications to distinguish it from the equivalent Legacy model sedan. The Impreza Outback Sport was introduced at the 1996 New York Auto Show, but for the 1997 model year, the donor model names were dropped, and the cars were known as the "Outback" and "Outback Sport".

Subaru Outback model codes
Gen	Calendar years	Sedan	Station wagon/crossover SUV
1	1994–1999	BD	BG
2	1999–2004	BE	BH
3	2003–2009	BL	BP
4	2009–2014	BM	BR
5	2014–2019	BN	BS
6	2019–2025	BW	BT
7	2025-	—	BU

== First generation (BD/BG/BK; 1994) ==
First generation
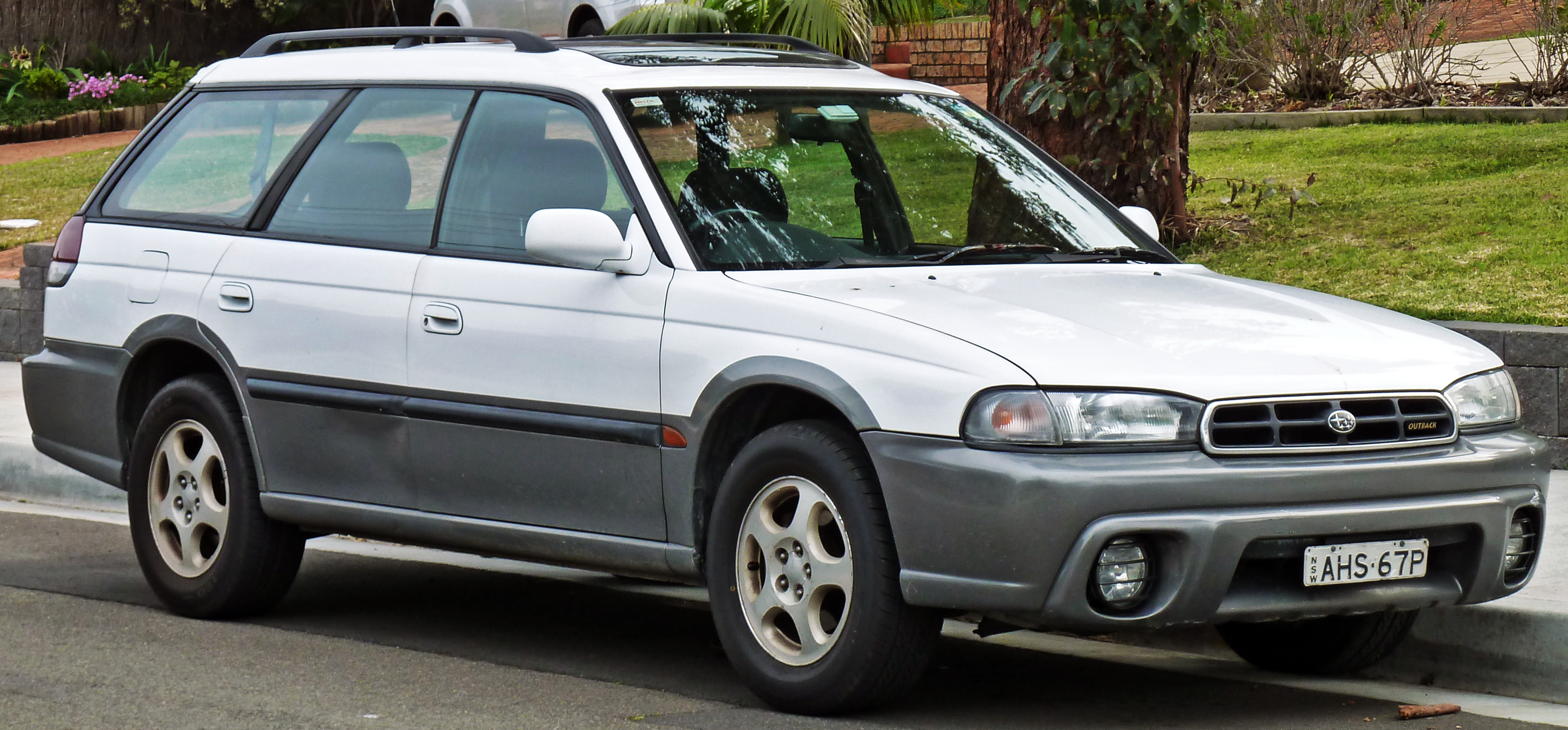

Overview
- Model code: BD; BG; BK
- Also called: Subaru Legacy Grand Wagon; Subaru Legacy Lancaster (1999 model year)
- Production: 1994–1999
- Model years: 1995–1999

Body and chassis
- Body style: 5-door station wagon 4-door sedan (US)

Powertrain
- Engine: 2.2 L EJ22 SOHC H4; 2.5 L EJ25D DOHC H4
- Transmission: 4-speed automatic 5-speed manual

Dimensions
- Wheelbase: 2,629 mm (103.5 in)
- Length: 4,719 mm (185.8 in)
- Width: 1,714 mm (67.5 in) (Int'l); 1,694 mm (66.7 in) (Japan)
- Height: 1,600.2 mm (63 in)

The Outback concept originated with Subaru of America, which was suffering from slumping sales in the mid-1990s partly due to a lack of an entry in the then-burgeoning sport utility vehicle market. Lacking the finances to design an all-new vehicle, Subaru decided to add body cladding and a suspension lift to their Legacy wagon. Named the Legacy Outback, after the Australian outback, actor Paul Hogan was the spokesman in the North American market, playing off the Australian name of the vehicle and portraying the vehicle as a capable and more efficient alternative to large, truck-based SUVs. Sales exceeded expectations, with Tim Mahoney, Senior Vice President of Subaru of America stating "[the Outback] saved our company."

From the beginning, the new model was known in Australia as the Outback and in Japan starting August 1995 as the Legacy Grand Wagon; the "Grand Wagon" nomenclature was meant to signify a more grand, luxurious vehicle compared to the standard Japanese model, which at that time was known as the Legacy Touring Wagon.

The Legacy Outback was formally introduced to the North American market at the 1994 New York Auto Show for the 1995 model year. Initially, the Outback was a trim package on the base-model Legacy L wagon, which meant that its standard equipment list included heavy cloth interior, Berber carpet floor mats, and a luggage rack, among other features. This approach was also used on the smaller Impreza wagon, with the name Outback Sport. The only engine available initially was a 2.2-liter flat-four producing 135 hp (101 kW); this was replaced by a 2.5-liter twin-cam engine with 155 hp (116 kW) for model year 1996. For the next year, power went up to 165 hp (123 kW).

The debut Outback retained the ground clearance of the standard Legacy wagon but differentiated itself visually with details like a two-tone paint job and fog lights, which helped suggest a more rugged aesthetic. The exterior was designed by Olivier Boulay, who was hired by Subaru on a short-term basis.

When the 1996 model year arrived, it gained more aggressive appearing front bumper covers, with larger rallye-inspired driving lamps replacing the previously installed fog lights, taller tires with more aggressive tread, and a 7.8 in (198 mm) ground clearance, with a 7.87 in (200 mm) ground clearance in Japan. The more aggressive appearance was also used on the smaller Outback Sport while omitting the increase in ground clearance from suspension modification. This approach was inspired by the Legacy having been entered into international rallying and long distance racing events, and winning the 1990 Safari Rally in the Group N category. In 1996, the MY1997 Outback received the hood scoop (bonnet) but no accompanying performance modifications commonly suggested by such a design feature.

The previous generation Legacy wagon had an optional air suspension, which allowed the driver to temporarily increase the vehicle's ground clearance, however the permanent increased ride height used on the Outback proved to be more practical. Subaru sales had been declining up until that point in North American market. With the help of clever marketing, a trim level called the Outback intent on making the Subaru a more capable multi-terrain vehicle offered an affordable and fuel efficient alternative to the popular SUVs that were outselling Subaru's traditional offerings. The Legacy and Outback wagons were built at the Subaru of Indiana Automotive production facility in Lafayette, Indiana that also manufactured the Isuzu Rodeo and the badge engineered Honda Passport, traditional SUVs with a transfer case, four-wheel-drive and an extended ground clearance.

In September 1997, the Japanese Legacy Grand Wagon was renamed Legacy Lancaster though 1998 cars retained the Grand Wagon nameplate along with the new Lancaster plate. Earlier versions of the Outback continued to use the EJ22 four cylinder engine, while later generations introduced the larger EJ25 four cylinder engine, revised with DOHC and more horsepower. The JDM Grand Wagon and Lancaster were only available with the DOHC 2.5-litre flat-4 engine, receiving a 10 hp (7.5 kW) improvement in 1998. Some Japanese-spec Grand Wagons came with digital climate control, plaid seat upholstery, a dual-range manual transmission and a Momo black leather steering wheel.

All trim levels retained the typical AWD layouts seen in previous generation Legacy, depending on transmission choice. Manual transmission models came with a mechanical "Continuous AWD" system which was normally 50/50 front/rear, and relied on limited-slip differentials to redirect power front to rear, rear to front, and from one rear wheel to the other (when fitted with a rear limited-slip differential). – No US-spec Legacy models had front or rear limited-slip differential from '92–99 – including Outback versions. Automatic transmission models had an electronically-controlled AWD system that was 90/10 front/rear and redirected differing amounts of power to the rear wheels continuously. When accelerating or driving uphill, the vehicles weight shifts rearward, reducing front wheel traction, causing the transmission to automatically send torque to the rear wheels to compensate. When braking or driving downhill, the vehicle's weight shifts towards the front, reducing rear wheel traction. The transmission again compensates by sending torque to the front wheels for better steering control and braking performance. If the automatic is placed in Reverse or "1st" gear, the transmission divides the torque 50–50 to both front and rear wheels.

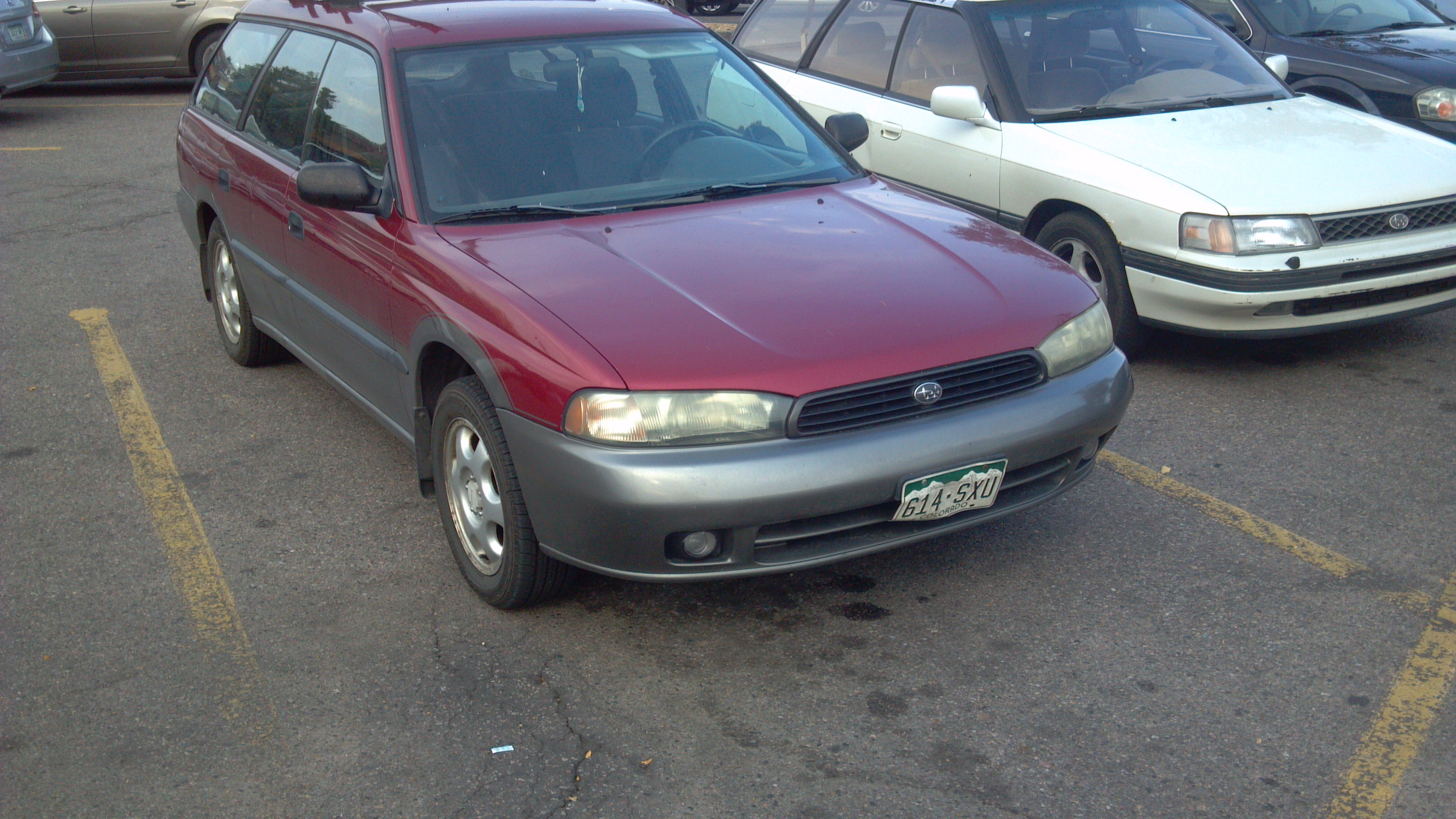
1995 Subaru Legacy Outback

1998 Subaru Legacy Grandwagon Lancaster Limited

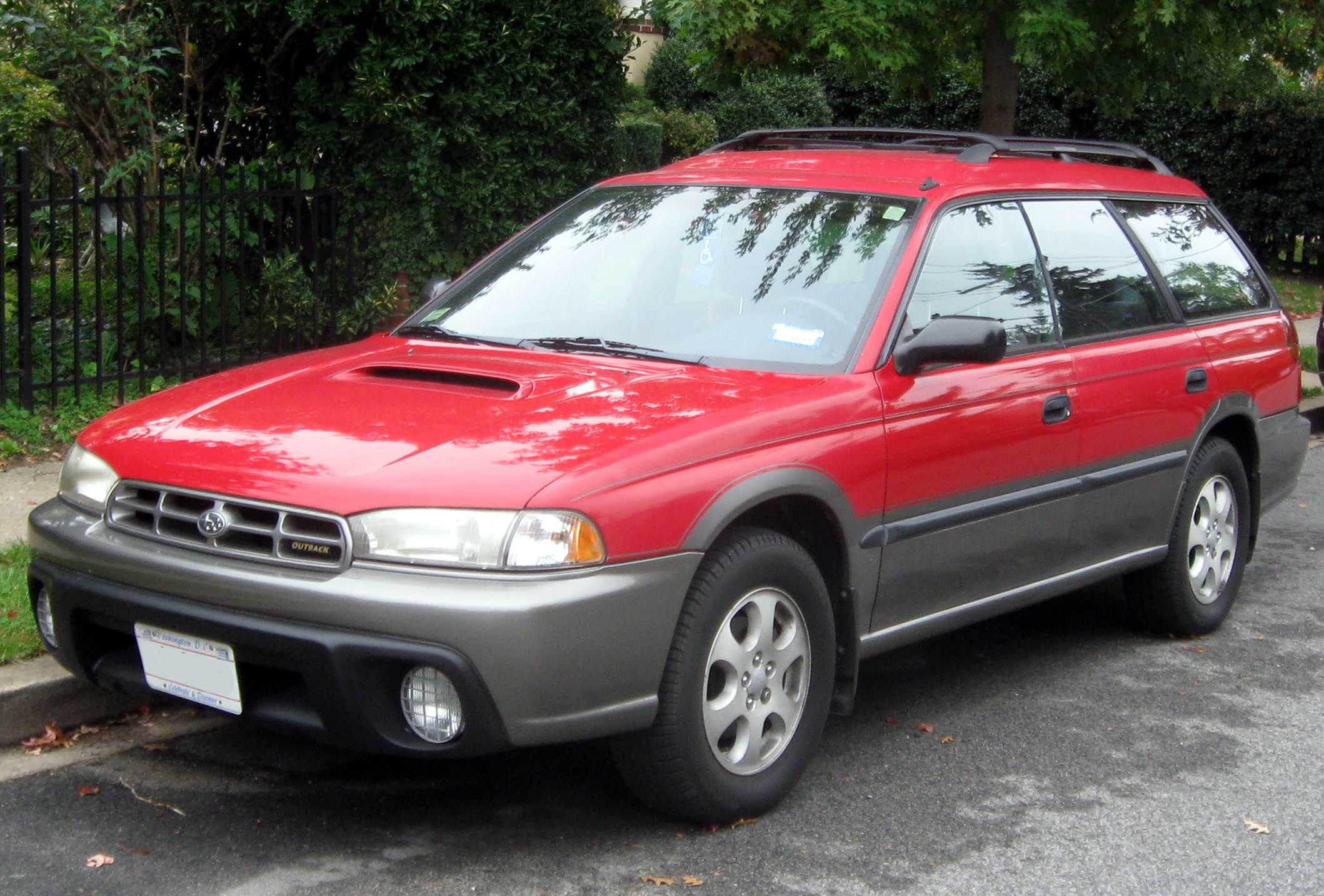
Subaru Legacy Outback

=== Legacy SUS ===
The Legacy SUS (short for "Sport Utility Sedan") was launched with a limited production test run sold in US in 1998 and, based on its success, was rolled out in North America only the following year. The "Limited" trim level package for the Outback wagon was standard equipment on the sedan body, with the addition of a hood scoop and trunk-mounted rear wing. Despite the appearance of the front hood scoop, the SUS was not installed with a turbocharged engine; the only engine installed from Subaru was the naturally aspirated EJ25D engine. The "SUS" moniker was removed with the introduction of the second generation Outback Sedan. Plastic side cladding was not present on the side doors of the Outback; the lower half of the doors were painted a contrasting color also found on the front and rear bumper covers.

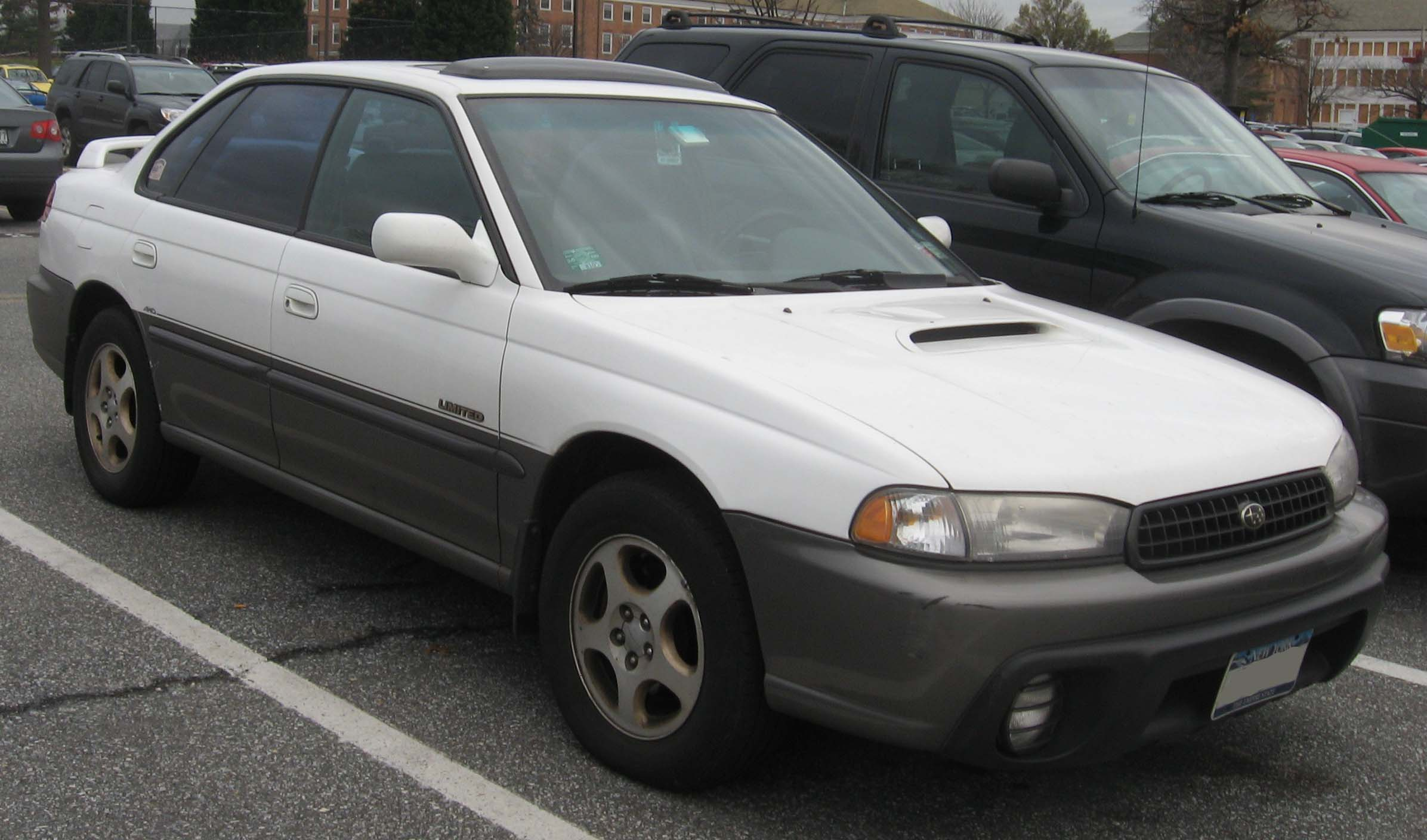
Legacy SUS Limited

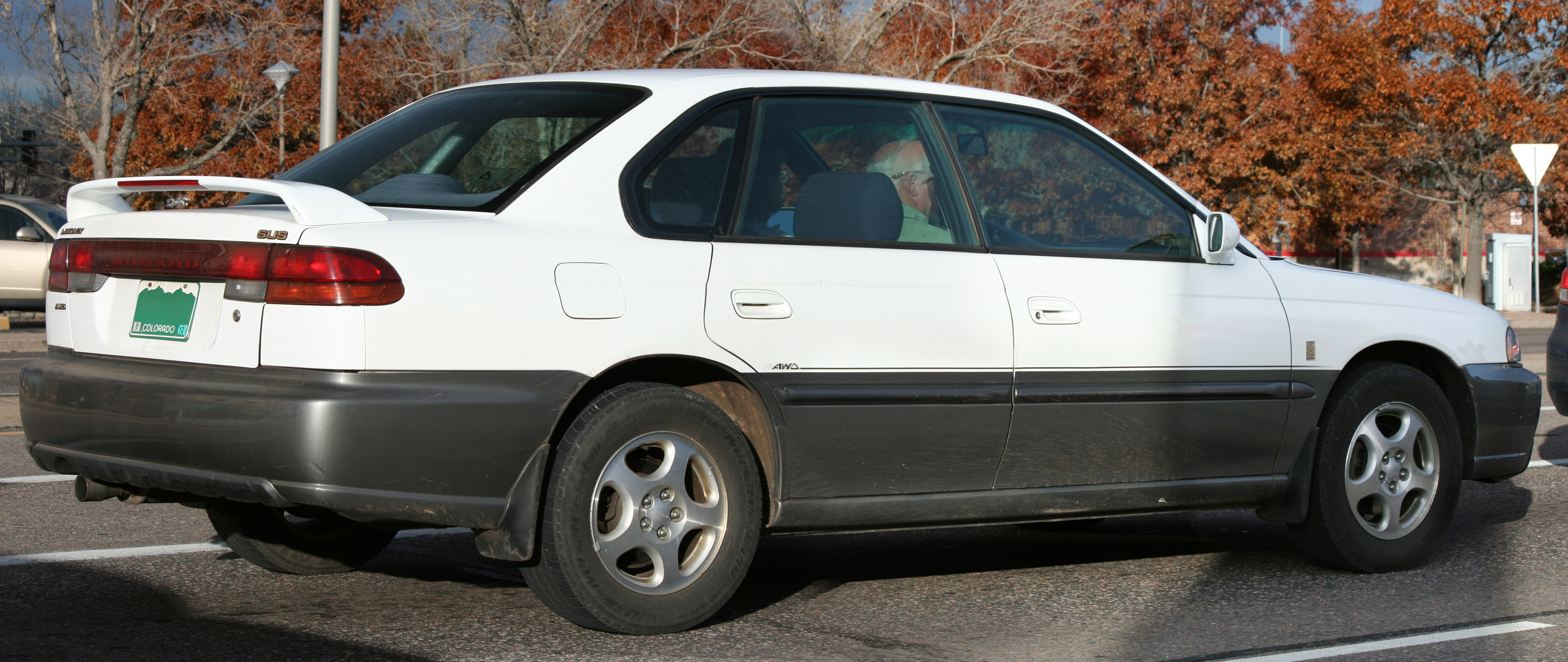
Legacy SUS (rear view)

== Second generation (BE/BH; 1999) ==
Second generation
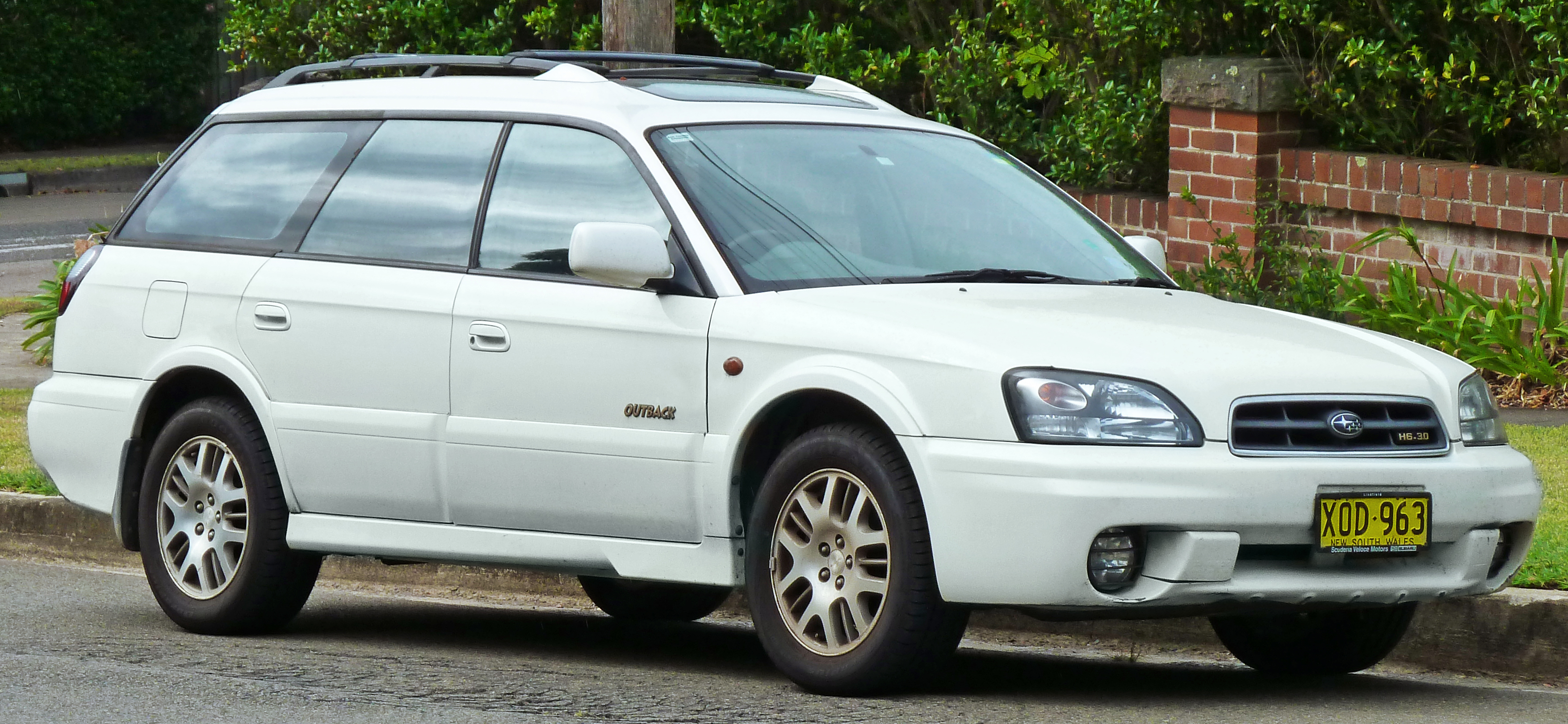

Overview
- Model code: BE (sedan); BH (wagon)
- Also called: Subaru Legacy Lancaster (Japan); Subaru Legacy Outback (Europe)
- Production: 1999–2004
- Model years: 2000–2004

Body and chassis
- Body style: 5-door station wagon 4-door sedan (US only)

Powertrain
- Engine: 2.5 L SOHC 165 hp (123 kW) H4; 3.0 L DOHC 212 hp (158 kW) H6
- Transmission: 4-speed automatic 5-speed manual

Dimensions
- Wheelbase: 2,649 mm (104.3 in)
- Length: 4,760.0 mm (187.4 in) (wagon); 4,683.8 mm (184.4 in) (sedan)
- Width: 1,745 mm (68.7 in) (Int'l); 1,694 mm (66.7 in) (Japan)
- Height: 1,607.8 mm (63.3 in) (2000–02 wagon); 1,579.9 mm (62.2 in) (2003–04 wagon); 1,480.8 mm (58.3 in) (sedan)

With the arrival of the third generation Legacy, the second generation Outback wagon became its own model. The Legacy SUS remained unique to North America and was realigned with the Outback Limited package, offering the sedan with an optional horizontal six-cylinder engine, also optional on the wagon. The new body style was introduced to Japan in September 1998 and called the Lancaster. The US-spec Outback was available starting in 2000. In October 2000, Nissan introduced a Japan-only called competitor with an Outback-like appearance called the Nissan Avenir Blaster.

The raised roof was retained, but the new body was smoother, rounder, and about 3 inches longer, with a slightly longer wheelbase. A new version of Subaru's flat four-cylinder "boxer" engine was standard, offering more low-end torque, better fuel economy, and smoother performance. There were no changes to the front suspension, but there was a complete makeover of the rear suspension, which included a new design that occupied less of the backspace, adding more room in the trunk and cargo floor. Safety improvements consist of three-point seat belts for the driver and additional four passengers. There is also a child-safety-seat anchor for all of the seat positions in the back. For the front, the seat belts are positioned to better hold the driver and front passenger along with front and rear airbags installed to protect the occupants in a collision. The Subaru Outback received a good rating from The Insurance Institute for Highway Safety in 2000 for its performance in a safety demonstration of a crash test at 40 miles per hour. The Outback has been since developing to make it as safe, smooth, and convenient a ride that it can be.

The rear seat on the Outback sedan does not fold down, unlike previous generations where the rear seat had a 60:40 folding seat for extended length items. Rear headrests were included as standard equipment on all trim levels. The ground clearance is 7.3 in (190 mm). The engine was able to meet California's LEV emission standard.

The Outback came standard with a 165 hp (123 kW) by SAE, 4-cylinder boxer engine, four-cylinder SOHC design with a maximum torque of (166 lb⋅ft (225 N⋅m)) that was available at a lower RPM compared to the previous generation. The 2.5 L SOHC four-cylinder engine uses a timing belt that must be replaced around 100,000 miles (160,000 km), whereas the 3.0 L six-cylinder engine uses a timing chain that does not require replacement under normal conditions.

The base model six-cylinder was offered as the H6-3.0 — its interior, and available options, were identical to those of the Outback "Limited", with the exception of a manual transmission, although many successful non-factory transmission swaps have proven that it physically bolts up without issue (but still requires some significant modifications to the electrical system). Badging for all 6-cylinder Outbacks was located on the front grille as well as on the rear of the vehicle.

In a higher trim level, known as the Outback H6-3.0 L.L. Bean in the US, it included standard features like an in-dash six-disc CD changer, automatic climate control, leather upholstery, and dual moonroofs. OnStar was available as an option on the US-spec L.L. Bean and VDC trims. In-dash satellite navigation was offered on Japan-spec vehicles on upper trim level wagons starting with Model Year 1998 and continued to offer a Momo black leather steering wheel with genuine wood inlay, shift knob, and parking brake handle. Plaid upholstery was still offered on Japan-spec Lancasters.

The six-cylinder was also available as the Outback H6-3.0 VDC; a 200 Watt McIntosh stereo system was standard from 2001 to 2004 with Subaru's VDC (Vehicle Dynamics Control) system, which integrated stability control with traction control. These were some of the only vehicles ever factory-equipped with McIntosh stereo equipment. The system was also mated to a previously used Japanese-market AWD system, called VTD, in which power was split 45/55 front-to-rear in normal conditions. When wheel spin is detected, the system cuts power to the spinning wheel and directs power to those that are not. Only when necessary do the brakes slow the affected wheels, when the vehicle detects excessive oversteer or understeer. This package had more sound insulation than other trims, as well as those features found on the H6-3.0 L.L. Bean, such as dual moonroofs, OnStar, and leather upholstery. Its curb weight was just slightly higher than that of the standard H6-3.0 L.L. Bean trim, and while the VDC badging was placed on the front quarter panels only, the H6-3.0 and Outback markings were also applied as usual.

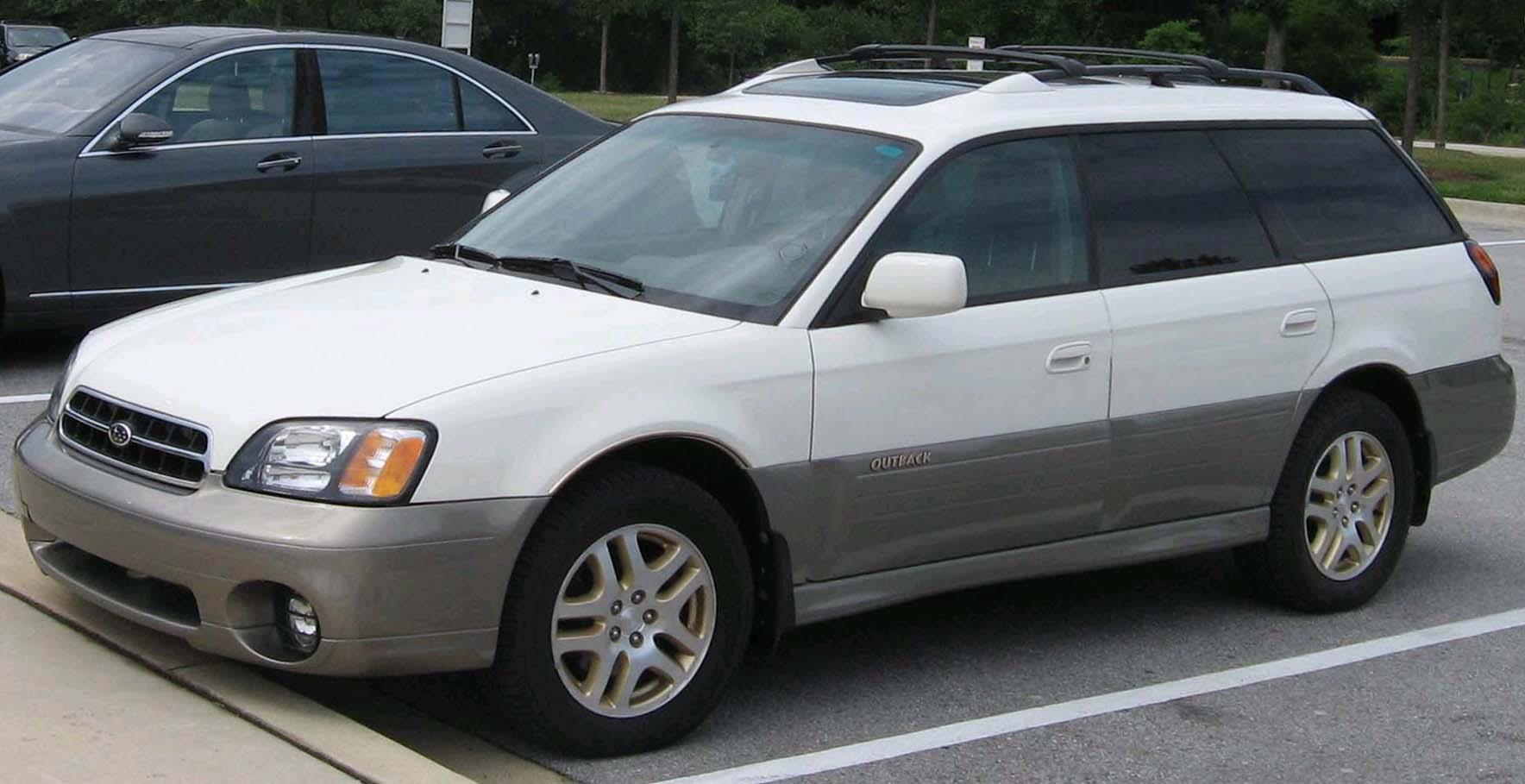
2000–2002 Subaru Outback Limited wagon

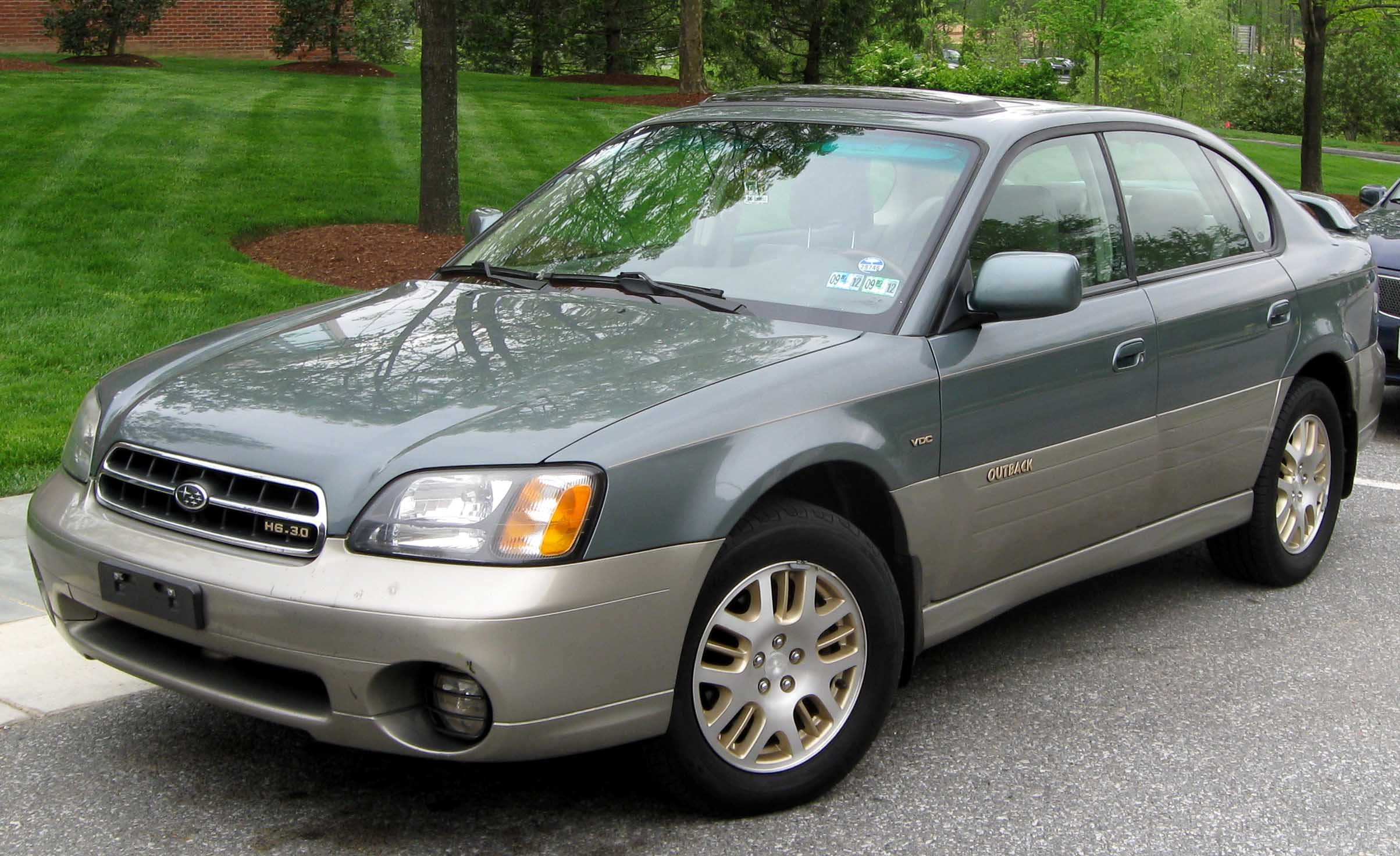
2002 Subaru Outback H6-3.0 VDC sedan

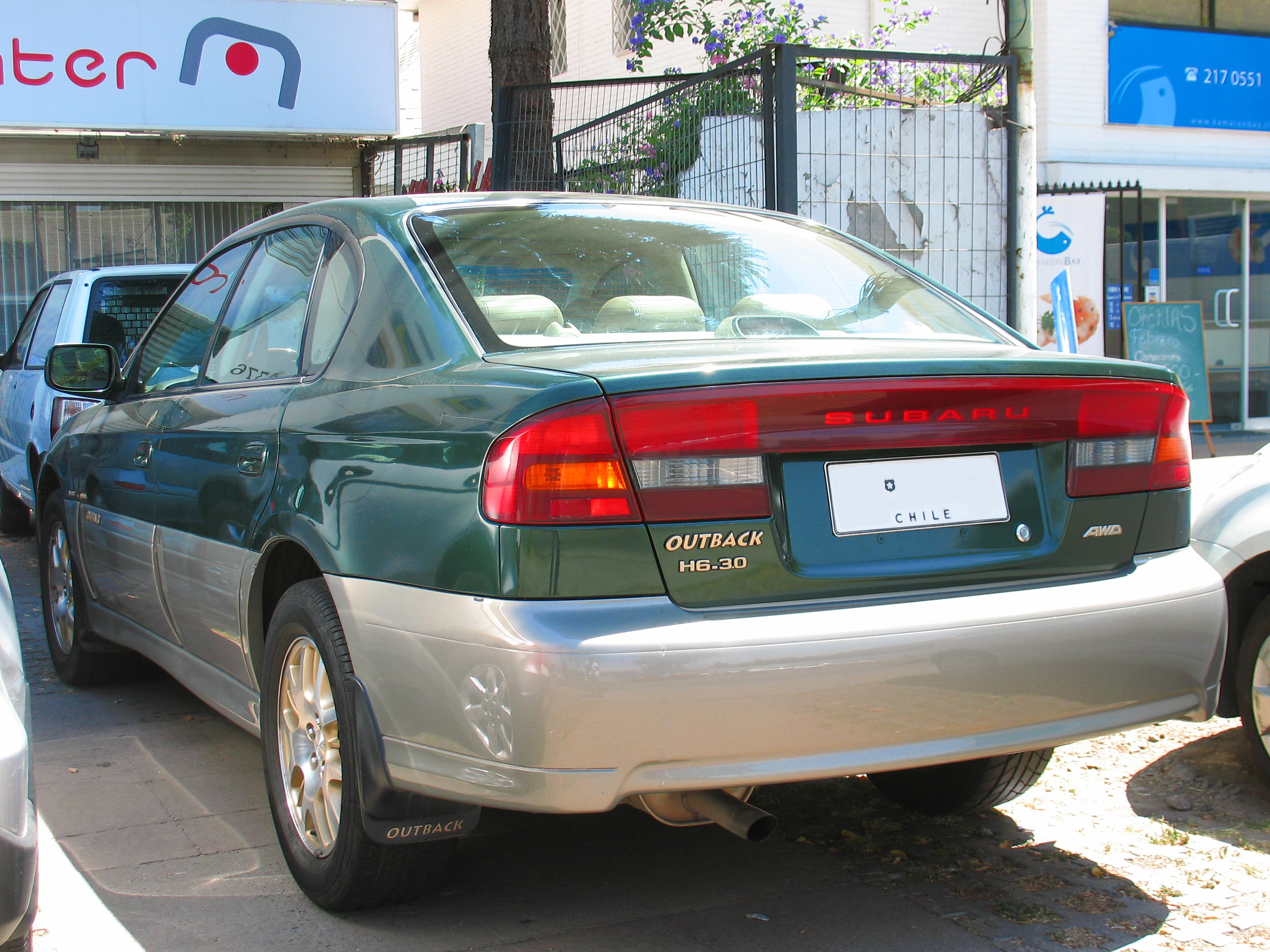
2002 Subaru Outback H6-3.0 sedan

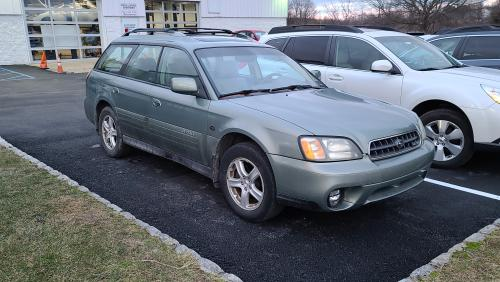
2004 Subaru Outback H6-3.0 L.L. Bean wagon

=== Australia ===
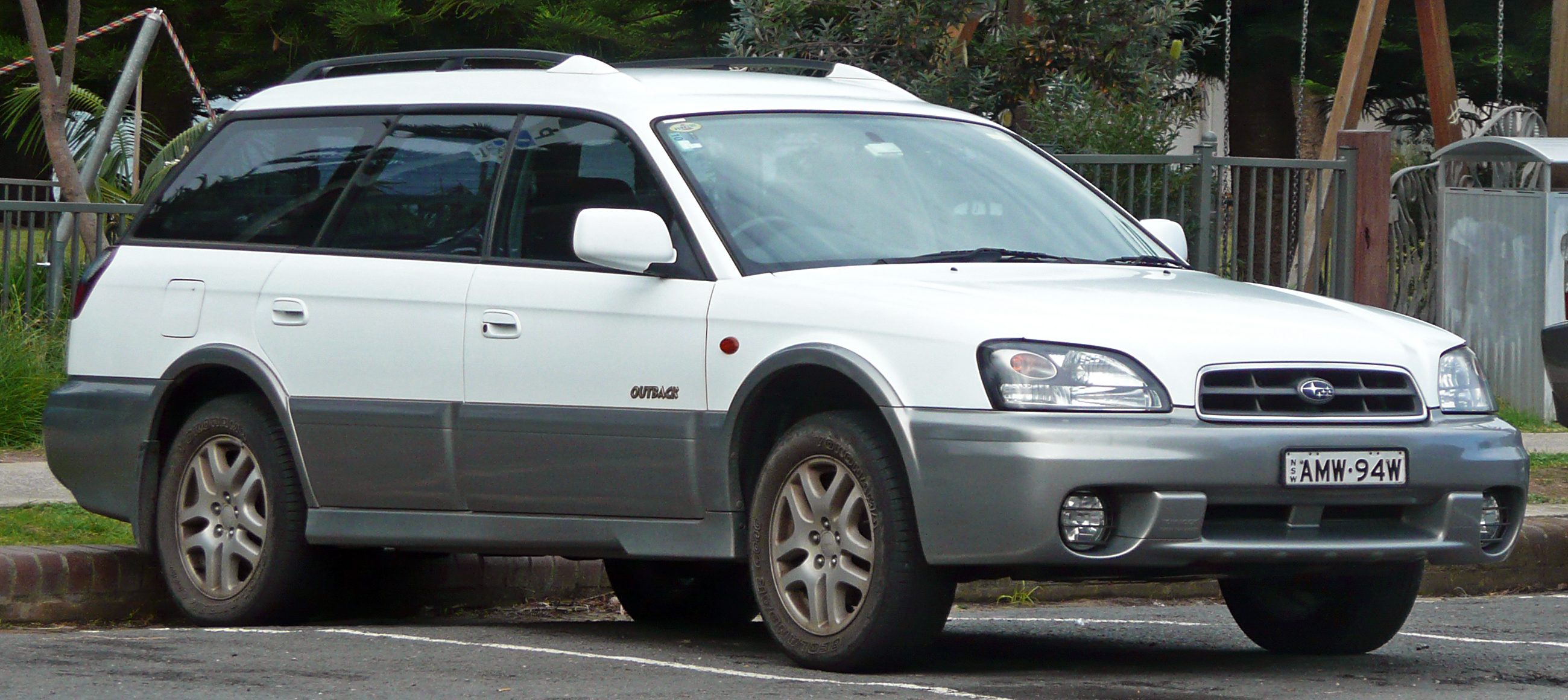
2002–2003 Subaru Outback 2.5 wagon

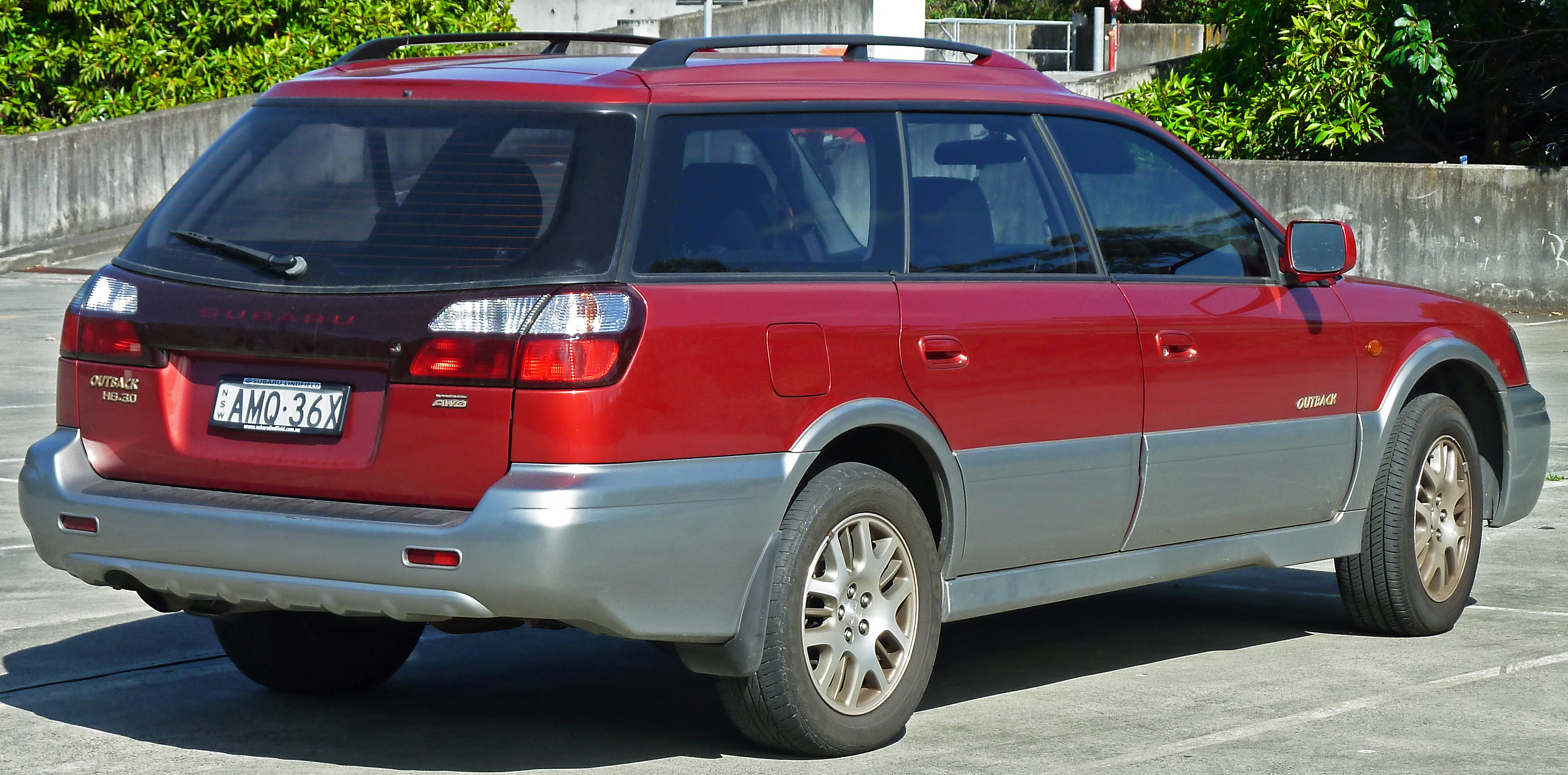
2002–2003 Subaru Outback H6 3.0 wagon

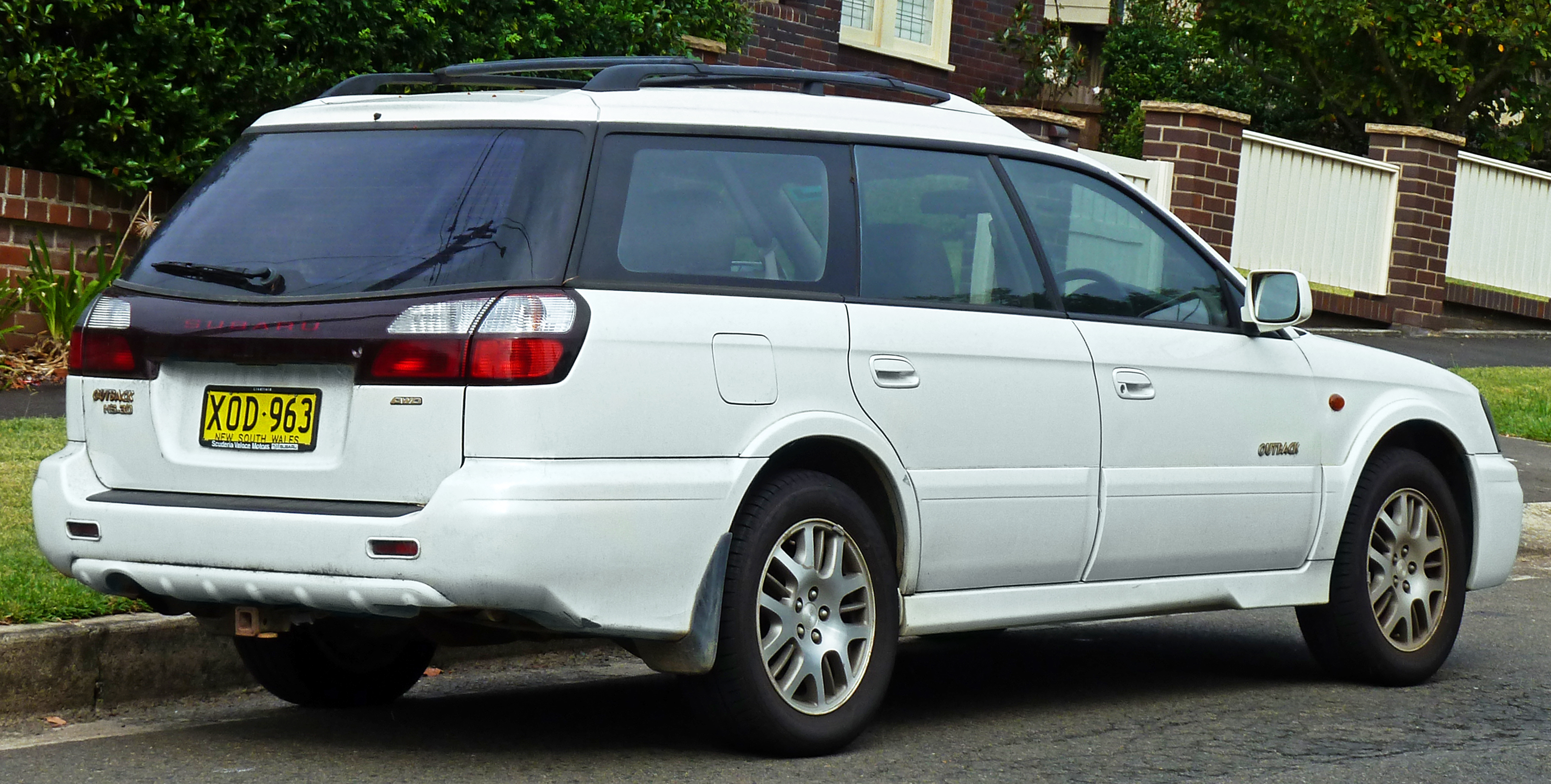
2001–2002 Subaru Outback H6 3.0 wagon

Australian-specification vehicles differ from cars delivered in the United States by following the Japanese models; primarily headlights, side indicators (on front quarter panels), rear taillights, front and rear bumpers, and a higher placing of the "Outback" badging on the front door bodywork (as opposed to being placed on the plastic cladding).

This generation of Outback was released in an early style with gold-colored cladding, all-in-one headlights (not dissimilar to the US model headlights), and internally a light gray cloth (sometimes speckled with various colors), a light brown wood textured dashboard and a plain instrument cluster. A nudge bar (a smaller style of bullbar or roo bar) was also available as an aftermarket option. The later style (2002–2004) was updated with silver cladding, an updated range of paint colors, multi-unit headlights (where headlight and indicators were in different sections of the unit) and internally a dark gray/black cloth, dark gray plastics, a very dark brown faint wood texture, and metal trims on the dials of the instrument cluster.

Models available included the base "Outback", the "Outback Limited" which added a sunroof and cloth/leather seats and the "Outback H6" which included the 6-cylinder engine with VDC as described in this article. The H6 was released with slightly different 16-inch wheels and available in a single metallic pearl off-white color instead of the usual color with gold or silver cladding. The H6 was only available in automatic, apparently due to the size of the 6-cylinder engine taking up too much space to fit the manual box and associated dual-range mechanicals.

=== Japan ===
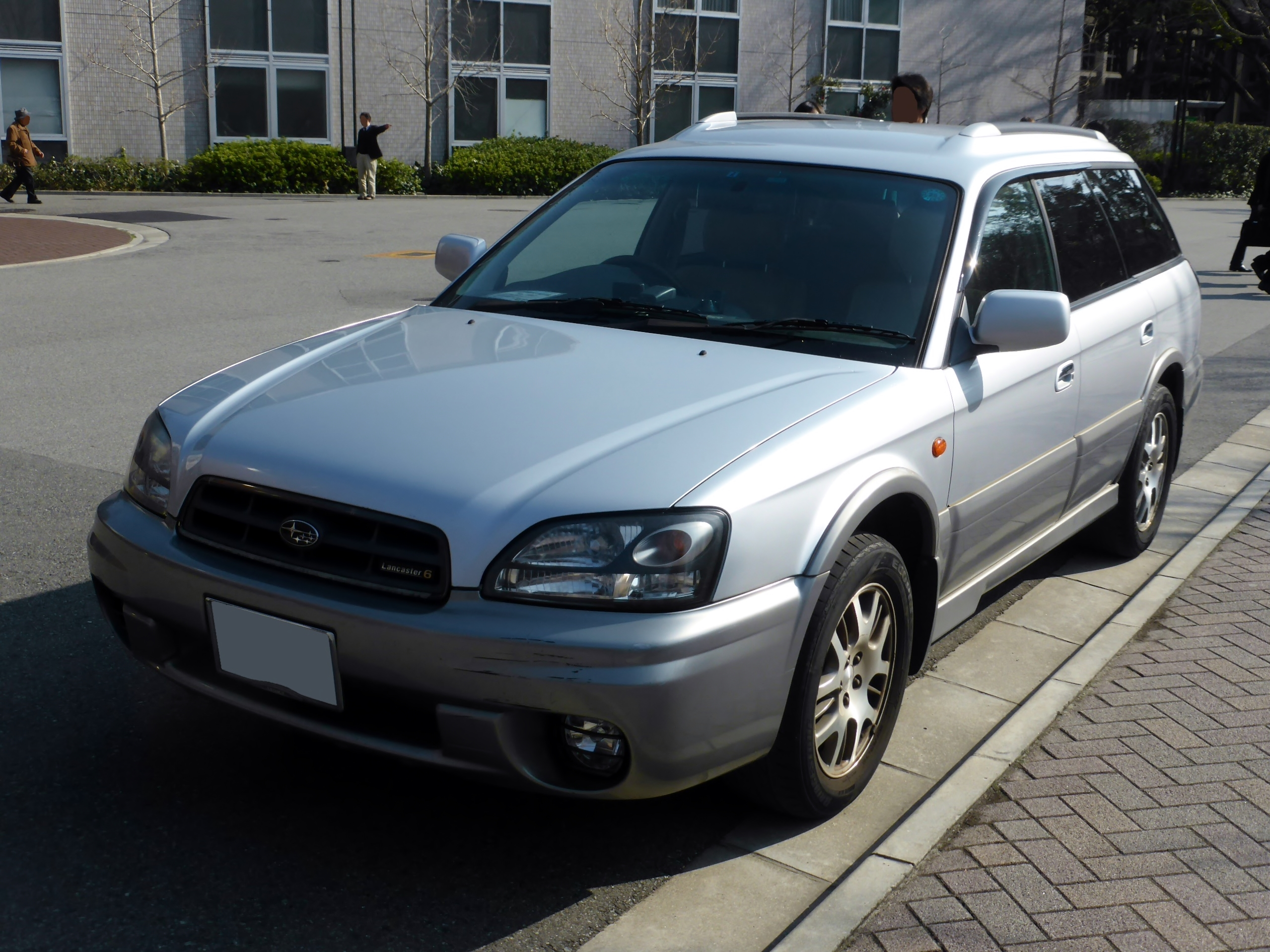
Lancaster 6 (D type) (Front)

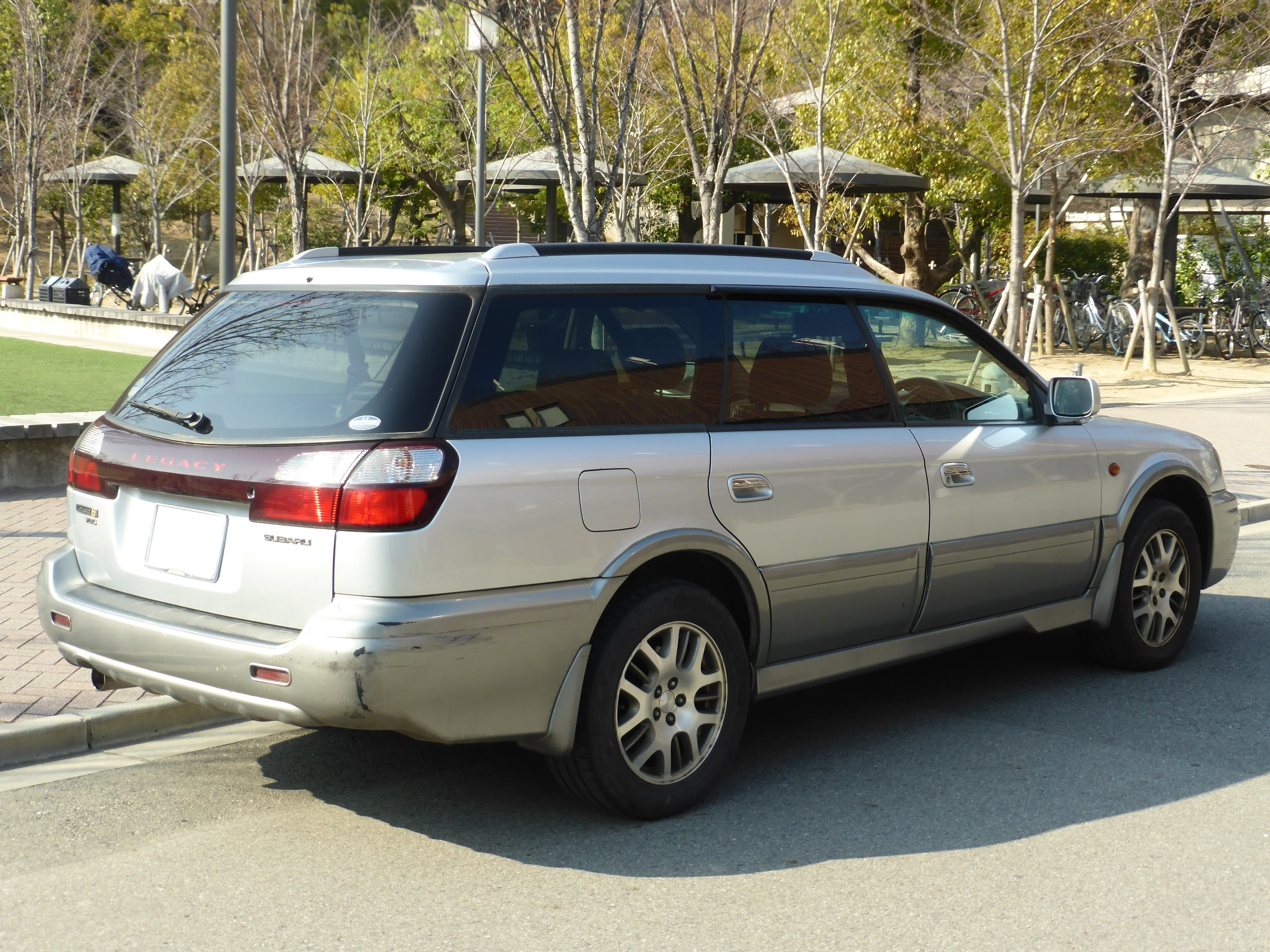
Lancaster 6 (D type) (Rear)

The Lancaster (as known in Japan) was released originally in September 1998 following the original release of the third-generation Legacy in May 1998. The Lancaster models were available originally in 2.5 L engine size with the E-4AT transmission or 5-Speed Manual Car. In May 2000, Subaru released the Lancaster 6, featuring Subaru's reborn Flat-6 engine. This was in production from April 2000 to May 2001 when Subaru released the facelifted Legacy models included a revised Lancaster design. These changes were seen on 'Outbacks' produced in Japan, US built Outbacks did not use the facelifted design released by Subaru Japan.

The Lancaster ADA (Active Driving Assist) was introduced in September 1999. The system featured two CCD cameras mounted either side of the rear-view mirror. The system was installed on 2.5 L models with VDC and then later in 2000 on the newer Lancaster 6 VDC models.

The ADA system featured four key safety components:

Function	Description
Lane Departure Warning	ADA will detect when the vehicle is diverging from the intended course of the road. An audible sound is made through the navigation system and dashboard warnings are illuminated.
Inter-vehicle Distance Warning	When the ADA detects the car fast approaching another vehicle in front, the system will warn the driver via an audible sound.
Dynamic Cruise Control	Whilst cruise control is active, ADA will keep the vehicle at a safe distance from the car in front. This in turn requires no input from the driver when the car is fast approaching a vehicle ahead.
Curve Alarm / Shift Down	If ADA detects an upcoming corner and calculates the car could face loss of traction or under/oversteer, ADA will warn the driver audibly and down-shift the transmission automatically to provide engine braking to the vehicle in order to slow it before entering the corner.

While Subaru's newly marketed ja:EyeSight (Japanese) system (essentially ADA) found in the 5th generation Legacy and Outback draws media attention for 'new advanced technology', the ADA system was actually a system developed back in the late 1990s along with the development of the 3rd Generation Legacy and is no means 'new technology' as such, but more a 'newly recognised' system for a more safety-conscious global market.

== Third generation (BL/BP; 2003) ==
Third generation
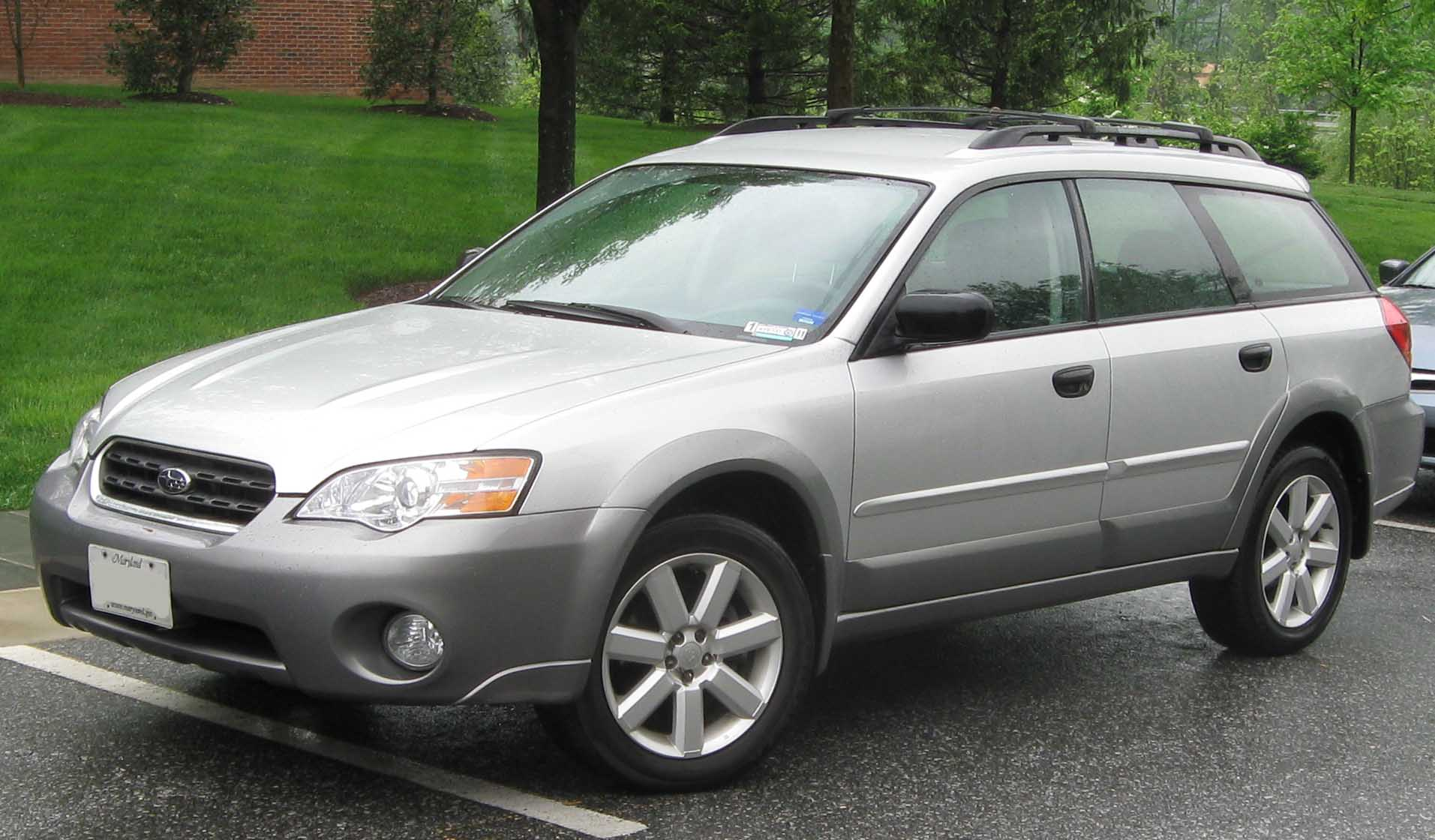

Overview
- Model code: BL (Sedan); BP (Station Wagon)
- Also called: Subaru Legacy Outback (Japan and Europe)
- Production: 2003–2009
- Model years: 2004–2009

Body and chassis
- Body style: 5-door station wagon 4-door sedan (United States; 2005−2007)

Powertrain
- Engine: 2.5L SOHC 175 hp (130 kW) H4; 2.5L DOHC 243 hp (181 kW) H4 turbo 3.0L DOHC 245 hp (183 kW) H6; 2.0L turbodiesel 148 hp (110 kW) H4 (Europe only)
- Transmission: 4-speed automatic 5-speed manual 5-speed automatic

Dimensions
- Wheelbase: 2,670 mm (105.1 in)
- Length: 4,793 mm (188.7 in) (2005–07 Station Wagon); 4,729 mm (186.2 in) (sedan); 4,801 mm (189 in) (2008–09 Station Wagon)
- Width: 1,770 mm (69.7 in)
- Height: 1,605 mm (63.2 in) (2005–07 Station Wagon); 1,501 mm (59.1 in) (sedan); 1,565 mm (61.6 in) (2008–09 base Station Wagon)

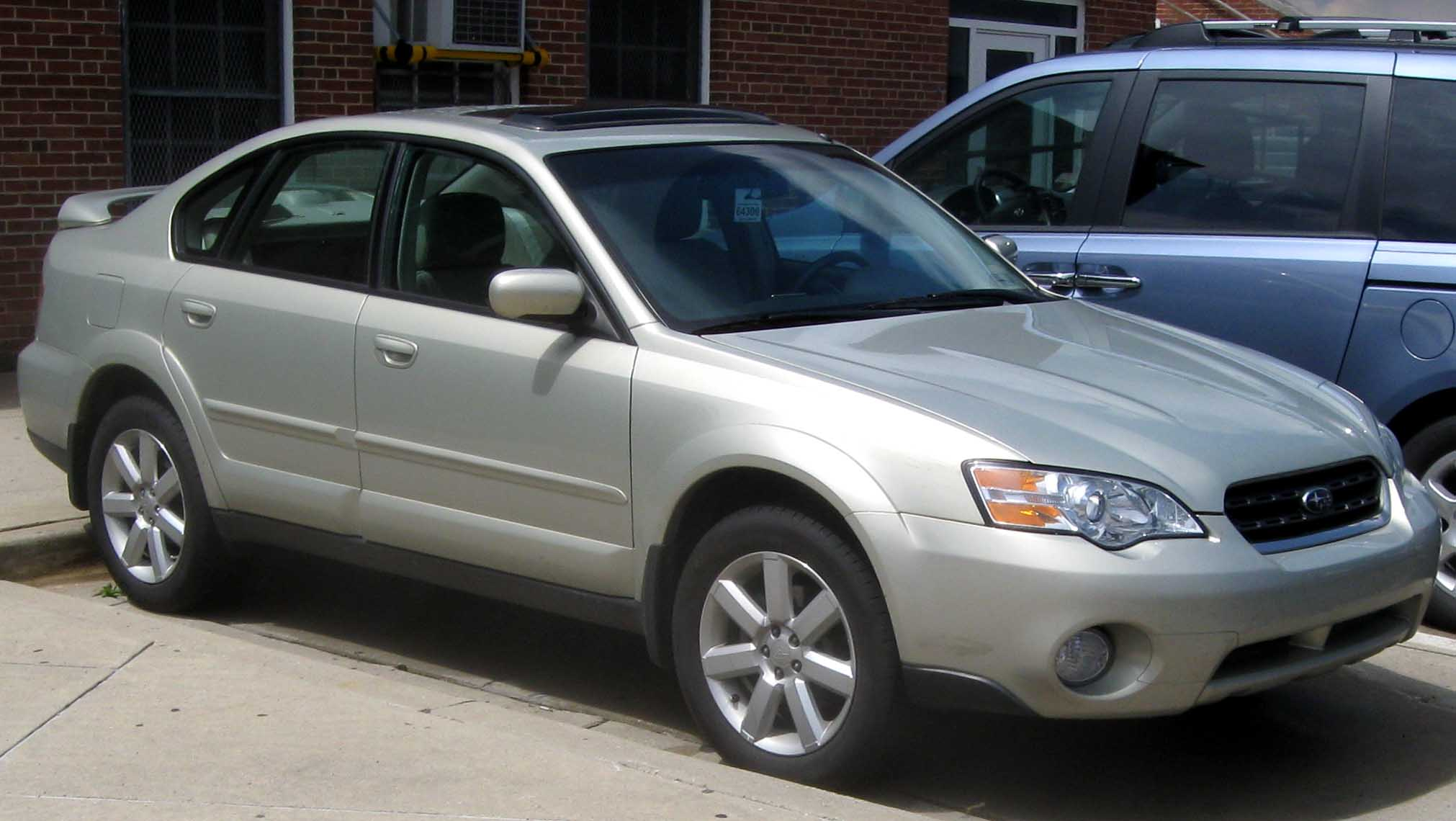
2005–2007 Subaru Outback Limited sedan

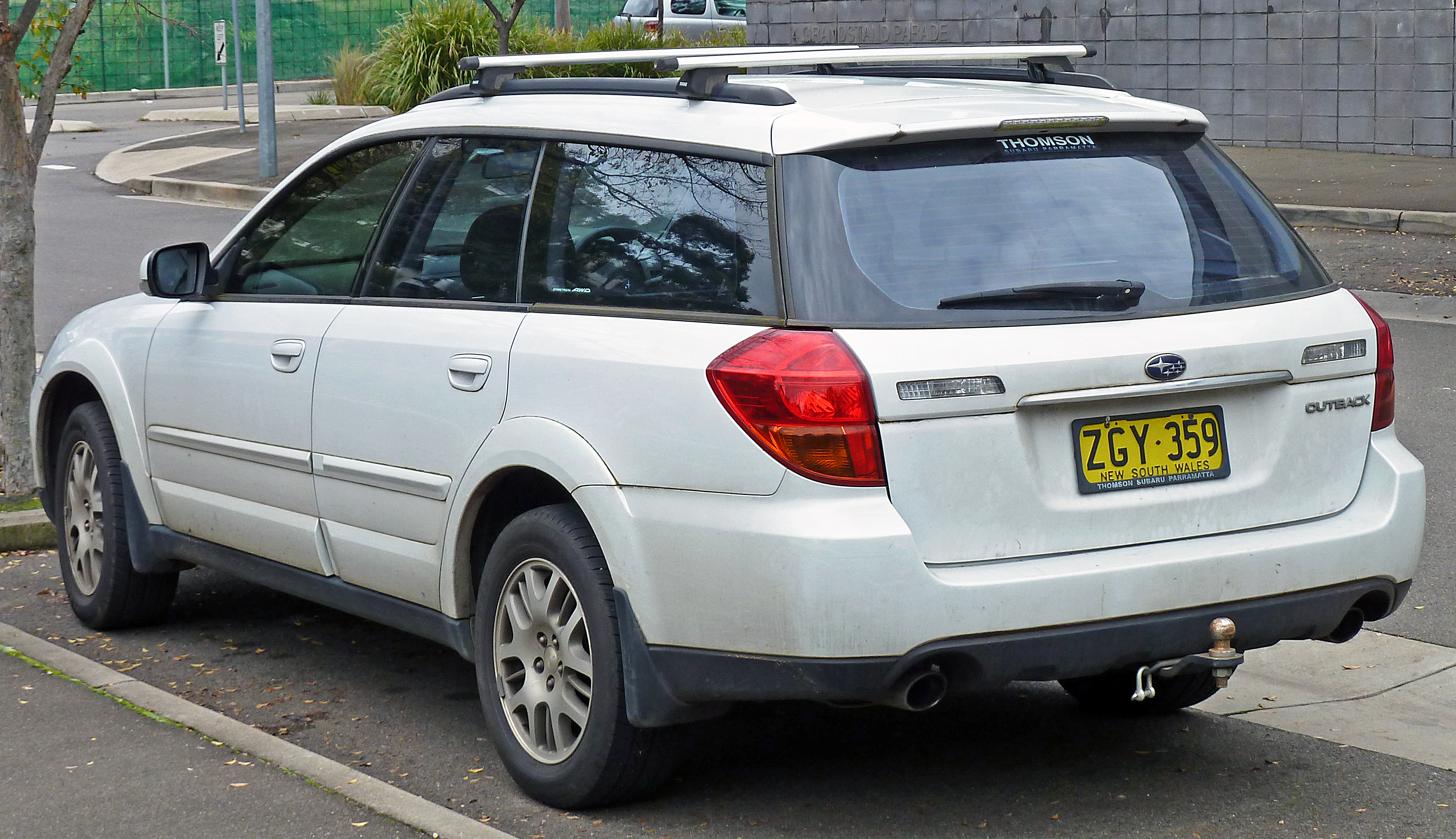
Pre-facelift Subaru Outback

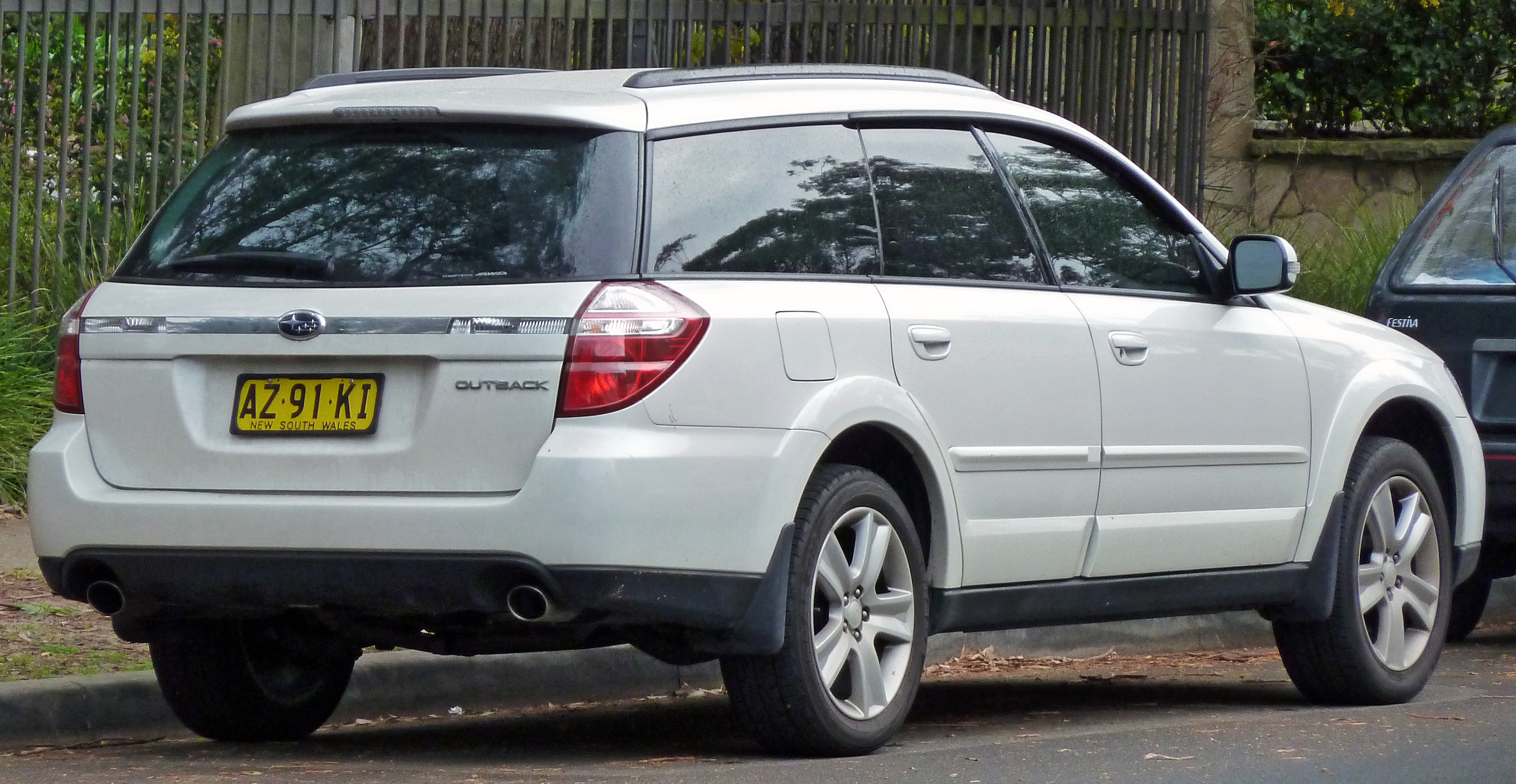
Facelift Subaru Outback

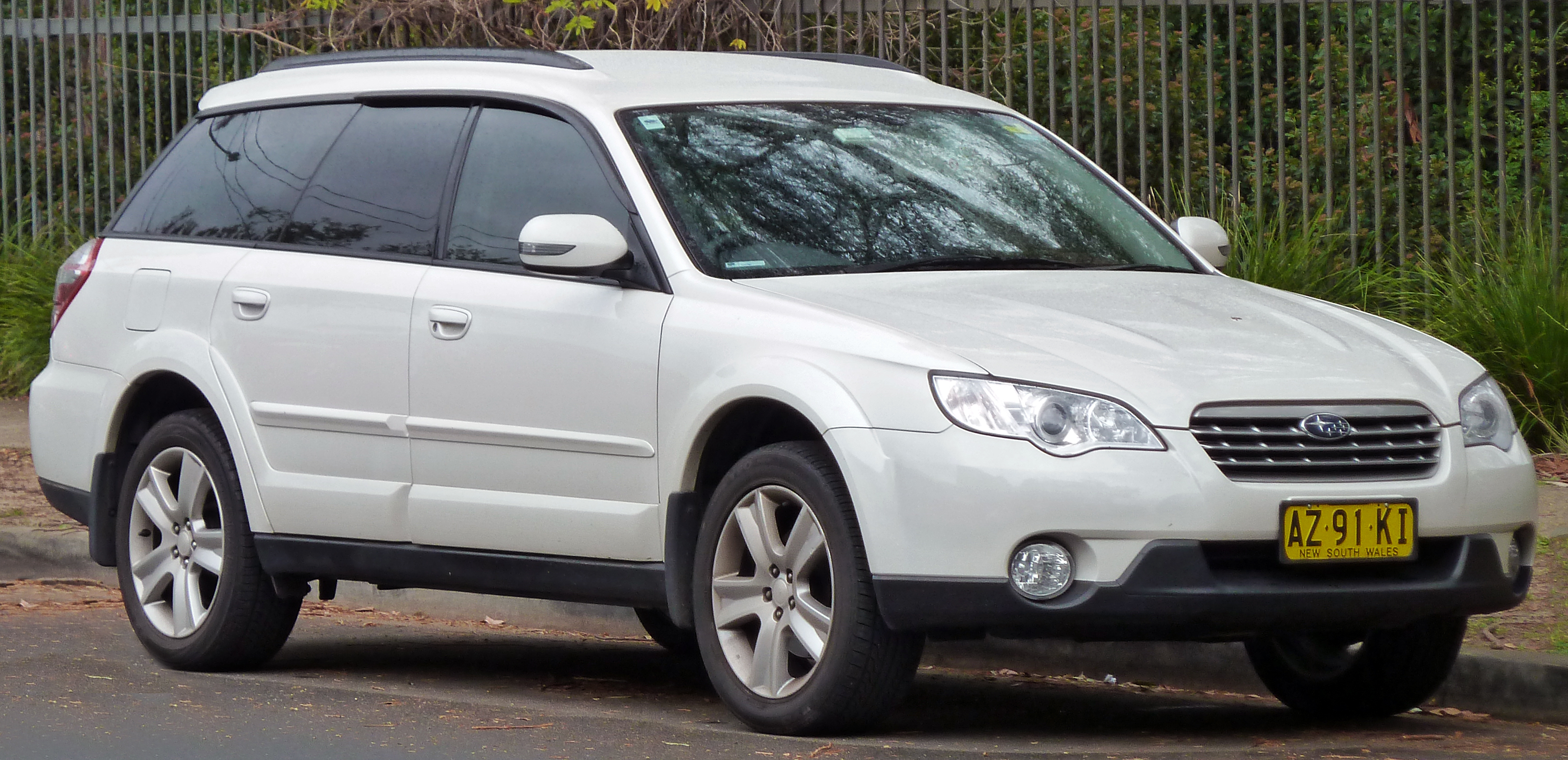
Facelift Subaru Outback

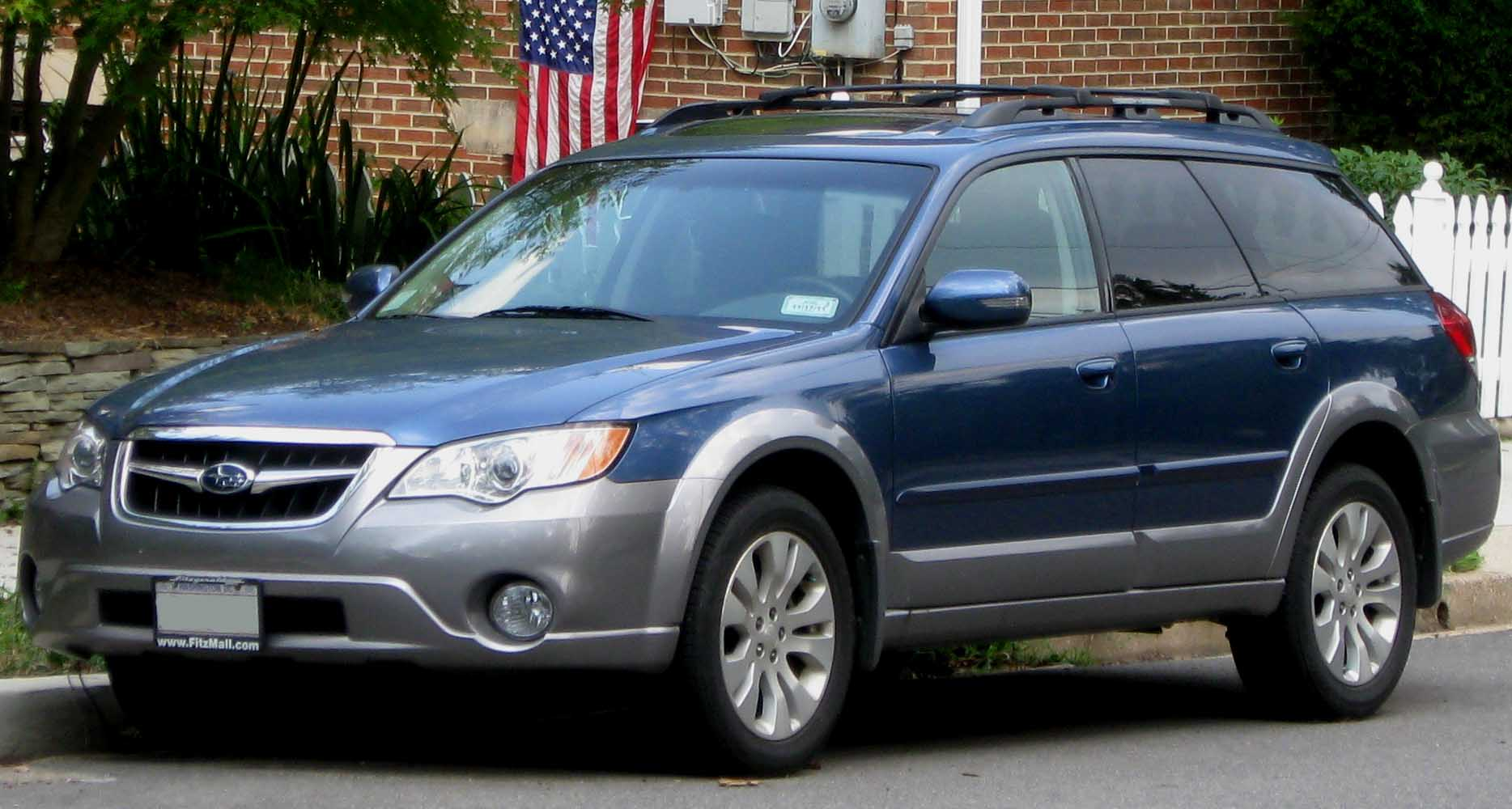
Facelift Subaru Outback

On October 22, 2003, with the debut of the third-generation Legacy at the 60th Frankfurt Auto Show, the Outback name was being used in all markets with the launch of the third-generation Outback crossover, which until that point had only been used in export markets. Models equipped with a 3.0L EZ30D H6 were introduced at the 2004 Chicago Auto Show. The ground clearance is 8.5 in (220 mm) in the US, so as to get around fuel economy regulations, and 7.8 in (200 mm) most elsewhere. In some countries, such as Canada, it varied by what engine was installed.

This generation of Outback carried the same model codes as the Legacy Wagon: BP9 for the 2.5-litre model and BPE for the 3.0-litre model. The highest trim level offered in the United States was the Outback "L.L. Bean Edition" that offered optional equipment as standard, including a wood and leather steering wheel, an auxiliary port on the stereo for external music player compatibility (2007 and later), perforated leather seats, GPS navigation, a double-sized, one-piece glass moonroof, limited-slip differential, and the 3.0-litre H6 engine. Starting with this generation, the interior retractable rear cargo cover had a separate stowage compartment in the spare tire storage area so that the cargo cover could be removed for large items and stowed out of the way inside the vehicle.

A new Outback variant for the 2005 and newer years was the Outback XT. This model came with the same turbocharged 2.5L EJ255 4-cylinder engine found in the Impreza WRX model. This engine produced 243 hp (181 kW), which was much higher than the naturally aspirated 2.5L engine, which produced 175 hp (130 kW). The XT model came equipped with any 2 of the 3 standard transmissions: a 5-speed Auto-SportShift, or a 5-speed manual.

In 2007, the Outback (along with the Ford Mondeo) won Top Gear's "Car of the Year" award.

As of the 2008 model year, the Legacy wagon and Outback sedan were discontinued in the United States, leaving only the Legacy sedan and Outback crossover models. The Outback crossover also received styling revisions for the 2008 model year, most notably an enlarged, chrome-ringed grille. Additionally in July 2008, Subaru ceased offering a special edition L.L. Bean trim level on the Outback.

For 2008, the 2.5i US-spec model was certified PZEV emissions and a "PZEV" badge attached to the rear of the vehicle on the bottom right hand side of the tailgate. All other models were certified LEV2. The PZEV Outback was available for sale in all 50 states, unlike other manufacturers, who usually only sell PZEV certified vehicles in states that have adopted California emission standards.

=== EyeSight ===
From May 2008 onwards, the Japanese-spec Legacy could be fitted with a new safety feature called EyeSight. It consists of two cameras, one on each side of the rear-view mirror, that use human-like stereoscopic vision to judge distances and generally keep tabs on the driver. The system helps maintain a safe distance on the highway, warns the driver during unintended lane departure, emits a wake up call should everyone else pull away from the traffic lights, and keeps an eye out for pedestrians. SI-Cruise has been integrated into the EyeSight feature as a driver safety aid.

=== Diesel ===
The Subaru EE series flat-4 diesel engine was offered in both Legacy and Outback models in Europe exclusively. These diesel models were introduced at the Geneva Motor Show in March 2008. Identified as the "Subaru Outback 2.0D", it was offered with a 5-speed manual transmission only. The top-of-the-line JDM and EU diesel models also had a "Start/Stop" button, similar to those found in Lexus, Infiniti, Audi and other high end makers.

According to the Subaru Owners on-line newsletter dated March 2008, Subaru was planning to introduce the diesel Legacy and Outback models in the U.S., stating they were "...currently making modifications to the diesel so it meets the more stringent U.S. standards. Subaru diesel models should be domestically available in two to three years." However, there has yet to be a diesel version of any Subaru model introduced into the U.S.

=== Safety ===
ANCAP test results* Subaru Outback variants with dual frontal airbags (2003)
Test	Score
Overall	5 /5 stars
Frontal offset	14.52/16
Side impact	15.05/16
Pole	Not Assessed
Seat belt reminders	3/3
Whiplash protection	Not Assessed
Pedestrian protection	Not Assessed
Electronic stability control	Optional

ANCAP test results* Subaru Outback variants with side curtain airbags (2003)
Test	Score
Overall	5 /5 stars
Frontal offset	14.52/16
Side impact	16/16
Pole	2/2
Seat belt reminders	3/3
Whiplash protection	Not Assessed
Pedestrian protection	Not Assessed
Electronic stability control	Optional

== Fourth generation (BR/BM; 2009) ==
Fourth generation
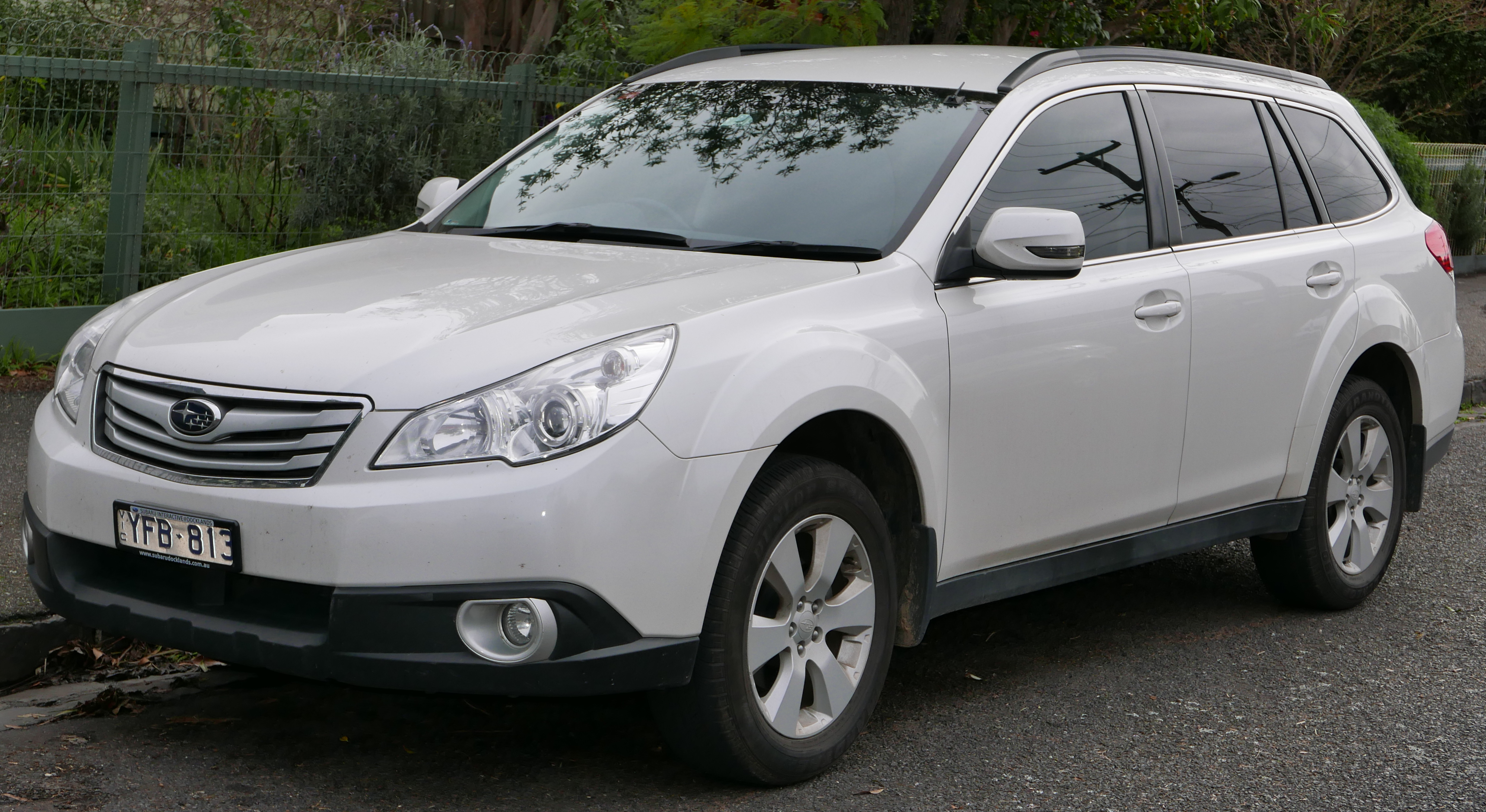

Overview
- Manufacturer: Subaru
- Model code: BR; BM
- Production: 2009–2014
- Model years: 2010–2014

Body and chassis
- Body style: 5-door station wagon
- Layout: AWD

Powertrain
- Engine: Gasoline: 2.5 L EJ253 SOHC i-AVLS H4 (2010–12); 2.5 L FB25B DOHC AVCS H4 (2013–14); 3.6 L EZ36 DOHC DAVCS H6; Diesel: 2.0 L DOHC EE20 turbo H4
- Transmission: Lineartronic CVT; 5-speed automatic 6-speed manual

Dimensions
- Wheelbase: 2,741 mm (107.9 in)
- Length: 2010–12: 4,780 mm (188.2 in); 2013–: 4,801 mm (189.0 in)
- Width: 1,821 mm (71.7 in)
- Height: 2010–12: 1,669 mm (65.7 in); 2013–: 1,623 mm (63.9 in)
- Curb weight: 1,659 kg (3,658 lb) (3.6R Limited)

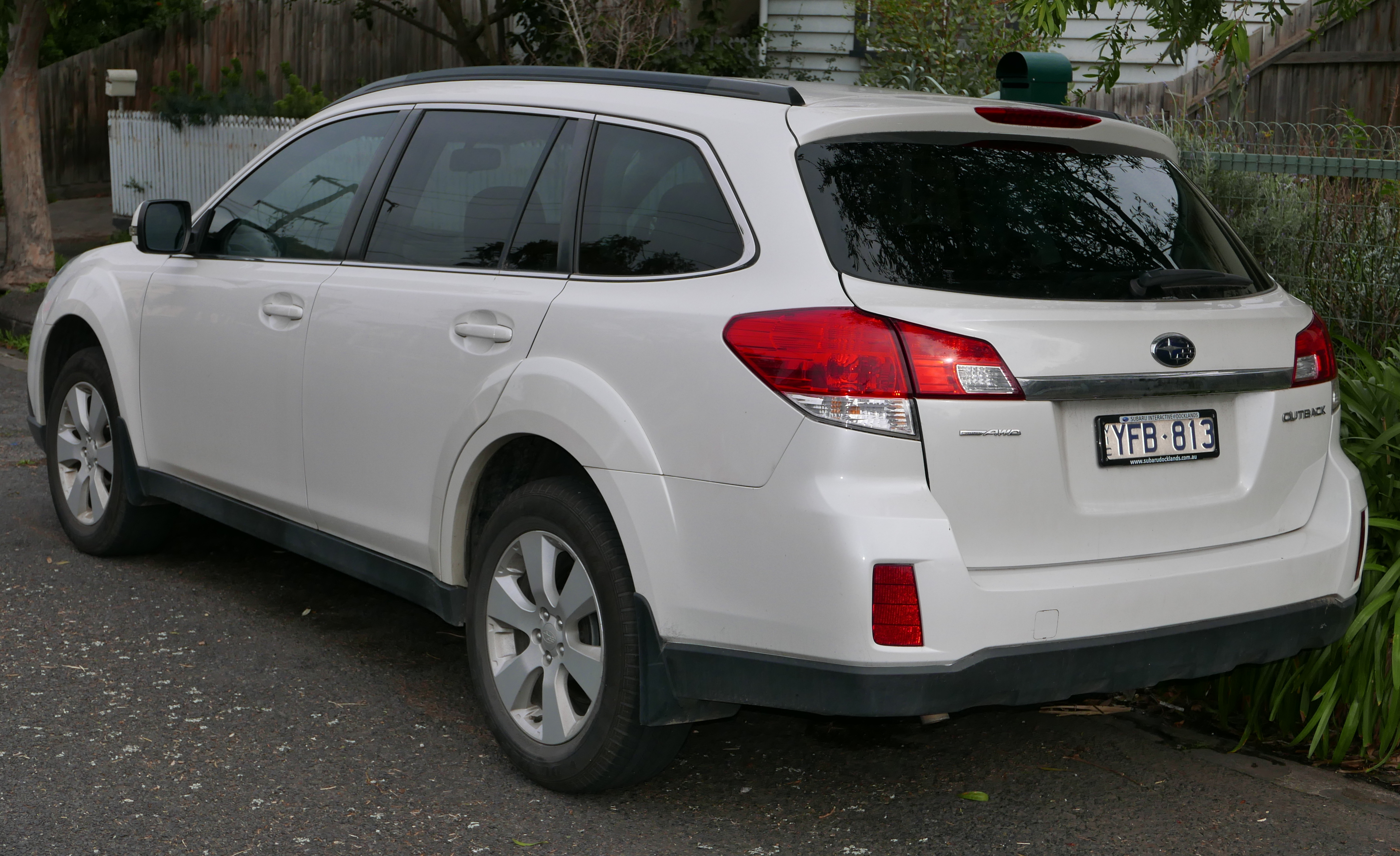
Subaru Outback 2.5i (Pre-facelift)

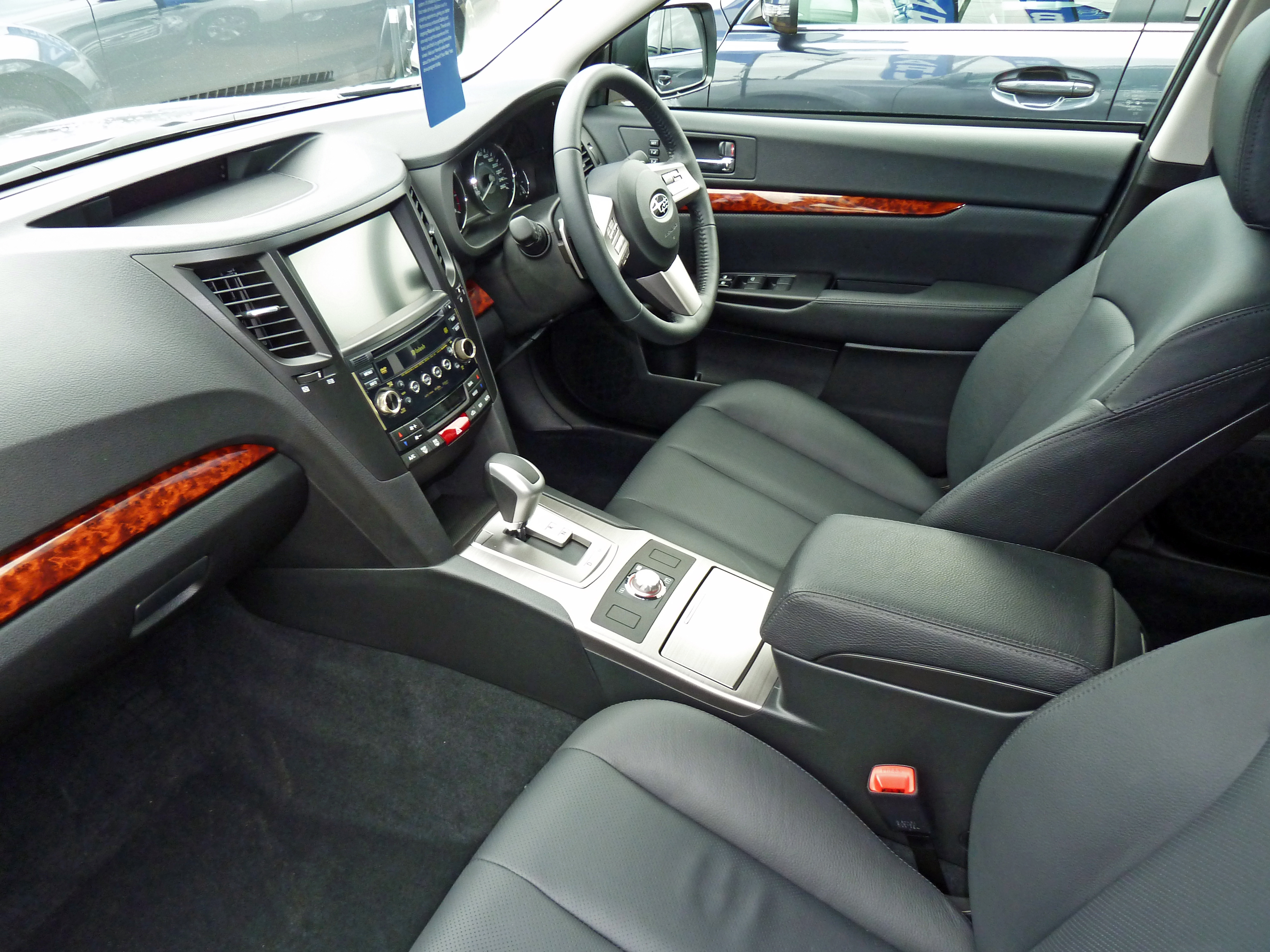
Interior

Based on the fifth generation Legacy, the fourth generation Subaru Outback was introduced in April 2009 at the New York Auto Show, the fifteenth anniversary of the first Outback's introduction at the same event. The Outback was introduced in Japan on May 20, 2009. The "Legacy" prefix has been dropped internationally. Air Bags are offered for the driver and front passenger, side bolster airbags for front seats on the outer edge, side curtain airbags for front and rear passengers and a knee bolster air bag for the driver.

The ground clearance increases to 8.7 in (220 mm), and is the ninth Subaru vehicle to feature continuously variable transmission (CVT). The double-sized moonroof is no longer being offered, and has been reduced to a conventional size that doesn't extend over the rear seats. The turbocharged engine is also no longer offered on all international versions of the Outback. An engine coolant temperature gauge is no longer offered, replaced by a fuel economy gauge instead. When the engine temperature is below normal, an indicator light shines blue and when the engine is overheating, the light turns red. Using the key to unlock the drivers' door after locking the vehicle with the remote will set off the security system; the vehicle must be unlocked with the remote, a tradition going back to the first generation when remote keyless access was introduced.

The side windows are no longer frameless, ending a Subaru tradition started with the first generation Leone in the early 1970s. The "D" pillar on the crossover is no longer covered in glass, also ending a design tradition established with the first generation and borrowed from the Subaru XT. The front and rear bumper covers are no longer painted a contrasting color, but the plastic side body cladding continues. The external "Limited" badge has been retired on North American vehicles, and if the vehicle has the 3.6 L six-cylinder engine, the rear of the vehicle has a "3.6R" badge applied internationally. Black housing for headlights is not offered on the Outback worldwide. The Outback with 2.0 L diesel engine can be distinguished by its hood scoop and "Boxer Diesel" emblem on the rear. On January 21, 2010, the Outback was introduced for sale in South Korea.

Subaru introduced improvements to the chassis that they call Dynamic Chassis Control Concept, which uses high-tensile steel in critical areas to achieve high strength with lighter weight. The front-end structure introduces Cradle Mount that isolates the suspension and engine from the passenger compartment for a smoother and quieter ride using rubber mounts. New for this generation is a double wishbone rear suspension, with all suspension links and the rear differential isolated from the rear subframe with large rubber mounts to minimize noise and vibration intruding into the passenger compartment. Subaru has also added safety technologies such as Electronic Stability Control, Brake Assist, and Electronic Brakeforce Distribution to the list of standard features.

In North America, the fourth generation Outback won Motor Trend's Sport/Utility of the Year Award for 2010, and Ward's Automotive Group's 2010 Interior of the Year awards in the popular-priced car category under $29,999.

=== North American models ===
Trim level designations have been modified based on the engine installed; the Subaru EJ engine 2.5 L naturally aspirated engine are labeled 2.5i, 2.5i Premium, and 2.5i Limited, with the Subaru EZ 6-cylinder engine identified as 3.6R, 3.6R Premium and 3.6R Limited. As with previous generations, leather interior is only available in two colors (Warm Ivory or Off-Black) on Limited trim packages on specific exterior colors, and a glass moonroof is optional only on the Limited; cloth interiors are offered in the specified colors on lower trim level packages. A 440 W, 9-speaker Harman/Kardon audio system, using Dolby Pro Logic II technology and DTS Digital Sound, with Bluetooth and iPod capability is optional on the Limited trim packages. An 8 in (203 mm) voice activated GPS touch screen navigation system is optional only on the Limited. A separate Bluetooth wireless package with voice recognition, called Blueconnect, is available on lower trim levels and is not offered internationally. A Harman/Kardon-sourced stereo with a 6-disc in-dash CD changer and SRS Circle Surround sound is the standard sound system provided, with four speakers on all trim levels. A dual zone digital climate control system with 6-speed fan is standard and only available on the Limited; the base and Premium model have a 4-speed fan. Base and Premium trim levels have silver metallic trim on the interior door panels and dashboard; the Limited trim package has woodgrain accents.

All trim levels are fitted with a retractable roof installed luggage rack. Also, the North American Outback has lower side body claddings. The grille appearance is unique on North American models so as to provide a visual similarity to the larger facelifted Tribeca and the third generation Forester. The 2.5i uses the flat-4 engine with 6-speed manual transmission or the optional Lineartronic Continuously variable transmission with steering column-mounted paddle shifters that allows the driver to select 6 "virtual gears" in manual mode. The 3.6R uses the flat-6 engine (from the Subaru Tribeca) exclusively with a 5-speed automatic transmission. The conventional automatic transmission is only available with the flat-6 engine, and the 6-speed manual transmission is not available on the 2.5i Limited. The PZEV Outback 2.5i, identified by a badge attached to the rear of the vehicle, continues to be sold in all 50 states, unlike other manufacturers who only sell PZEV certified vehicles in states that have adopted California emission standards. All other models have been certified LEV2 or ULEV.

For the 2013 model year, Subaru refreshed the Outback, and it debuted at the 2012 New York Auto Show.

=== Japanese models ===
The Japanese-specification Outback is available with either the 2.5 L flat-4 or the 3.6 L flat-6 engine. The EJ20 engine is no longer used in the Legacy or the Legacy Outback. The trim levels are 2.5i, 2.5i L package and 3.6R and 3.6R SI-Cruise. SI-Cruise is an autonomous cruise control system that can reduce or resume a preset speed or bring the vehicle to a complete stop if the system detects a slower vehicle is being followed, without driver intervention. Air vents are installed for rear passengers at the back of the center front armrest compartment. The front hood (bonnet) and front bumper covers are not interchangeable with the North American version due to slight changes in the sheet metal. Turn signal repeaters are still integrated into the side exterior mirrors on all Japanese-spec models. Woodgrain accents are standard on the "L" package and the SI-Cruise vehicle, silver accents on lower trim levels.

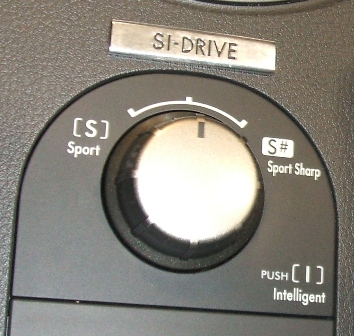
SI-Drive control knob (earlier version)

SI-Drive, or Subaru Intelligent-Drive, (Japanese: SI-Drive) is standard equipment on all trim versions. It is a feature that enables three distinctly different modes of vehicle performance characteristics (identified as "Sport", "Sport Sharp", and "Intelligent") by regulating the engine control unit (ECU), the automatic transmission control unit (TCU, if equipped), and by fine-tuning the electronically controlled throttle. The SI-Drive control knob is installed on the center console between the heated front seat control switches. The "Intelligent" mode makes throttle response more gradual, and decreases maximum engine power by 10 percent. The "Sport" mode allows the engine to run at higher speeds and increases fuel efficiency by 5 percent in comparison to Subaru engines without the feature. The "Sport # (Sharp)" mode makes throttle response more abrupt and enables the automatic transmission to maintain higher RPMs within a given gear's range, and minimizes the electric power steering wheel effort. When the engine is started, the default setting is the "Sport" selection.

Japanese buyers can choose two different premium level entertainment systems; they can select the previously described Harman/Kardon GPS-stereo with six speakers, or a McIntosh sourced GPS/stereo with Dolby Digital 5.1 Surround Sound, a separate powered amplifier and 10 speakers. Both units are Gracenote, G-BOOK and VICS enabled, with both systems available with an internal 600 MHz 40GB HDD coupled with a digital TV tuner that can be watched when the transmission is in park and the parking brake applied. Both stereos are compatible with CD, CD-R/RW, DVD and DVD R/RW as well as MP3 and WMA music formats. A Harman/Kardon sourced stereo with a 6-disc in-dash CD changer and SRS Circle Surround sound is the entry level sound system offered with six speakers and is standard equipment. The McIntosh stereo facia is offered in the trademark black with a clear plastic overlay and the center dashboard trim piece retains the brushed aluminum appearance but the color is black, with the climate controls offered in a matching black appearance, instead of the standard silver. Oddly, the Japanese version has a retractable cover for the console installed cupholders, whereas the North American version has exposed cupholders without a retractable cover. The dual-zone climate control system is standard on all trim levels.

The GPS navigation system can be displayed in a split-screen format showing both two- and three dimensions with graphic landmarks instead of a flat screen without geographical images. HID headlights are standard on all models except the base 2.5i, as well as automatic rain sensing windshield wipers and headlight washers. A smart key is available as an option coupled with two position memory seat that memorizes driver's seat positions and adjustments, exterior mirror adjustment, and climate control settings. The settings can be customized based on the smart key module being used to unlock and start the car. The Outback can be fitted with twin white LED lights installed on the interior hatch vertically surrounding the rear window, with a separate light switch for additional illumination when the rear hatch is open.

On the first anniversary of the introduction of the fourth generation, "EyeSight" was once again offered on the Japanese-spec Outback. EyeSight consists of 2 cameras with one on each side of the interior rear-view mirror, that use human-like stereoscopic vision to judge distances and generally keep tabs on the driver. The system can help maintain a safe distance on the highway, a lane departure warning system, a wake up call when traffic lights change, and even keeps an eye out for pedestrians. SI-Cruise has been integrated into the EyeSight feature as a driver safety aid.

=== European models ===
The European engine choices are the flat-4 EE20 2.0 L turbodiesel, the EJ25 2.5 L or the EZ36 3.6 L flat-6, with SI-Drive available only on the six-cylinder. Trim level packages are the 2.0D Comfort, Trend and Active, the 2.5i Comfort and Trend, or the 3.6R Exclusive. The interior colors of Warm Ivory or Off Black are offered, but the Warm Ivory interior is only available in leather. Wood accents are only available on the Exclusive trim package. The dual-zone climate control system is standard on all trim levels. The turbodiesel is available with the Warm Ivory interior with the Harman/Kardon sound system with six speakers and the satellite navigation, but the only transmission offered is the six-speed manual transmission. Cruise control, heated seats, automatic windshield wipers, HID headlights with headlight washers, heated exterior mirrors, glass moonroof and 17" wheels are standard equipment. The smart key is available only on the Exclusive or Comfort trim packages, coupled with the satellite navigation system and memory seats. The front hood (bonnet) and front bumper covers use the Japanese configuration, with turnsignal repeaters on the exterior mirrors, and standard equipment front and rear foglights. The turbodiesel and the 2.5i engines are Euro5 compliant.

2013 brings a facelift of the model with minor updates on the exterior and interior. Steering and handling is improved, and CVT is offered with the diesel engine. A new multimedia navigation unit is offered.

=== United Kingdom models ===
The Outback is available to United Kingdom buyers with a choice of the flat-4 Subaru EE turbodiesel with a 6-speed manual transmission, the 2.5 L flat-4 with the CVT transmission, or the 3.6 L flat-6 engine with SI-Drive and a 5-speed automatic transmission. The trim level packages are the 2.0D SE and 2.0D SE NavPlus diesel, the 2.5i SE and the 2.5i SE NavPlus and the 3.6R. The interior is offered in black only, with leather on all trim levels. The interior trim strips on the doors and dashboard are silver on all models except the 3.6R, which has woodgrain trim. The front bumper and bonnet use the Japanese configuration, to include self-levelling HID headlights and headlight washers. The UK and Europe are offered an exterior paint selection, called Camellia Red Pearl that is not available in Japan or North America. For vehicle security, a Thatcham Category 1 perimeter alarm and immobiliser, along with a rolling code ECU engine immobiliser are standard equipment. The dual-zone climate control system is standard on all trim levels. The 2.5i and the turbodiesel engines are Euro5 compliant.

The smart key is available on NavPlus and 3.6R models only. 17" alloy wheels are standard on all models, as well as rain sensing automatic wipers, two position memory seat, heated exterior mirrors, glass moonroof, heated front seats, fog lights, and tilt and telescoping steering wheel. The Harman/Kardon stereo with 6 speakers and the rear-view backup camera is installed only on vehicles with the voice recognition NavPlus system. The standard stereo system uses an in-dash 6-disc CD auto-changer and automatic speed-sensing volume adjustment that is MP3 player compatible.

=== South African models ===
The Outback is offered with black interior; specifications are similar to European "Comfort" trim package. Outback 2.5i Premium is available with the choice of Lineartronic CVT or six-speed manual transmission, including leather trim, memory function for the driver's seat, electric sunroof, dual zone climate control and rear air vents. Satellite navigation is not offered along with the premium Harman/Kardon sound system.

Recently, the 2.0 diesel (6-speed manual only) and 3.6R models have been introduced.

=== Australian models ===
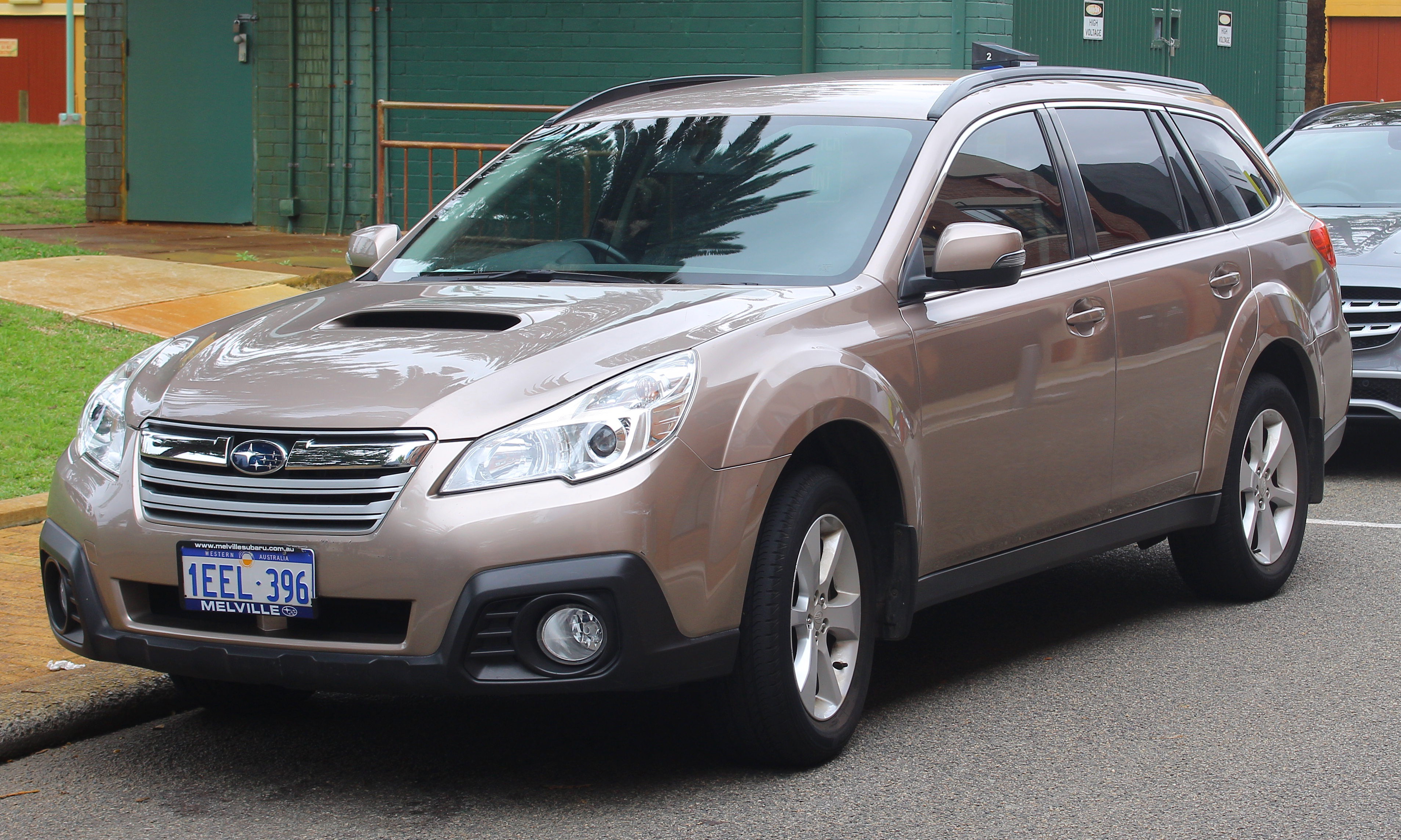
Subaru Outback 2.0D (Facelift)

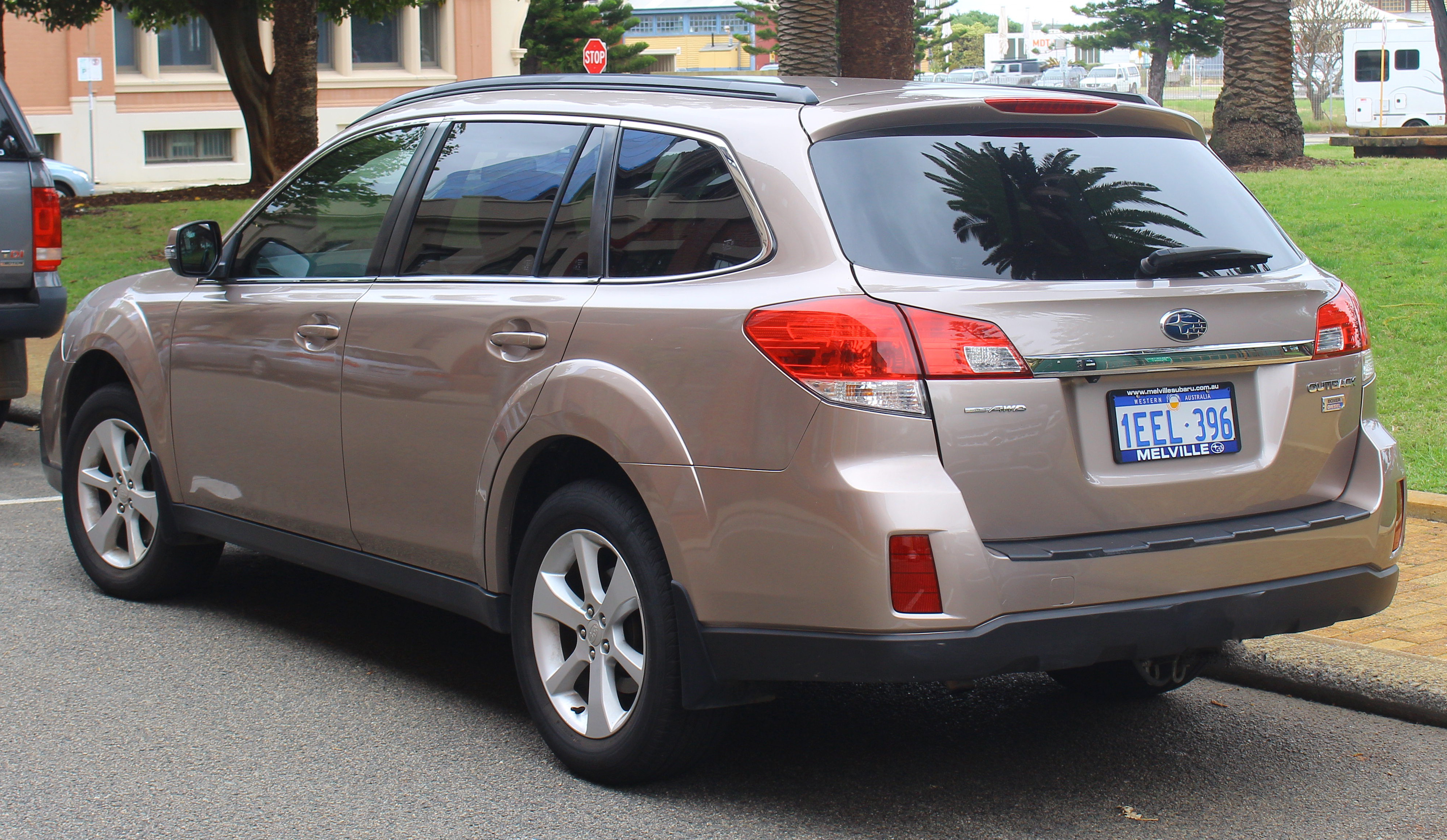
Subaru Outback 2.0D (Facelift)

The Outback sold in Australia resembles the vehicle sold in Europe, with some features only available in Japan. The trim level packages are the 2.5i, 2.5i Premium, 2.5i Premium SatNav, the 3.6R, 3.6R Premium SatNav and the diesel 2.0D, 2.0D Premium, 2.0D Premium SatNav. The engines offered are the EJ25, EZ36 and the EE20 turbodiesel. Australians can choose either the Lineartronic CVT or a 6-speed manual transmission on the EJ25, but transmission choices on the EZ36 are limited to the 5-speed automatic, and the EE20 turbodiesel is available with the 6-speed manual transmission exclusively. The Off Black interior color is standard across the range, however the Warm Ivory is available on the 3.6R, with leather interior offered on vehicles identified as "Premium". Cloth is offered on the 2.5i, 3.6R and the 2.0D. SI-Drive is only available on the 3.6R, following the international trend. The front bumper and hood (bonnet) use the Japanese configuration. The Australian EJ25 and EE20 engines are Euro4 compliant.

The dual-zone climate control system is standard on all trim levels. Sound systems offered include the McIntosh stereo with 10 speakers, a separate powered amplifier and satellite navigation provided by "WhereIs", a service provided by Telstra Corporation Ltd, or the Harman/Kardon stereo with the satellite navigation and 6 speakers, or the unit offered in North America and Europe with a 6-disc in-dash CD changer and 6 speakers. The McIntosh unit sold in Australia has function buttons written in English and is different from the Japanese unit, due to Japanese characters being used on some of the functions. The Australian McIntosh or Harman/Kardon GPS-stereo packages are not Gracenote, G-BOOK and VICS enabled, and do not have the internal 600 MHz 40GB HDD coupled with a digital TV tuner. The center dashboard trim is color matched based on the stereo installed; if it has either one of the Harman/Kardon units, the trim color is silver brushed aluminum, and if the McIntosh is installed the trim color is black brushed aluminum. The climate controls are also colored either silver or black as well. Silver trim is installed on the doors and dashboard, with woodgrain available only on the 3.6R. Cruise control, heated seats, automatic windshield wipers, HID headlights with headlight washers, heated exterior mirrors, and 17" wheels are standard equipment. The smart key is available only on the 3.6R, and the glass moonroof is only offered on Premium trim packages.

=== Safety ===
ANCAP test results* Subaru Outback (2010)
Test	Score
Overall	5 /5 stars
Frontal offset	13.80/16
Side impact	16/16
Pole	2/2
Seat belt reminders	3/3
Whiplash protection	Not Assessed
Pedestrian protection	Adequate
Electronic stability control	Standard

== Fifth generation (BS; 2014) ==
Fifth generation
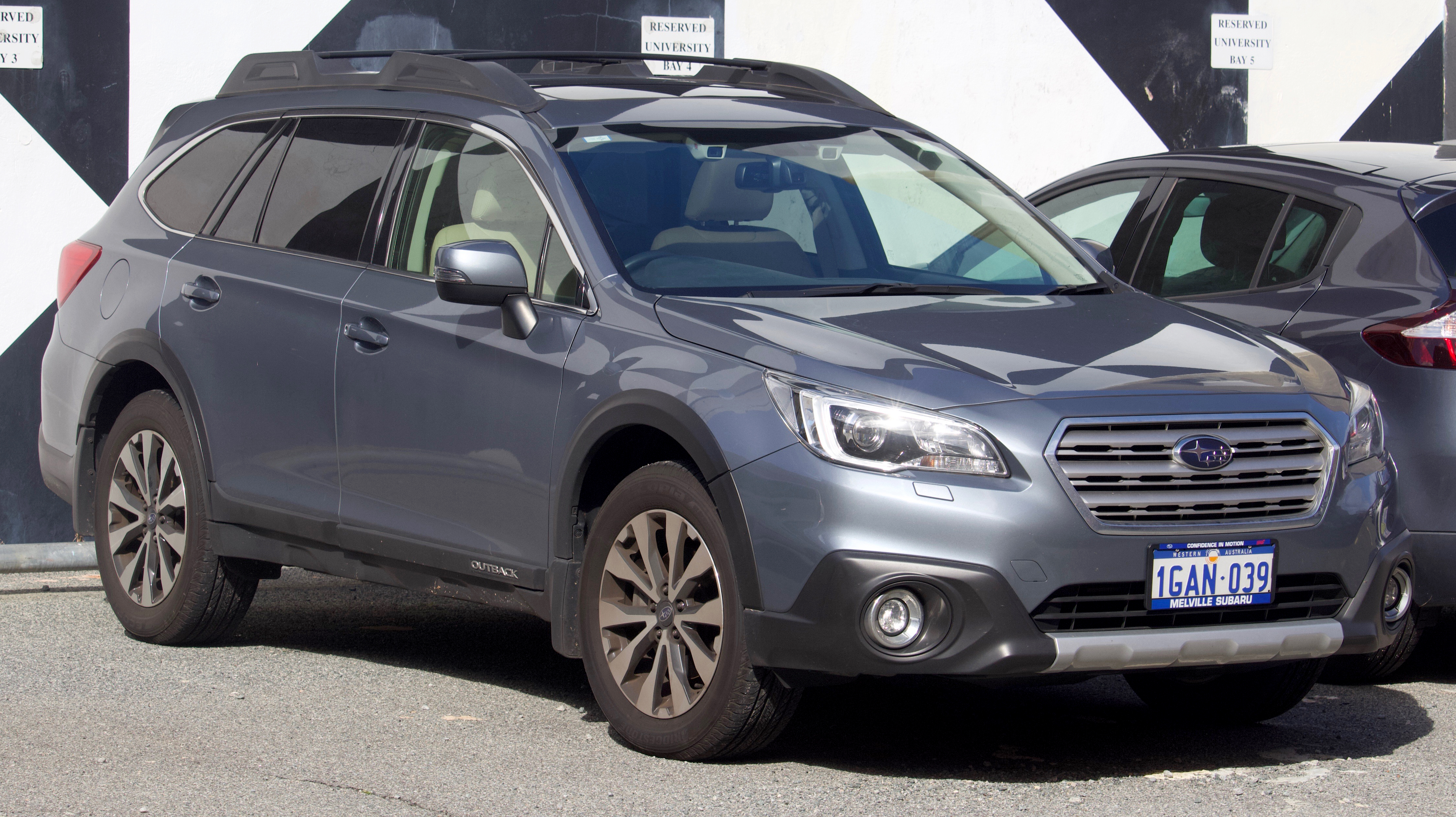

Overview
- Model code: BS
- Production: 2014–2019
- Model years: 2015–2019

Body and chassis
- Body style: 5-door station wagon
- Layout: F4 layout
- Related: Subaru Legacy (sixth generation); Subaru Legacy; Subaru Tribeca; Subaru Exiga

Powertrain
- Engine: Gasoline: 2.5 L SOHC i-AVLS 170 hp (130 kW) H4 (EJ253); 2.5 L DOHC DAVCS 170 hp (130 kW) H4 FB25; 3.6 L DOHC DAVCS 256 hp (191 kW) H6 (EZ36D); Diesel: 2.0 L DOHC turbodiesel 148 hp (110 kW) H4 (EE20)
- Transmission: Lineartronic CVT; 6-speed manual

Dimensions
- Wheelbase: 2,746 mm (108.1 in)
- Length: 4,816 mm (189.6 in)
- Width: 1,839 mm (72.4 in) (w/mirrors)
- Height: 1,679 mm (66.1 in)
- Curb weight: 1,630 kg (3,593 lb)

Chronology
- Successor: Subaru Outback (sixth generation)

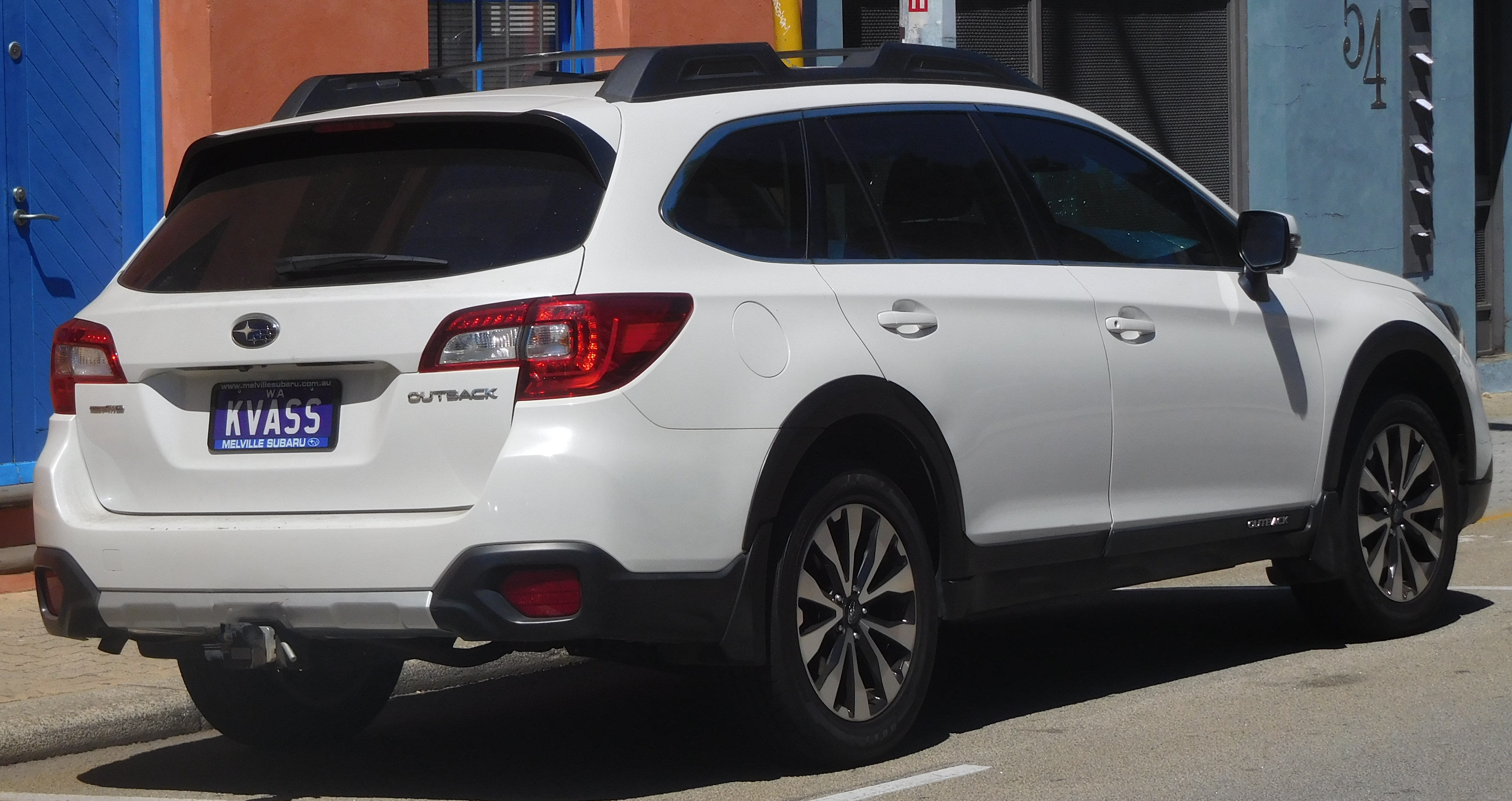
Subaru Outback 2.5i Premium (2018 facelift)

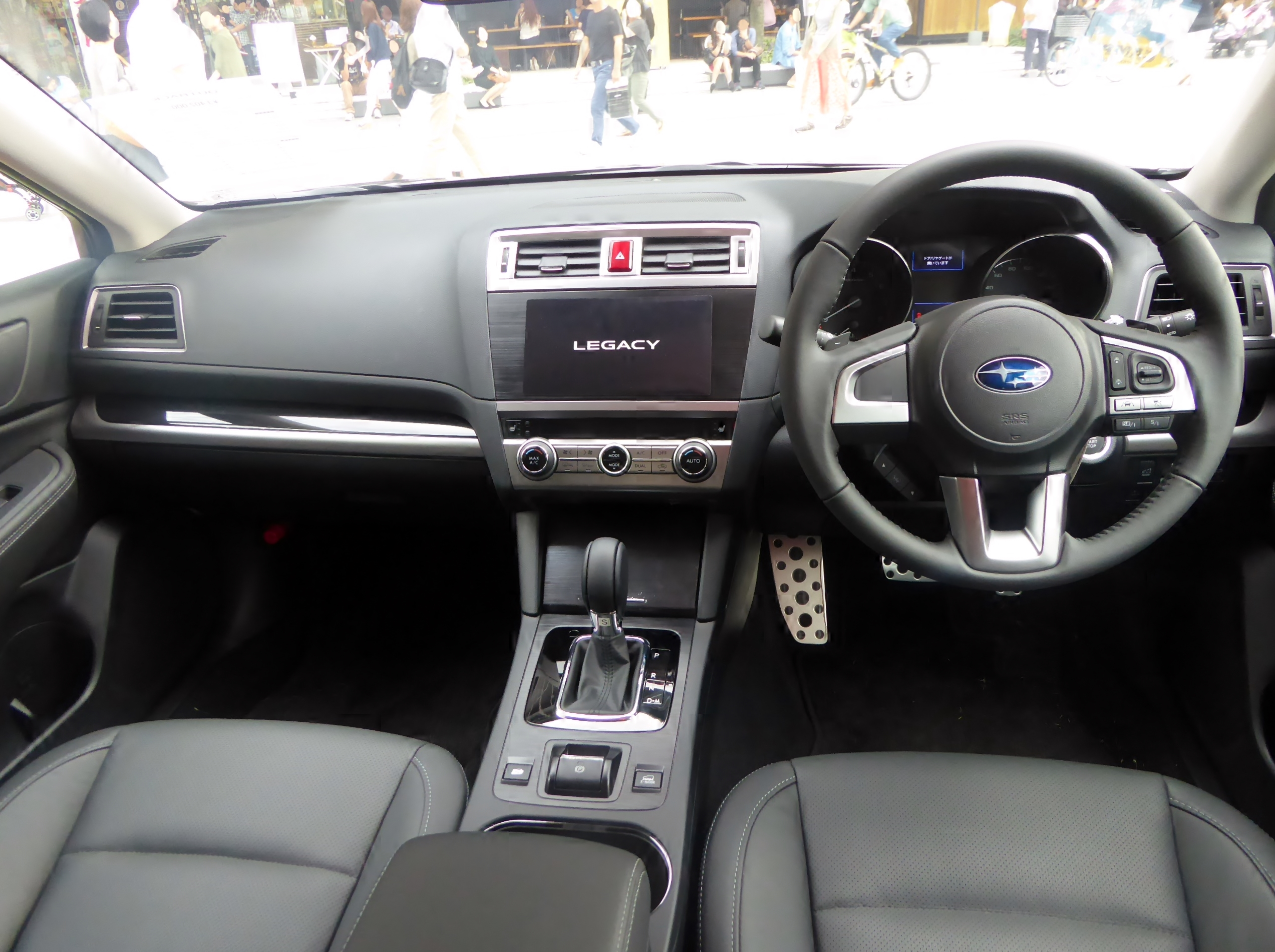
Interior

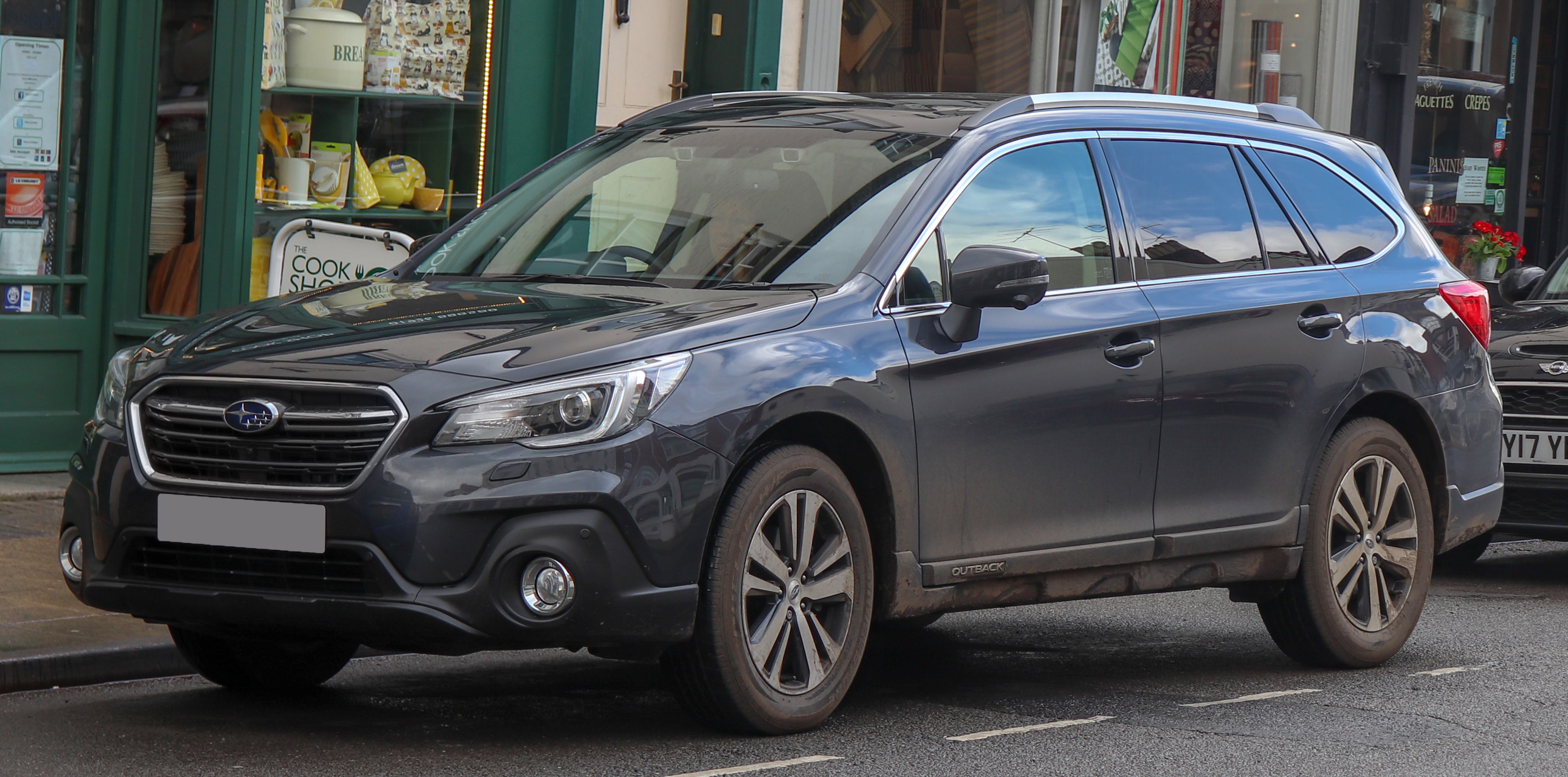
Facelift Subaru Outback

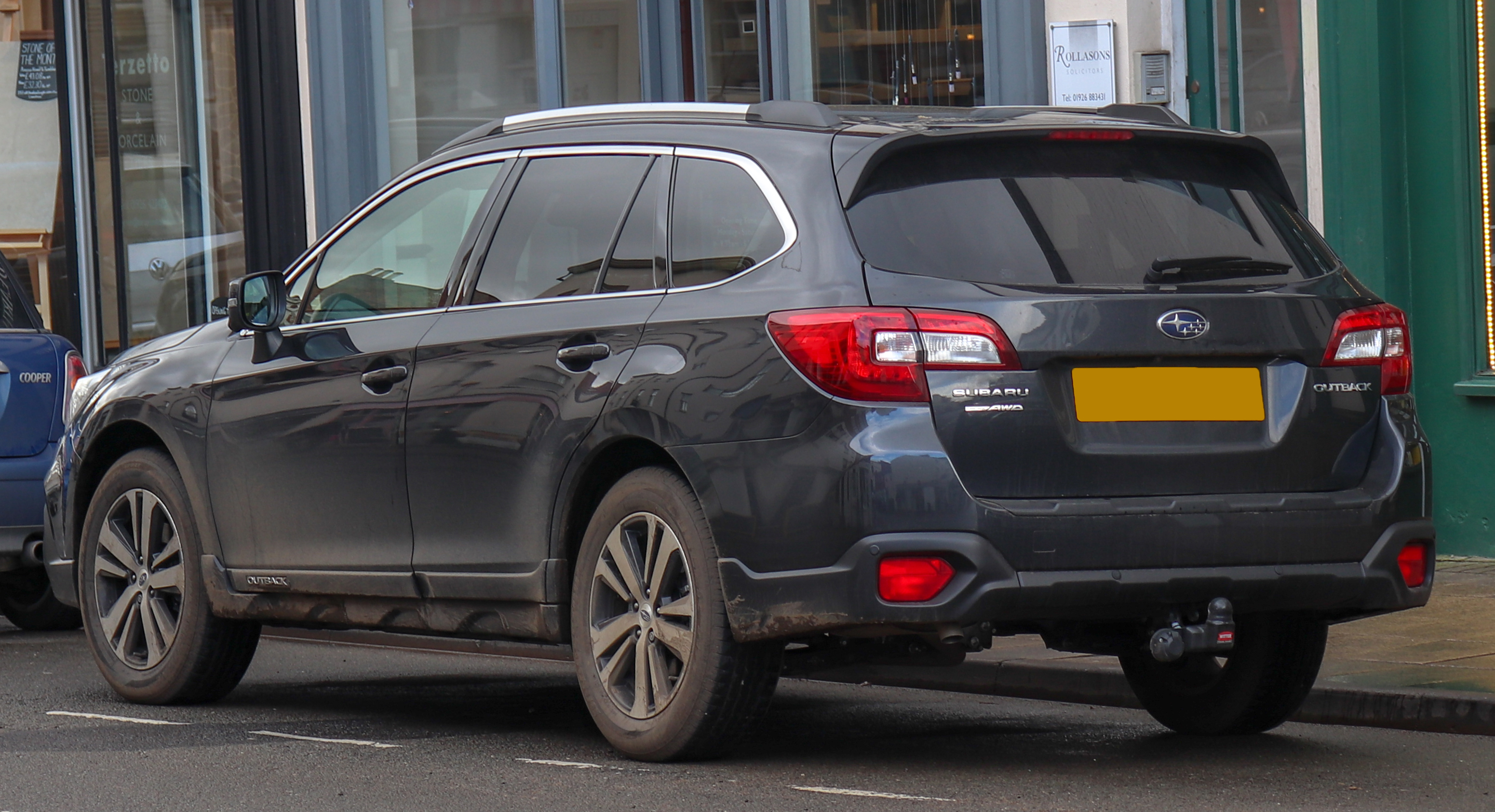
Facelift Subaru Outback

The fifth-generation Outback released in 2014 for the 2015 year model with the sixth generation Legacy, still badged the Legacy Outback for Japan. The sixth-generation Legacy was previewed as a concept at the Los Angeles Auto Show in November 2013; the Legacy sedan was premiered at Chicago in February 2014, with the Outback following at New York Auto Show in April 2014. An unrelated Legacy-based "sports tourer" wagon, the Subaru Levorg, was shown in 2013 and first sold in 2014. Elsewhere, the Outback became a free-standing model line of its own, independent of the Legacy, thus bringing greater product differentiation between the two.

Subaru billed the exterior styling evolution as being shaped by the concept of 'more Outback', claiming to combine the strengths of passenger cars and sport-utility vehicles and capitalizing on the brand recognition gained from selling the Outback since 1995. EyeSight was offered for the first time in the European market on the new Outback. Chassis stiffness was improved for the fifth-generation Outback. To reduce aerodynamic drag, the side view mirrors were mounted on the sheet metal of the front doors rather than the base of the A-pillar, as was the case with previous models.

From 2018, some world markets also offered Subaru Adaptive Driving Beam (ADB) that allow a driver to leave their high beam switched on at all times, and in combination with EyeSight, adjust a series of shutters that cover portions of the high beam light projection to prevent dazzling oncoming drivers whilst maintaining visibility of the rest of the road, or to "draw a box" of low beam around a lead vehicle that adjusts left and right working with SRH in line with that vehicle's movement. Other additions include front and side cameras along with Apple CarPlay and Android Auto, and the ability to change the color of the combination meter illuminated rings to one of eleven different colors.

The fifth-generation Subaru Outback started to be classified as a 'crossover', with the body and wheelbase set larger than previous models. Other technical changes such as the larger 256 hp (191 kW) 3.6L EZ36 engine have pushed it into this classification. The Outback received a Top Safety Pick award from the IIHS, an ASV+ rating from JNCAP, and five stars from NHTSA.

The fifth-generation Outback retained the same 2.5-litre FB25 and 3.6-litre EZ36 engines from the 2013 refresh; the FB25 was slightly revised to improve mid-range torque. In China, the uplevel engine was a turbocharged 2.0-litre FA20F instead of the EZ36. In the United States, the Outback was only offered with a single transmission choice, Subaru's continuously variable transmission branded Lineartronic. In Canada, a manual transmission was available with the 2.5-litre Base and Touring models until 2017.

=== North American models ===
Model	Transmission
2.5i, 2.5i Premium	Lineartronic CVT 6 speed MT – Touring in place of Premium with added features (Canada only)
2.5i Limited, PZEV (all trim levels)	Lineartronic CVT
3.6R Limited	Lineartronic CVT

=== Japanese models ===
Model	Transmission
2.5l DOHC Legacy Outback	Lineartronic CVT
2.5l DOHC Legacy Outback Limited	Lineartronic CVT

=== Southeast Asian models ===
Model available as of December 2, 2014, the fifth generation Subaru Outback was officially launched in Southeast Asian region. The fifth generation Outback debuted in the 2015 Manila International Auto Show in the Philippines. Motor Image Group, the distributor of Subaru automobiles in Southeast Asia, releases the four-cylinder variant of the Outback.

Model	Transmission
2.5i-S	Lineartronic CVT
3.6R-S	Lineartronic CVT

=== European models ===
Model	Transmission
2.5i Active	Lineartronic CVT
2.5i Ridge	Lineartronic CVT
2.5i Summit	Lineartronic CVT

=== United Kingdom models ===
Model	Transmission
2.5i SE, 2.5i SE Premium	Lineartronic CVT
2.0D SE, 2.0D SE Premium	Lineartronic CVT or Manual

=== South African models ===
The Subaru Outback is available in South Africa in two derivatives, the lower 2.5i-s ES and the 3.6R-S ES as the flagship. The car does not make use of the new FB25 but rather the old N/A EJ25. The 2.5l engine produces 129 kW (175 PS) at 5800 rpm and 235 N⋅m (24 kg⋅m) at 4000 rpm and the 3.6R engine produces 191 kW (260 PS) at 6000 rpm and 350 N⋅m (36 kg⋅m) at 4400 rpm. All derivatives are equipped with the Subaru Eyesight System.

=== Australian models ===
Model	Transmission
2.5i, 2.5i Premium	Lineartronic CVT
3.6R	Lineartronic CVT
2.0D SE, 2.0D SE Premium	Lineartronic CVT

=== Safety ===
Euro NCAP test results* Subaru Outback 2.0D 'Eyesight' (2014)
Test	Points	%
Overall:	5 /5 stars	
Adult occupant:	32	85%
Child occupant:	43	87%
Pedestrian:	10	73%
Safety assist:	25	70%

IIHS scores
Small overlap front (driver)	Good
Moderate overlap front (original test)	Good
Side (original test)	Good
Roof strength	Good
Head restraints and seats	Good
Front crash prevention: vehicle-to-vehicle	Superior
Child seat anchors (LATCH) ease of use	Marginal

== Sixth generation (BT; 2019) ==
Sixth generation
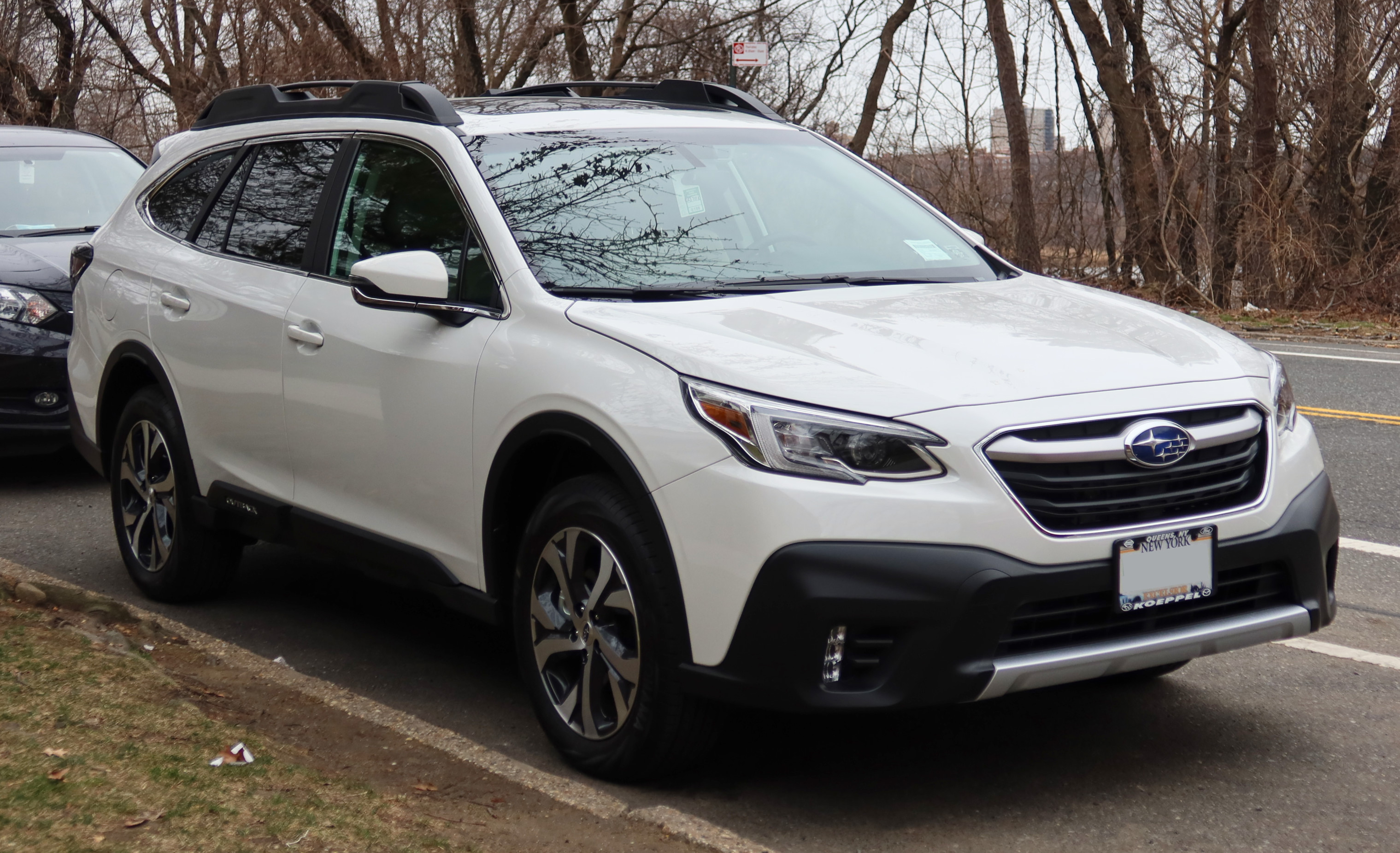
- Subaru Outback Limited (US, pre-facelift)

Overview
- Model code: BT
- Also called: Subaru Legacy Outback (Japan)
- Production: July 2019–2025
- Model years: 2020–2025

Body and chassis
- Body style: 5-door station wagon
- Platform: Subaru Global Platform
- Related: Subaru Legacy (seventh generation); Subaru Ascent

Powertrain
- Engine: Gasoline: 1.8 L CB18 turbo H4 (Japan); 2.4 L FA24F turbo H4; 2.5 L FB25D H4
- Power output: 130 kW (174 hp; 177 PS) (1.8T); 136 kW (182 hp; 185 PS) (2.5); 194 kW (260 hp; 264 PS) (2.4T)
- Transmission: 8-Speed Simulated Lineartronic CVT

Dimensions
- Wheelbase: 2,745 mm (108.1 in)
- Length: 4,860 mm (191.3 in)
- Width: 1,855 mm (73.0 in)
- Height: 1,680 mm (66.1 in)

Chronology
- Predecessor: Subaru Outback (fifth generation)

The revised Outback was premiered at the New York International Auto Show on April 17, 2019, and went on sale at United States dealerships starting in the third quarter of 2019 for the 2020 model year alongside the Legacy sedan. Changes and features mirror those made to the Legacy, and the raised suspension of the Outback provides a minimum ground clearance of 8.7 in (220 mm).

Subaru, due to the Outback, accounts for more than 80% of the new station wagons sold in the US.

=== North America ===
In North America, the engine options, like the Legacy, are the 2.5-litre FB25D flat-four that produces 182 hp (185 PS; 136 kW) at 5,800 rpm and the turbocharged 2.4-litre FA24F flat-four found on XT models that produces 260 hp (194 kW; 264 PS) at 5,600 rpm. In the U.S., it comes in Base, Premium, Onyx Edition, Limited and Touring. In Canada, it is available in Convenience, Touring, Outdoor, Limited and Premier.

==== Model year changes ====
2021: Steering responsive LED headlights, passenger seatbelt reminder and rear seatbelt reminder features became standard on all trims.

2022: The introduction of the Wilderness model, which sits between the Onyx Edition and Touring trims. Other changes include LED foglights became standard in all trims and the rear air-con vents became standard on the Premium trim.

2023: The Outback line-up received a refresh except for the Wilderness model, with a new front fascia, new headlights and additional front cladding. Inside, it features the latest version STARLINK® Multimedia Plus infotainment system with wireless Apple CarPlay and Android Auto and the first Subaru to integrate What3words (W3W) global location technology into its navigation system. The EyeSight system added a third wide-angle camera for the Touring trim and the Touring receives a standard LCD Smart Rearview Mirror display. The Onyx trim became available with the base non-turbo engine.

2024: The Wilderness model received an updated front fascia with new LED foglights. Other changes include a heated steering wheel became standard on the Onyx Edition trim.

2025: The Limited trim includes DriverFocus Distraction Mitigation System, a heated steering wheel, a powered sunroof and a STARLINK® 11.6-in Multimedia Navigation system as standard features.

=== International markets ===
The sixth-generation Outback was marketed outside of North America starting in 2021. The Outback was released in Australia on February 18, 2021, in three trim levels: Base, Sport and Touring, powered by a 2.5-litre FB25D gasoline engine. The 2.4-litre FA24F turbocharged gasoline engine was added to the line-up for the Sport and Touring trim levels, features dual exhaust pipes, unique six-LED foglights and an XT badge.

Thailand was the first ASEAN country to market the sixth-generation Outback on March 23, 2021, in Singapore on April 7, 2021, in the Philippines on August 23, 2021, in Vietnam on November 15, 2021, in Indonesia on August 10, 2023 at the 30th Gaikindo Indonesia International Auto Show, and Malaysia on September 20, 2024.

The sixth-generation Outback was released in the European market in April 2021, in two trim levels: Touring and Field, exclusively powered by a 2.5-litre FB25D gasoline engine.

The sixth-generation Outback was released in Taiwan on April 16, 2021 as a sole variant. The entry-level Lite variant followed at a later date.

The sixth-generation Outback was released in South Africa on May 3, 2021, in two trim levels: Field and Touring, with both trims comes with the EyeSight system; it is powered by a 2.5-litre FB25D gasoline engine. The 2.4-litre FA24F turbocharged gasoline engine was added for South Africa in May 2023.

The sixth-generation Outback was released in Japan on October 7, 2021 as the Legacy Outback, in two trim levels: X-BREAK and Limited, both trims comes with the EyeSight system. It is powered exclusively by the 1.8-litre CB18 turbocharged gasoline engine. In September 2023, the Legacy Outback received a few model improvements and the addition of a special edition Limited EX "Active × Black" model. In September 2024, the previous special edition "Active × Black" model was reintroduced as the "Active × Black EX" model, and a new special edition "Black Selection" model based on the Limited EX trim was added. In October 2024, a special edition 30th Anniversary model equipped with STi tuned dampers, based on the Limited EX trim, was sold in a limited run of 500 units. Subaru also announced that orders of the Legacy Outback in Japan was scheduled to end in March 2025, once the planned production volume is reached. The sixth-generation Outback is the last model under the Legacy model series to be marketed in Japan. The reason for the discontinuation in Japan, as Subaru's public relations department stated that, "it has fulfilled its role in the domestic market." Subaru is consolidating its lineup into smaller crossover station wagons, and also shifted its focus in the SUV market to the Levorg Layback exclusively sold in the Japanese market.

The sixth-generation Outback went on sale in Mexico on December 5, 2022, in two trim levels: Field and Touring, exclusively powered by a 2.4-litre FA24F turbocharged gasoline engine. At the time of its launch, the Outback was the only station wagon marketed in the country before the arrival of the WRX Wagon.

=== Outback Wilderness ===
The Subaru Outback Wilderness, was released in May 2021 as a 2022 model for the North American market, is a more off-road focused version of the standard Outback. It is the first vehicle to be launched under Subaru's new "Wilderness" brand. The suspension is raised to 9.5 inches (240 mm), 0.8 in (20 mm) more than the standard Outback's 8.7 inches (220 mm) of ground clearance. All-terrain tires wrapped around black 17-inch wheels are also added to the Outback Wilderness. There is more extensive plastic body cladding as well as integrated tow hooks. The roof rack on the Outback Wilderness is changed and is rated for up to 700 pounds (320 kg). The Wilderness has a shorter final drive ratio of 4.44:1 compared to the 4.11:1 in the standard Outback. The only engine option for the Wilderness is the turbocharged 2.4L FA24F 4-cylinder boxer engine. Interior changes include orange stitching and accents as well as water resistant "StarTex" seats, also found on the Onyx edition Outback.

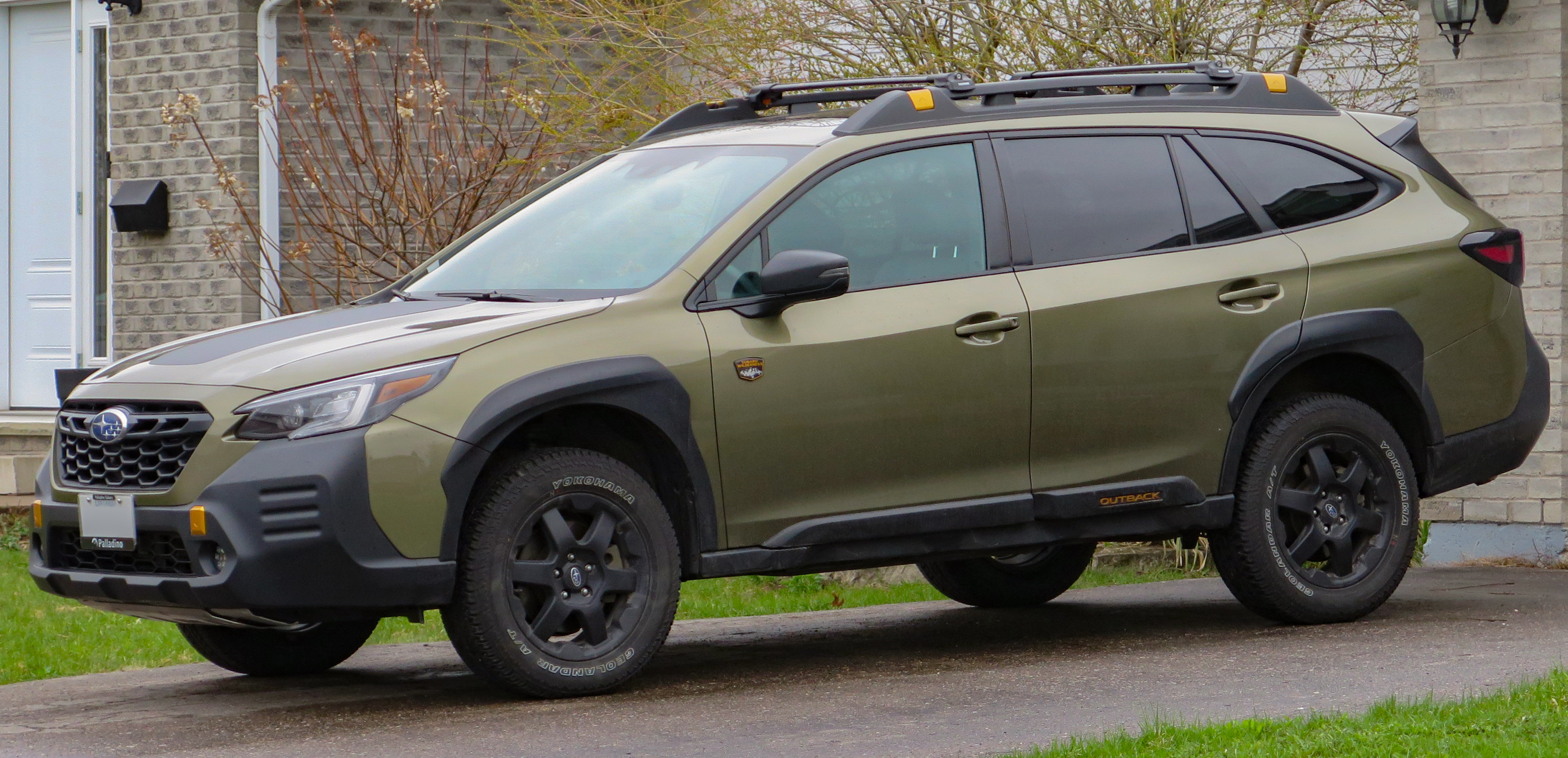
Subaru Outback Wilderness (US)

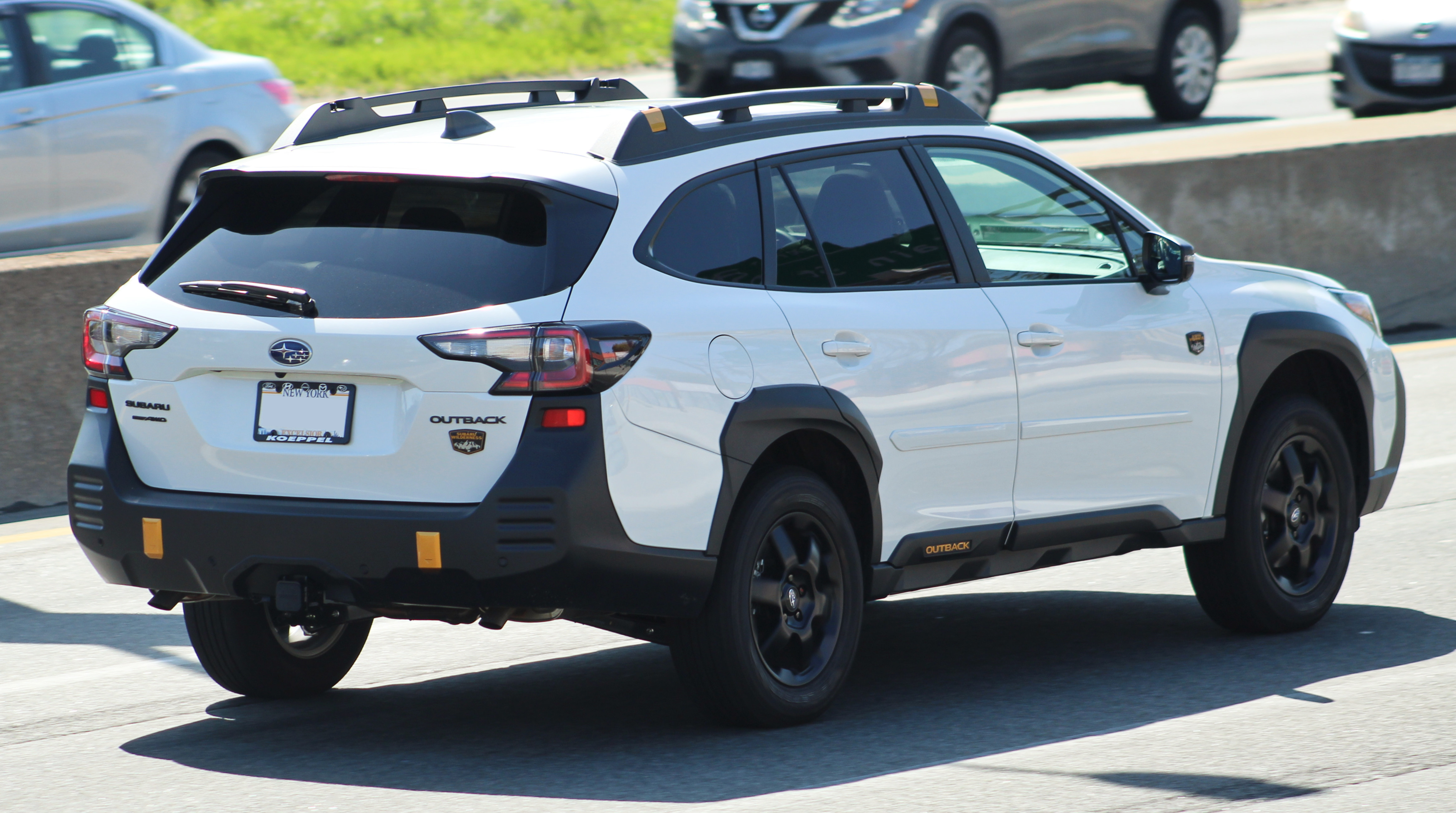
Rear view

=== Gallery ===
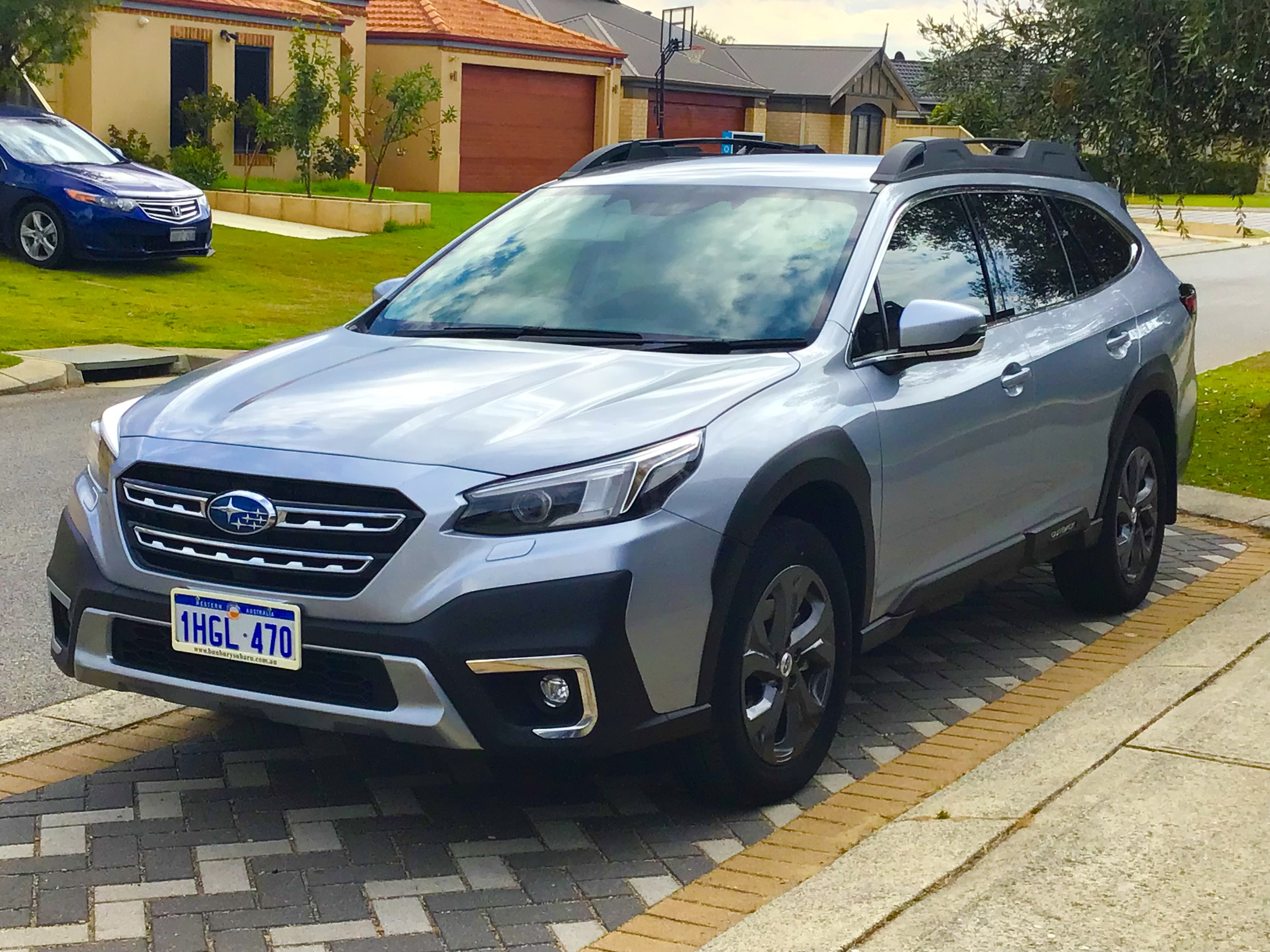
Subaru Outback (global model, Australia)

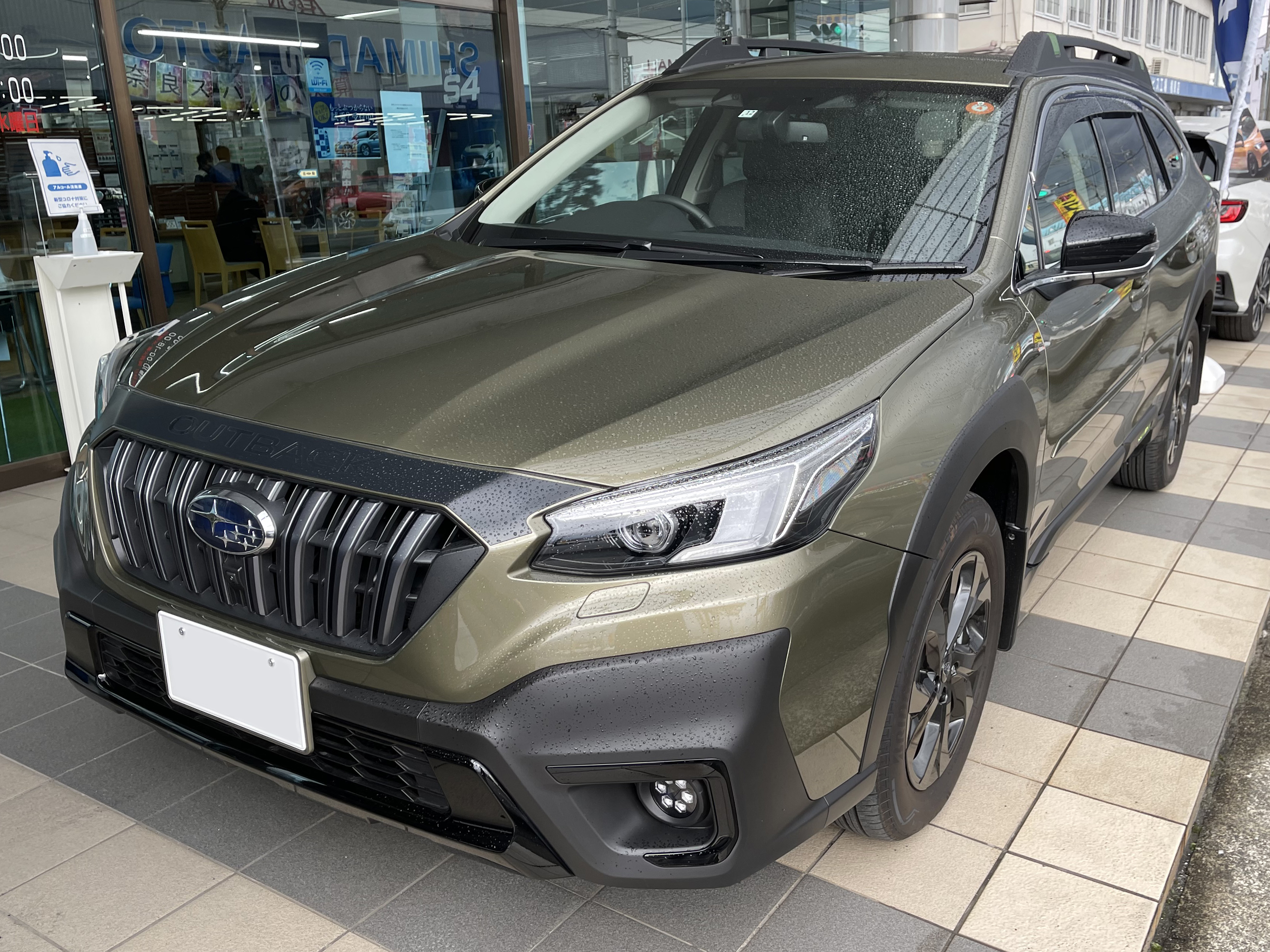
Subaru Legacy Outback X-Break EX with official accessories (Japan)

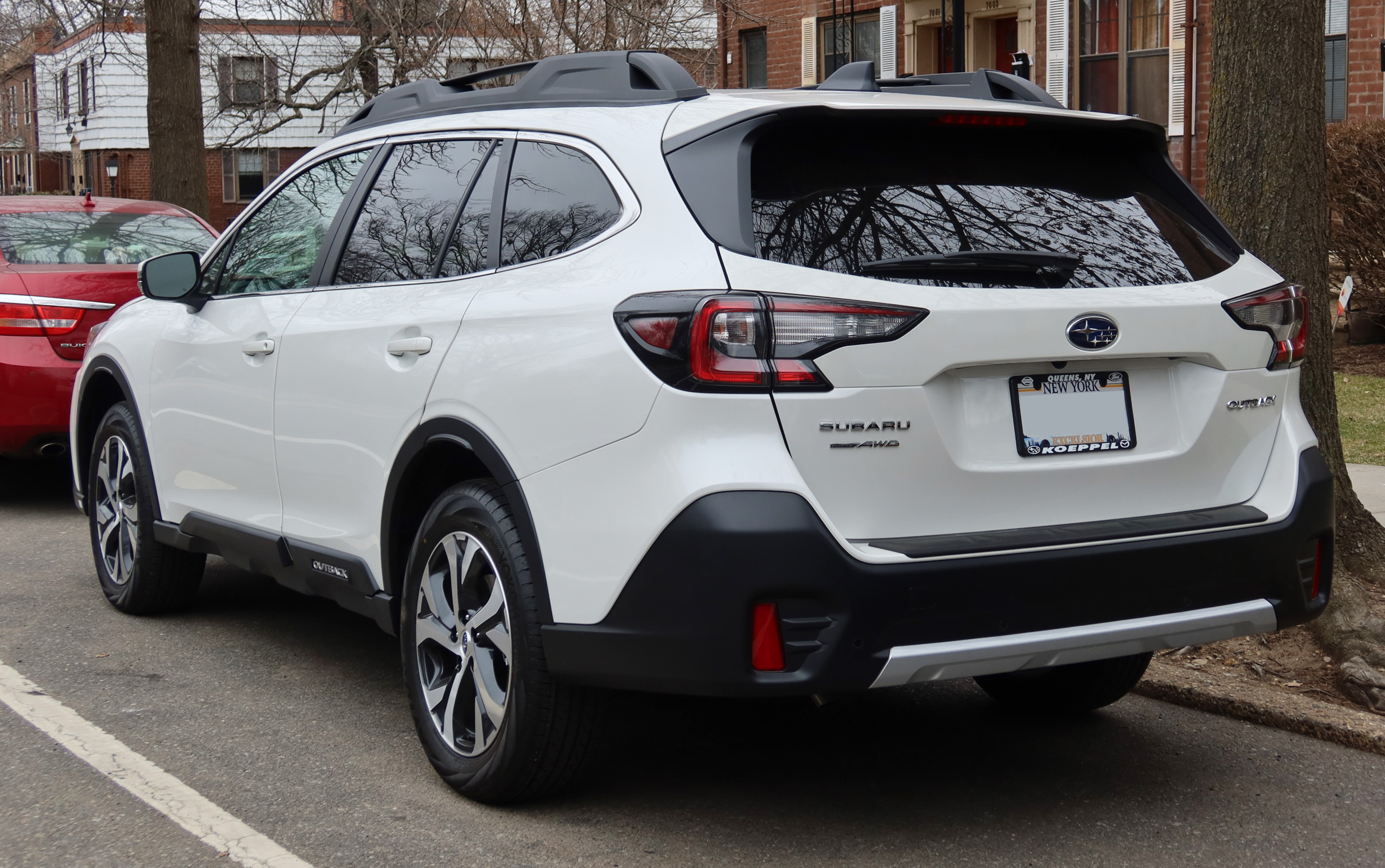
Rear view (US, pre-facelift)

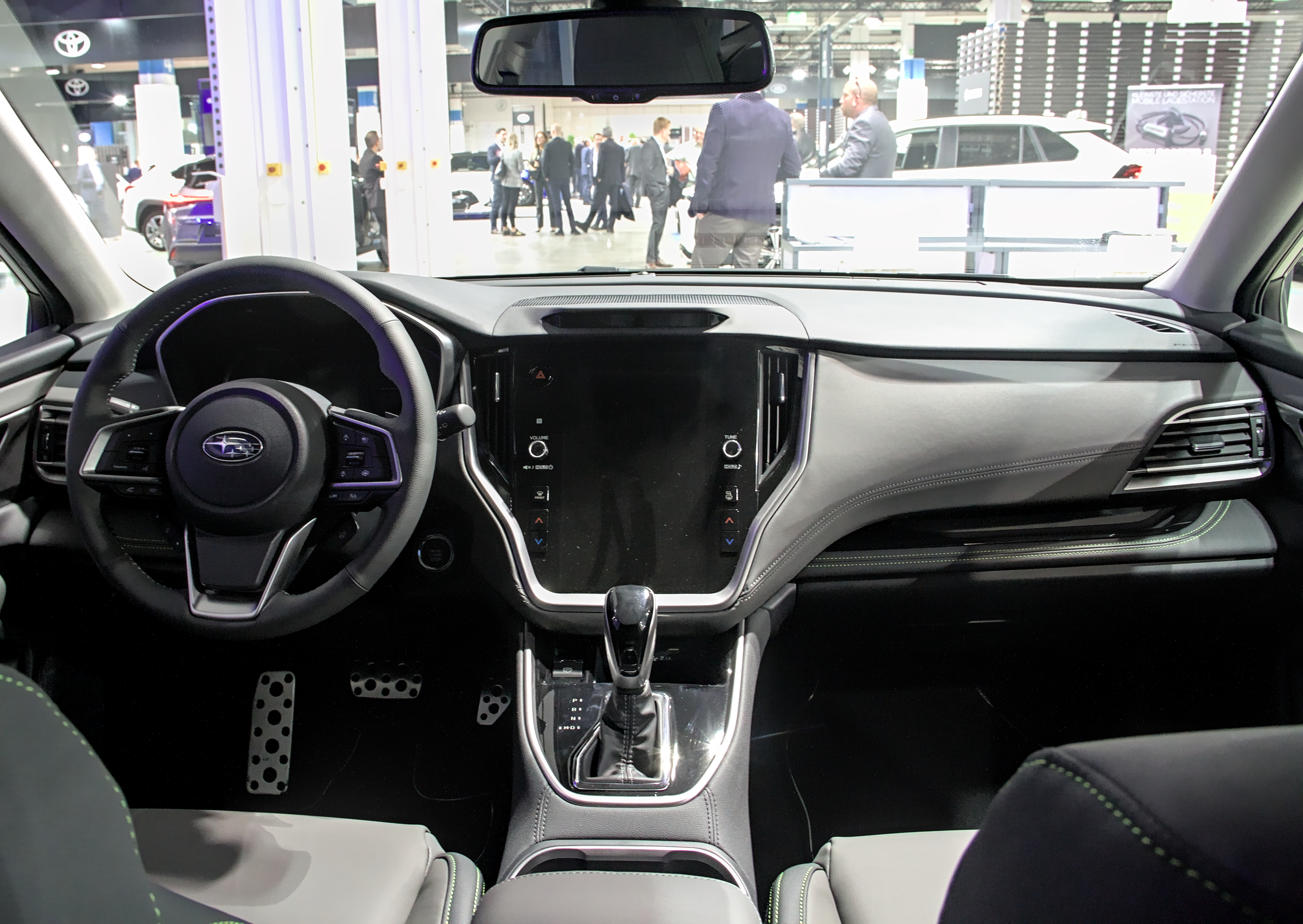
Interior

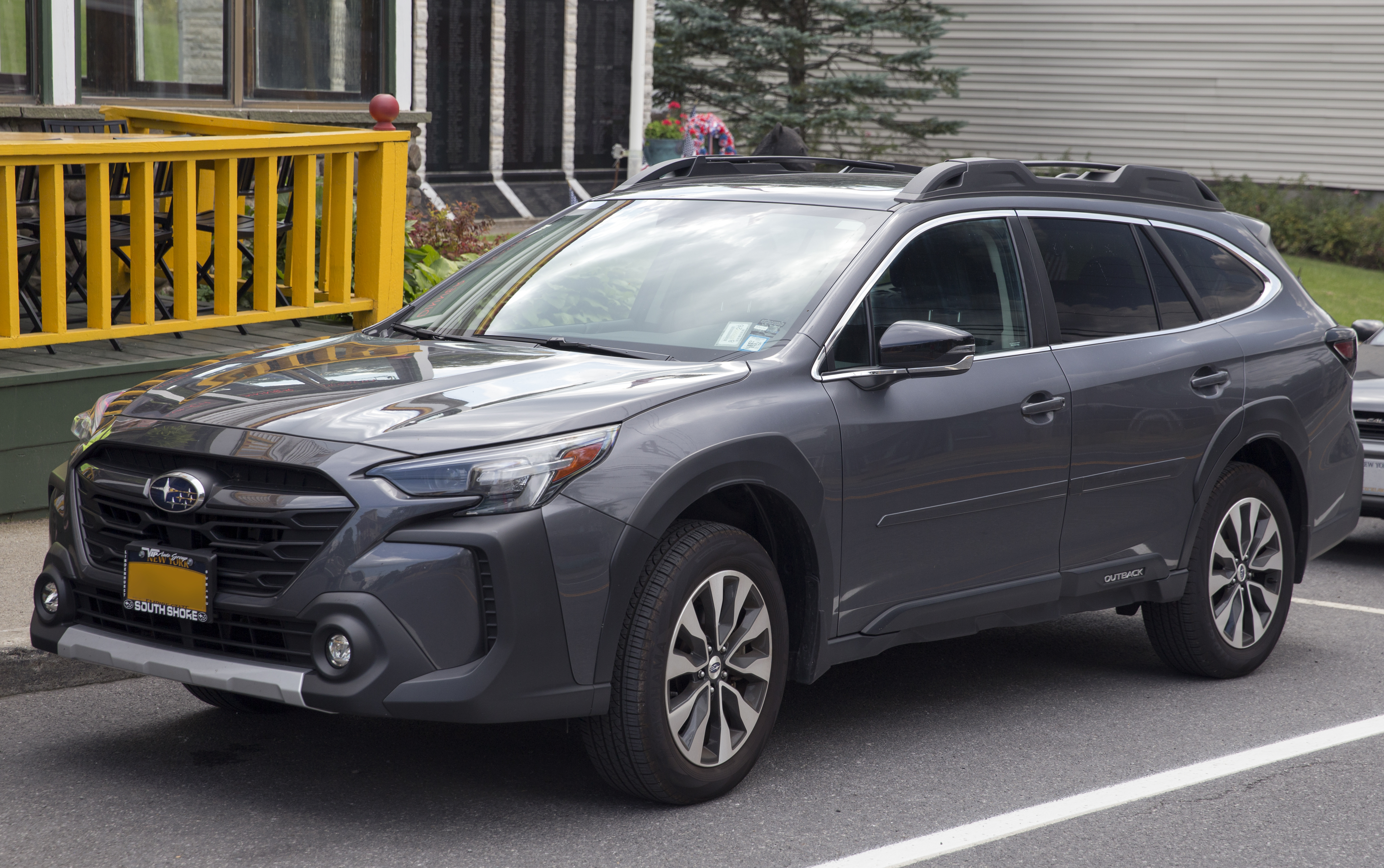
Front view of Outback Limited (US, facelift)

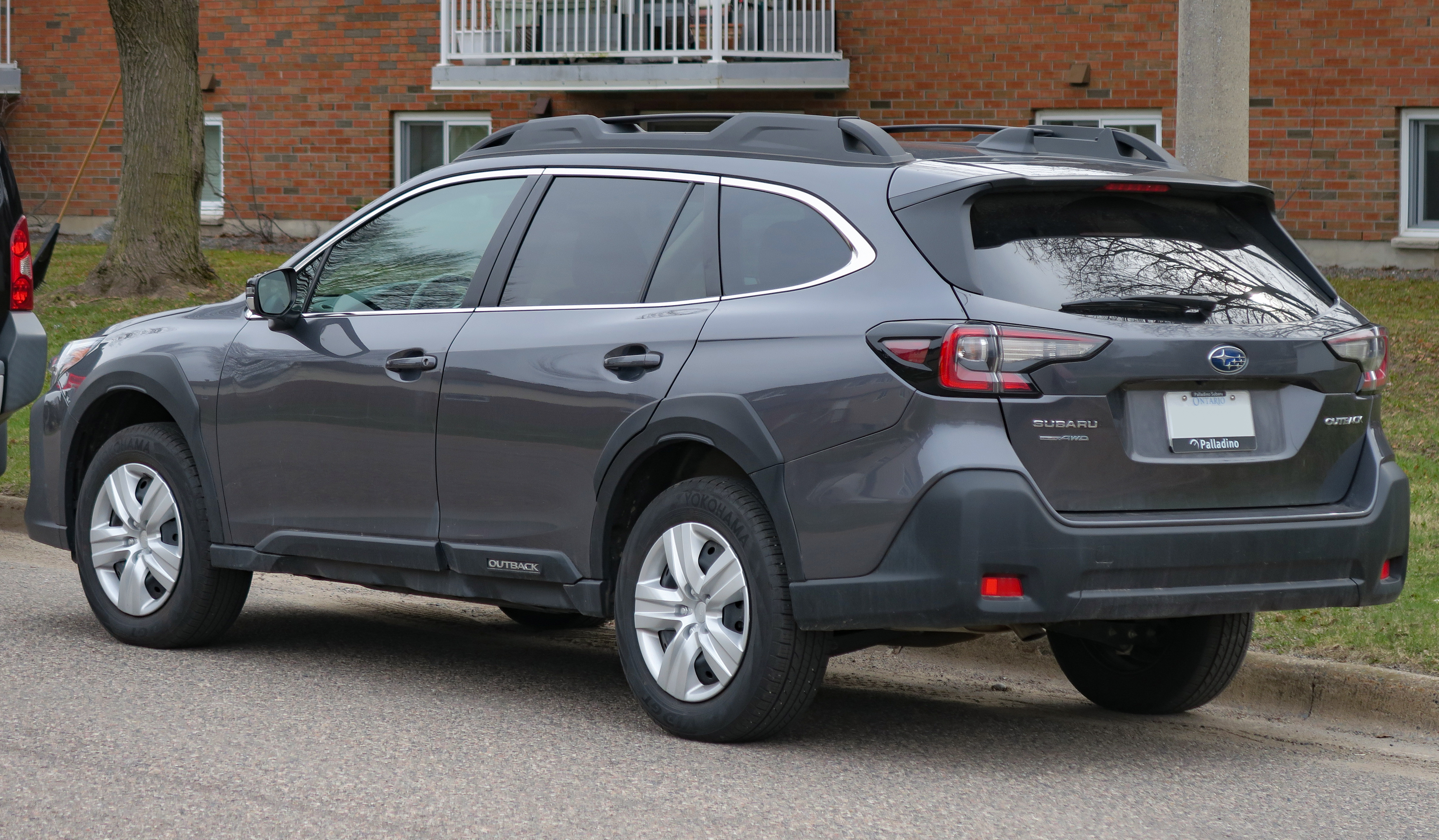
Rear view of Outback Convenience (Canada, facelift)

=== Safety ===
ANCAP test results* Subaru Outback (2015)
Test	Score
Overall	5 /5 stars
Frontal offset	14.99/16
Side impact	16/16
Pole	2/2
Seat belt reminders	3/3
Whiplash protection	Good
Pedestrian protection	Adequate
Electronic stability control	Standard

ANCAP test results Subaru Outback (2021, aligned with Euro NCAP)
Test	Points	%
Overall:	5 /5 stars	
Adult occupant:	33.56	88%
Child occupant:	44.52	91%
Pedestrian:	45.40	84%
Safety assist:	15.40	96%

IIHS scores
Small overlap front (driver)	Good		
Small overlap front (passenger)	Good		
Moderate overlap front (original test)	Good		
Side (original test)	Good		
Side (updated test)	Good		
Roof strength	Good		
Head restraints and seats	Good		
Headlights (varies by trim/option)	Good	Acceptable	Marginal
Front crash prevention: vehicle-to-vehicle	Superior		
Front crash prevention: vehicle-to-vehicle (Day)	Superior		
Child seat anchors (LATCH) ease of use	Good+		

== Seventh generation (BU; 2025) ==
Seventh generation
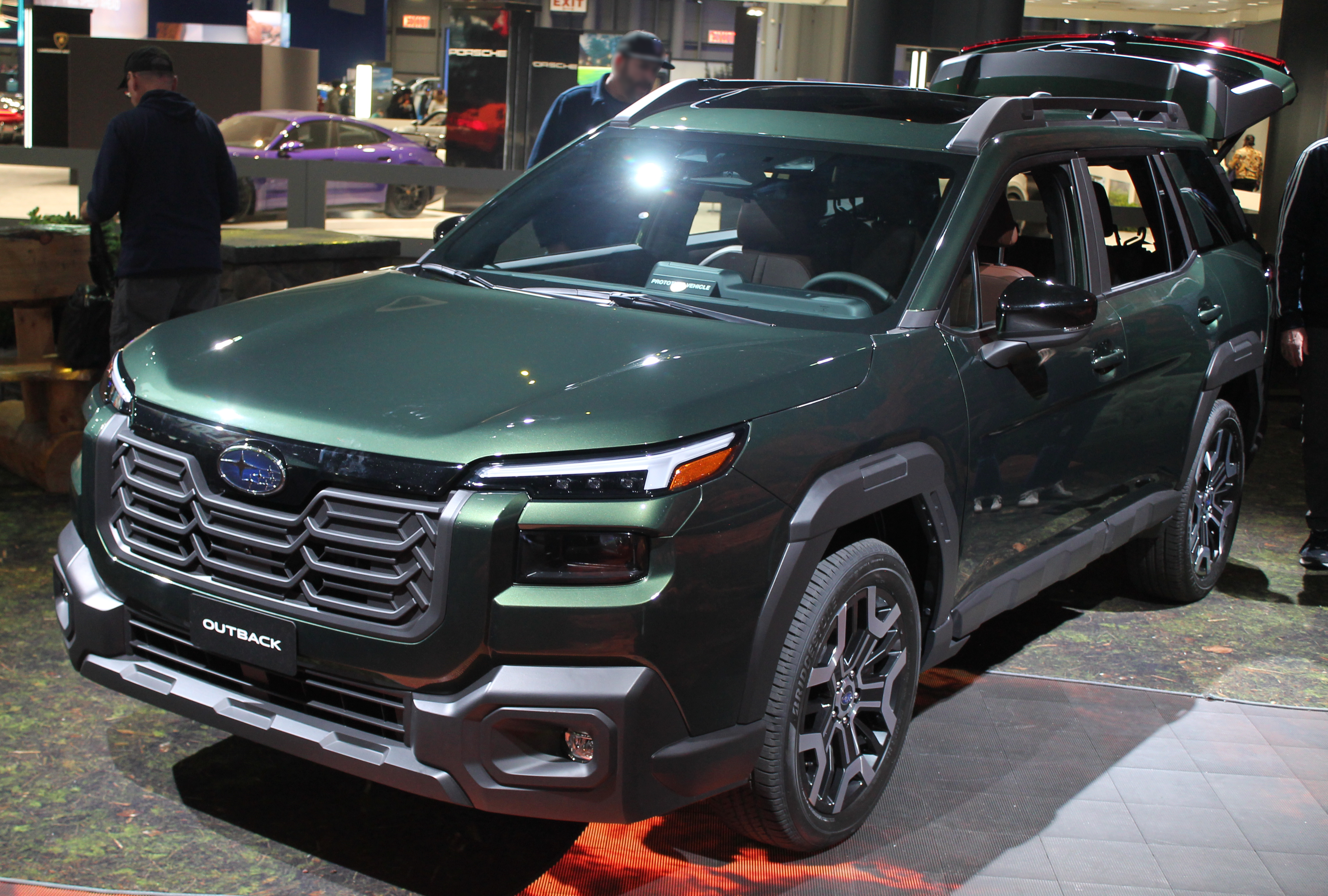
- 2026 Subaru Outback

Overview
- Model code: BU
- Production: 2025–present
- Model years: 2026–present

Body and chassis
- Body style: 5-door SUV
- Platform: Subaru Global Platform

Powertrain
- Engine: Gasoline: 2.4 L FA24F turbo H4 (XT); 2.5 L FB25D H4
- Transmission: CVT

Dimensions
- Wheelbase: 2,745 mm (108.1 in)
- Length: 4,869 mm (191.7 in)
- Width: 1,880 mm (74.0 in)
- Height: 1,715–1,735 mm (67.5–68.3 in)
- Curb weight: 1,697–1,806 kg (3,741–3,982 lb)

The seventh-generation Subaru Outback was revealed on April 16, 2025. It went on sale in North America in late 2025 for the 2026 model year.

=== Design ===
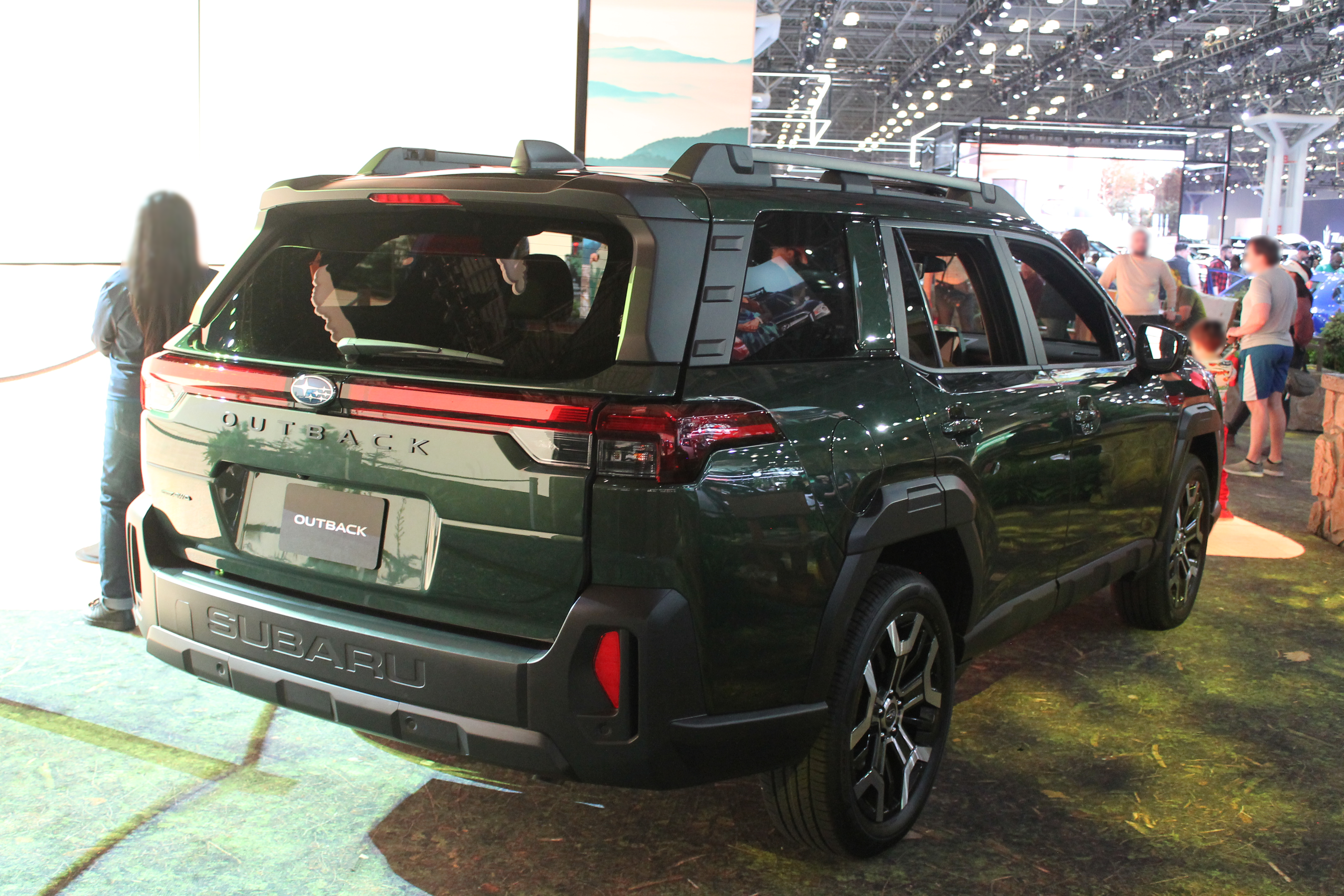
Rear view

The seventh-generation Outback transitioned to a crossover SUV compared to the raised station wagon of its predecessor with a boxier shape, taller roofline, increased use of exterior body cladding, and its platform is not shared with a sedan car (with the discontinuation of the Legacy in 2025). Subaru said the boxy design was chosen for the Outback to emphasize the increased height of the vehicle and its durability.

Evan Lindsey, the Car Line Manager responsible for the Outback's packaging and pricing at Subaru Canada, explained the reasons for the Outback's design: "From a design perspective, there were some restrictions in terms of how tall the profile of the vehicle could be because it had to share its proportions with a sedan... That's why the lower, sleeker profile of the Outback carried through. However, with this new seventh generation, we're not restricted by those sedan proportions."

Lindsey also explained about the Outback was designed to meet various consumer demands, "Within focus groups and design clinics and that sort of thing, there's kind of two camps... There were Outback owners that absolutely loved the design and they said, 'Hey, don't change it'". The other group claimed the previous Outback did not "look SUV-like enough," according to Lindsey. He further explained, "It's kind of taking those attributes that existing Outback buyers appreciate and enhancing them... But also at the same time from a styling and design perspective, broadening the appeal."

The front fascia has split headlights and a larger rectangular grille. The side has squared-off wheel arches opposed to the round shape of its predecessor, standard roof rails however the foldaway crossbars have been omitted, a widen C-pillar design with a body-colored trim piece, and 19-inch alloy wheels are available for the first time in the Outback's history. The rear features a full-width taillight bar which also incorporates a ruler used to measure objects which is 2 ft (61 cm) in length, "OUTBACK" badging on the rear hatch, and the Subaru logo is embossed on the black plastic bumper.

=== Interior ===
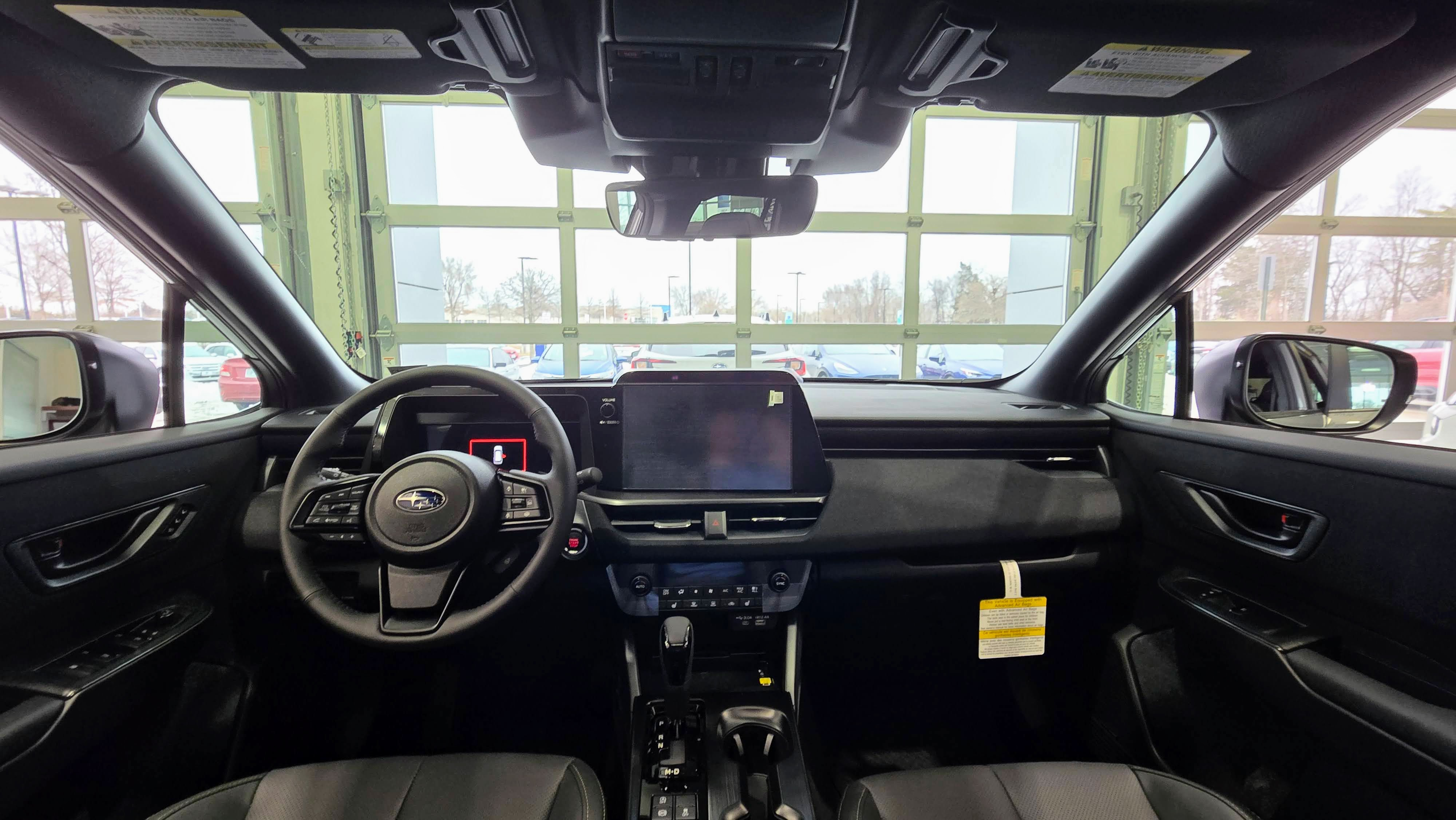
2026 Outback interior

Inside, there is a 12.1-inch touchscreen infotainment system, a 12.3-inch digital instrument cluster with four configurable views, a cloud-based voice assistant system, physical buttons and knobs are used for HVAC system instead of touchscreen-based controls, and the X-Mode system is operated via a button on the steering wheel. The infotainment system is powered by Google Android Automotive-based operating system, and features a faster processor and wireless capability for Apple CarPlay and Android Auto.

Subaru added sound absorbing materials in the headliner and roof. Compared to its predecessor, wind noise has been reduced by 10% as a result of aerodynamic elements in the body sides and roof rails.

Front and rear passenger seats feature "low-fatigue" seats mounted directly to the chassis. Combined with the taller roofline, this results in increased headroom for the front and rear occupants.

Due to the taller figure, the cargo space has a larger maximum cargo space of 34.3 cu ft (970 L) and a load floor width of 43.3 in (1.1 m). On this version of the Outback, the load floor was raised by 2 inches (51 mm).

=== Outback Wilderness ===
Like its predecessor, the seventh-generation Outback continued to be available with an off-road focused Wilderness model alongside the standard model.

The Wilderness model features 17-inch alloy wheels wrapped in Bridgestone Dueler all terrain tires, anodized copper elements for the foglights, reverse lights and roof rails, black exterior trim, an expanded front bumper, the grille features Subaru lettering instead of the brand's logo, improved tow hooks, round LED hexagonal fog lights, reinforced underbody protection, the roof weight has a static load capacity of 800 lb (360 kg) (the load capacity drops to 220 lb (100 kg) when the vehicle is moving), and a maximum towing capacity of 3,500 lb (1,600 kg).

Inside, the Wilderness model features anodized copper interior accents, water resistant "StarTex" upholstery which is made from animal-free materials, and utility hooks mounted inside the cargo area can hold a maximum weight of 6 lb (2.7 kg). For the first time, the Wilderness model is available with options such as a 360-degree Surround View Monitor, a moonroof, Nappa leather upholstery and ventilated front seats.

The Wilderness model has the approach, breakover and departure angles set at 20º, 21.2º and 22.5º, respectively. Compared to the standard model, the Wilderness model features a revised Symmetrical All Wheel Drive system which also incorporates steering angle data, additional Snow/Dirt and Deep Snow/Mud driving modes for the X-Mode system, and a revised suspension with the inclusion of electronically controlled dampers.

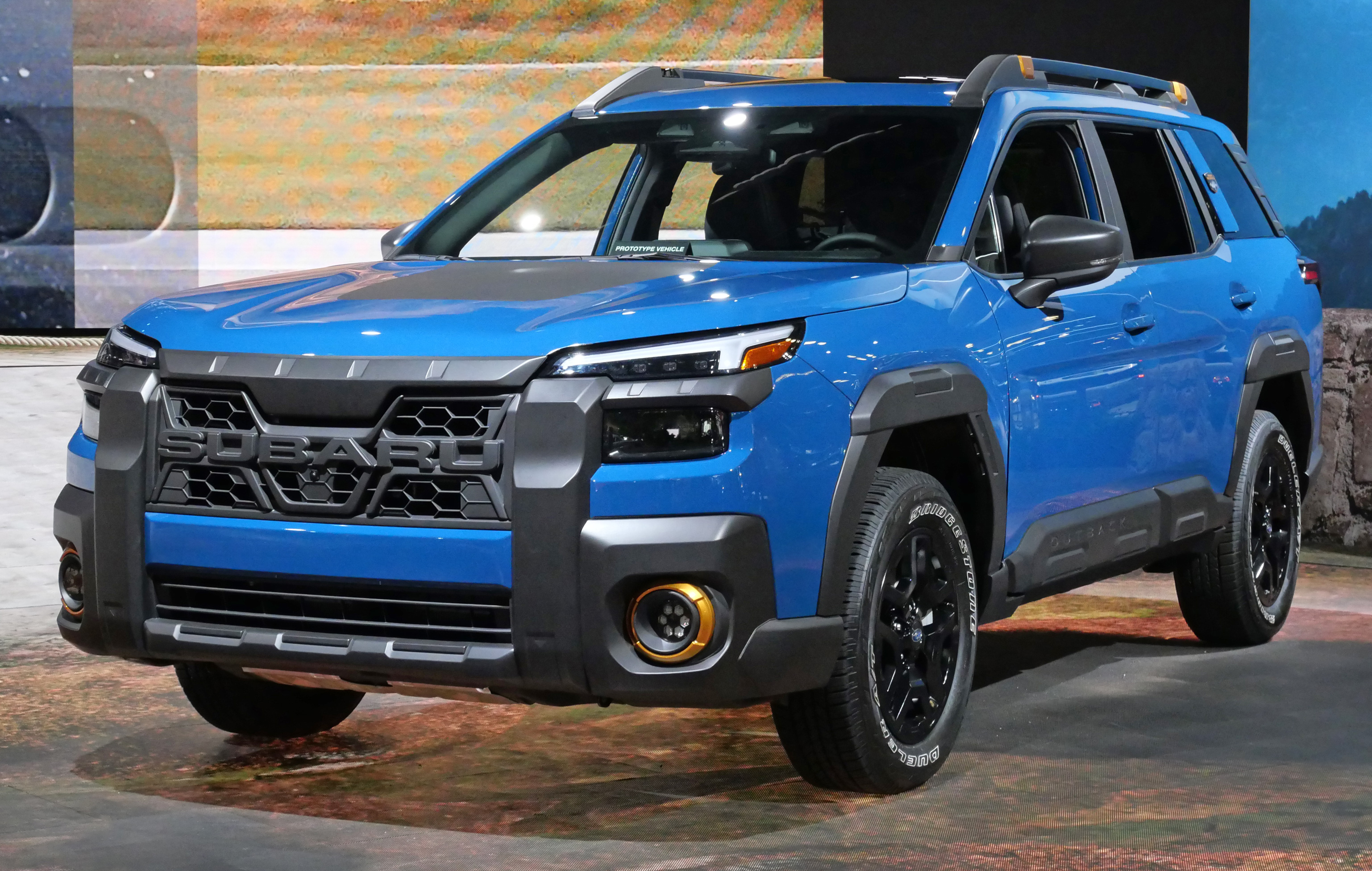
2026 Subaru Outback Wilderness (US)

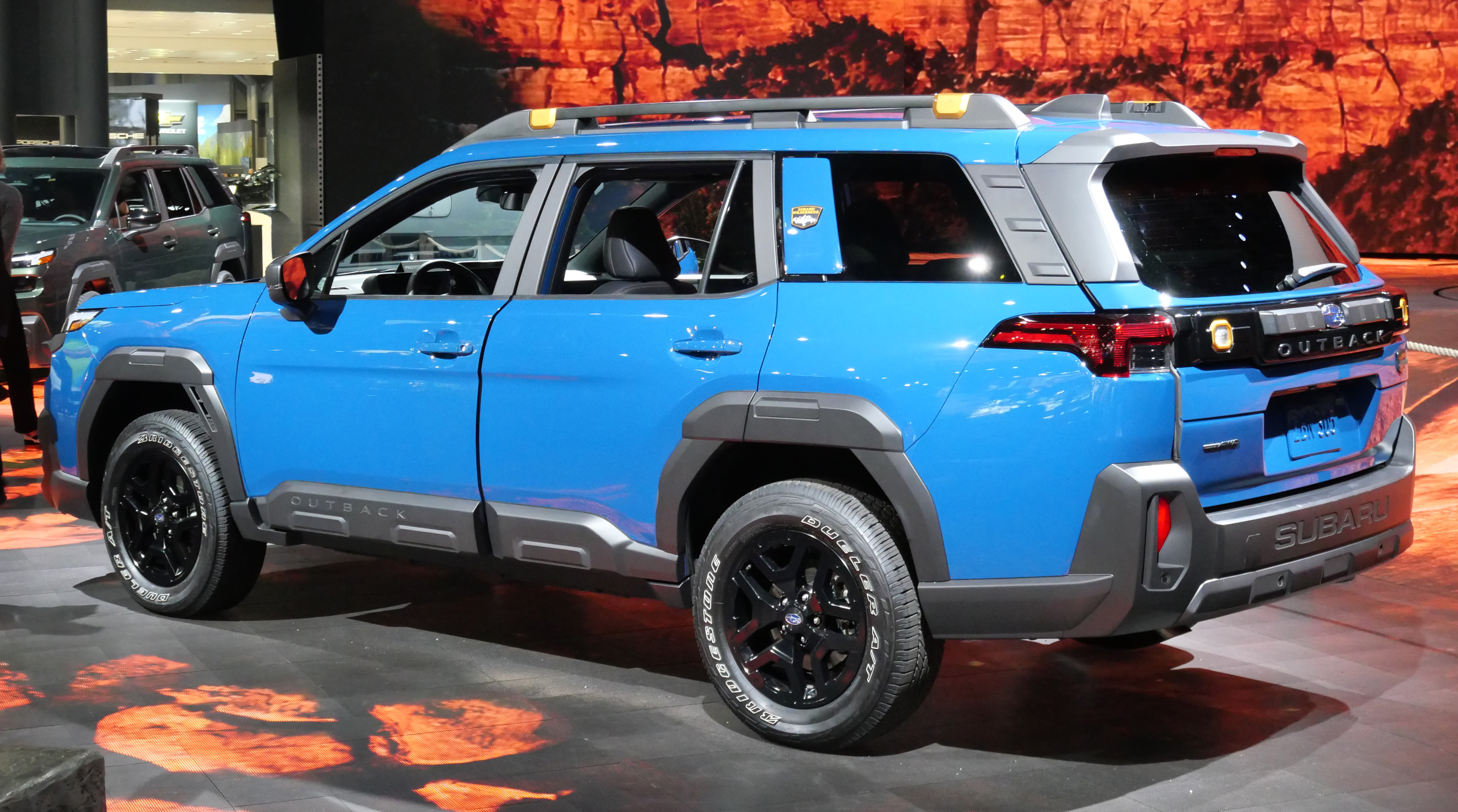
Rear view

=== Engines ===
The base engine is a naturally aspirated 2.5-liter boxer four-cylinder making 180 hp (134 kW; 182 PS) and 178 lb⋅ft (241 N⋅m) of torque, while the XT and Wilderness trims continue with a turbocharged 2.4-liter boxer four-cylinder (XT) delivering 260 hp (194 kW; 264 PS) and 277 lb⋅ft (376 N⋅m). Both engines are paired to a continuously variable automatic transmission and standard symmetrical all-wheel drive. The regular models have a 8.7-inch (22 cm) ground clearance, while the wilderness model has 9.5 inches (24 cm) of ground clearance.

=== Markets ===
==== Argentina ====
The seventh-generation Outback was launched in Argentina on September 25, 2026, in the sole unnamed variant powered by the 2.5-liter boxer four-cylinder engine.

==== Australia ====
The seventh-generation Outback went on sale in Australia on November 27, 2025, with five variants: Standard 2.5, Premium 2.5, Touring 2.5, Wilderness 2.4T and Wilderness Apex 2.4T.

==== Indonesia ====
The seventh-generation Outback was launched in Indonesia on July 29, 2026 at the 33rd Gaikindo Indonesia International Auto Show, as the first ASEAN country to market the seventh-generation Outback. It is available in the sole 2.5i-Touring EyeSight variant powered by the 2.5-liter boxer four-cylinder engine.

==== Mexico ====
The seventh-generation Outback was launched in Mexico on February 12, 2026, with two variants: Touring CVT and Wilderness XT CVT.

==== New Zealand ====
The seventh-generation Outback was released in New Zealand in February 2026, with five variants: AWD, AWD Premium, AWD Touring, AWD Wilderness and AWD Wilderness Apex. The standard models are powered by the 2.5-liter boxer four-cylinder engine and the Wilderness models are powered by the turbocharged 2.4-liter boxer four-cylinder engine.

==== North America ====
The seventh-generation Outback was released in the North American market on August 22, 2025, for the 2026 model year. In the US, it is available with six trim levels: Premium, Limited, Limited XT, Wilderness, Touring and Touring XT. In Canada, it is available with four trim levels: Touring, XT Limited, Wilderness, and XT Premier.

=== Safety ===
For safety, the seventh-generation Outback is equipped with Subaru's EyeSight system, which also enables hands-free driving on highways up to speeds of 85 mph (137 km/h). The EyeSight system features a number of advanced driver-assistance systems, it includes Emergency Stop Assist with Safe Lane Selection for the first time on a Subaru vehicle, the system activates if the driver becomes unresponsive to warnings by pulling the vehicle over to a safe stop then alerting emergency services.

ANCAP test results Subaru Outback (2026, aligned with Euro NCAP)
Test	Score
Overall:	5 /5 stars
Safe driving	64%
Crash avoidance	66%
Crash protection	92%
Post crash	80%

== Outback Sport ==
Subaru also released the first generation Impreza-based Outback Sport in 1994 to North America only for the 1995 model year. Derived from the Impreza hatchback, the Outback Sport initially featured an off-road appearance package with two-tone paint; otherwise, the mechanics of the platform were unchanged.

=== First generation (1994–2001) ===
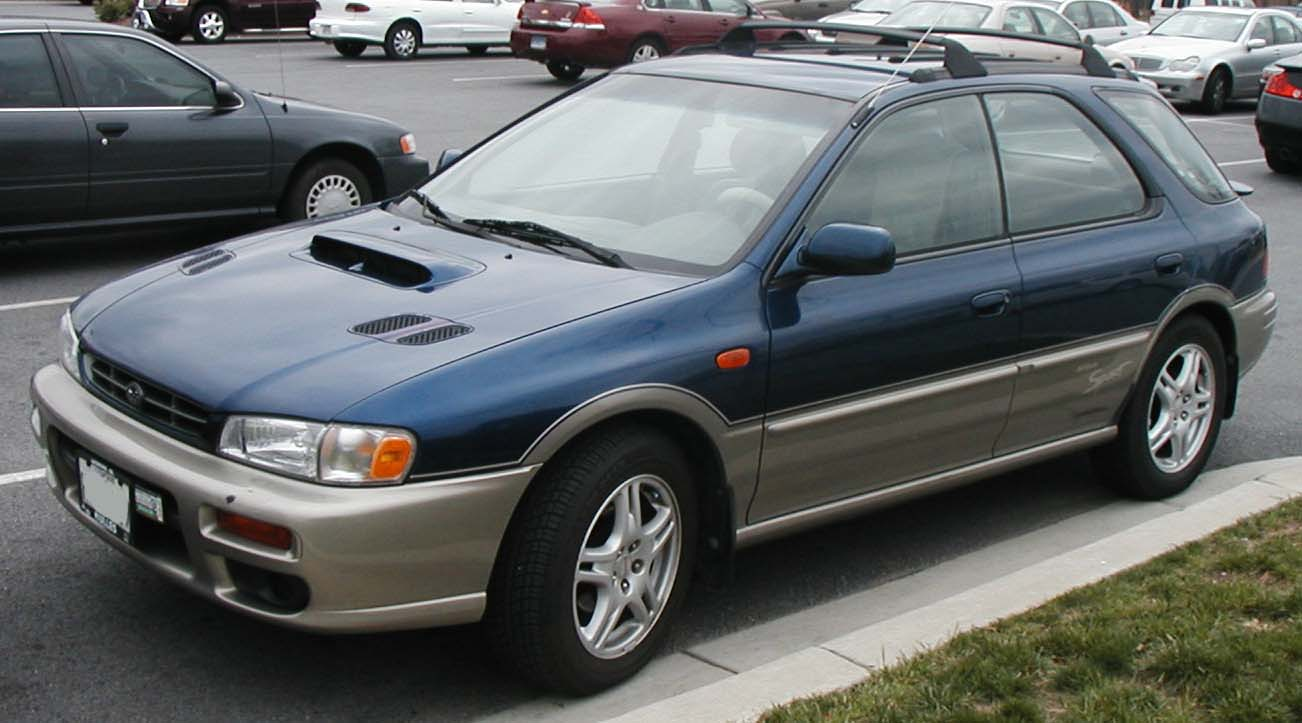
Outback Sport (first generation) 1994–2001

The first Impreza Outback Sport was introduced for the 1995 model year as a trim line based on the "L Active Safety Group", which included all-wheel-drive and front and rear disc anti-lock brakes. The standard engine was a 1.8-litre EJ18 or a slightly larger 2.2-litre EJ22, both paired to a manual transmission. An optional automatic transmission was available for vehicles fitted with the 2.2-litre engine. In addition, the Outback Sport received a roof rack and mud flaps, but ground clearance was unchanged from the Impreza wagon on which it was based at 6.3 in (160 mm). The 1997 model year Outback Sport had larger tires than the Impreza and an increased ground clearance of 6.4 to 6.5 in (160 to 170 mm).

The Outback Sport was priced lower and aimed at a younger buyer than the Legacy-based Outback. Advertisements for the Outback Sport featured an actor who referred to Paul Hogan as his "uncle".

=== Second generation (2001–2007) ===
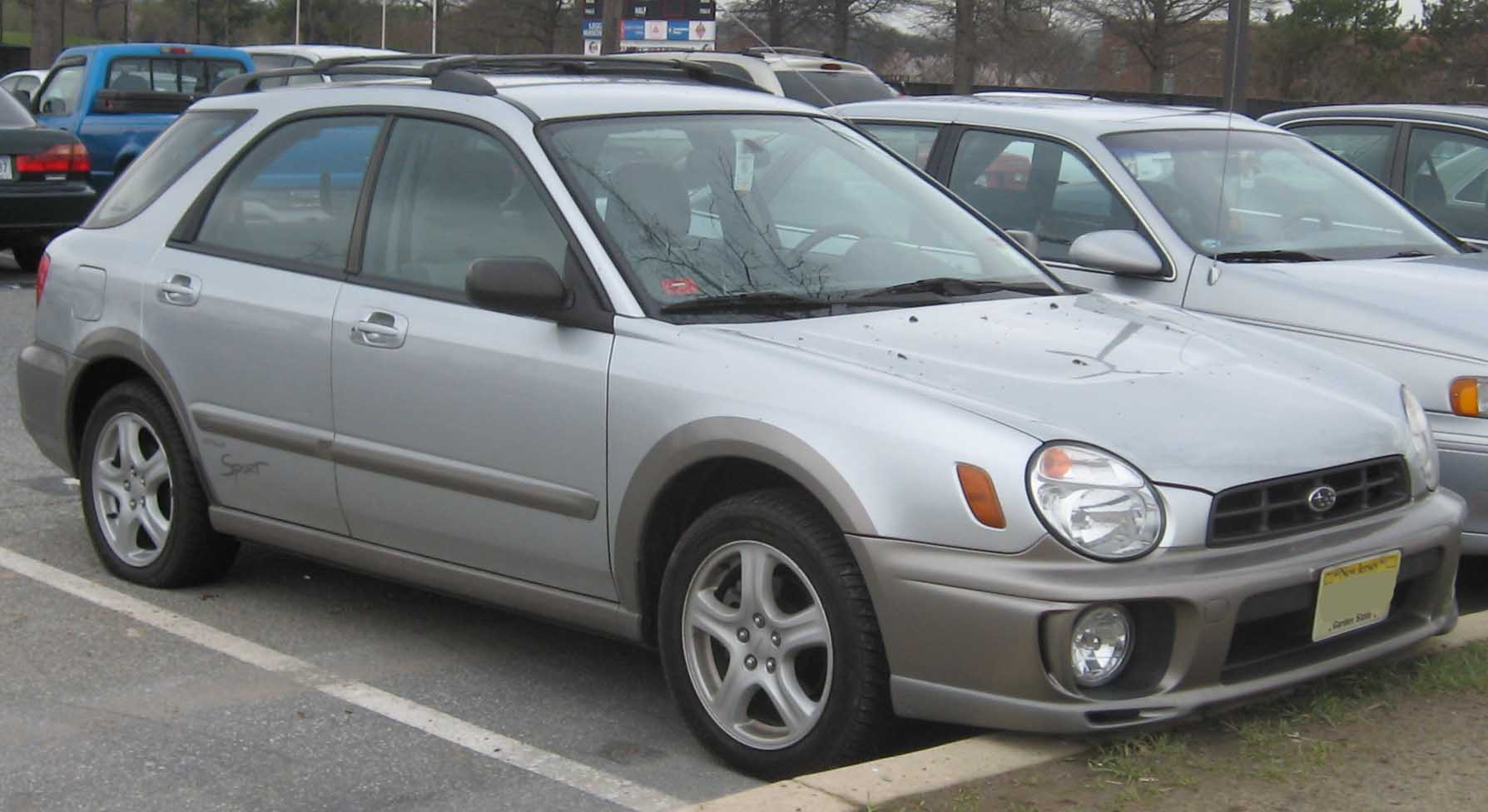
Outback Sport (second generation) 2001–2007

Subaru in North America launched the subsequent generation in 2001 for the 2002 model year based on the second generation Impreza. In Australia, the Impreza RV incorporated similar styling changes.

=== Third generation (2007–2011) ===
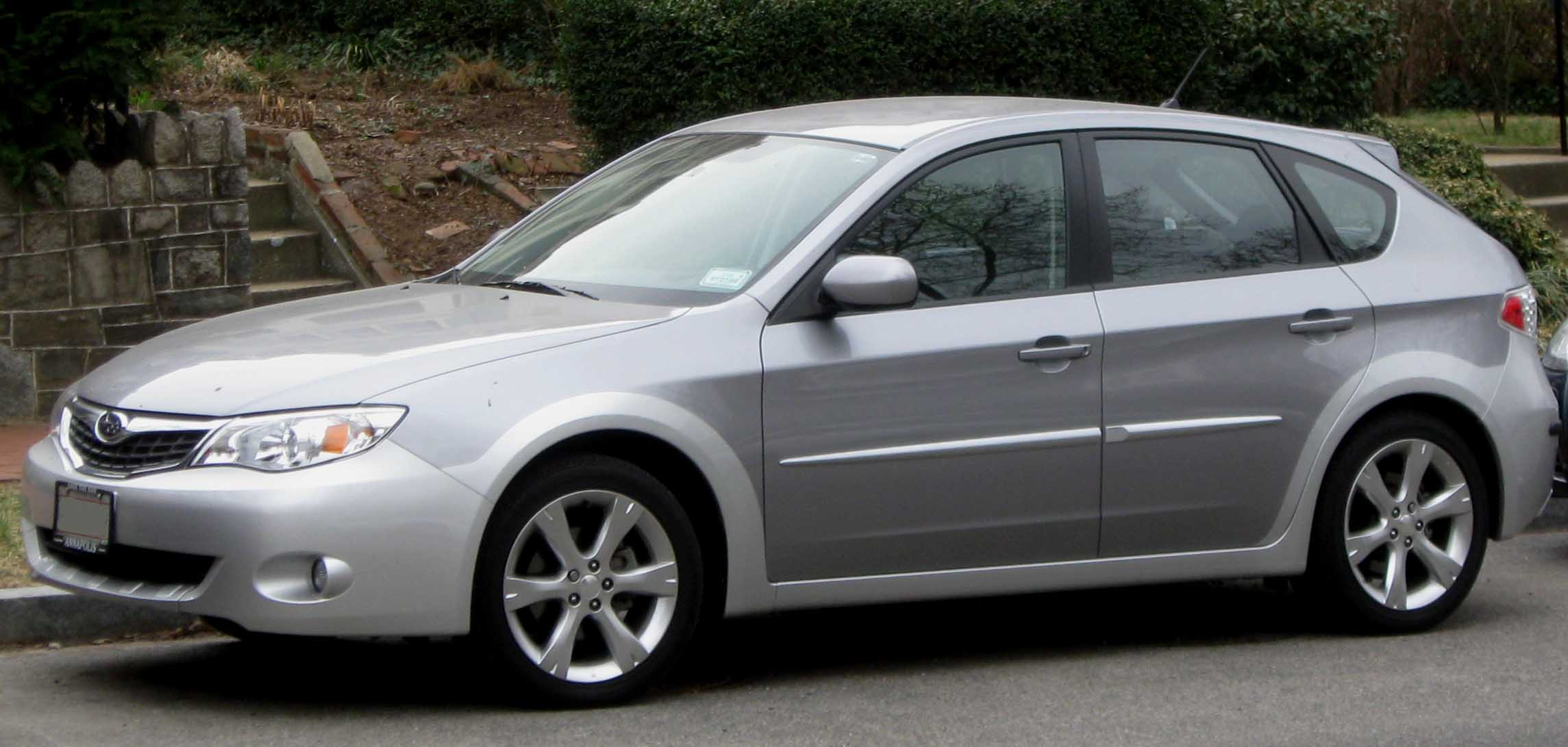
Outback Sport (third generation) 2007–2011

Subaru in North America launched the subsequent generation in 2007 for model year 2008 based on the third generation Impreza.

Subaru introduced the Impreza XV for the European and Australian markets at the 2010 Geneva Motor Show. The XV adopted the same changes that were made for the USDM Outback Sport, but the concept XV used the 2.0-litre turbodiesel EE20 or 2.0-litre turbo EJ20 engines available in other European Impreza variants. In Australia, the XV replaced the RV line, equipped with the naturally aspirated EJ20. It is succeeded by the Subaru XV/Crosstrek.

== Sales ==
Calendar year	United States	Canada	Japan	Australia
1994	1,238			
1995	14,805			
1996	48,208			749
1997	54,594			2,007
1998	56,732			2,868
1999	60,575			4,219
2000	64,582			5,622
2001	70,605			6,253
2002	60,974			5,720
2003	54,930			5,387
2004	62,594			6,658
2005	59,570			6,104
2006	59,109			6,165
2007	56,078			6,155
2008	44,262			4,379
2009	55,356			3,716
2010	93,148	6,401		5,766
2011	104,085	7,072		4,770
2012	117,553	7,049		4,408
2013	118,049	6,120		3,934
2014	138,790	8,688		2,457
2015	152,294	9,992		10,927
2016	182,898	11,255		12,207
2017	188,886	11,490		11,340
2018	178,854	10,954		10,378
2019	181,178	10,972		7,210
2020	153,290	12,556	3,424	4,928
2021	154,623	11,264	1,849	10,490
2022	147,262	5,838	9,697	9,739
2023	161,812		6,460	12,903
2024	168,771		5,725	10,227
