= Kia Sportage =

Compact crossover SUV

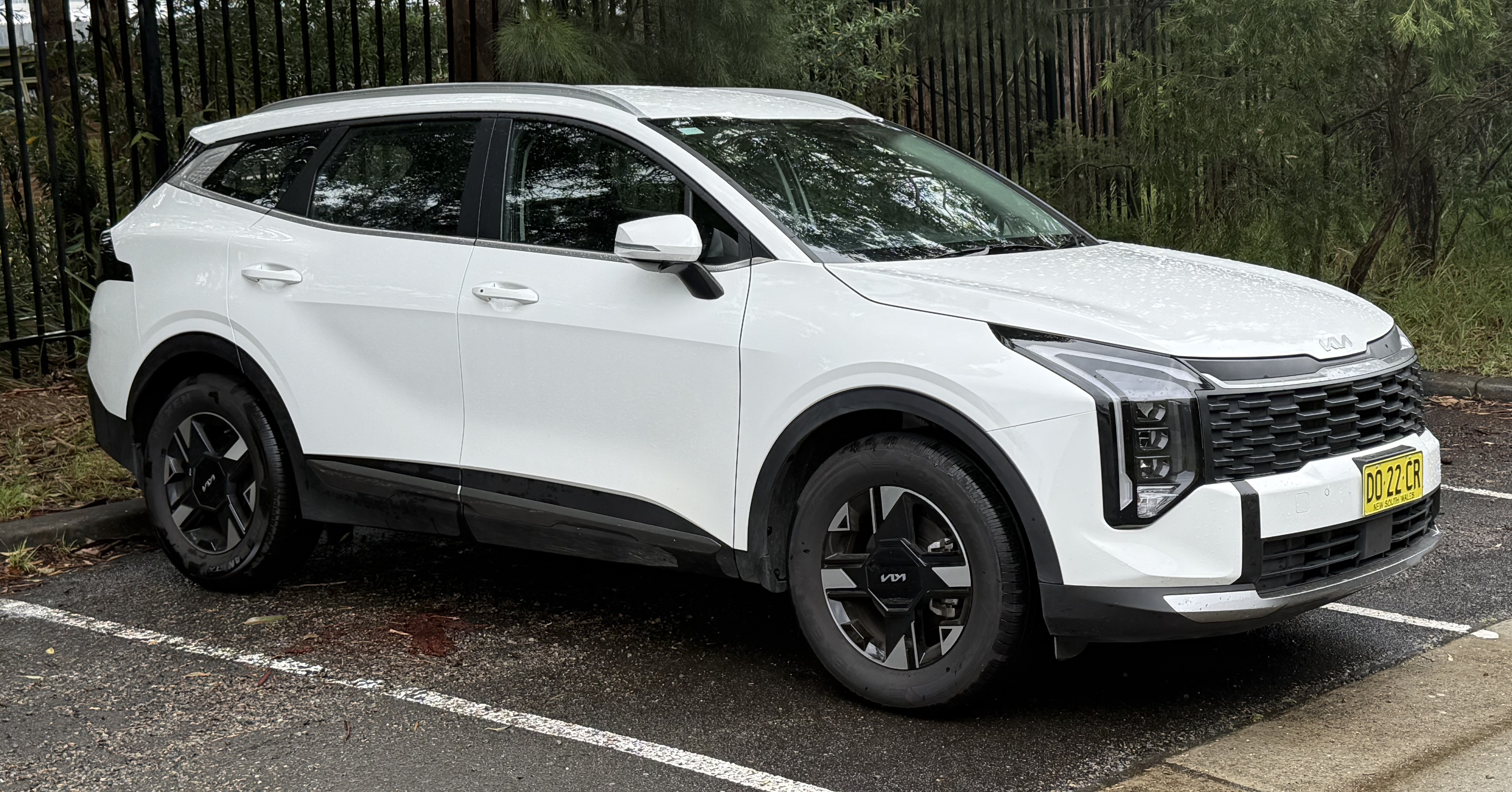

Overview
- Manufacturer: Kia
- Production: 1993–present
- Model years: 1995–present

Body and chassis
- Class: Compact SUV (1993–2004); Compact crossover SUV (C) (2004–present)
- Body style: 5-door SUV; 3-door convertible (1990–2001)
- Layout: Front-engine, rear-wheel-drive (1993–2004); Front-engine, front-wheel-drive (2004–present); Front-engine, all-wheel-drive (1993–present)
- Chassis: Body-on-frame (1993–2004); Unibody (2004–present)

Chronology
- Predecessor: Kia Retona

The Kia Sportage (Korean: 기아 스포티지) is a compact SUV manufactured by the South Korean manufacturer Kia through five generations. At its launch in 1993, the nameplate was used for a vehicle produced under a joint venture with Mazda, and shared its platform with the Mazda Bongo.

In 2004, the second-generation Sportage was released as a crossover SUV based on the unibody J platform, moving away from the body-on-frame chassis format. At the time of its release, it was originally developed and sold alongside the Hyundai Tucson and later with the Hyundai Santa Fe and the Kia Sorento, from model year 2022 onwards.

The Sportage has been the best-selling Kia model globally since 2016 after surpassing the Rio. In 2018, the model reached the 5 million production milestone. As of 2023, the Sportage is positioned between the Seltos or Niro and the three-row Sorento in Kia's global SUV lineup with the latter sharing platform with the Sportage.

== First generation (NB; 1993) ==
First generation
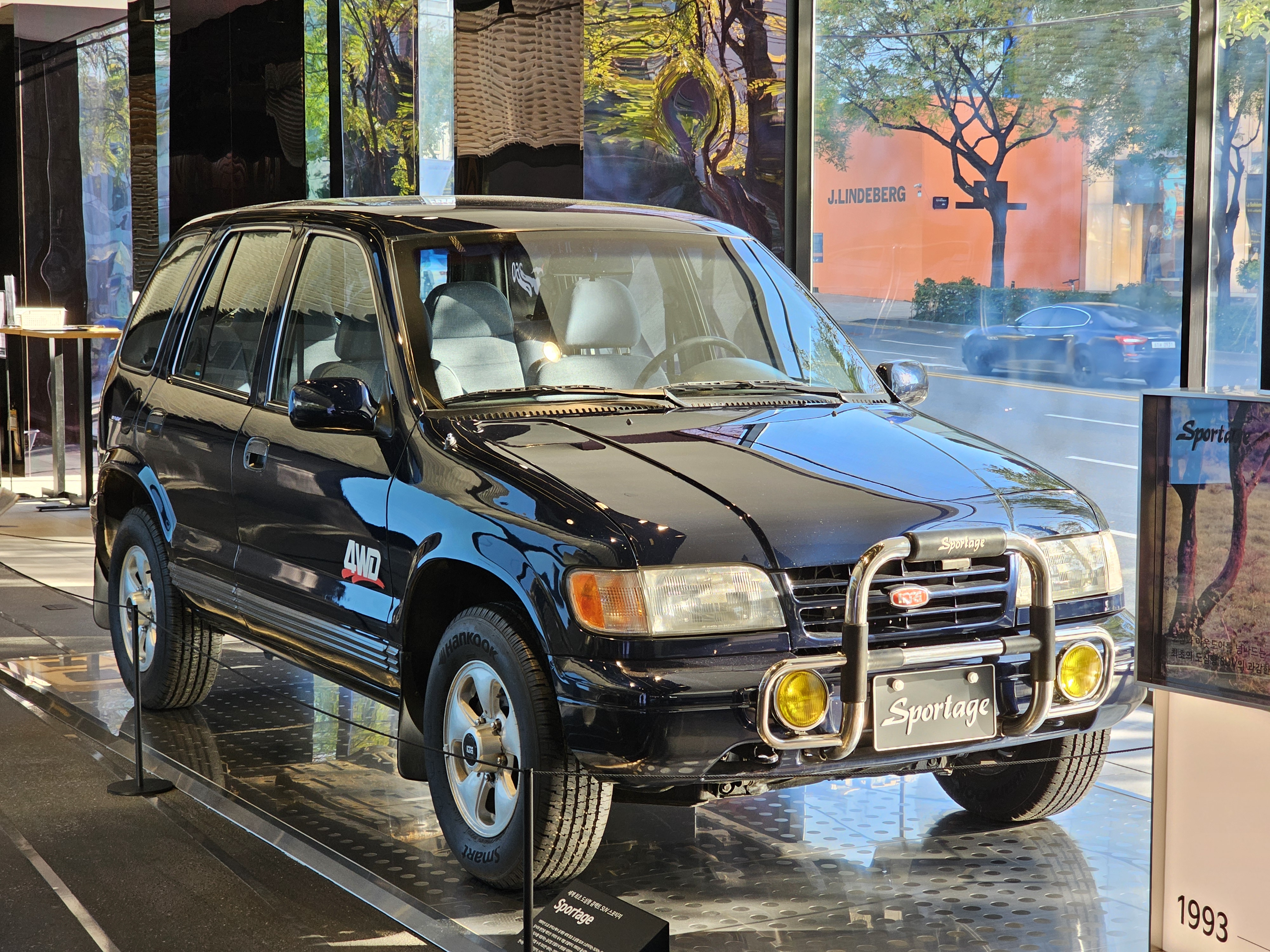
- Pre-facelift

Overview
- Model code: NB
- Also called: Wanli Sportage (China)
- Production: July 1993–2005
- Model years: 1995–2004; 1995–2002 (North America)
- Assembly: South Korea: Hwaseong (Hwaseong Plant); Germany: Osnabrück (Karmann: 1995–1998); Russia: Kaliningrad (Avtotor); Pakistan: Karachi; China: Zhanjiang, Guangdong

Body and chassis
- Body style: 5-door SUV; 3-door convertible
- Layout: Front-engine, rear-wheel drive Front-engine, four-wheel drive
- Related: Mazda Bongo

Powertrain
- Engine: Petrol: 2.0 L FE SOHC I4; 2.0 L FE DOHC I4; Diesel: 2.0 L RF turbo I4
- Transmission: 4-speed automatic 5-speed manual

Dimensions
- Wheelbase: 2,360 mm (92.9 in); 2,650 mm (104.3 in)
- Length: 4,030 mm (158.7 in) (3-door); 4,245 mm (167.1 in) (5-door); 4,440 mm (174.8 in) (Grand Wagon)
- Width: 1,855 mm (73.0 in)
- Height: 1,635 mm (64.4 in)

The first-generation Kia Sportage was developed with a Mazda Bongo engineering base platform. It shares many mechanical components such as the engine, transmissions (early versions), and differentials with the Mazda line of vehicles. This was during Kia's alliance with Ford and Mazda, which involved Ford/Mazda providing technology and Kia providing inexpensive manufacturing facilities for Ford Company.

From 1995 to 1998, the Sportage was built by Karmann in Germany; European buyers received German-built versions in that period, while the rest of the world received South Korean-built versions. It was launched in Asia in July 1993 and European sales started two years later.

The Sportage was sold in either a five-door SUV or a three-door soft-top convertible. Kia initially developed the wagon in standard length form, but in circa 1996, the company released an extended length version. This stretched model—mainly sold in Asian markets under the name "Sportage Grand", but also as the "Grand Wagon"—featured a 305 mm (12.0 in) longer body utilizing the same wheelbase, an increase in luggage capacity from 1,570 to 2,220 liters (55.4 to 78.4 cu ft), and the relocation of the spare wheel from the tailgate to underneath the floor.

Kia offered three Mazda-sourced engines in the Sportage, beginning with the 2.0-litre FE DOHC inline-four petrol unit producing 95 kW (128 hp) and the 2.0-litre RF inline-four diesel rated at 61 kW (82 hp). Diesel-engined models were mostly restricted to European markets, as was the more basic single overhead camshaft (SOHC) version of the 2.0-litre FE petrol inline-four. Delivering 87 kW (117 hp), this petrol engine was available from 2000 onwards. In North America, the 2.0-litre FE DOHC engine produced 130 hp (97 kW) and had optional four-wheel drive. The 1997 model year Kia Sportage was the world's first production vehicle to be equipped with a knee airbag.

This first-generation model (1993–2002) sold in low numbers, even domestically in South Korea, and models after Hyundai's 1998 partial takeover of Kia (1997–2002) were recalled twice for rear wheels dismounting while driving. The first-generation Sportage was discontinued in South Korea in 2002, and in North America after the 2002 model year. By 2003, most international markets had discontinued the Sportage range, although it remained on sale in some developing countries until its second-generation replacement arrived in 2005.

The Kia Sportage scored the lowest possible result in the Australian ANCAP crash tests – one star out of five. As well as a failure of the seat belts, the vehicle structure collapsed.

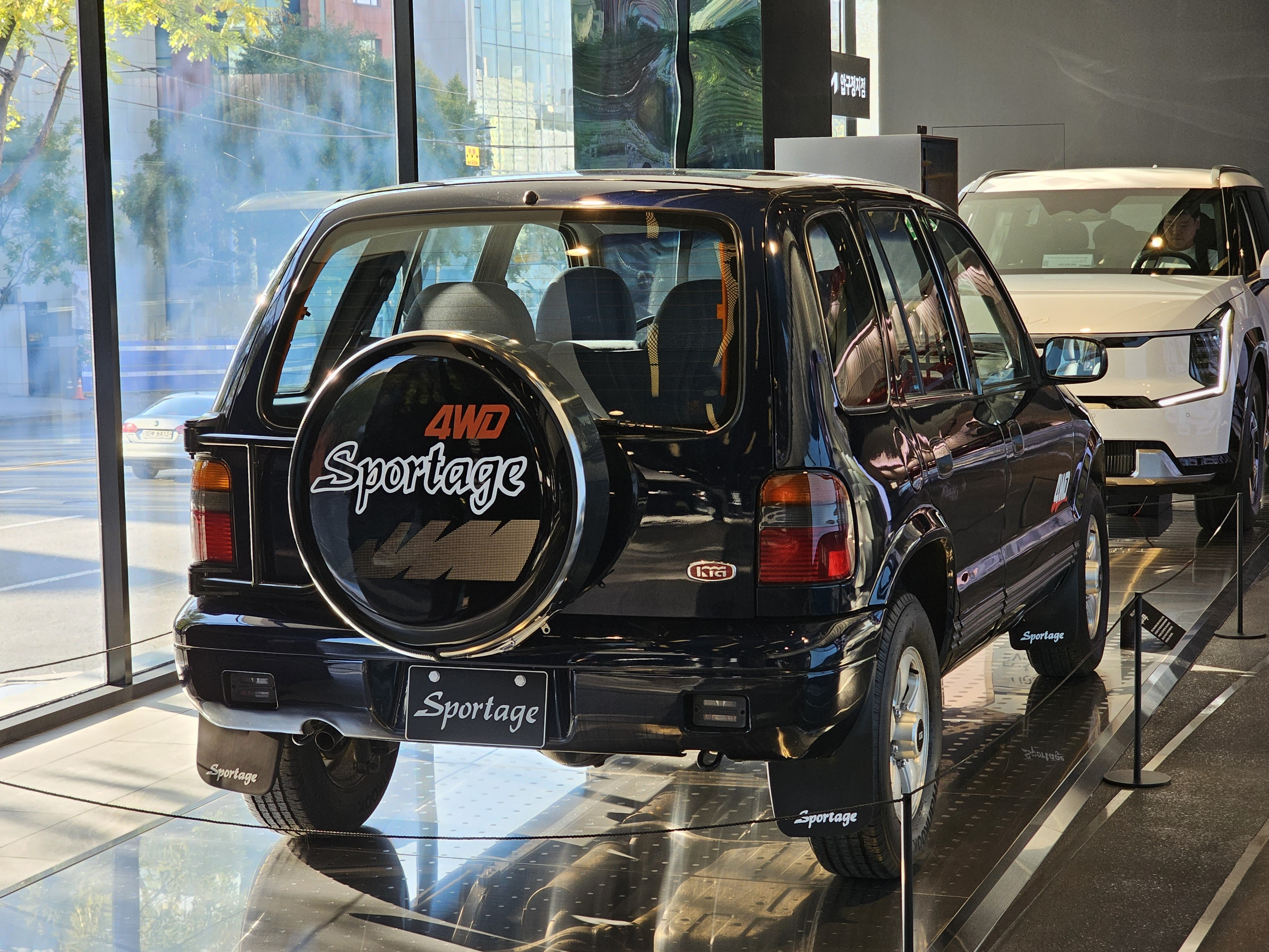
Rear view (standard 5-door)

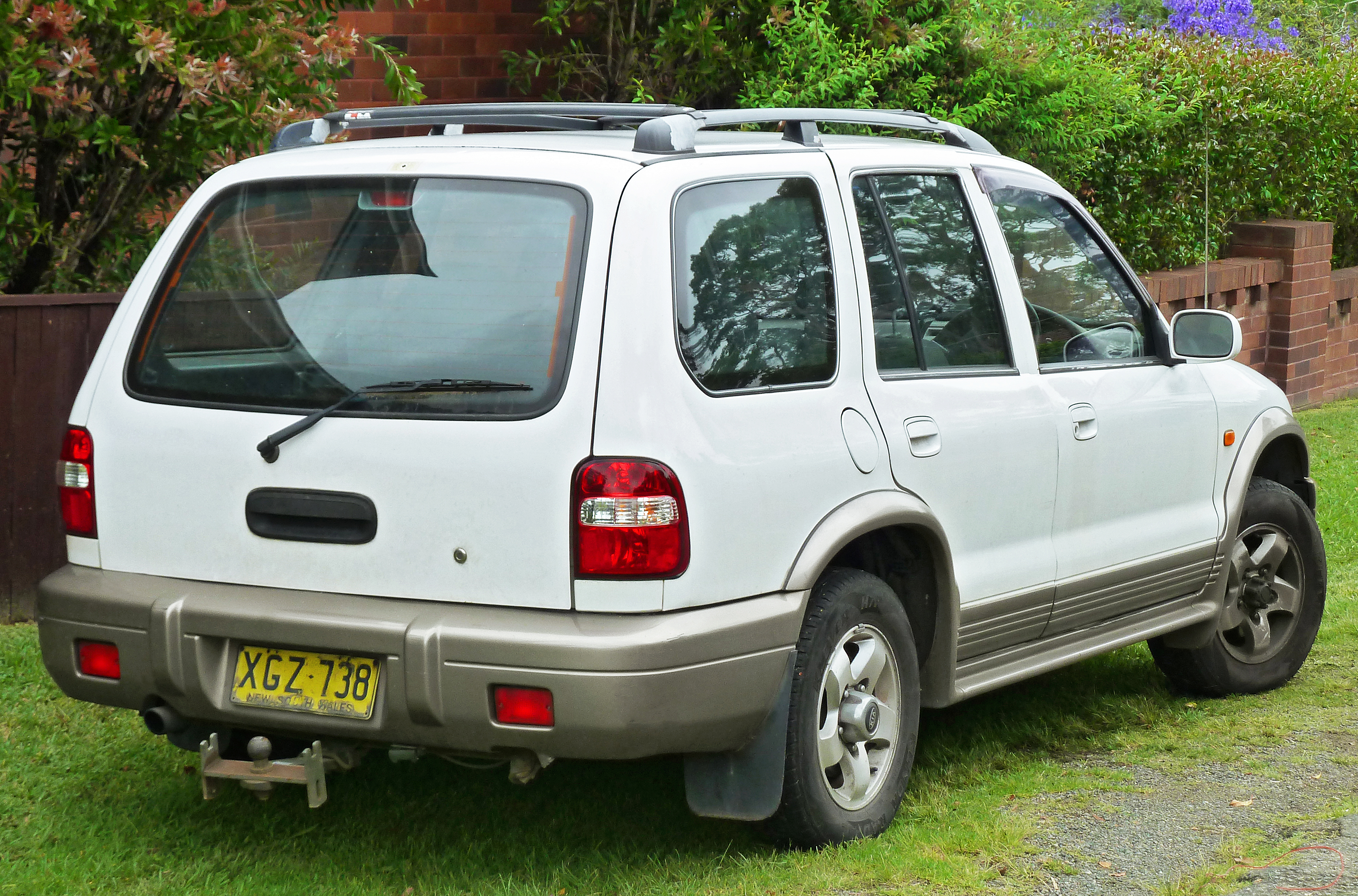
Rear view (Grand Wagon)

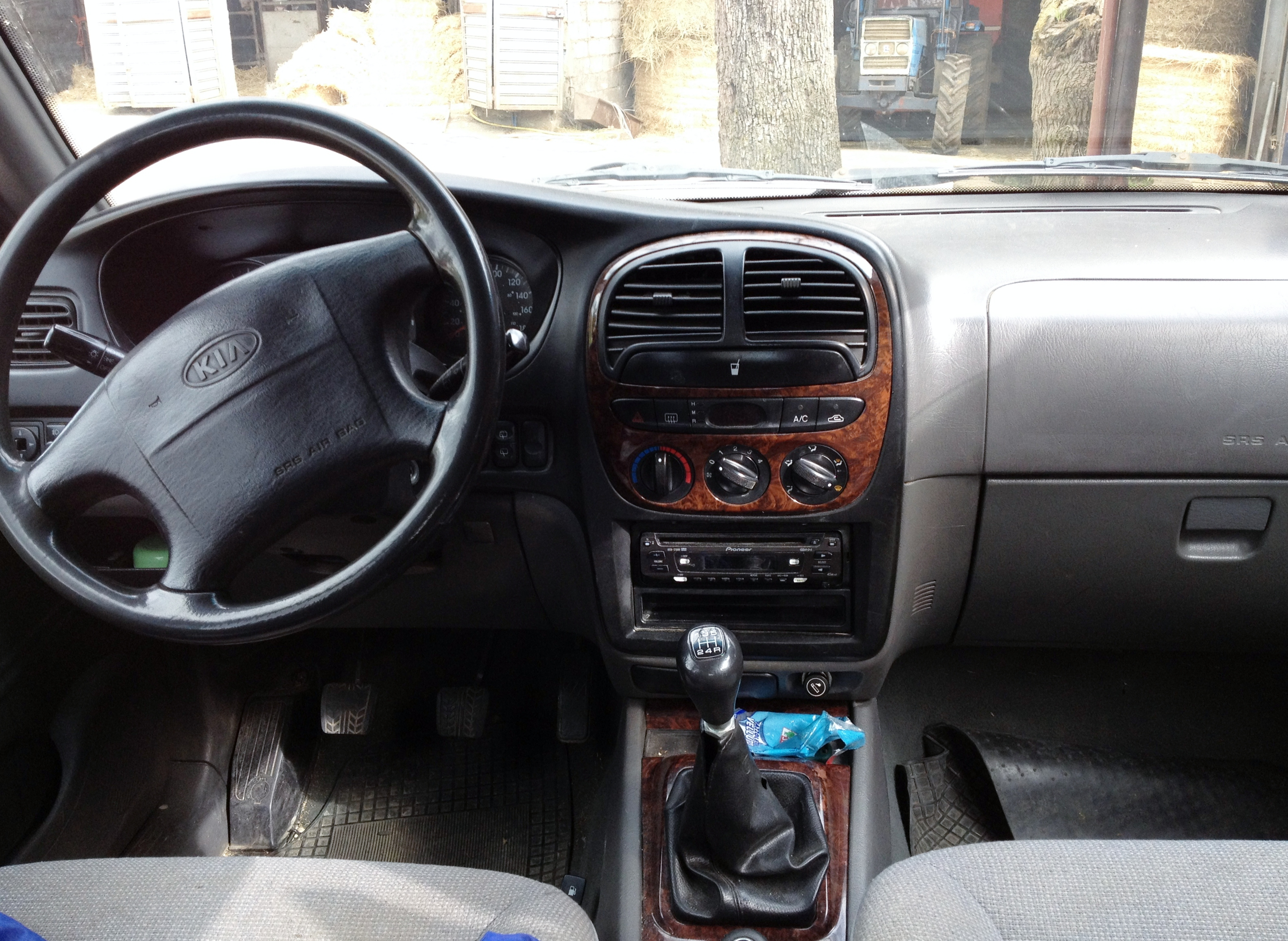
Interior

=== Facelift ===
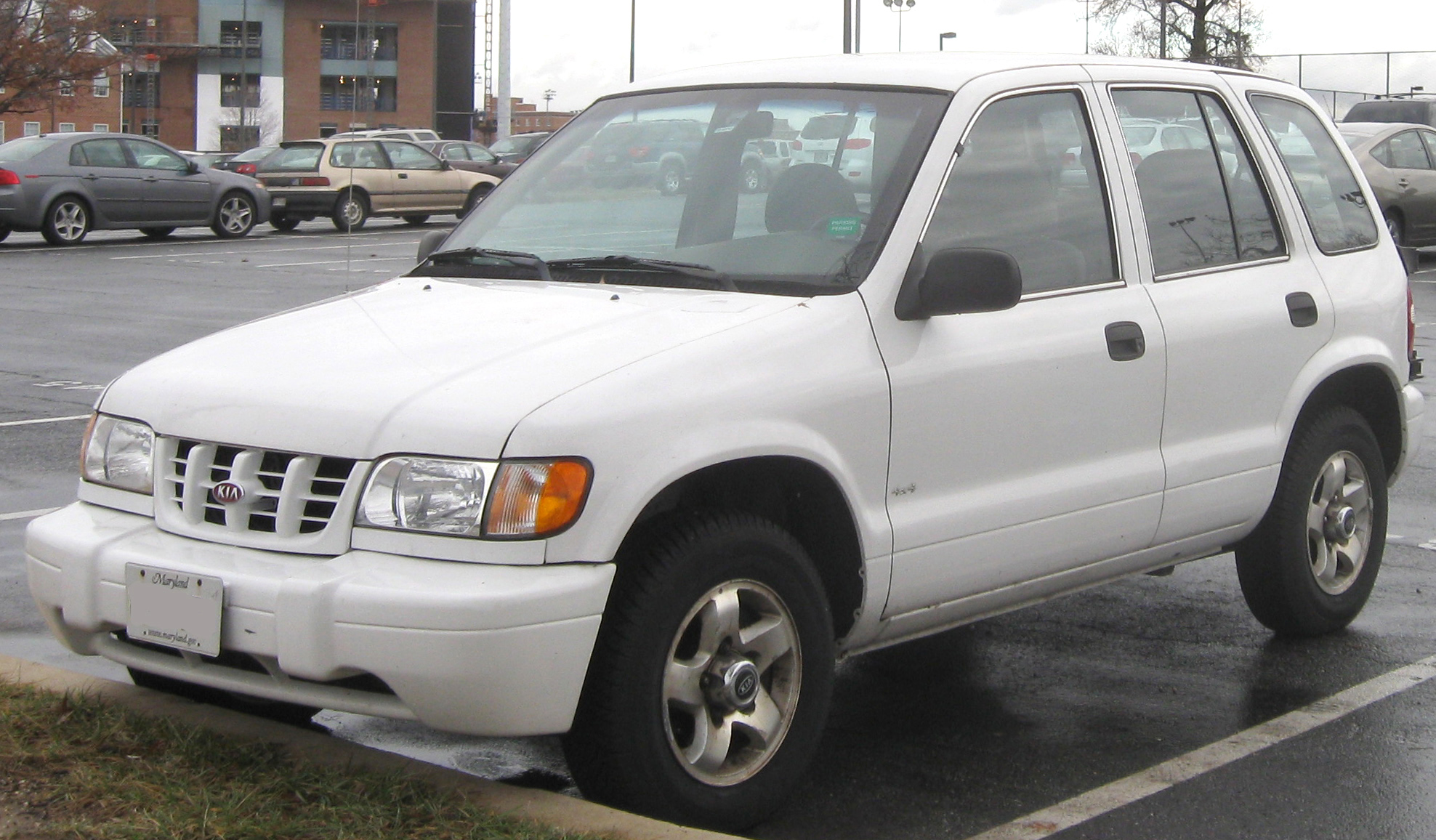
1998–2001 Kia Sportage

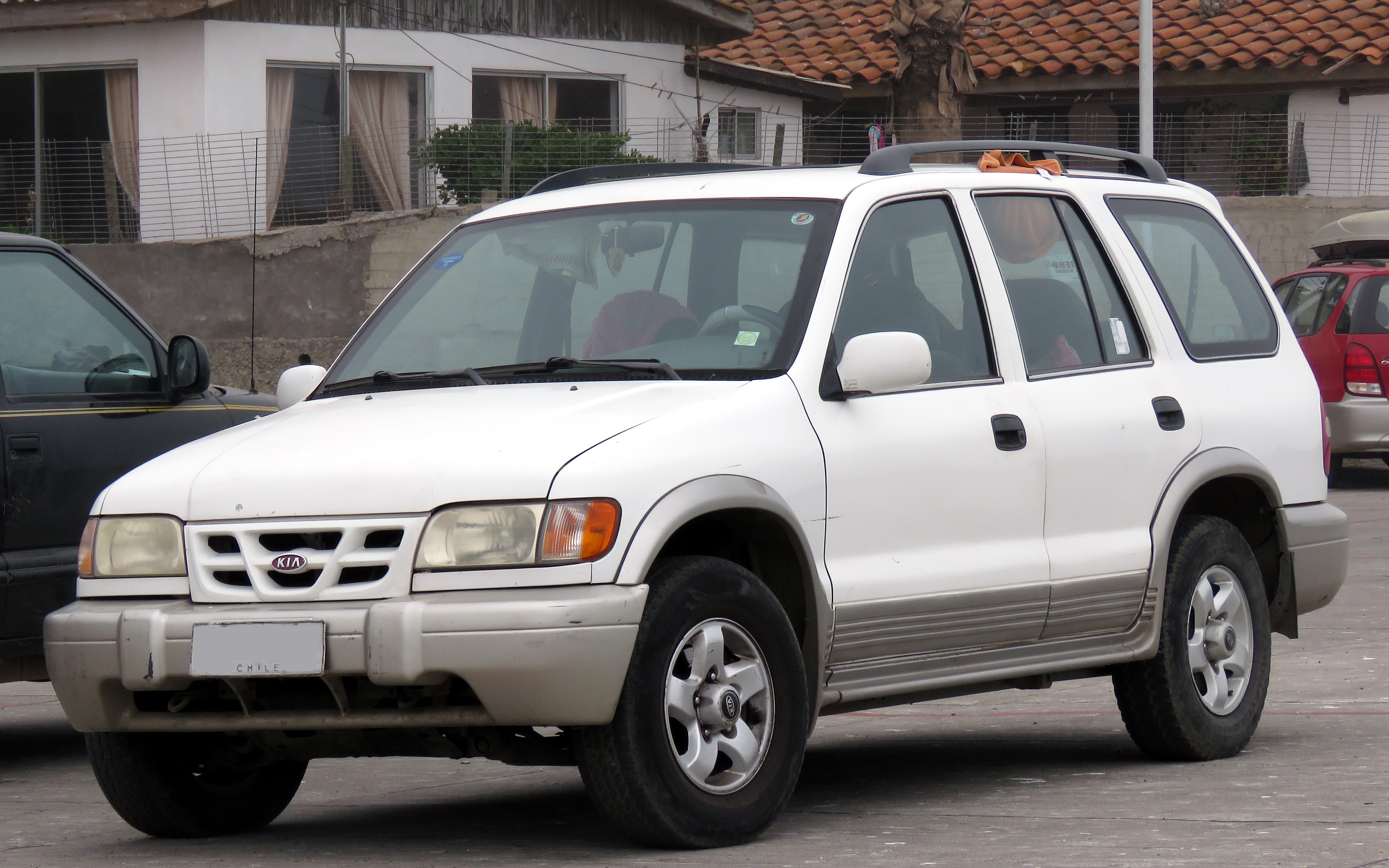
1998–2002 Kia Grand Sportage

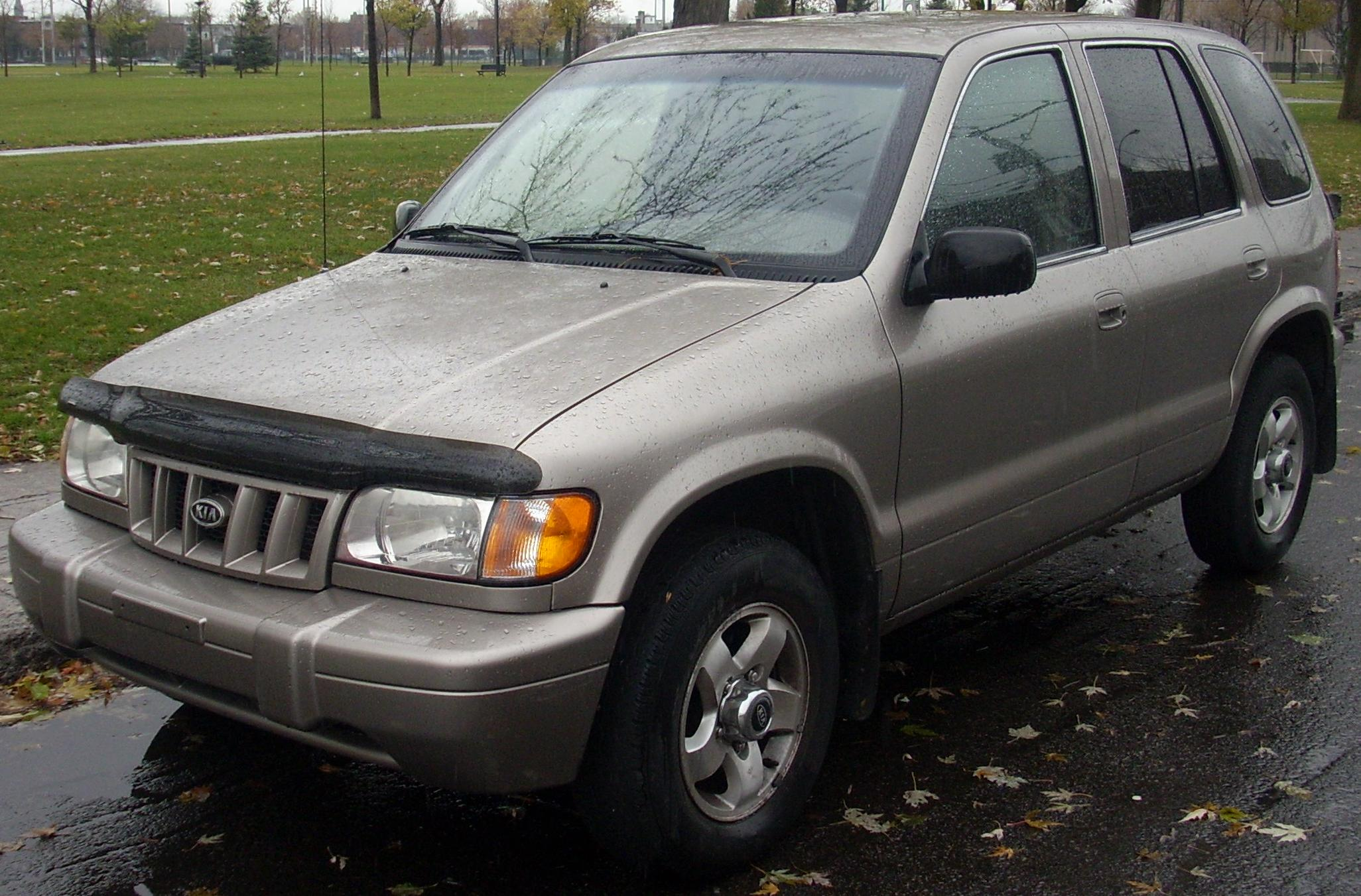
2002–2005 Kia Sportage

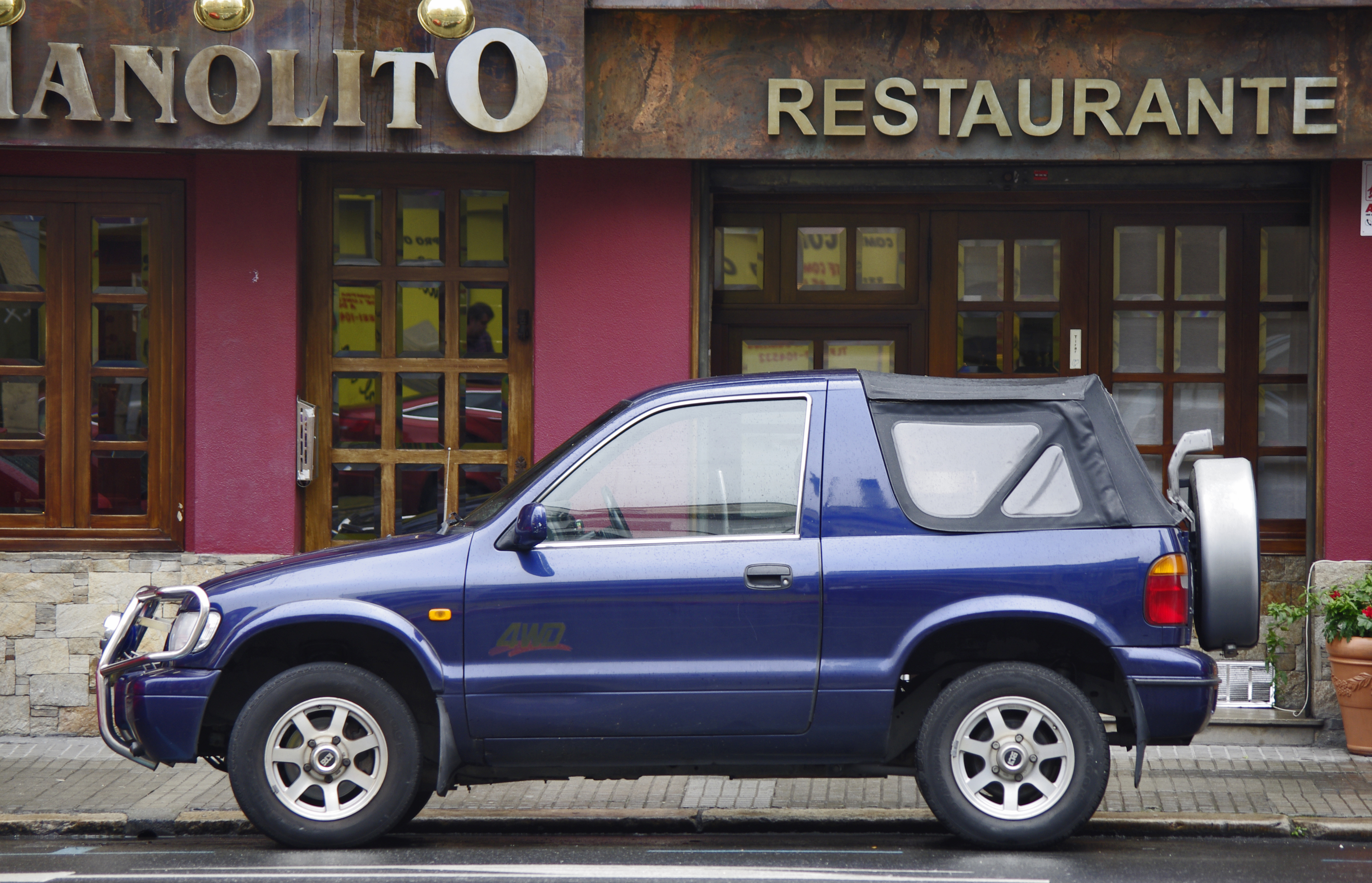
Kia Sportage soft-top

==== Engines ====
| Model name | Power | Capacity | Fuel | Year of construction |
|---|---|---|---|---|
| 2.0 TD 4WD (RF) | 83 HP | 1,998 cc | Diesel | 1997–2003 |
| 2.0 (FE 8V) | 95 HP | 1,998 cc | Petrol | 1994–1995 |
| 2.0 4WD | 118 HP | 1,998 cc | Petrol | 2000–2003 |
| 2.0 ( FED ) | 128–140 HP | 1,998 cc | Petrol | 1994–2006 |
| 2.2 D 4WD | 63 HP | 2,184 cc | Diesel | 1994–1998 |
| 2.2 D 4WD | 71 HP | 2,184 cc | Diesel | 1994–1999 |

== Second generation (JE/KM; 2004) ==
Second generation
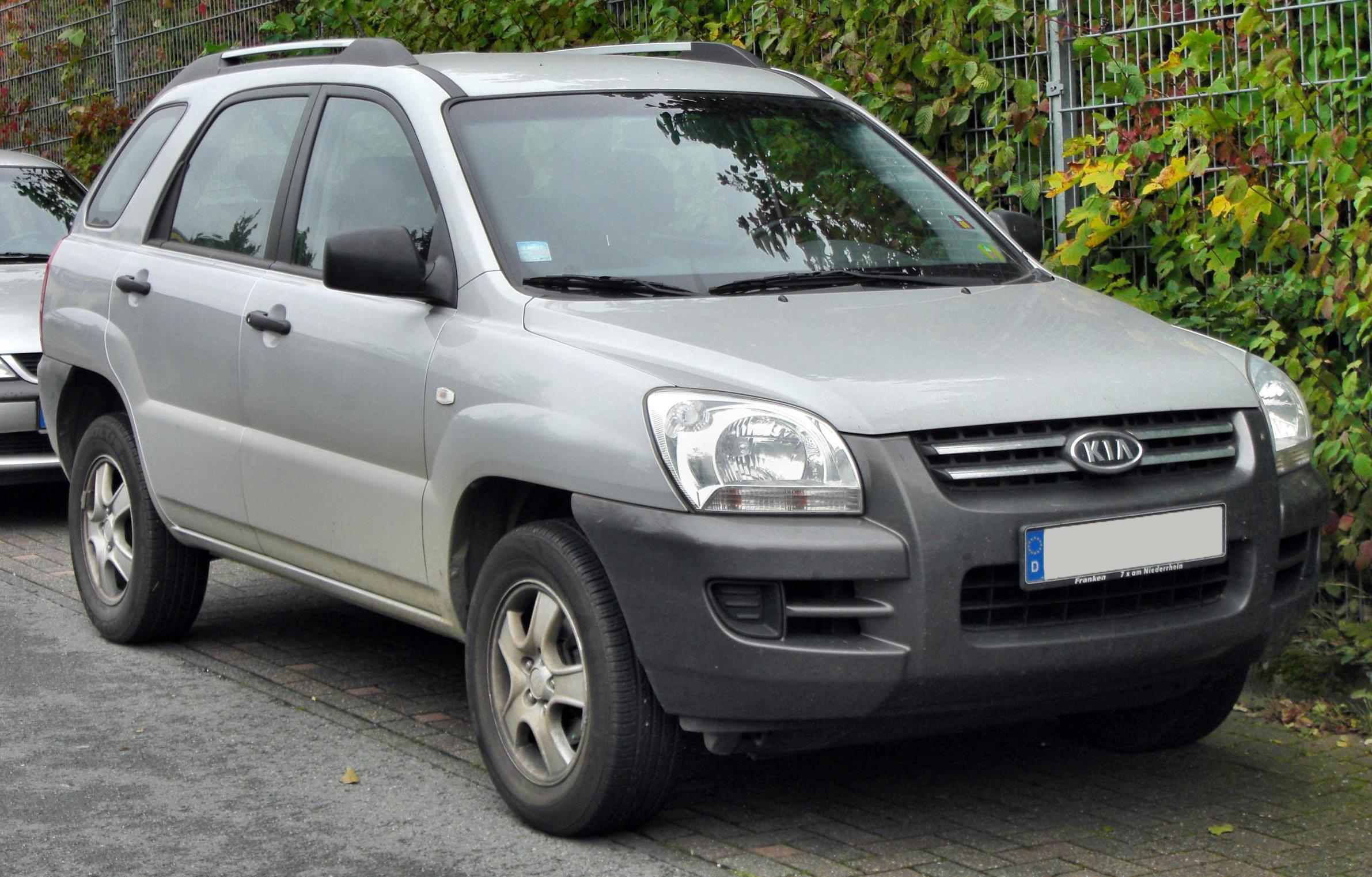
- Pre-facelift

Overview
- Model code: JE/KM
- Production: 2004 – February 2010
- Model years: 2005–2010; 2006–2015 (China)
- Assembly: South Korea: Gwangju (Gwangju Plant); Slovakia: Žilina (Kia Motors Slovakia); China: Yancheng (DYK); Malaysia: Gurun (NAM); Russia: Kaliningrad (Avtotor); Ukraine: Zaporizhzhia (AvtoZAZ); Ecuador: Quito (AYMESA)

Body and chassis
- Layout: Front-engine, front-wheel-drive Front-engine, all-wheel drive
- Related: Hyundai Tucson (JM)

Powertrain
- Engine: Petrol: 2.0 L Beta II CVVT I4; 2.7 L Delta V6; Diesel: 2.0 L D CRDi-VGT I4
- Transmission: 5/6-speed manual 4-speed automatic

Dimensions
- Wheelbase: 2,630 mm (103.5 in)
- Length: 4,350 millimetres (171.3 in)
- Width: 1,820–1,840 mm (71.7–72.4 in)
- Height: 1,695–1,730 mm (66.7–68.1 in)
- Curb weight: 1,480–1,685 kg (3,263–3,715 lb)

After a two-year hiatus, the Sportage returned in model-year 2005, sharing a Hyundai Elantra-based platform with the first-generation Hyundai Tucson. A 2.0 L straight-4 diesel engine was available in the United Kingdom. Fans of the original pre-Hyundai Sportage and critics complained that it was considerably larger than the original Sportage and had none of its off-road capability, the two keys to its success. However, buyers of the second-generation model were likely to favor the available 173 PS (127 kW) V6, with 241 N⋅m (178 lb⋅ft). Overall fit/finish and quality was noticeably improved over the first-generation model.

A facelift model of the second generation was introduced in May 2008. From 2006, it was manufactured at the Žilina Plant in Slovakia. A second facelift was introduced in the UK in early 2009, only a few months after its first facelift.

The Sportage was named as one of the most reliable vehicles from the 2009 Consumer Reports reliability survey. and ranked second in the "20 least expensive 2009 vehicles to insure" list by Insure.com.

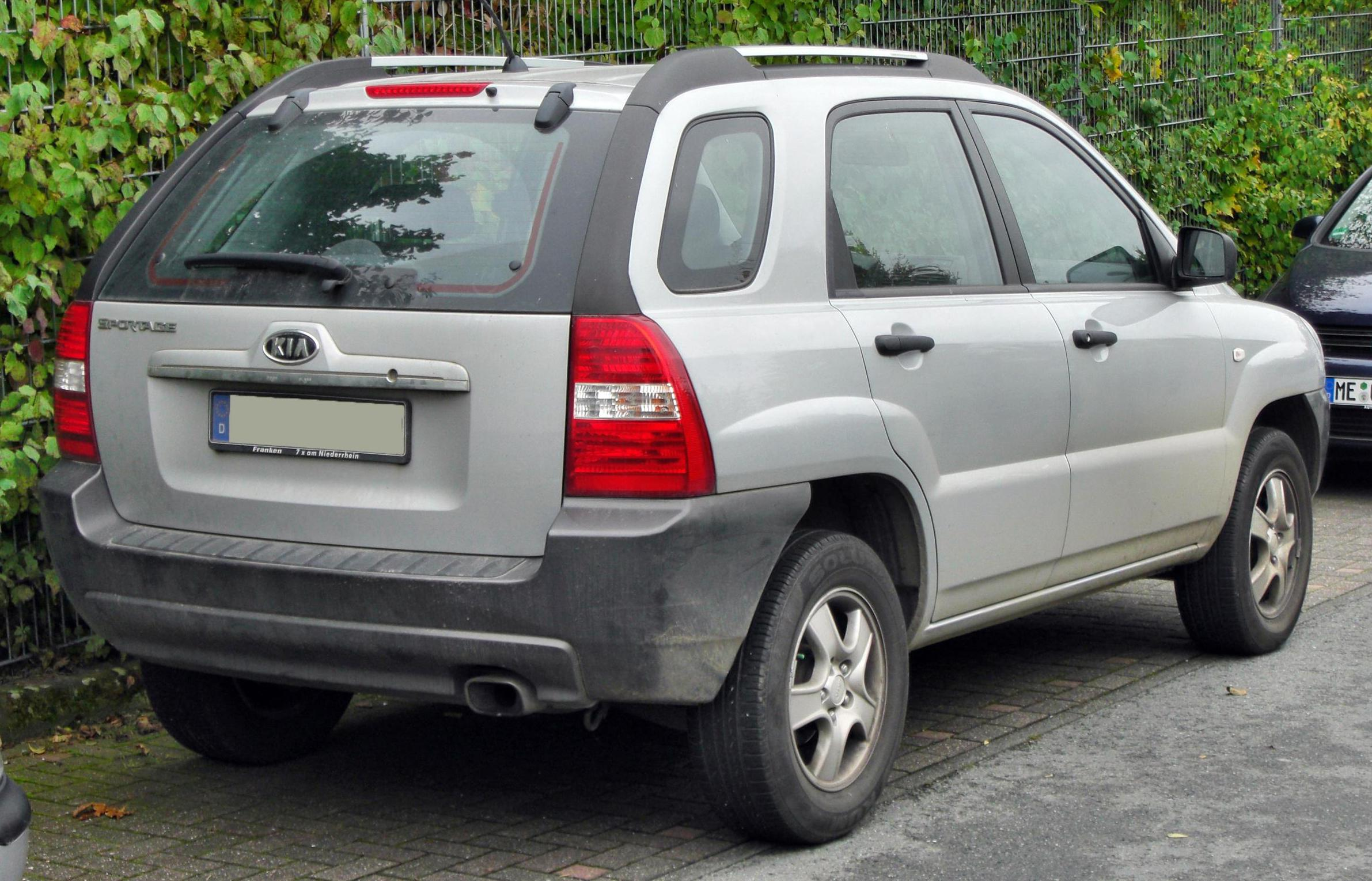
Rear view

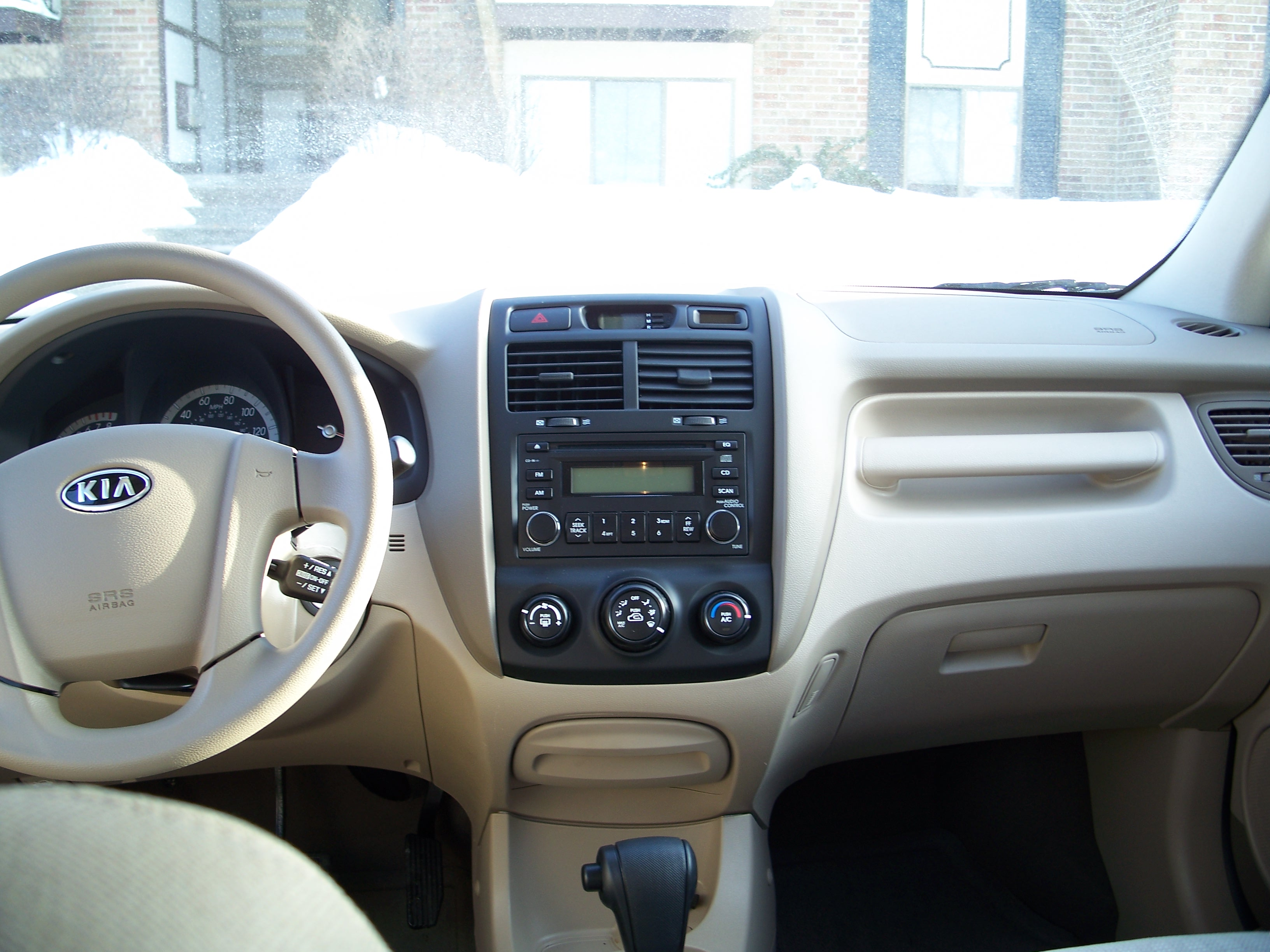
Interior

=== First facelift ===
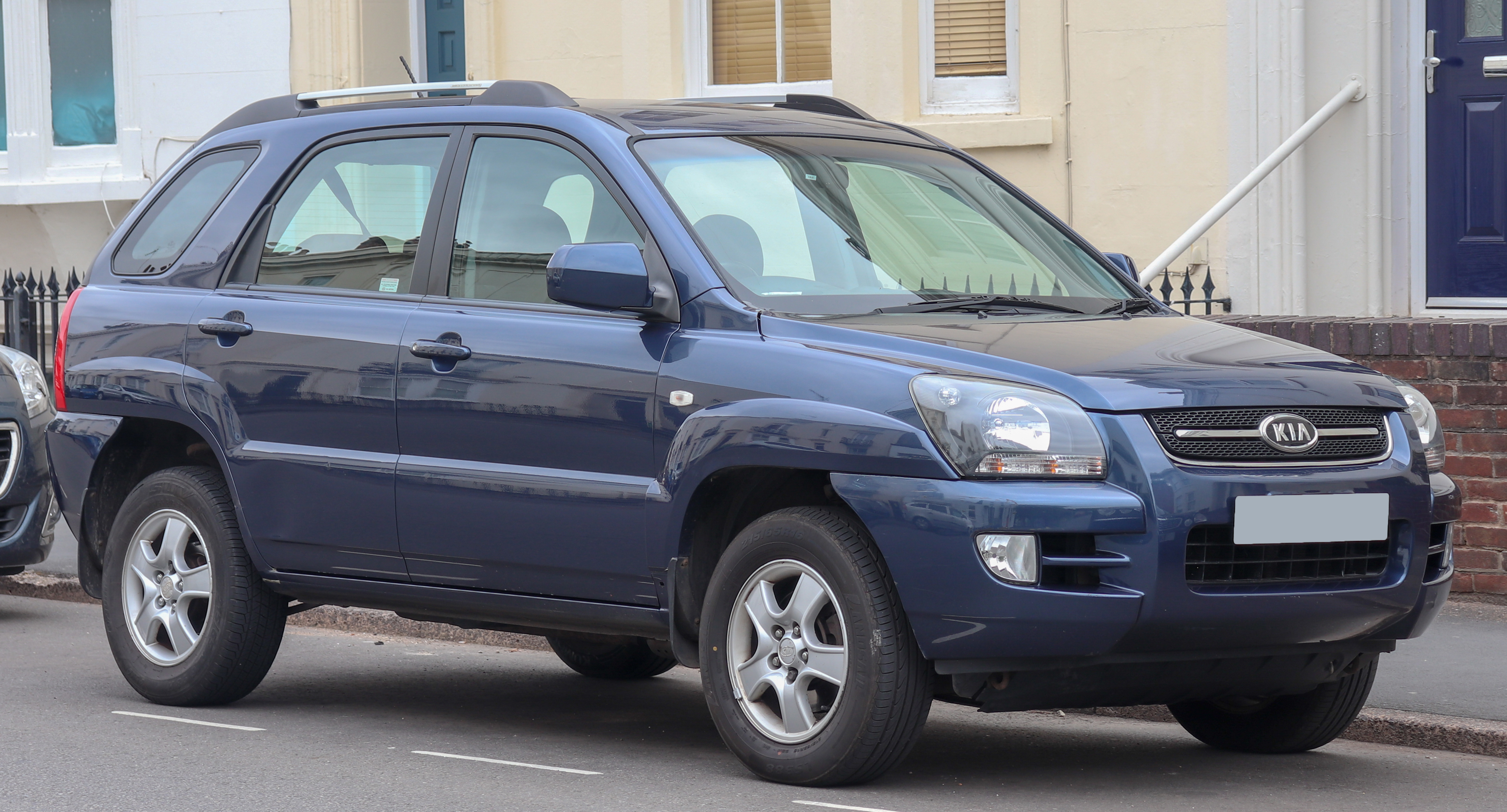
First facelift (front; UK)

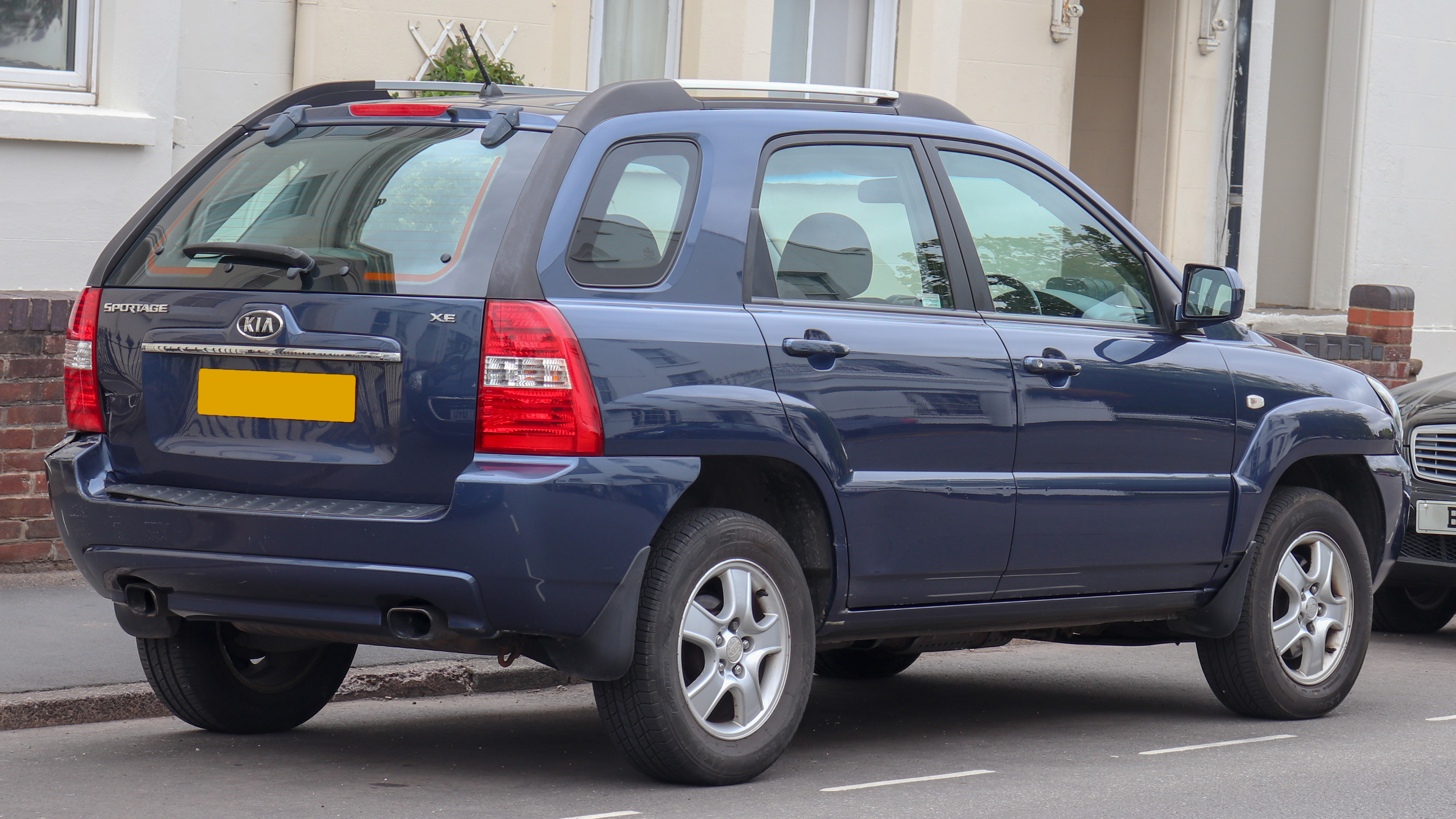
First facelift (rear; UK)

=== Second facelift ===
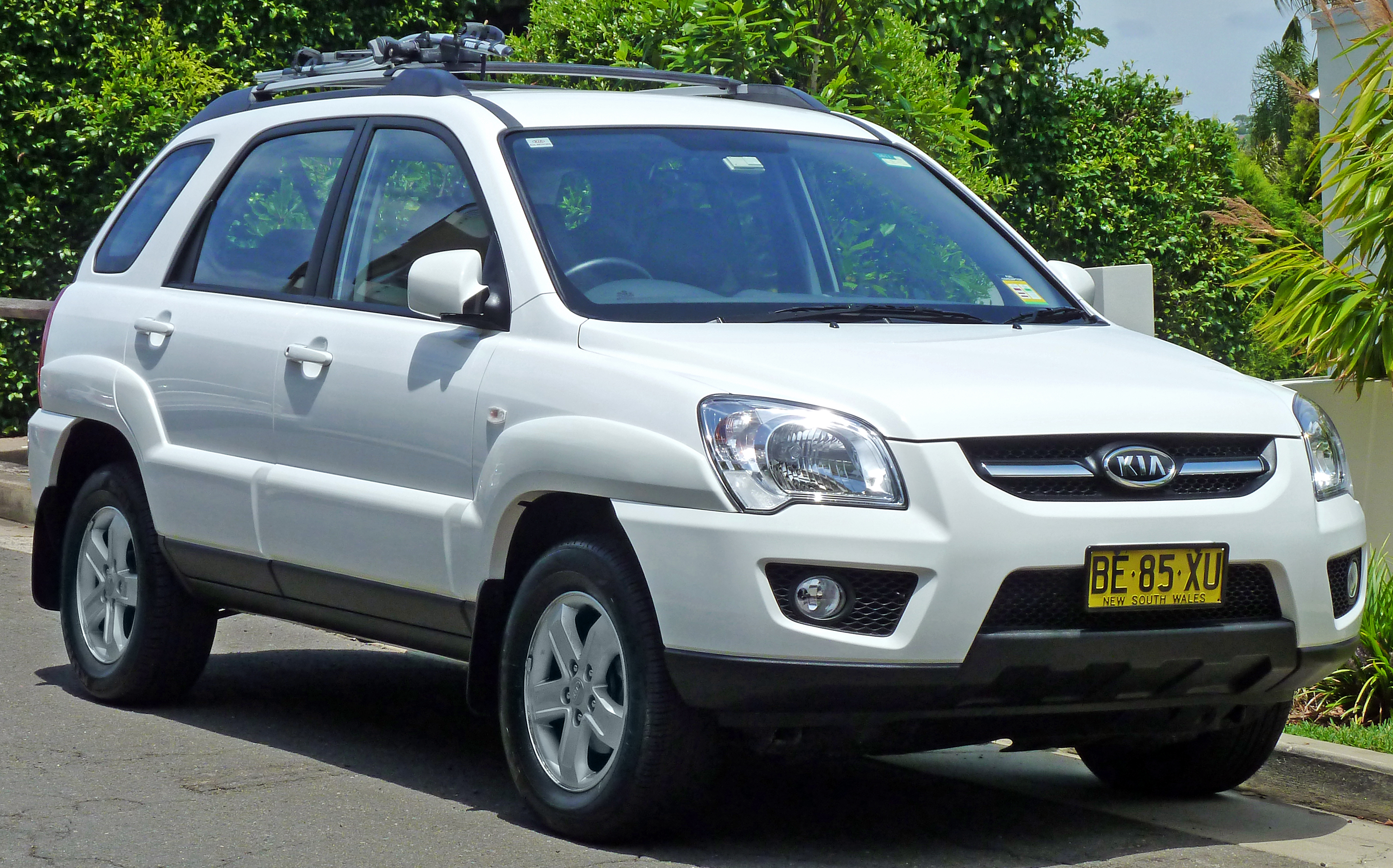
Second facelift (front; Australia)

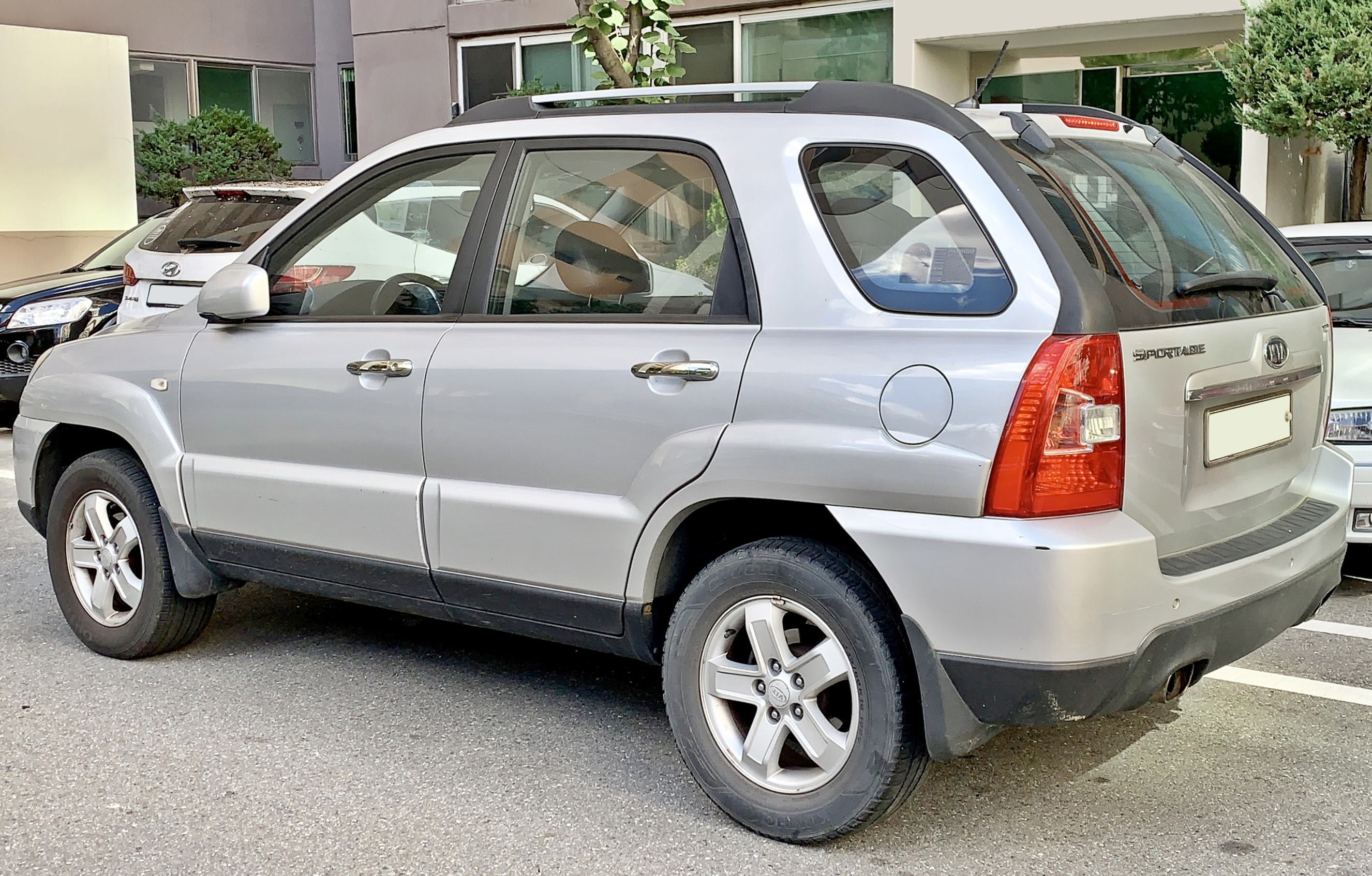
Second facelift (rear; South Korea)

=== Safety ===
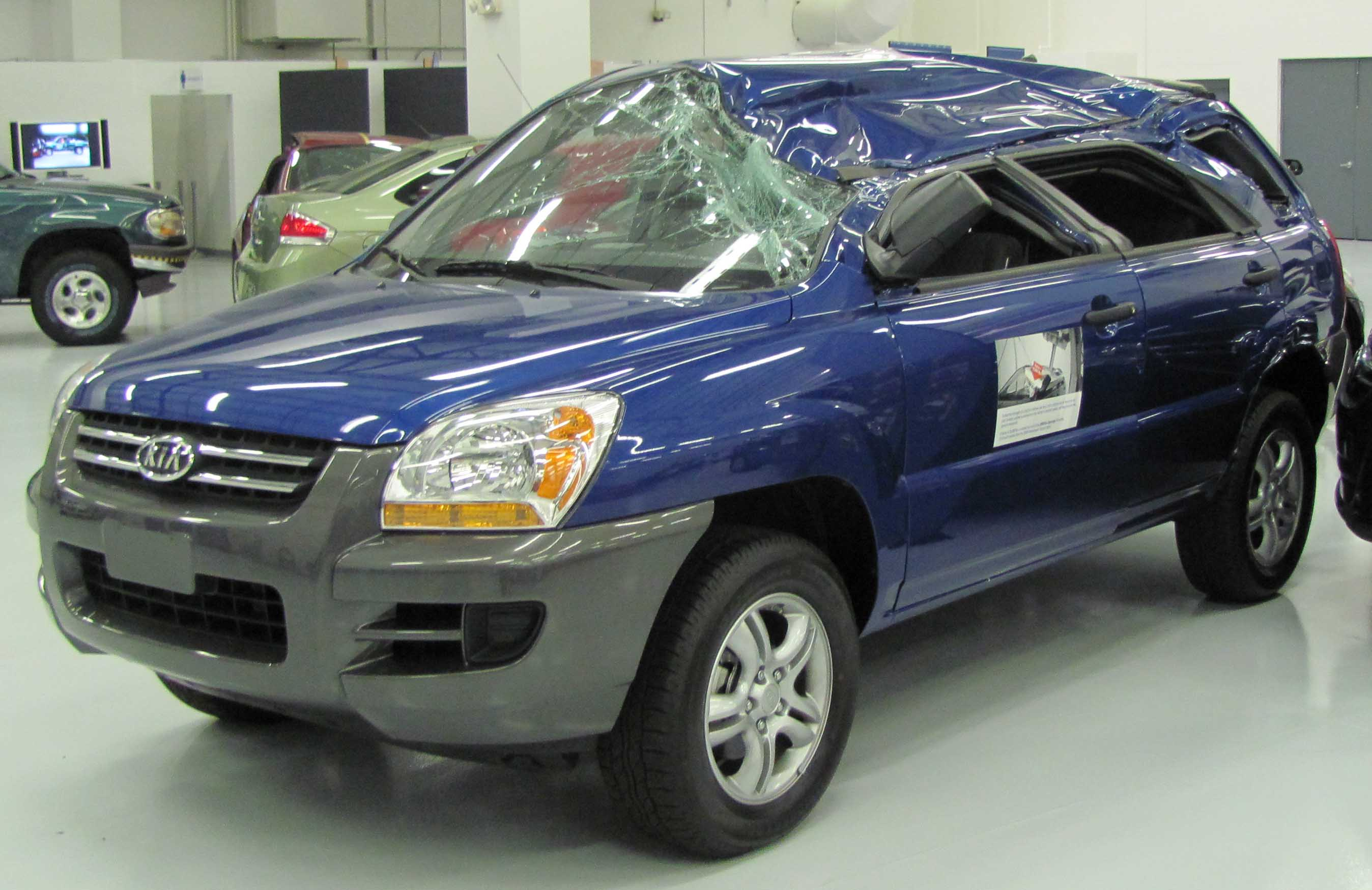
The Insurance Institute for Highway Safety displays a 2008 Sportage as an example of a weak roof.

The second-generation Sportage earned a top rating of five stars in crash tests by the National Highway Traffic Safety Administration. However, the Insurance Institute for Highway Safety (IIHS) rated it only “acceptable” for frontal and side impact crash protection and “poor” for roof strength.

IIHS scores
| Test | Rating |
| Overall: | 2/5 stars |
| Moderate overlap front | Acceptable |
| Side | Acceptable |
| Roof strength | Poor |
| Head restraints and seats | Poor |

==== Engines ====
| Model name | Power | Capacity | Fuel | Year of construction |
|---|---|---|---|---|
| 2.0 ( G4GC ) | 141 HP | 1,975 cc | Petrol | 2004–2010 |
| 2.7 ( G6BA ) | 175 HP | 2,656 cc | Petrol | 2004–2010 |
| 2.0 ( D4EA ) | 113 HP | 1,991 cc | Diesel | 2005–2010 |
| 2.0 CRDi | 150 HP | 1,991 cc | Diesel | 2008–2010 |
| 2.0 CRDi 4WD | 140 HP | 1,991 cc | Diesel | 2006–2010 |

== Third generation (SL; 2010) ==
Third generation
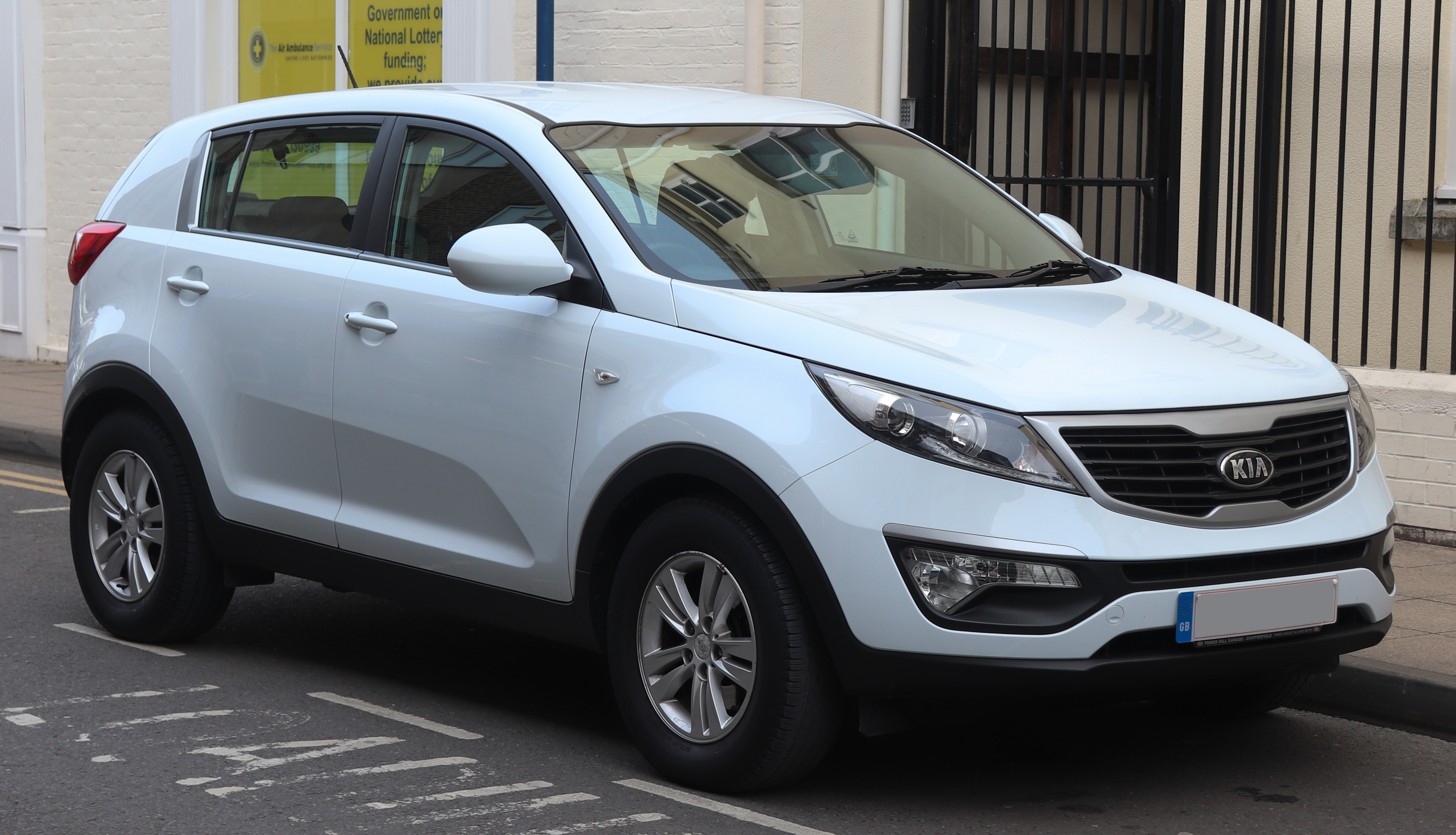
- Pre-facelift

Overview
- Model code: SL
- Production: March 2010 – August 2015; 2010–2018 (China)
- Model years: 2011–2016
- Assembly: South Korea: Gwangju (Gwangju Plant); Slovakia: Žilina (Kia Motors Slovakia); China: Yancheng (DYK); Malaysia: Gurun (NAM); Russia: Kaliningrad (Avtotor)
- Designer: Peter Schreyer

Body and chassis
- Layout: Front-engine, front-wheel-drive Front-engine, all-wheel drive
- Related: Hyundai Tucson (LM)

Powertrain
- Engine: Petrol: 1.6 L Gamma GDi I4; 2.0 L Theta II MPi I4; 2.0 L Theta II T-GDi I4; 2.4 L Theta II MPi I4; 2.4 L Theta II GDi I4; Diesel: 1.7 L U CRDi-VGT I4; 2.0 L R CRDi-VGT I4
- Transmission: 5/6-speed manual; 6-speed automatic

Dimensions
- Wheelbase: 2,640 mm (103.9 in)
- Length: 4,440–4,450 mm (174.8–175.2 in)
- Width: 1,855 mm (73.0 in)
- Height: 1,635–1,645 mm (64.4–64.8 in)
- Curb weight: 1,410–1,625 kg (3,109–3,583 lb)

The SL series Sportage was released to Asian and European markets in April 2010, the North and Central American markets in August 2010, and the Australian market in October 2010, for the 2011 model year. Two engines were available, a 2.0-litre Hyundai R diesel engine with 184 hp (137 kW), and a 2.0-litre Theta T-GDi petrol engine. In China, it was released by Dongfeng Yueda Kia in October 2010 and called the Sportage R, and was to be built and marketed alongside the previous generation rather than as a replacement for it.

The Sportage won the 2011 Car of the Year (originally "Auto roku 2011 na Slovensku") in Slovakia and "Truck of the Year" nomination of International Car of the Year. It was top of the JD Power Survey for 2012, the only car in the survey to score five stars across all categories, from mechanical reliability to ownership costs and the dealer experience. In South Africa, it took the 2013 Standard Bank People's Wheels Award for "SUVs and Crossovers – City & Suburban".

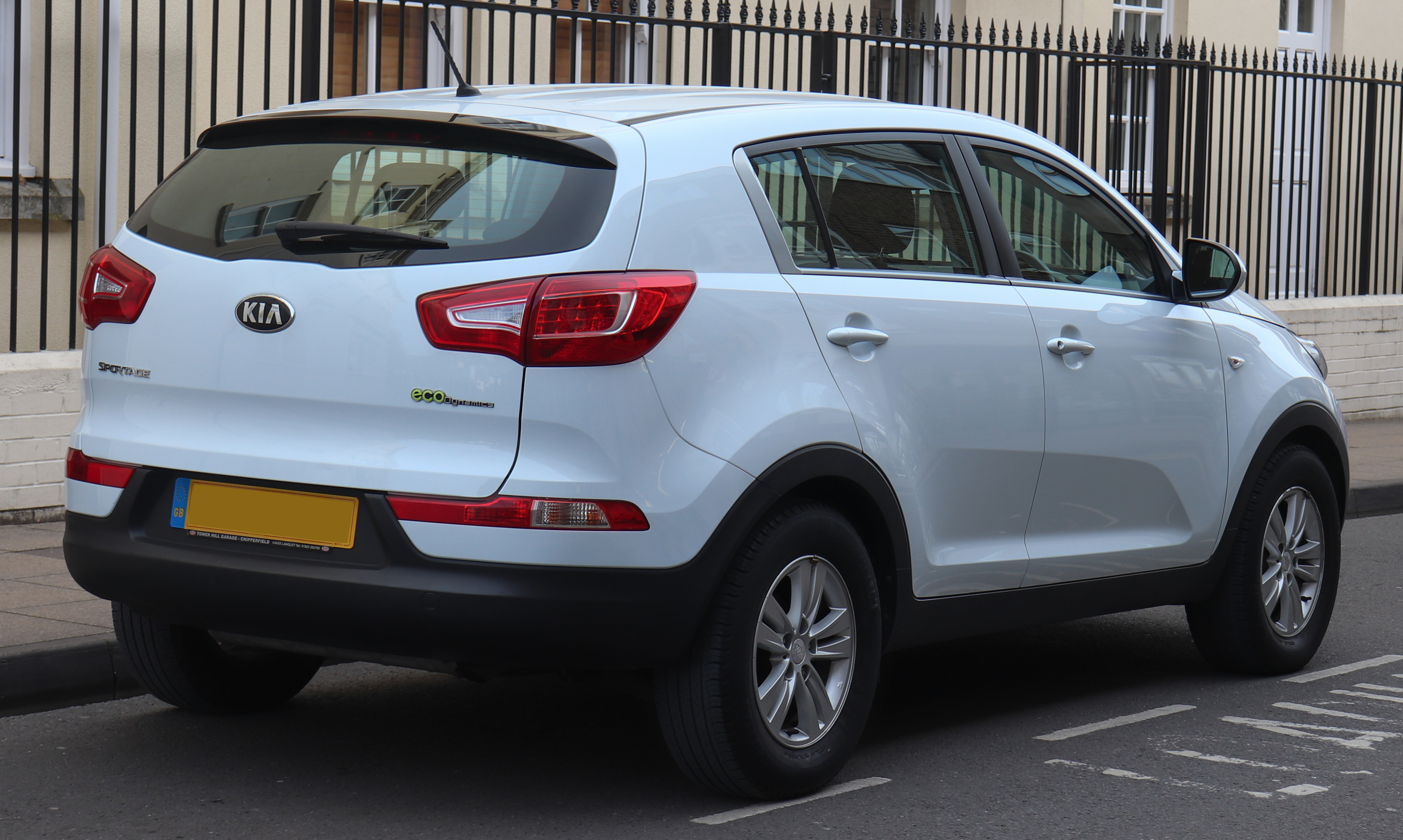
Rear view

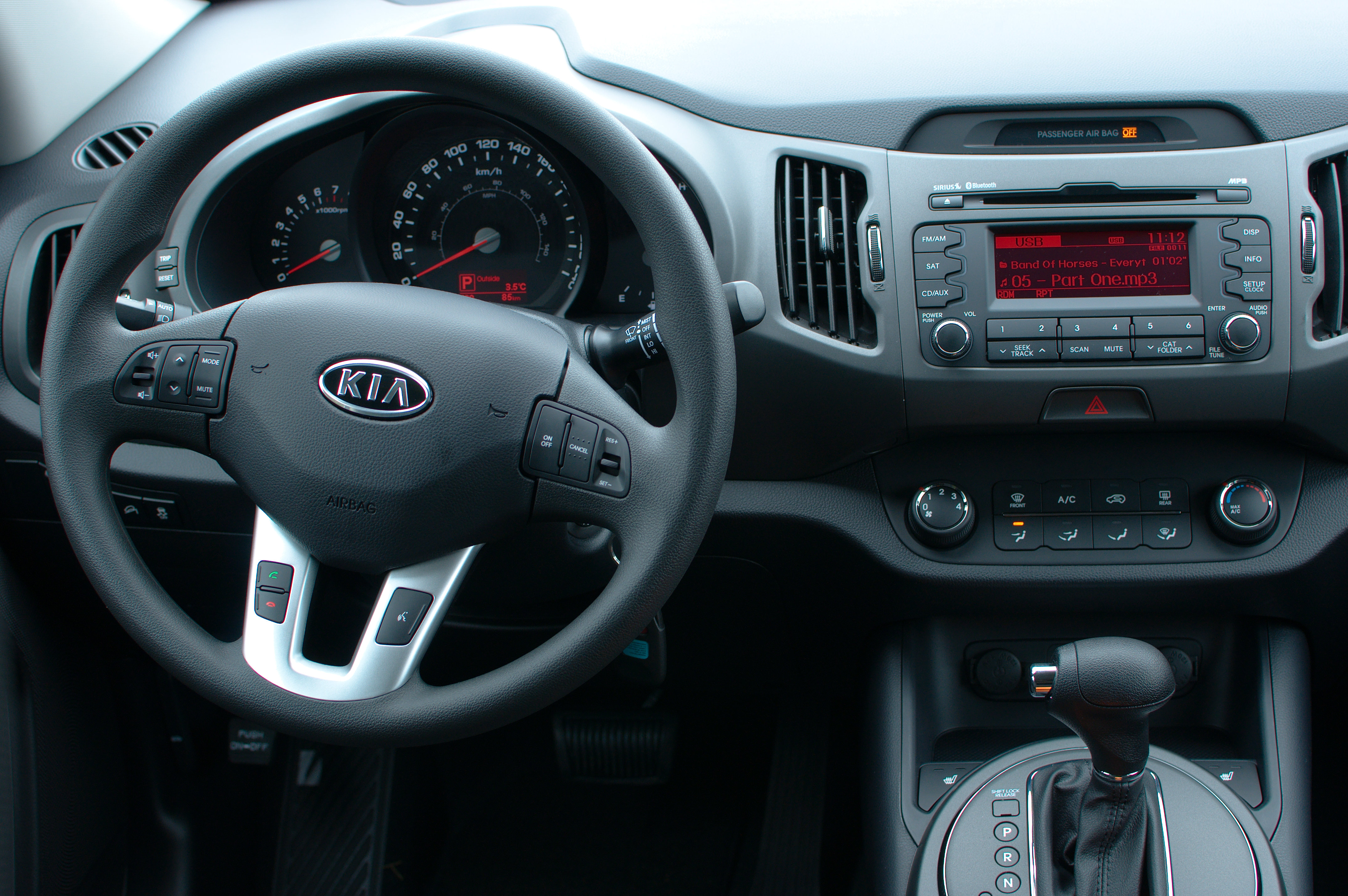
Interior

=== Facelift ===
The third generation received a facelift for the 2014 model year that included a new grille with a redesigned Kia logo, LED tail lights and redesigned alloy wheels.

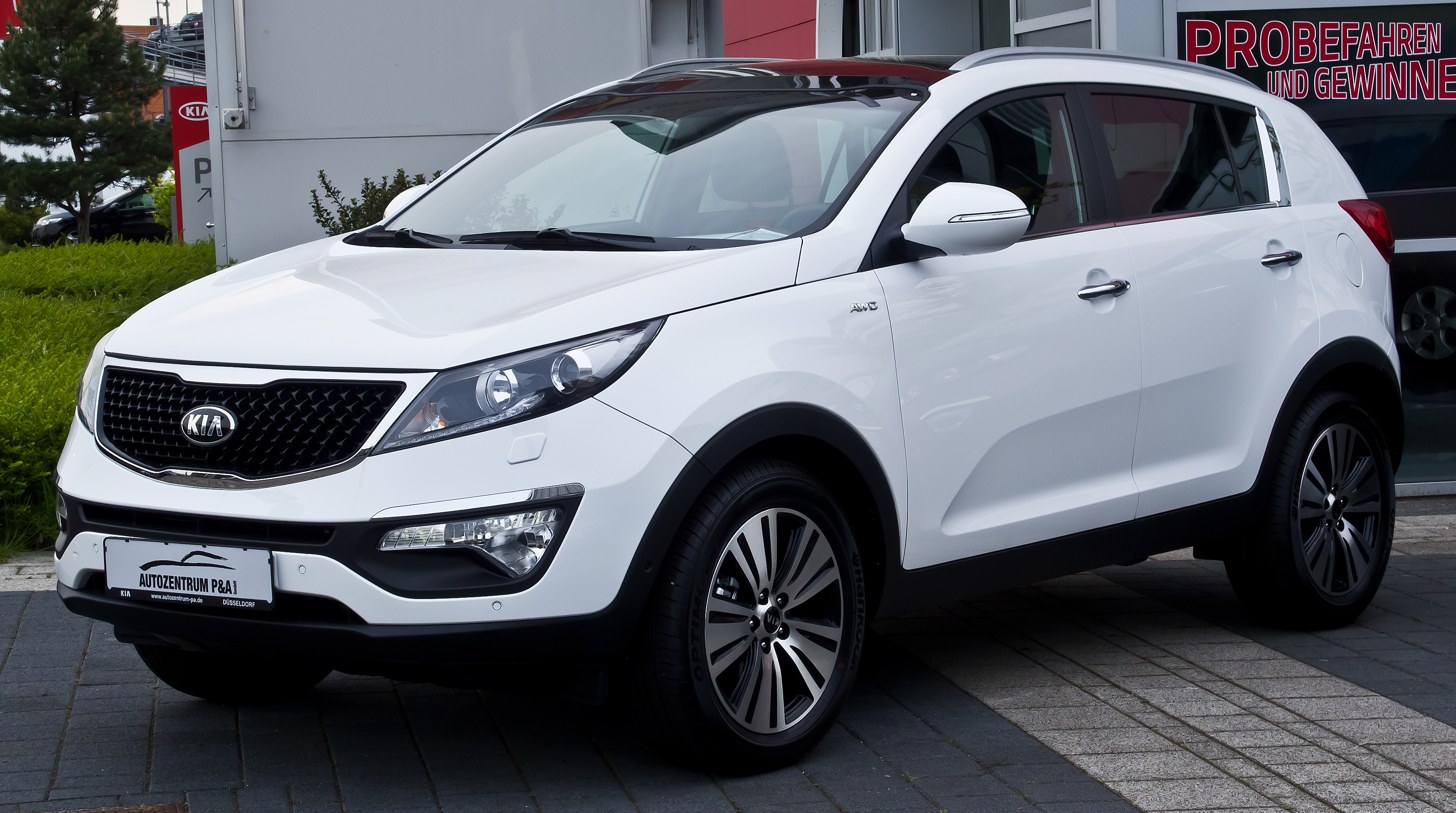
Facelift

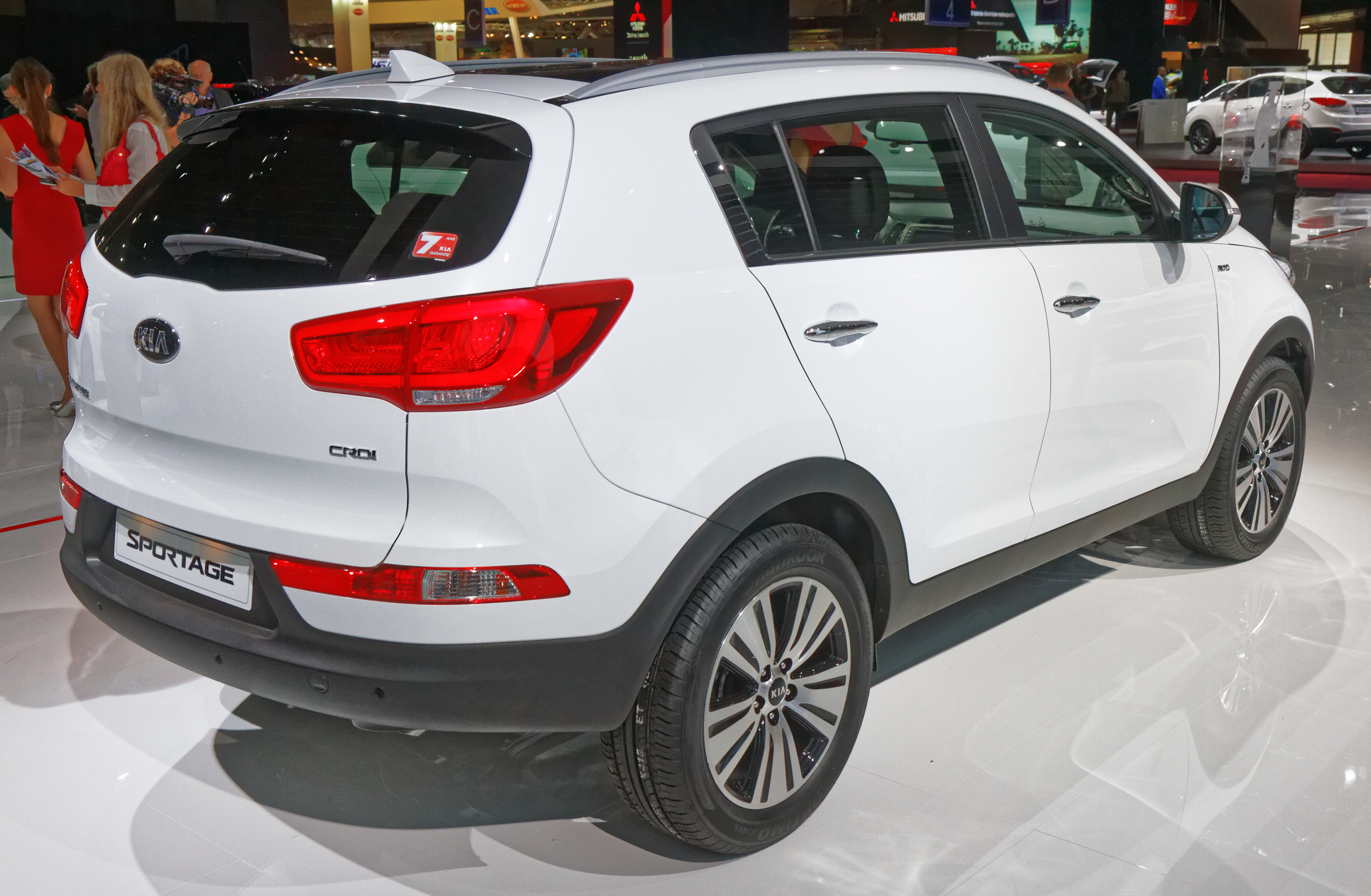
Facelift

=== Safety ===
==== Euro NCAP ====
The Sportage in its standard European market configuration received 5 stars from Euro NCAP in 2010.

==== IIHS ====
The third-generation Sportage received a "Top Safety Pick" rating from the Insurance Institute for Highway Safety in the United States. Earning the award became tougher in 2010 when IIHS added the rollover crash test, which measures roof strength and is twice as stringent as the federal requirement. To pass this test, a vehicle's roof must be able to withstand the force of three times the vehicle's weight (acceptable rating). The federal standard requires a roof to hold 1.5 times the vehicle's weight.

IIHS scores
| Test | Rating |
| Overall | 5/5 stars |
| Small overlap front (Driver) | Poor |
| Moderate overlap front | Good |
| Side | Good |
| Roof strength | Good |
| Head restraints and seats | Good |

==== ANCAP ====
ANCAP test results Kia Sportage all variants (2011)
| Test | Score |
|---|---|
| Overall | 5 /5 stars |
| Frontal offset | 15.10/16 |
| Side impact | 16/16 |
| Pole | 2/2 |
| Seat belt reminders | 2/3 |
| Whiplash protection | Good |
| Pedestrian protection | Marginal |
| Electronic stability control | Standard |

=== Engines ===
| Model name | Power | Capacity | Fuel | Year of construction |
|---|---|---|---|---|
| 1.6 ( G4FD ) | 135 HP | 1,591 cc | Petrol | 2011–present |
| 2.0 ( G4KD ) | 163 HP | 1,998 cc | Petrol | 2010–present |
| 2.0 ( G4NC ) | 166 HP | 1,998 cc | Petrol | 2014–present |
| 2.4 ( G4KE ) | 177 HP | 2,359 cc | Petrol | 2010–present |
| 2.0 ( D4HA ) | 136–184 HP | 1,995 cc | Diesel | 2010–present |

== Fourth generation (QL; 2015) ==
Fourth generation
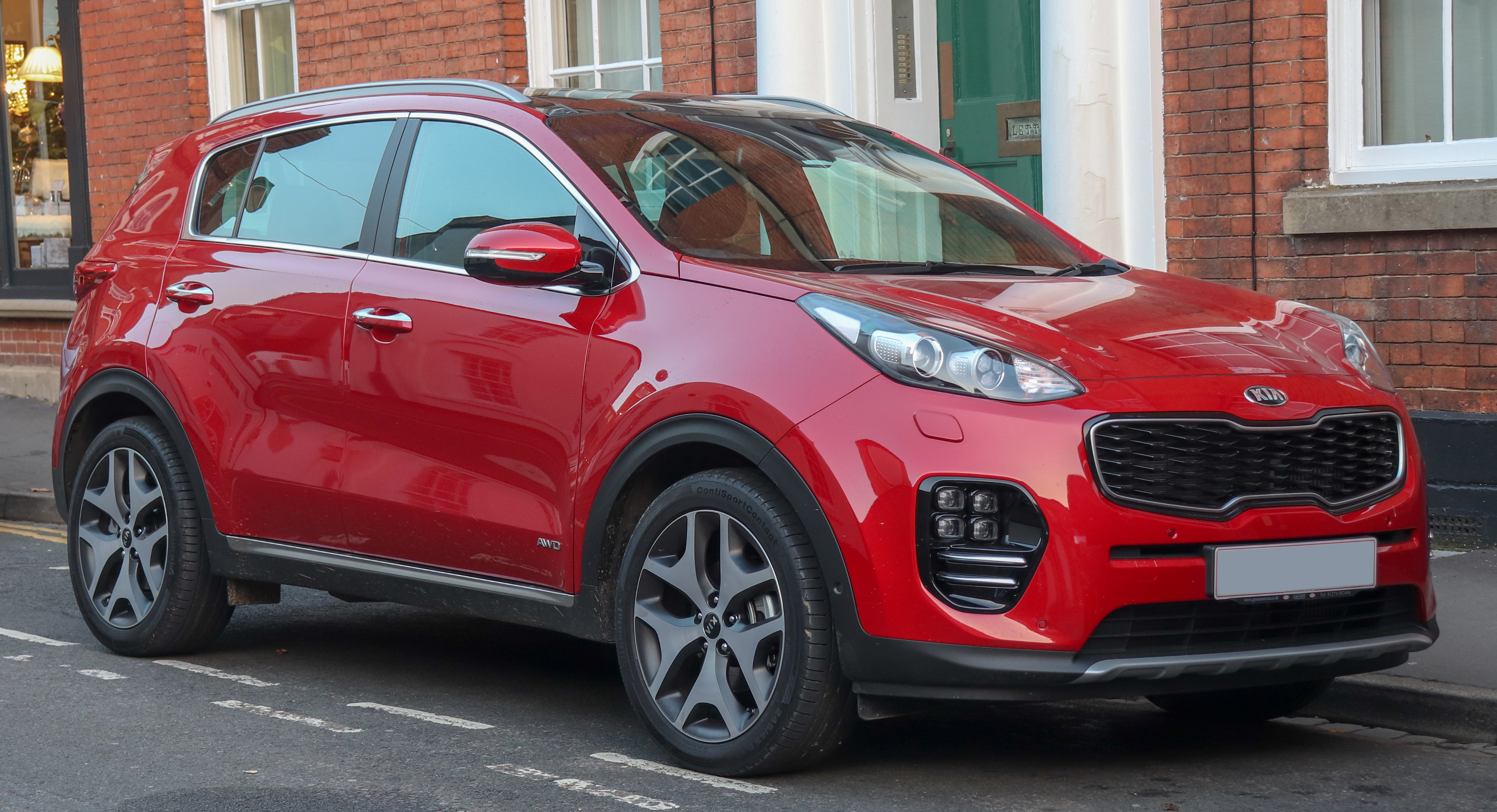
- Kia Sportage GT-Line pre-facelift (UK)

Overview
- Model code: QL
- Also called: Kia KX5 (China)
- Production: September 2015 – 2021; 2019–2025 (Pakistan)
- Model years: 2017–2022
- Assembly: South Korea: Gwangju (Gwangju Plant); Slovakia: Žilina (Kia Motors Slovakia); China: Yancheng (DYK); Malaysia: Gurun (NAM); Russia: Kaliningrad (Avtotor); Pakistan: Karachi (Kia Lucky Motors); Algeria: Batna (GLOVIZ)
- Designer: Park Jae Kwon; Min Jae Kwon (facelift); Under the lead of Peter Schreyer

Body and chassis
- Layout: Front-engine, front-wheel-drive; Front-engine, all-wheel drive
- Related: Hyundai Tucson (TL)

Powertrain
- Engine: Petrol: 1.6 L Gamma GDi I4; 1.6 L Gamma T-GDi I4; 2.0 L Nu MPi I4; 2.0 L Nu GDi I4; 2.0 L Theta II T-GDi I4; 2.4 L Theta II MPi I4; 2.4 L Theta II GDi I4; Diesel: 1.6 L Smartstream D1.6 CRDi I4; 1.7 L U II CRDi I4; 2.0 L R II CRDi I4
- Electric motor: Mild-Hybrid-Starter-Generator (MHSG)
- Transmission: 6-speed manual; 6-speed automatic; 7-speed DCT; 8-speed automatic
- Hybrid drivetrain: Mild Hybrid (EcoDynamics+)

Dimensions
- Wheelbase: 2,670 mm (105.1 in)
- Length: 4,480 mm (176.4 in); 4,550 mm (179.1 in) (China)
- Width: 1,855 mm (73.0 in)
- Height: 1,635–1,645 mm (64.4–64.8 in); 1,655 mm (65.2 in) (China)
- Curb weight: 1,465–1,770 kg (3,230–3,902 lb)

Kia unveiled its newly redesigned Sportage at the Frankfurt Motor Show in September 2015, and brought it to market in 2016 (as a 2017 model in North America). The company said the contrasting sharp edges and smooth surfaces were inspired by modern fighter jets.

There are three petrol engines, as well as one diesel engine in the line-up. The petrol options are a 1.6-litre, 2.0-litre or 2.4-litre, offering 97 kW (132 PS) and 161 N⋅m (119 lb⋅ft), 120 kW (163 PS) and 200 N⋅m (148 lb⋅ft), and 138 kW (188 PS) and 241 N⋅m (178 lb⋅ft) respectively, while the diesel is a 2.0-litre, R-series turbo producing 135 kW (184 PS) and 400 N⋅m (295 lb⋅ft). A 130 kW (177 PS) and 265 N⋅m (195 lb⋅ft) 1.6 T-GDi turbo-petrol with an optional seven-speed dual-clutch automatic is also available. Front- (FWD) and all-wheel drive (AWD) configurations are available.

In North America, the fourth generation Sportage was offered with three trim levels (LX, EX, and SX). Much like the previous model, it is available with two inline-four engine choices, a naturally aspirated 2.4-litre and a turbocharged 2.0-litre. The 2.4-litre produces 181 hp (135 kW) and 175 lb⋅ft (237 N⋅m), while the turbocharged engine makes 240 hp (179 kW) and 260 lb⋅ft (353 N⋅m), with small variations in performance dependent on whether FWD or AWD is configured. Both engines are mated to a six-speed automatic transmission.

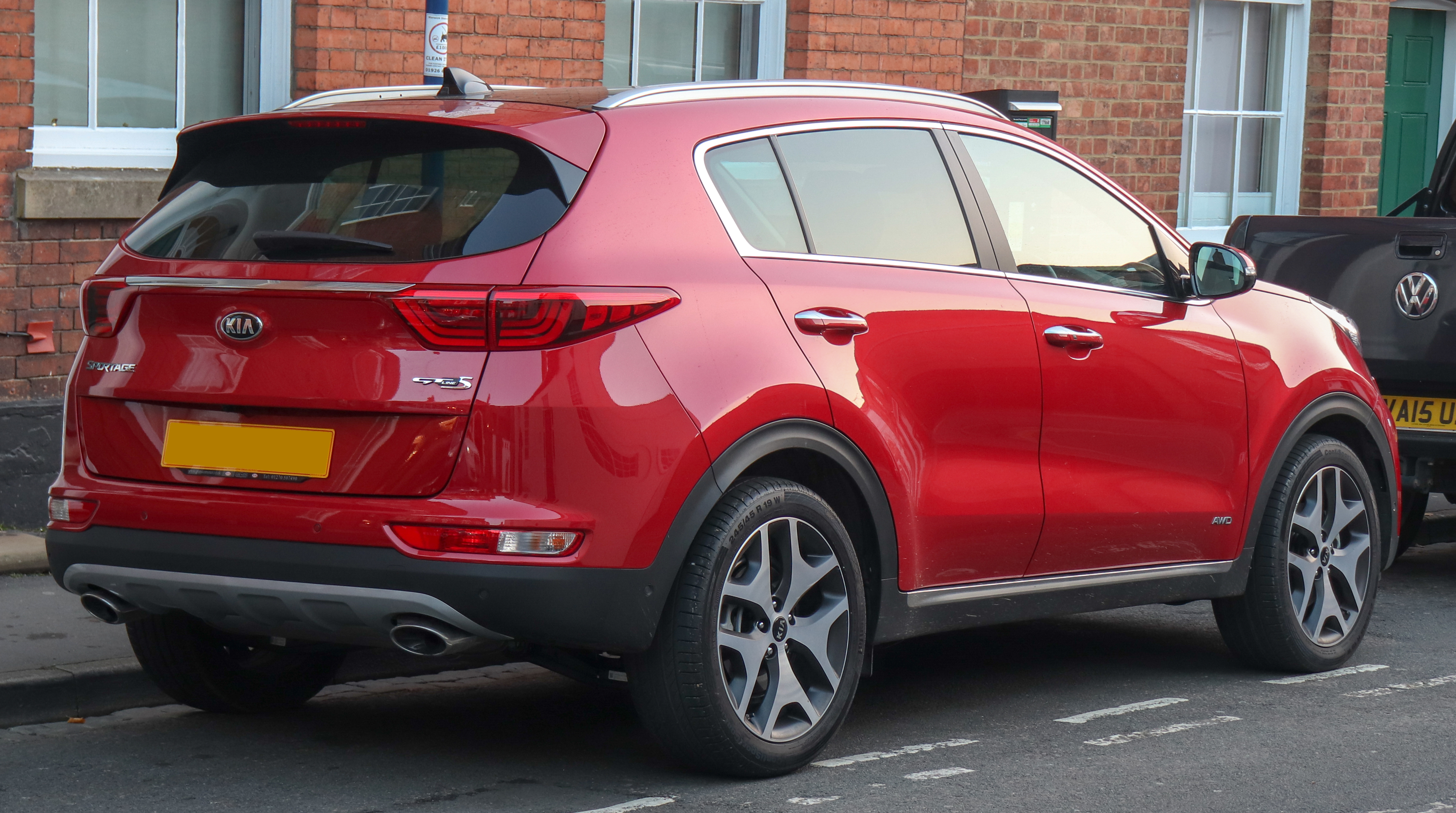
Rear view (UK)

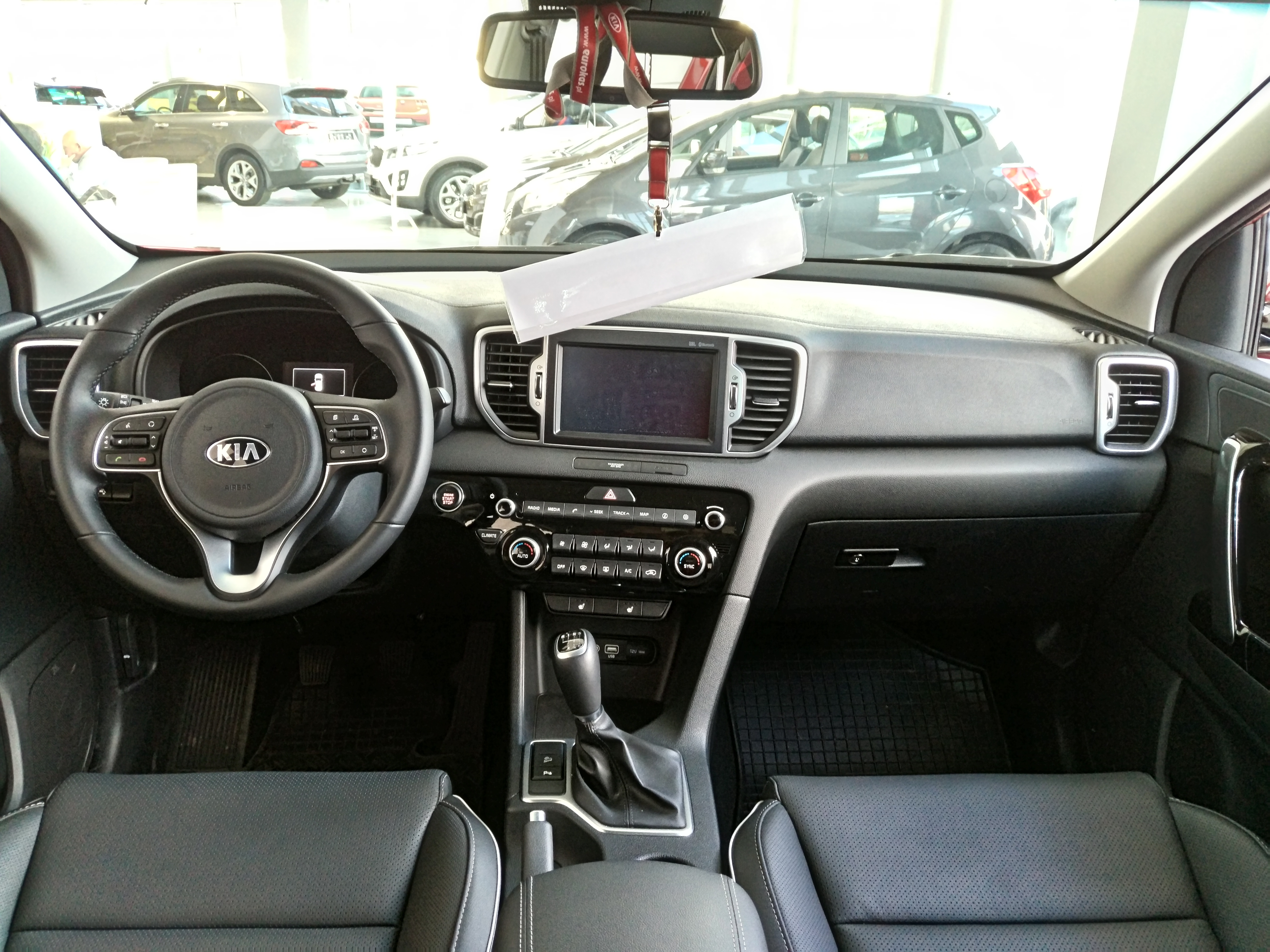
Interior

=== Facelift ===
In North America, the facelift model was introduced mid-2019 as an early 2020 model year. The changes included redesigned headlights and bumpers, with the front end taking cues from the recently introduced Stinger. Equipment levels were raised somewhat across the board, while a new, somewhat sporty model called "S" was introduced, priced between the LX and EX models.

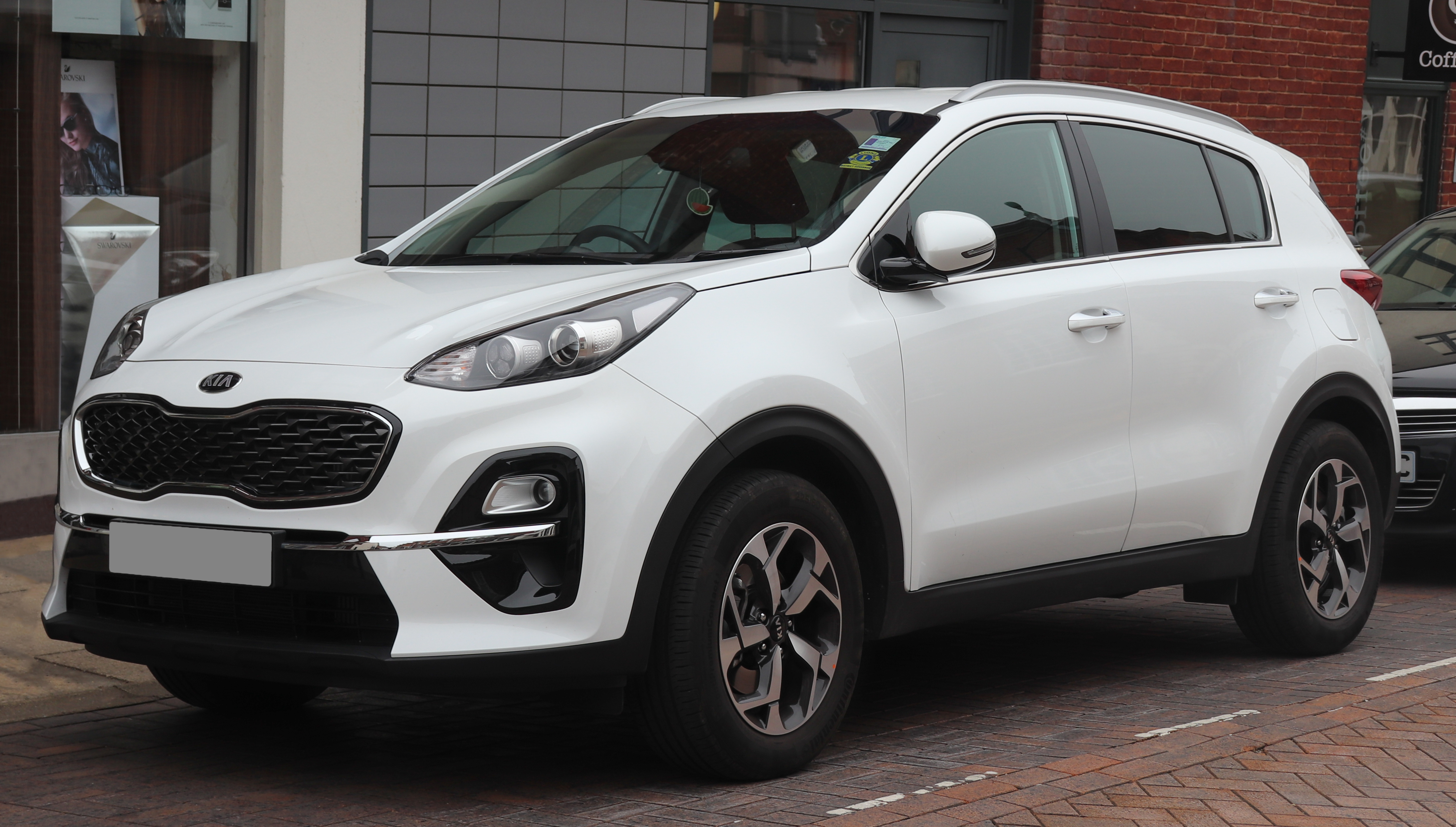
Facelift (UK)

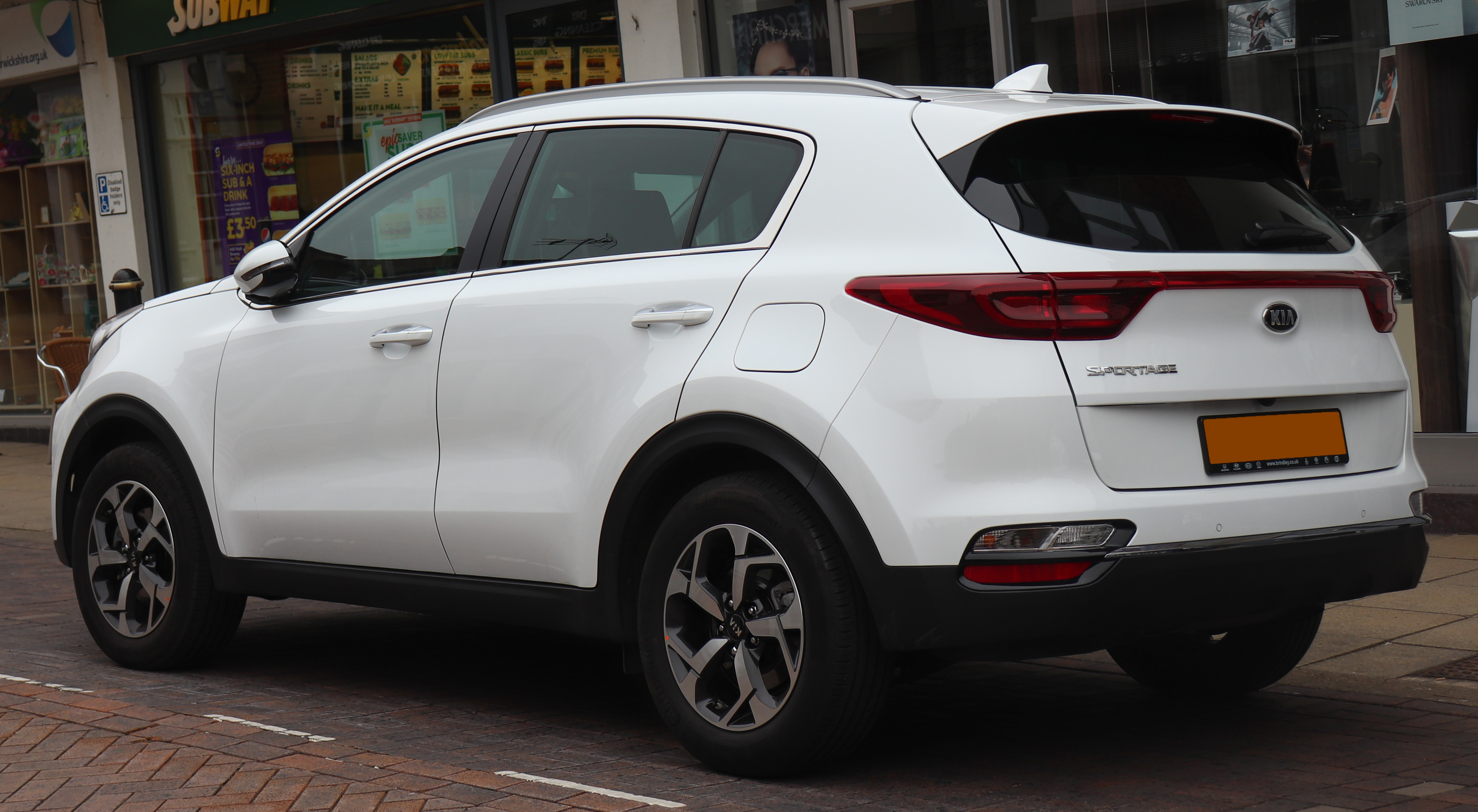
Facelift (UK)

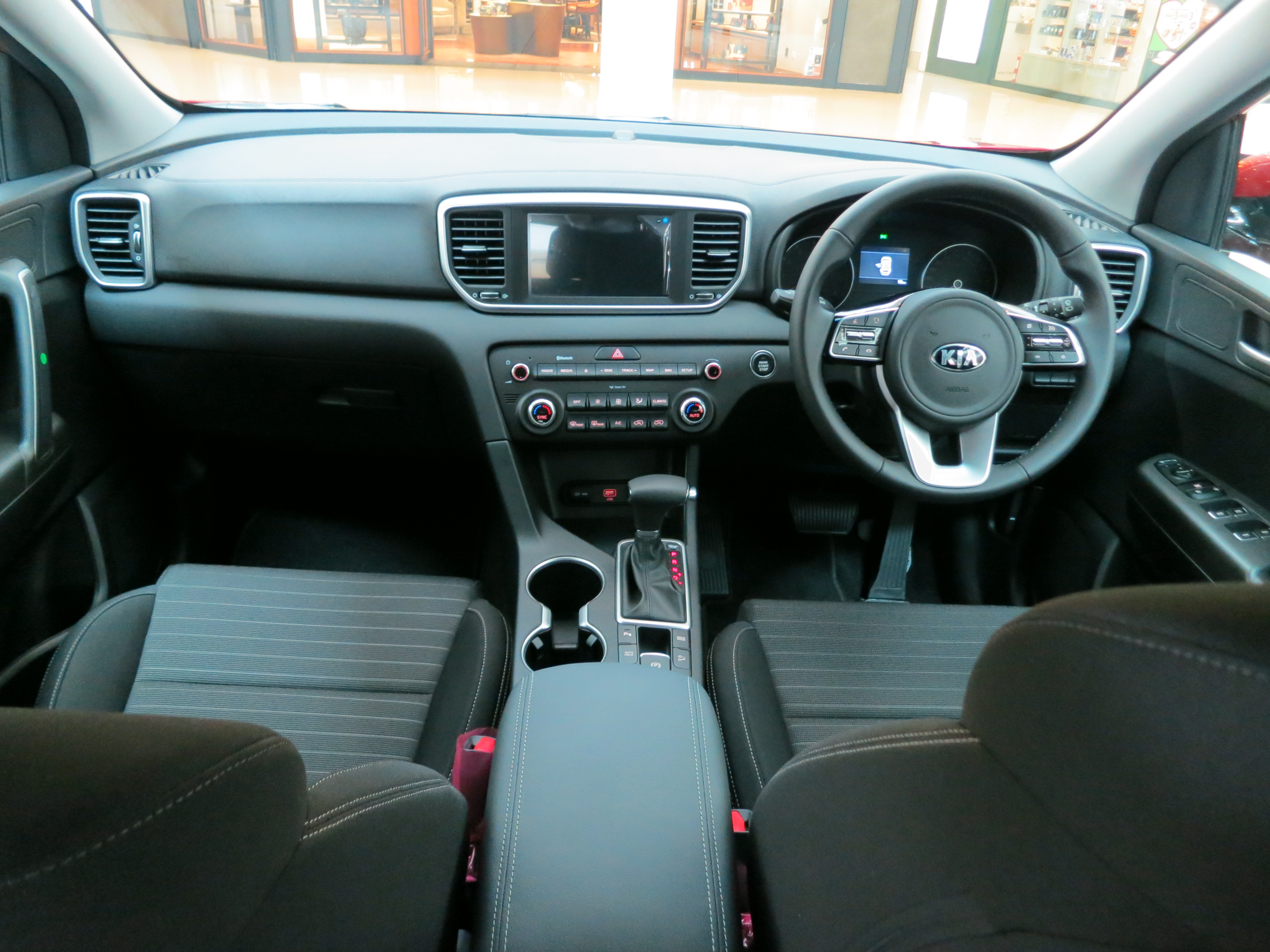
Facelift interior

=== Safety ===
The Latin American Sportage has ventilated front disc brakes and solid ones in the rear.

==== Euro NCAP ====
The Sportage in its standard European market configuration received 5 stars from Euro NCAP in 2015.

==== Latin NCAP ====
The Korean-made Sportage in its most basic Latin American market configuration with 2 airbags and no ESC received 0 stars from Latin NCAP 3.0 in 2021 (similar to Euro NCAP 2014).

Latin NCAP 3.0 test results Kia Sportage + 2 Airbags (2021, similar to Euro NCAP 2014)
| Test | Points | % |
|---|---|---|
| Overall: | 0 /5 stars | |
| Adult occupant: | 19.26 | 48% |
| Child occupant: | 7.29 | 15% |
| Pedestrian: | 27.67 | 58% |
| Safety assist: | 3.00 | 7% |

==== IIHS ====
===== 2017 =====
The 2017 Sportage received a "Top Safety Pick" rating from the Insurance Institute for Highway Safety.

IIHS scores
| Test | Rating | |
| Overall: | 5/5 stars | |
| Small overlap front (Driver) | Good | |
| Small overlap front (Passenger) | Good | |
| Moderate overlap front | Good | |
| Side (original test) | Good | |
| Side (updated test) | Marginal | |
| Roof strength | Good | |
| Head restraints and seats | Good | |
| Headlights | Poor | |
| Front crash prevention (Vehicle-to-Vehicle) | Superior | optional |
| Child seat anchors (LATCH) ease of use | Acceptable | |

===== 2022 =====
The 2022 Sportage was tested by the IIHS and its top trim received a Top Safety Pick award:

IIHS scores
| Small overlap front (Driver) | Good | |
| Small overlap front (Passenger) | Good | |
| Moderate overlap front | Good | |
| Side (original test) | Good | |
| Side (updated test) | Marginal | |
| Roof strength | Good | |
| Head restraints and seats | Good | |
| Headlights | Acceptable / Poor | varies by trim/option |
| Front crash prevention (Vehicle-to-Vehicle) | Superior | optional |
| Front crash prevention (Vehicle-to-Vehicle) | Superior | standard |
| Front crash prevention (Vehicle-to-Pedestrian, day) | Advanced | optional |
| Seat belt reminders | Acceptable | |
| Child seat anchors (LATCH) ease of use | Acceptable | |

==== ANCAP ====
ANCAP test results Kia Sportage all variants (2016)
| Test | Score |
|---|---|
| Overall | 5 /5 stars |
| Frontal offset | 13.62/16 |
| Side impact | 16/16 |
| Pole | 2/2 |
| Seat belt reminders | 3/3 |
| Whiplash protection | Good |
| Pedestrian protection | Adequate |
| Electronic stability control | Standard |

=== Awards ===
The Sportage won the 2016 Red Dot Award for Car Design.

=== Kia KX5 (Chinese version) ===
In China, the fourth generation Sportage was sold as the Kia KX5, the third generation model was sold alongside as the Sportage R, while the Kia Sportage name was used on a separate model developed from the second generation Hyundai ix35 chassis and also sold alongside.

The Kia KX5 received a facelift in 2019 conducted by Dongfeng Yueda Kia that would exclusively be sold in China only.

Available from March 2019, the front fascia was completely restyled with headlamps integrated with the grille and the rear end of the KX5 was also slightly redesigned for the Chinese market. Despite the exclusively restyled exterior, the wheels of the Chinese version are the same as the ones on the international Kia Sportage facelift.

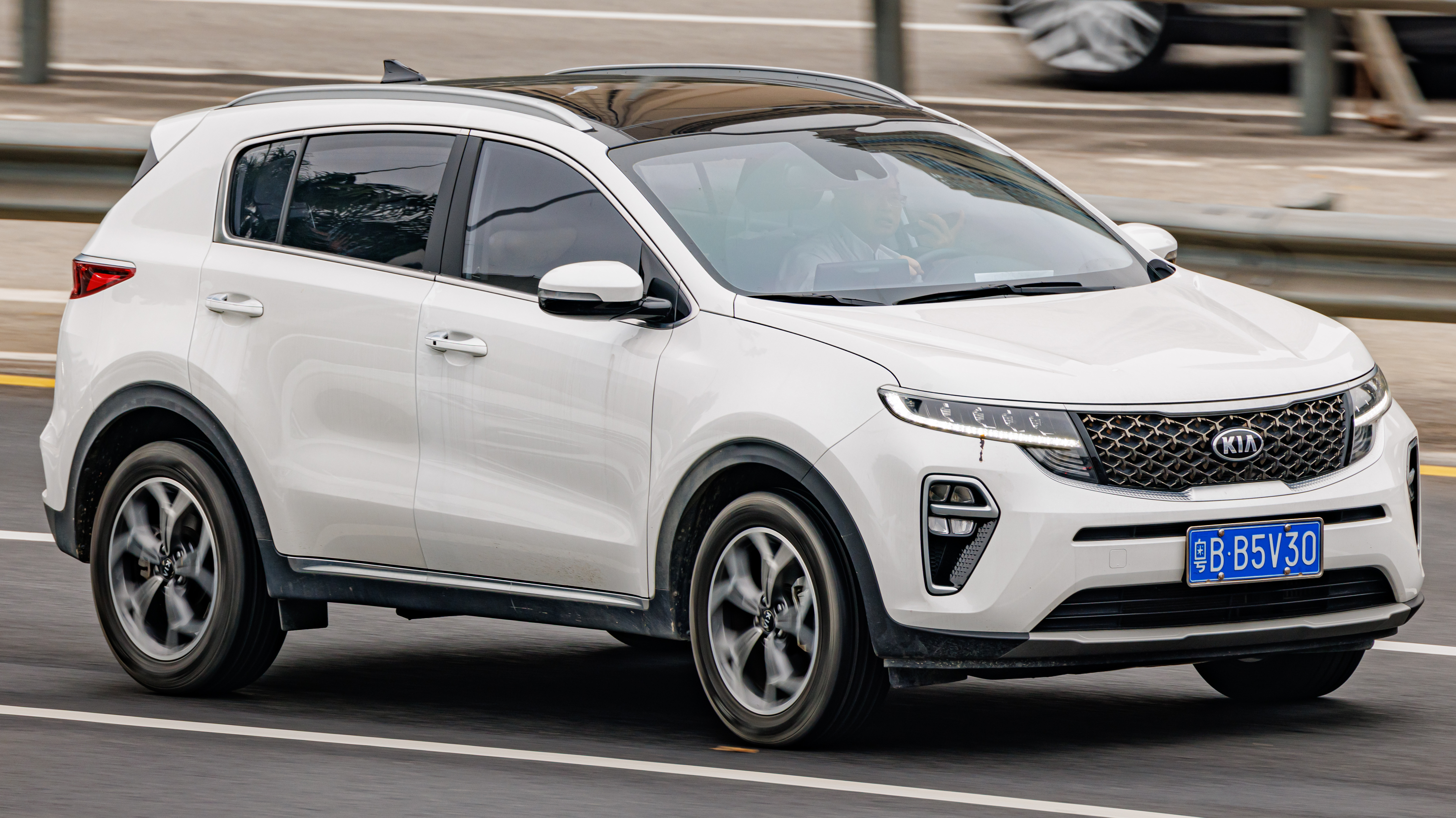
Facelift Kia KX5

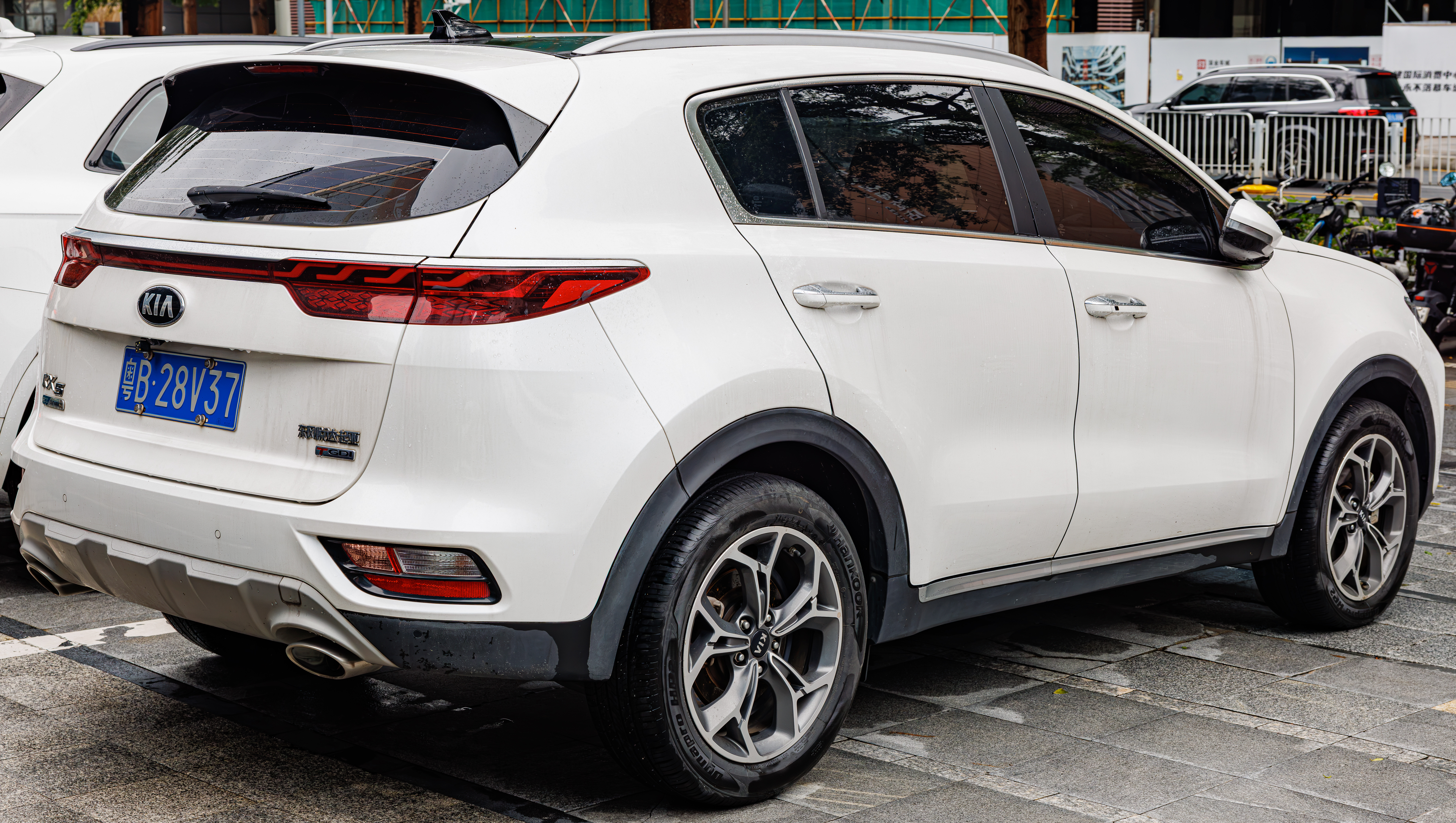
Facelift Kia KX5

== Fifth generation (NQ5; 2021) ==
Fifth generation
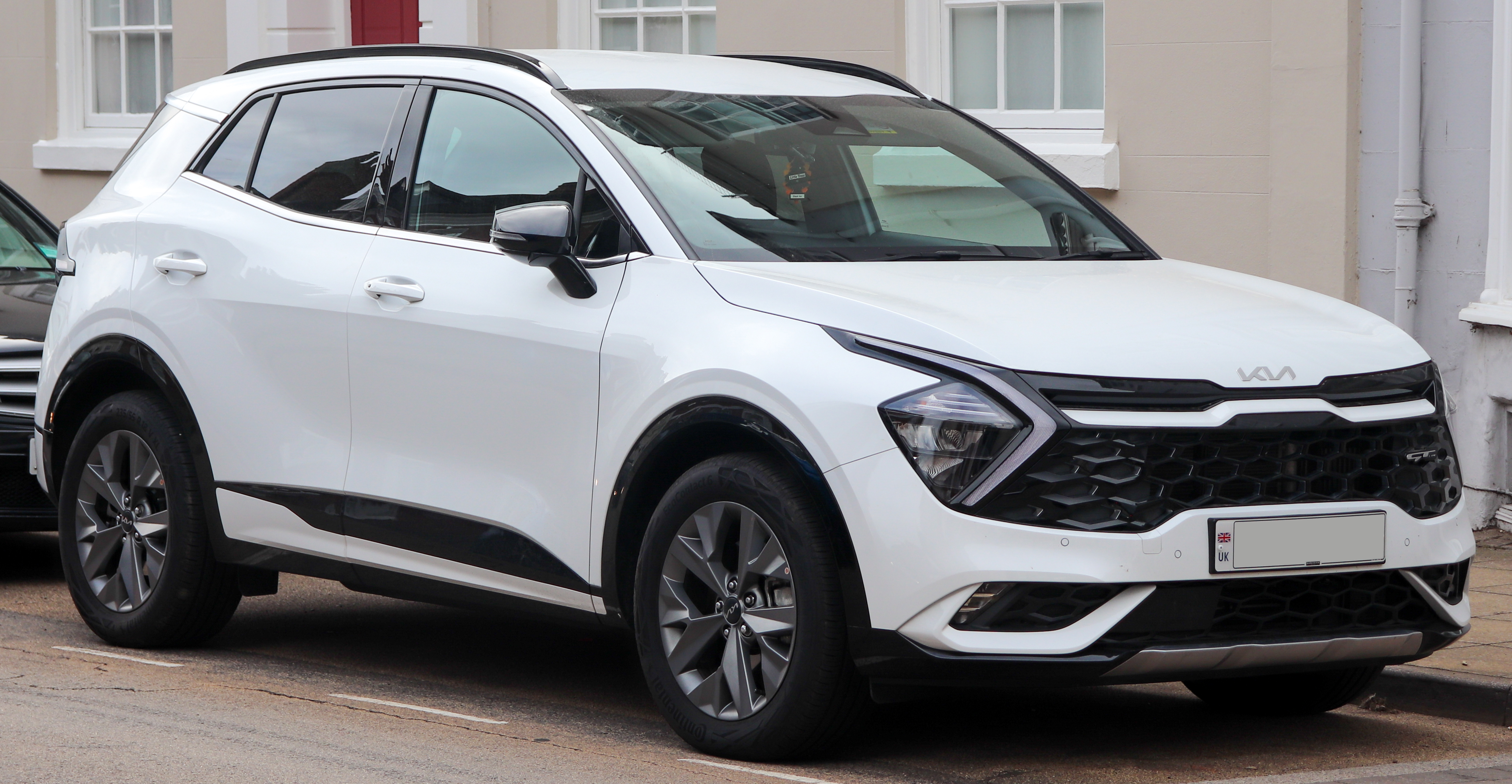
- Kia Sportage (Europe; SWB)

Overview
- Model code: NQ5
- Production: 2021–present
- Model years: 2023–present
- Assembly: South Korea: Gwangju (Gwangju Plant); Slovakia: Žilina (Kia Slovakia); United States: West Point, Georgia (KMMG, 2021–present); Bryan County, Georgia (HMG Metaplant America, 2026–present); China: Yancheng (Yueda Kia); Pakistan: Karachi (Kia Lucky Motors); Malaysia: Kulim, Kedah (Inokom); Russia: Kaliningrad (Avtotor); Vietnam: Chu Lai (THACO Kia); Bangladesh: Sreepur Upazila, Gazipur (Meghna Group)
- Designer: Gregory Guillaume; Jochen Paesen

Body and chassis
- Layout: Front-engine, front-wheel-drive; Front-engine, all-wheel drive
- Platform: Hyundai-Kia N3
- Related: Hyundai Tucson (NX4); Hyundai Santa Cruz; Hyundai Mufasa; Hyundai Santa Fe (TM); Hyundai Santa Fe (MX5); Kia Sorento (MQ4)

Powertrain
- Engine: Petrol: 1.6 L Smartstream G1.6 T-GDi I4; 2.0 L Smartstream G2.0 MPi I4; 2.0 L Smartstream G2.0 T-GDi I4; 2.5 L Smartstream G2.5 GDi I4; Petrol hybrid: 1.6 L Smartstream G1.6 T-GDi 48V I4; 1.6 L Smartstream G1.6 T-GDi HEV I4; Petrol plug-in hybrid: 1.6 L Smartstream G1.6 T-GDi PHEV I4; LPG: 2.0 L Smartstream L2.0 LPi I4; Diesel: 1.6 L Smartstream D1.6 CRDi I4; 2.0 L Smartstream D2.0 CRDi I4; Diesel hybrid: 1.6 L Smartstream D1.6 CRDi 48V I4
- Electric motor: Mild-Hybrid Starter-Generator (MHSG) (EcoDynamics+); 44.7 kW (60.8 PS; 59.9 hp) permanent magnet electric motor (FHEV); 66.9 kW (91.0 PS; 89.7 hp) permanent magnet traction electric motor (PHEV)
- Transmission: 6-speed manual 6-speed automatic 7-speed DCT; 8-speed automatic
- Hybrid drivetrain: EcoDynamics+ MHEV; Full Hybrid Electric Vehicle (FHEV); PHEV (Sportage PHEV)
- Battery: 0.44 kWh 48-volt lithium-ion battery (MHEV); 1.49 kWh 270-volt Lithium-polymer (LiPo) (FHEV); 13.8 kWh 360-volt Lithium-polymer (LiPo) (PHEV)

Dimensions
- Wheelbase: 2,680 mm (105.5 in) (SWB); 2,755 mm (108.5 in) (LWB)
- Length: 4,515 mm (177.8 in) (SWB); 4,660 mm (183.5 in) (LWB)
- Width: 1,865 mm (73.4 in)
- Height: 1,650–1,660 mm (65.0–65.4 in)
- Curb weight: 1,525–1,615 kg (3,362–3,560 lb) (1.6T); 1,615–1,715 kg (3,560–3,781 lb) (2.0D)

The fifth-generation Sportage was unveiled on 8 June 2021, with specifications revealed in July 2021. Based on the brand’s latest N3 platform, Kia developed two versions of the Sportage with different body length and wheelbase depending on the market.

The model is equipped with a Terrain Mode that automatically adjusts various settings depending on conditions, including snow, mud, and sand. It also features electric control suspension (ECS) on some models that provides continuous damping control in real-time. Hybrid and plug-in hybrid models will also feature an E-Handling system. lt is also equipped with a more compact shift-by-wire transmission dial for the automatic model.

The vehicle has also been equipped with updated safety systems such as autonomous emergency braking (AEB), navigation-augmented adaptive cruise control, lane centering assist and advanced blind-spot collision-avoidance assistance system.

For the long-wheelbase model (LWB), Kia claims the fifth-generation Sportage received an increased 80 mm (3.1 in) of legroom and 7 mm (0.3 in) of headroom, with overall dimensions at 1,050 mm (41.3 in) and 1,000 mm (39.4 in) respectively.

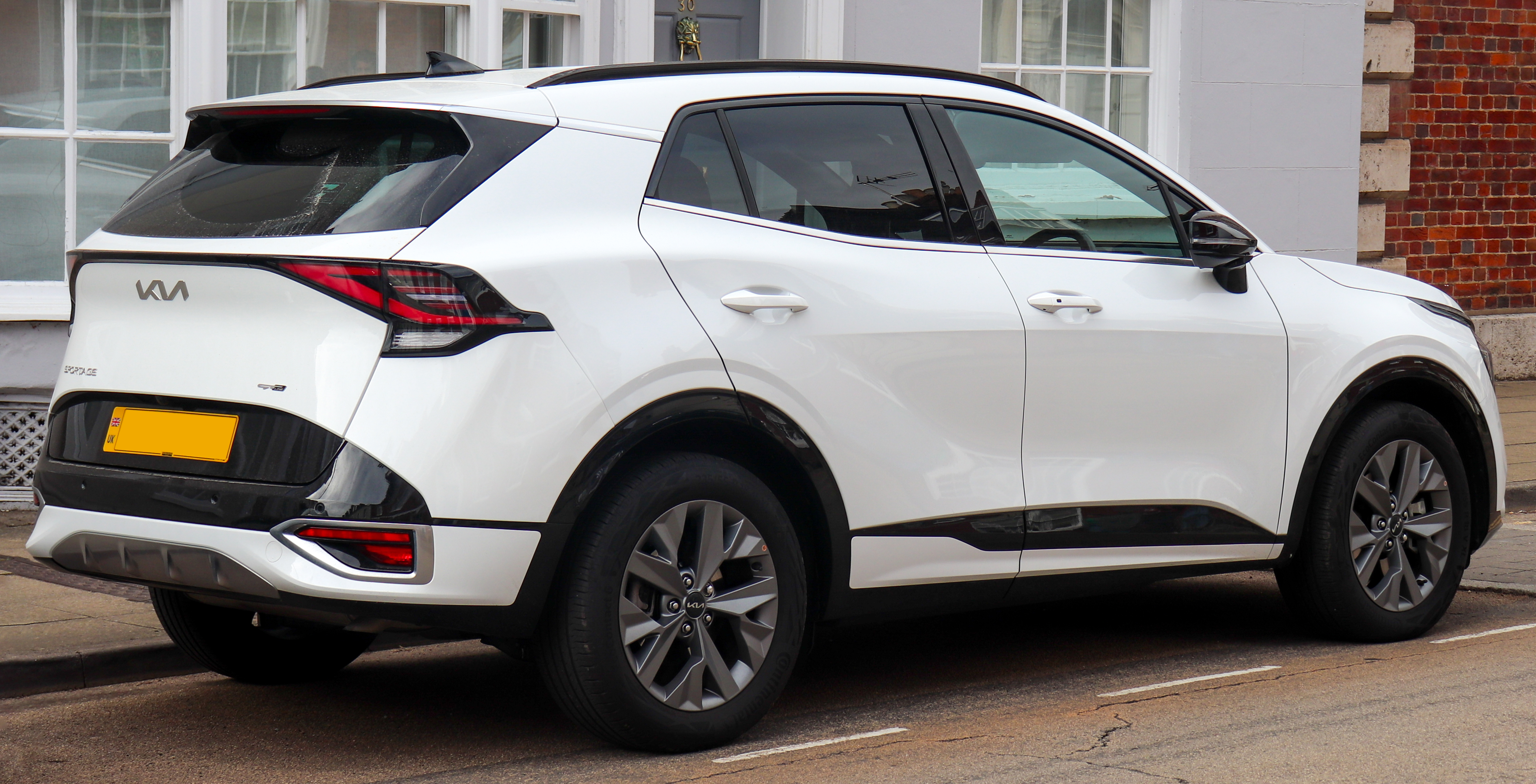
Rear view (SWB)

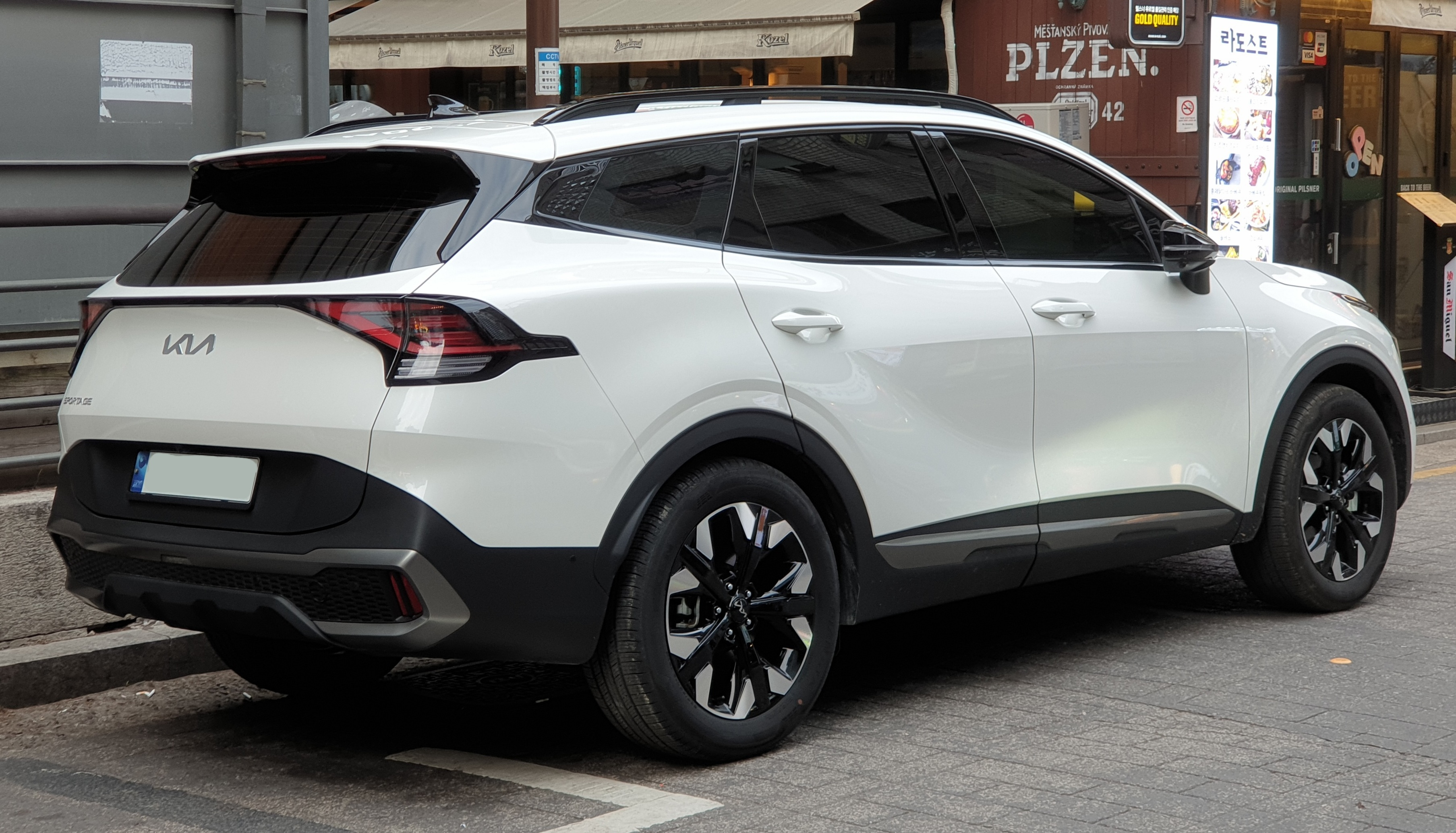
Rear view (LWB)

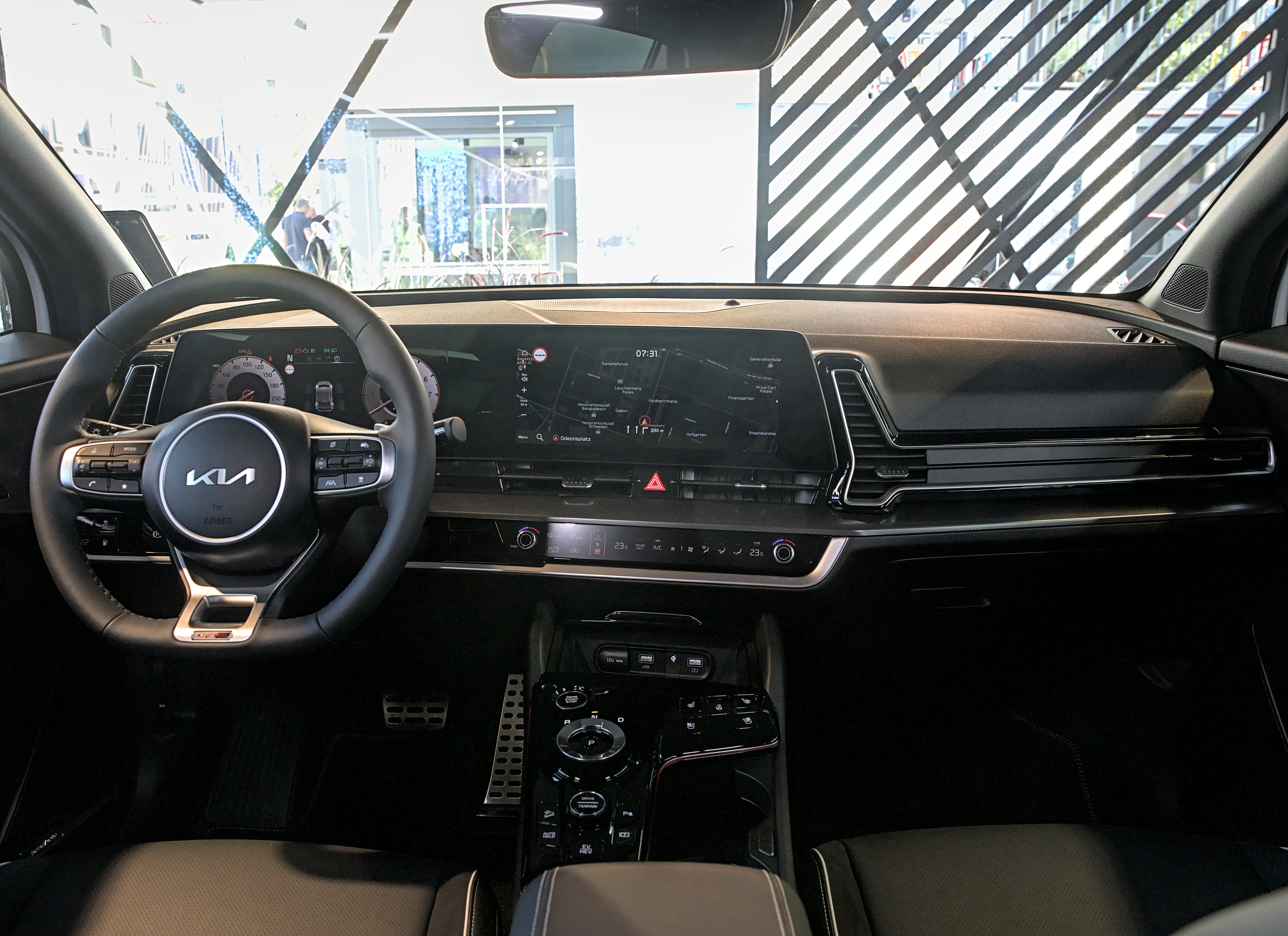
Interior

=== 2024 facelift ===
Kia released the facelift model of the fifth-generation Sportage on 5 November 2024 for the 2026 model year. Changes includes an updated front fascia with new headlights (replacing the prior boomerang headlights) and updated front bumper design, new LED graphics for the taillights, new exterior colours and new alloy wheel designs. Inside, there is a new 2-spoke design steering wheel, a new curved digital cockpit houses the digital instrument cluster and 12.3-inch touchscreen infotainment system, new air-con vents and new interior features. Other changes are an improved dampening system on the front axle, additional sound-absorbing materials, and the 7-speed dual-clutch automatic used for 1.6 T-GDi turbocharged petrol engine was replaced with the 8-speed automatic.

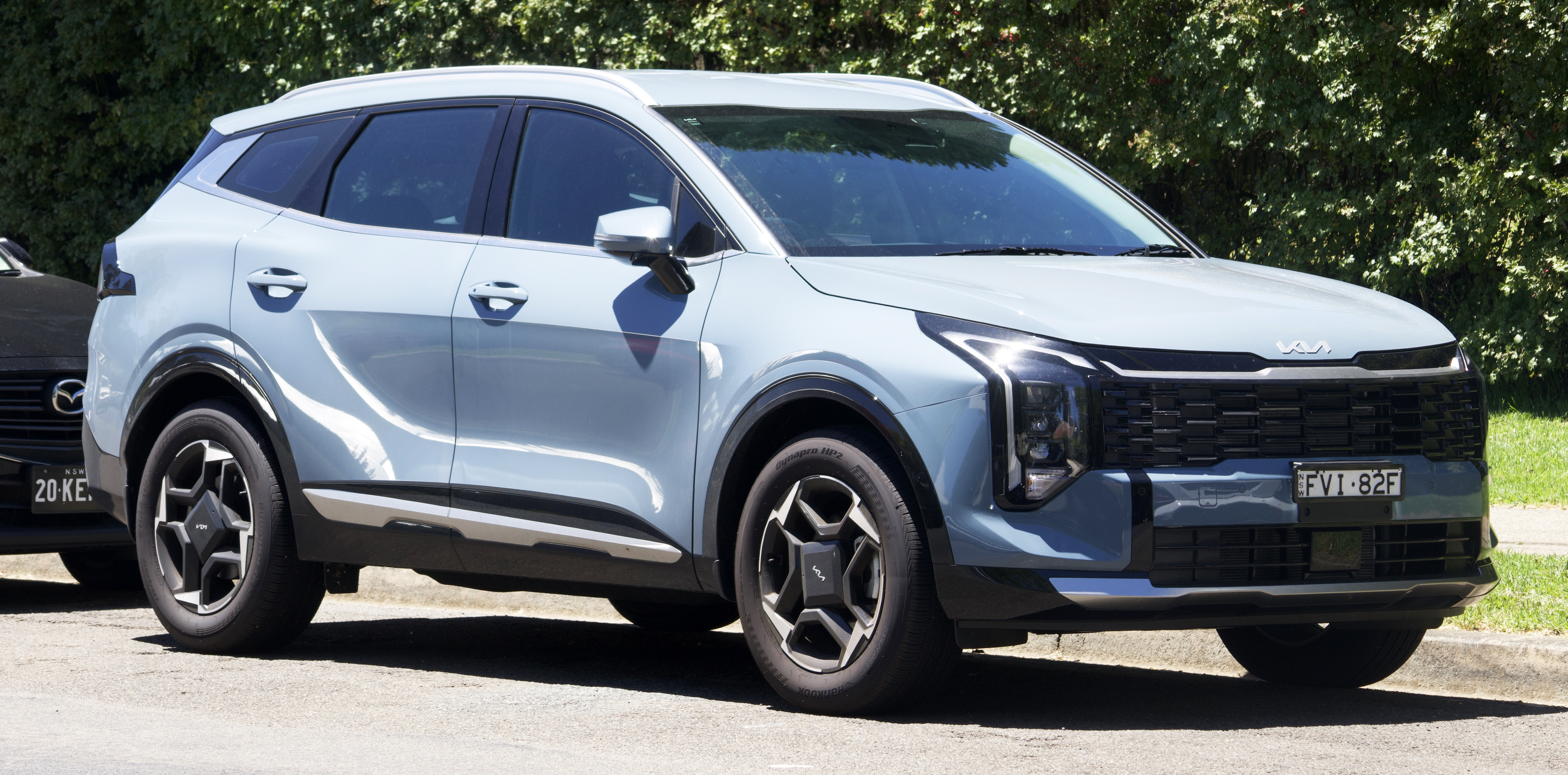
2024 facelift (LWB)

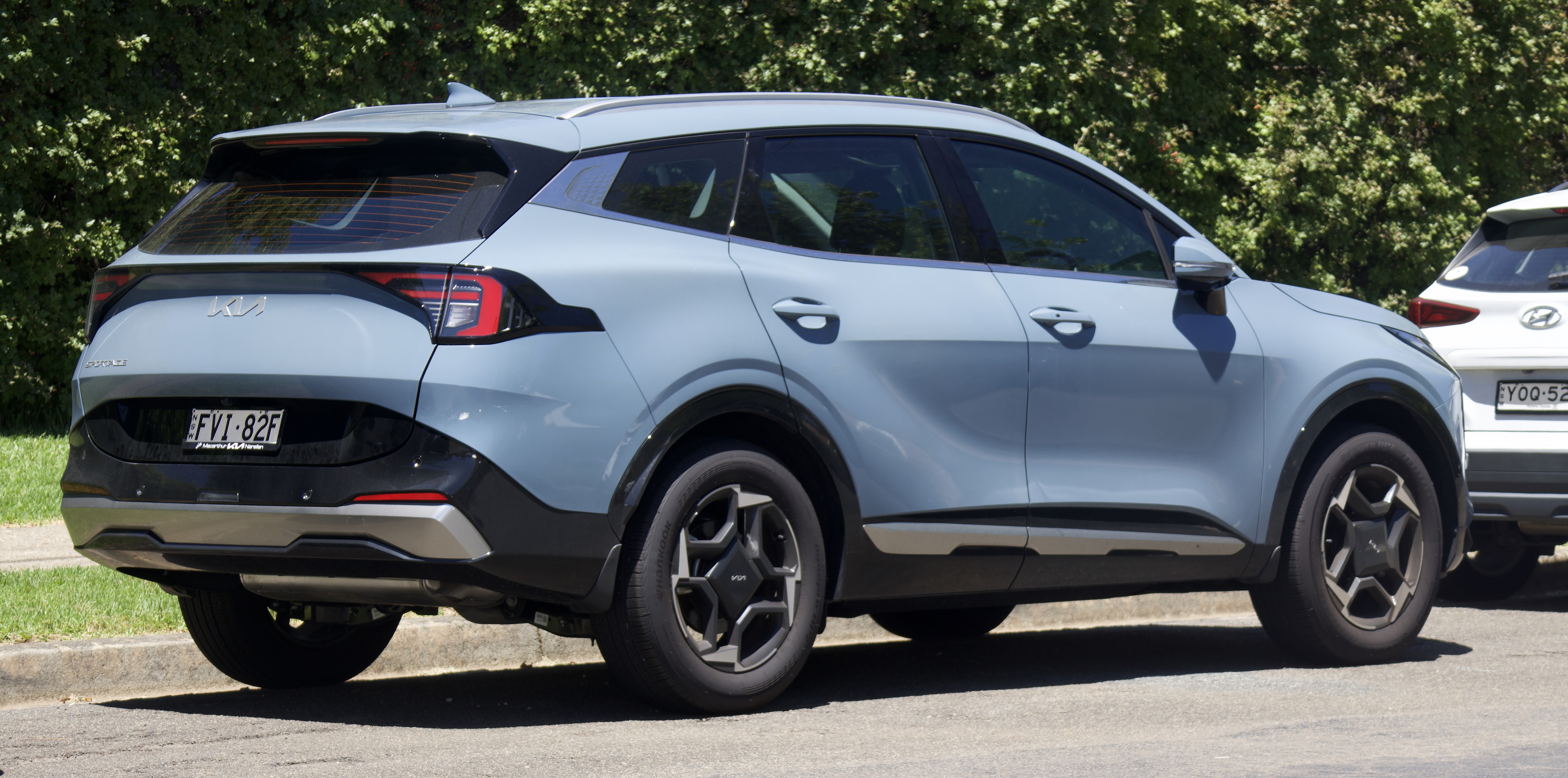
Rear view (LWB)

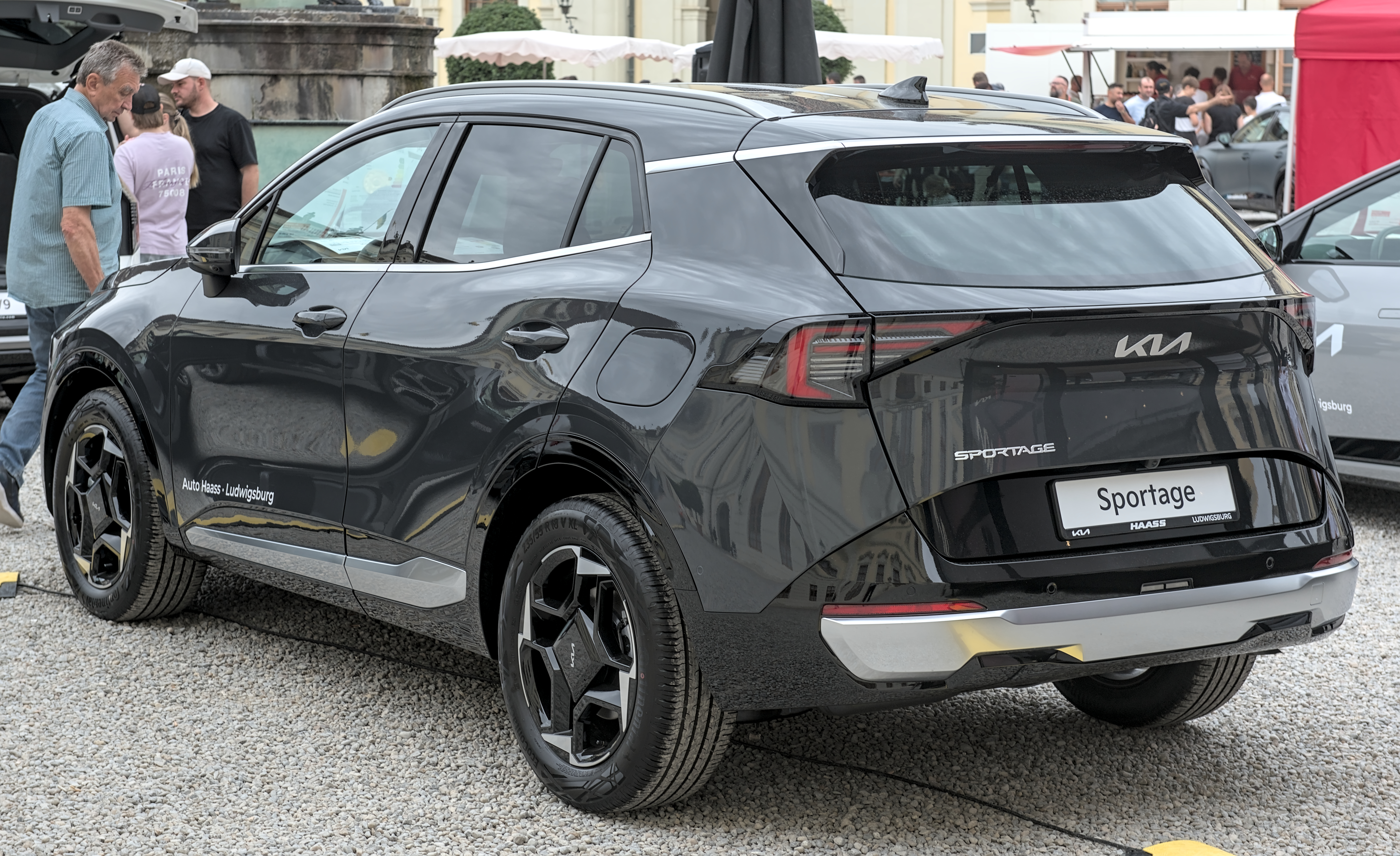
Rear view (SWB)

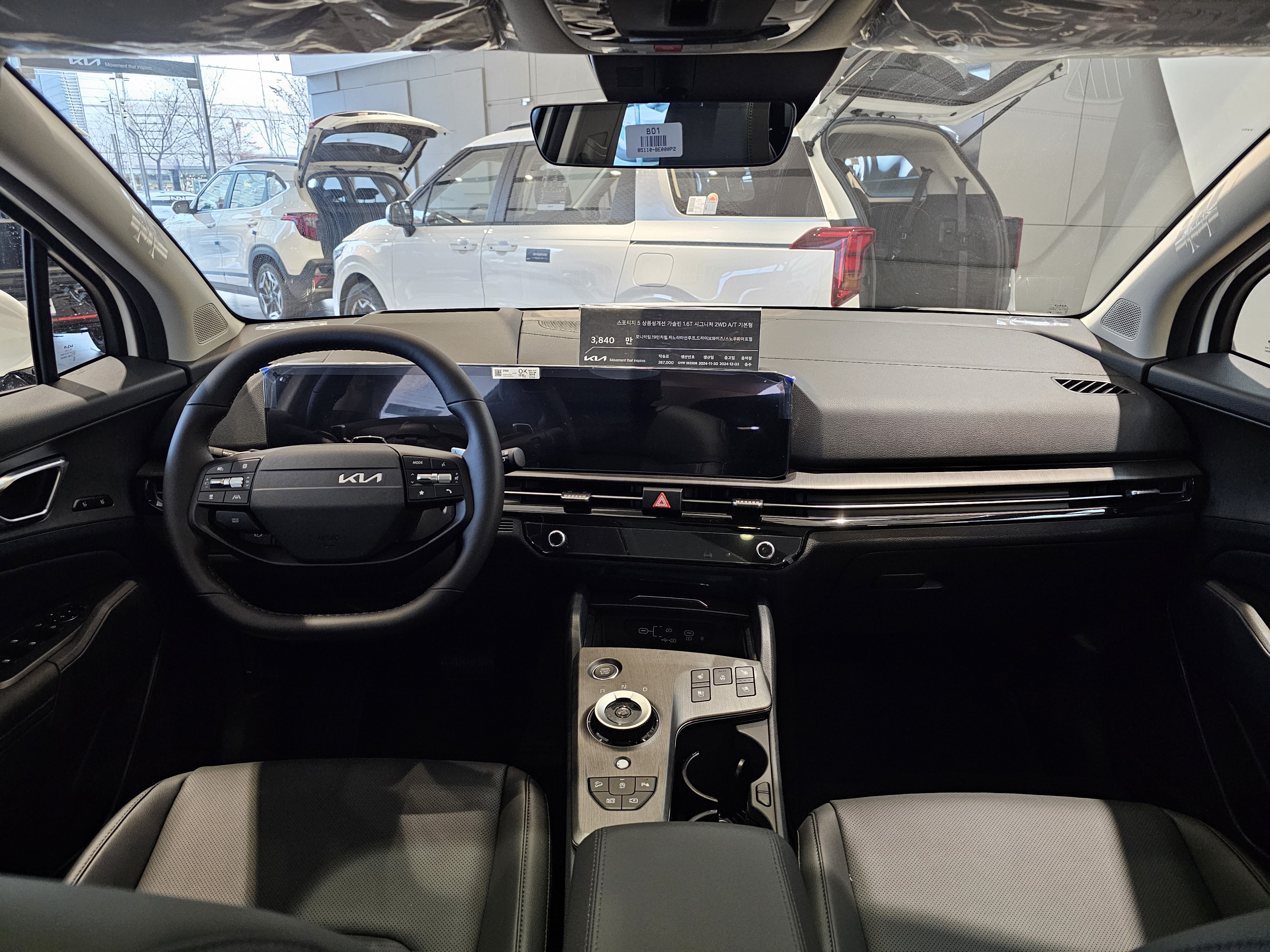
Interior

=== Markets ===
==== Asia ====
===== Malaysia =====
The fifth-generation Sportage was launched in Malaysia on 4 December 2024. Locally assembled at the Inokom plant in Kulim, Kedah, it is available with four variants: 2.0G 2WD, 2.0G 2WD High, 1.6T 2WD High and 1.6T AWD High. Two powertrains were available: a 1.6-litre T-GDi turbocharged petrol and a 2.0-litre MPi petrol.

===== Pakistan =====
The fifth-generation Sportage was launched in Pakistan in 29 January 2025 in long-wheelbase version marketed as the Sportage L. Three variants are available: Alpha, FWD and 1.6 HEV. The base Alpha and FWD variants comes with a 2.0-litre MPi petrol while the top HEV variant comes with a 1.6-litre T-GDi hybrid shared with the Tucson. Unlike the previous model marketed in Pakistan, all models are front-wheel drive only.

===== Philippines =====
The fifth-generation Sportage was launched in the Philippines on 24 July 2026, with two trim levels: EX and SX. Both variants are powered by the 1.6-litre T-GDi hybrid engine paired to a 6-speed automatic.

===== Taiwan =====
The fifth-generation Sportage was launched in Taiwan on 8 June 2022, with three trim levels: Trendy, Apex and X-Line. All variants are powered by the 1.6-litre T-GDi turbocharged petrol paired with a 7-speed DCT, and all-wheel drive comes standard on the X-Line trim. In July 2024, the Sportage 30th Anniversary Edition model was made available limited to 200 units. In October 2024, the X-Line 2WD variant was added to the line-up and the former X-Line variant equipped with all-wheel drive became the X-Line 4WD. In May 2025, the Sportage Adventure Edition based on the X-Line 4WD variant was made available in limited quantities.

The facelifted Sportage was released in Taiwan in May 2026, with four trim levels: Turbo-Hybrid Trendy, Turbo-Hybrid Apex, Turbo-Hybrid Signature and X-Line 4WD.

===== Vietnam =====
The fifth-generation Sportage was launched in Vietnam on 10 June 2022, in four trim levels: Luxury, Premium, Signature and Signature X-Line. Three powertrains were available: a 1.6-litre T-GDi turbocharged petrol, a 2.0-litre MPi petrol and a 2.0-litre CRDi turbocharged petrol, all-wheel drive is standard on the 1.6-litre T-GDi turbocharged petrol while the latter two powertrains comes standard with front-wheel drive.

The facelifted Sportage was launched in Vietnam on 10 June 2026, with four trim levels: Deluxe, Luxury, Premium and Signature. For powertrains, the Deluxe and Luxury trims are equipped with 2.0-litre MPi petrol, while the Premium and Signature trims are equipped with the 1.6-litre T-GDi Hybrid turbocharged petrol hybrid, and all-wheel drive optional on the Signature trim.

==== Europe ====
The short-wheelbase, European-spec fifth-generation Sportage was announced in September 2021. It is shorter in length by 135 mm (5.3 in), and shorter in wheelbase by 75 mm (3.0 in) compared to the international model. Other differences include the deletion of a window on the rear quarter panel, and a modified front fascia.

For the European market, Kia offers several range of drivetrains that includes plug-in hybrid, hybrid, mild hybrid, and diesel engine. The PHEV version features a 1.6-litre four-cylinder T-GDi engine and a 66.9 kW permanent magnet traction electric motor with a 13.8 kWh lithium-ion battery. The whole system produces 261 hp (265 PS; 195 kW). The hybrid model with same T-GDi engine and a 44.2 kW electric motor paired with a 1.49 kWh battery and produces 226 hp (229 PS; 169 kW).

The mild-hybrid model also uses the 1.6-litre T-GDi engine, which produces either 147 hp (149 PS; 110 kW) or 177 hp (179 PS; 132 kW). The 1.6-litre four-cylinder diesel engine is available with an option of 113 hp (115 PS; 84 kW) or 134 hp (136 PS; 100 kW) of power output. A 7-speed dual-clutch transmission is available for the 1.6-litre while a 6-speed manual transmission is standard for all variants. All European models are equipped with Stop-and-Go technology.

==== Latin America ====
===== Argentina =====
The fifth-generation Sportage was launched in Argentina on 7 November 2023, with two variants: EX 2WD and X Line 4WD, both variants are powered by the 1.6-litre T-GDi turbocharged petrol paired with a 7-speed DCT.

The facelifted Sportage was launched in Argentina on 20 August 2025, with two variants: EX 2WD and X Line 4WD. For powertrains, the EX 2WD variant use the 1.6-litre T-GDi turbocharged petrol and the X Line 4WD variant use the 2.0-litre MPi petrol.

===== Brazil =====
The fifth-generation Sportage in the short-wheelbase version was launched in Brazil on 1 July 2022, with two trim levels: EX and EX Prestige, it is powered by a 1.6 T-GDi 48V turbocharged petrol mild hybrid.

The facelifted Sportage was launched in Brazil on 10 November 2025, in the sole EX Prestige variant powered by the 1.6 T-GDi 48V turbocharged petrol mild hybrid.

===== Mexico =====
The fifth-generation Sportage was launched in Mexico on 14 March 2023, in three trim levels: EX, EX Pack and SXL. Two powertrains are available: 2.0-litre MPi petrol and a 2.5-litre GDi petrol. In February 2024, the Hybrid version based on the SXL trim was added to the range.

The facelifted Sportage was released in Mexico in May 2025, with the new X-Line trim for the Hybrid version.

In August 2026, the Sportage was updated for the 2027 model year which saw equipment changes, the introduction of the 1.6-litre T-GDi turbocharged petrol for the SX and X Line trims, and an updated trim structure. The 2027 model year Sportage is available in EX, SX and X Line trims for the petrol models, while the Hybrid models is available in EX Pack and X Line trims.

==== North America ====
The long-wheelbase, fifth-generation Sportage for United States and Canada was revealed in October 2021 as a 2023 model year. It is locally produced in West Point, Georgia instead of imported from South Korea. The hybrid version is equipped with the T-GDi engine and a 44.2 kW electric motor combined with a 1.49 kWh battery that also delivers 226 hp (229 PS; 169 kW). It has an estimated range of 500 mi (800 km) and can be optioned with front-wheel drive or all-wheel drive with central differential lock. It is available in seven trim levels in the US: LX, EX, X-Line, SX, SX Prestige, X-Pro and X-Pro Prestige, while in Canada, it is available in five trim levels: LX, X-Line, EX, EX Premium and X-Line Limited.

The facelifted Sportage was released in North America in May 2025.

==== Oceania ====
===== Australia =====
The fifth-generation Sportage was launched in Australia on 4 November 2021, with four trim levels: S, SX, SX+ and GT Line. Four powertrains were available: a 1.6-litre T-GDi turbocharged petrol with a 7 speed DCT (AWD), a 2.0-litre MPi petrol with either a 6 speed manual or 6 speed auto (FWD), and a 2.0-litre CRDi turbocharged diesel with an 8 speed auto (AWD). In March 2024, the FWD Hybrid version was added to the range for the SX and GT Line trim levels.

The facelifted Sportage was released in Australia in May 2025, with manual variants being discontinued and the all-wheel drive option became available for the Hybrid version. The 7-speed DCT on 1.6 T-GDi was replaced with a 8-speed automatic.

===== New Zealand =====
The fifth-generation Sportage was released in New Zealand on 4 November 2021 with sales commenced in January 2022. At launch, four trim levels were available: LX, LX+, Deluxe and X-Line. Three powertrains were available: a 1.6-litre T-GDi turbocharged petrol (AWD), a 2.0-litre MPi petrol (FWD) marketed as the 'Urban' and a 2.0-litre CRDi turbocharged diesel (AWD).

In January 2024, the Hybrid version was added to the range with two variants available.

==== South Africa ====
The fifth-generation Sportage in the short-wheelbase version was launched in South Africa on 15 September 2022, with five trim levels: LX, EX, GT Line, GT Line Plus and GT Line S. All variants are powered by a 1.6-litre T-GDi turbocharged petrol engine.

In May 2023, the 1.6-litre CRDi turbo-diesel engine was added for the LX, EX and GT Line Plus trim levels.

In November 2023, the Sportage range was updated which saw the Advanced Driver Assistance Systems (ADAS) safety package became standard on all variants. The 1.6-litre T-GDi petrol option was dropped for the LX and EX trim levels.

=== Powertrain ===
Specs
| Model | Years | Engine | Transmissions | Power | Torque | 0–100 km/h (0-62 mph) (Official) | Top speed |
Petrol engines
| Smartstream G1.6 T-GDi | 2021–present | 1,598 cc (97.5 cu in) turbocharged I4 | 7-speed DCT (dry) | 180 PS (132 kW; 178 hp) @ 5,500 rpm | 27 kg⋅m (265 N⋅m; 195 lbf⋅ft) @ 1,500–4,000 rpm | | |
| Smartstream G2.0 MPi | 2021–present | 1,999 cc (122.0 cu in) I4 | 6-speed manual | 152 PS (112 kW; 150 hp) @ 6,200 rpm 156 PS (115 kW; 154 hp) @ 6,200 rpm | 19.6 kg⋅m (192 N⋅m; 142 lbf⋅ft) @ 4,500 rpm | 10.9s (FWD); 11.2s (AWD) | 183 km/h (114 mph) |
| Smartstream G2.0 MPi | 2021–present | 1,999 cc (122.0 cu in) I4 | 6-speed automatic | 152 PS (112 kW; 150 hp) @ 6,200 rpm 156 PS (115 kW; 154 hp) @ 6,200 rpm | 19.6 kg⋅m (192 N⋅m; 142 lbf⋅ft) @ 4,500 rpm | 11.7s (FWD); 11.9s (AWD) | 180 km/h (112 mph) |
| Smartstream G2.0 T-GDi | 2021–present | 1,975 cc (120.5 cu in) I4 | 8-speed automatic | 236 PS (174 kW; 233 hp) @ 6,000 rpm | 36.0 kg⋅m (353 N⋅m; 260 lbf⋅ft) @ 1,500-4,000 rpm | | 210 km/h (130 mph) |
| Smartstream G2.5 GDi | 2021–present | 2,497 cc (152.4 cu in) I4 | 8-speed automatic | 190 PS (140 kW; 187 hp) @ 6,100 rpm | 25 kg⋅m (245 N⋅m; 181 lbf⋅ft) @ 4,000 rpm | 9.4s | 197 km/h (122 mph) |
Petrol hybrid
| Smartstream G1.6 T-GDi 48V | 2021–present | 1,598 cc (97.5 cu in) turbocharged I4 | 6-speed manual | 150 PS (110 kW; 148 hp) @ 5,500 rpm | 25.5 kg⋅m (250 N⋅m; 184 lbf⋅ft) @ 1,500–4,000 rpm | 10.3s | 182 km/h (113 mph) |
| Smartstream G1.6 T-GDi 48V | 2021–present | 1,598 cc (97.5 cu in) turbocharged I4 | 7-speed DCT (dry) | 150 PS (110 kW; 148 hp) @ 5,500 rpm | 25.5 kg⋅m (250 N⋅m; 184 lbf⋅ft) @ 1,500–4,000 rpm | 9.7s (FWD); 9.8s (AWD) | 188 km/h (117 mph) |
| Smartstream G1.6 T-GDi Hybrid | 2021–present | 1,598 cc (97.5 cu in) turbocharged I4 | 6-speed automatic | 230 PS (169 kW; 227 hp) @ 5,500 rpm | 35.7 kg⋅m (350 N⋅m; 258 lbf⋅ft) @ 1,500–4,500 rpm | 8.0s (FWD); 8.3s (AWD) | 193 km/h (120 mph) |
| Smartstream G1.6 T-GDi Plug-in Hybrid | 2021–present | 1,598 cc (97.5 cu in) turbocharged I4 | 6-speed automatic | 265 PS (195 kW; 261 hp) @ 5,500 rpm | 35.7 kg⋅m (350 N⋅m; 258 lbf⋅ft) @ 1,500–4,500 rpm | 8.2s (AWD) | 192 km/h (119 mph) |
LPG
| Smartstream L2.0 LPi | 2022–present | 1,999 cc (122.0 cu in) I4 | 6-speed automatic | 146 PS (107 kW; 144 hp) @ 6,000 rpm | 19.5 kg⋅m (191 N⋅m; 141 lbf⋅ft) @ 4,200 rpm | | |
Diesel
| Smartstream D1.6 CRDi | 2021–present | 1,598 cc (97.5 cu in) turbocharged I4 | 6-speed manual | 115 PS (85 kW; 113 hp) @ 4,000 rpm | 28.6 kg⋅m (280 N⋅m; 207 lbf⋅ft) @ 1,500–2,750 rpm | 12.1s | 175 km/h (109 mph) |
| Smartstream D1.6 CRDi | 2021–present | 1,598 cc (97.5 cu in) turbocharged I4 | 7-speed DCT (dry) | 136 PS (100 kW; 134 hp) @ 4,000 rpm | 32.6 kg⋅m (320 N⋅m; 236 lbf⋅ft) @ 2,000–2,250 rpm | 11.4s (FWD); 11.6s (AWD) | 180 km/h (112 mph) |
| Smartstream D2.0 CRDi | 2021–present | 1,998 cc (121.9 cu in) turbocharged I4 | 8-speed automatic | 186 PS (137 kW; 183 hp) @ 4,000 rpm | 42.5 kg⋅m (417 N⋅m; 307 lbf⋅ft) @ 2,000–2,750 rpm | | |

=== Safety ===
ANCAP test results Kia Sportage all variants (2022, aligned with Euro NCAP)
| Test | Points | % |
|---|---|---|
| Overall: | 5 /5 stars | |
| Adult occupant: | 33.43 | 87% |
| Child occupant: | 42.73 | 87% |
| Pedestrian: | 36.10 | 66% |
| Safety assist: | 11.90 | 74% |

Euro NCAP test results Kia Sportage (2022)
| Test | Points | % |
|---|---|---|
| Overall: | 5 /5 stars | |
| Adult occupant: | 33.4 | 87% |
| Child occupant: | 42.5 | 86% |
| Pedestrian: | 36.1 | 66% |
| Safety assist: | 11.6 | 72% |

IIHS scores
| Small overlap front (Driver) | Good | | |
| Small overlap front (Passenger) | Good | | |
| Moderate overlap front | Good | | |
| Side (original test) | Good | | |
| Roof strength | Good | | |
| Head restraints and seats | Good | | |
| Headlights | Acceptable | Poor | varies by trim/option |
| Front crash prevention: vehicle-to-vehicle | Superior | | optional |
| Front crash prevention: vehicle-to-vehicle | Superior | | standard |
| Front crash prevention: vehicle-to-pedestrian (Day) | Superior | | optional |
| Front crash prevention: vehicle-to-pedestrian (Day) | Superior | | standard |
| Child seat anchors (LATCH) ease of use | Acceptable | | |

Latin NCAP 3.0 test results Kia Sportage + 6 Airbags (2022, similar to Euro NCAP 2014)
| Test | Points | % |
|---|---|---|
| Overall: | 3 /5 stars | |
| Adult occupant: | 32.92 | 82% |
| Child occupant: | 35.07 | 72% |
| Pedestrian: | 22.82 | 48% |
| Safety assist: | 24.00 | 56% |

Latin NCAP 3.5 test results Kia Sportage + 6 Airbags (2025, similar to Euro NCAP 2017)
| Test | Points | % |
|---|---|---|
| Overall: | 5 /5 stars | |
| Adult occupant: | 35.92 | 90% |
| Child occupant: | 45.00 | 92% |
| Pedestrian: | 34.05 | 71% |
| Safety assist: | 42.23 | 98% |

TNCAP (2.0) test result Kia Sportage 'Apex' (2026, similar to Euro NCAP 2022)
| Test | Points | % |
|---|---|---|
| Overall: | 2/5 stars | |
| Adult occupant: | 27.931 | 73% |
| Child occupant: | 25.371 | 51% |
| Pedestrian: | 33.32 | 69% |
| Safety assist: | 7.811 | 52% |

=== Awards ===
In 2022, the Sportage won the 'Family SUV' and 'Full Hybrid' categories in the Scottish Car of the Year Awards. In 2023, the Sportage was chosen as Car of the Year in Morocco.

== Sales ==
The Sportage was Kia's best selling model worldwide in 2016, overtaking the Rio.

| Calendar year | US | Canada | Mexico | Brazil | South Korea | China | | | Europe (Note: Europe: 2020 EU 27 + UK + Switzerland + Norway + Iceland) | Turkey | Australia | Malaysia (Note: Figures based on registration (Malaysia)) | | Global |
| Calendar year | US | Canada | Mexico | Brazil | South Korea | Sportage | Sportage R | KX5 | Europe | Turkey | Australia | Kia Sportage | Naza Sportage | Global |
|---|---|---|---|---|---|---|---|---|---|---|---|---|---|---|
| 1998 | 28,582 | | | | | | | | 5,830 | | | | | |
| 1999 | 52,383 | | | | | | | | 13,133 | | | | | |
| 2000 | 62,350 | | | | 2,506 | | | | 18,320 | | | 139 | | |
| 2001 | 52,369 | | | | 2,922 | | | | 13,508 | | | 597 | | |
| 2002 | 39,436 | | | | 1,399 | | | | 5,820 | | | 525 | | |
| 2003 | 5,616 | | | 585 | 0 | | | | 2,913 | | | 327 | | |
| 2004 | 121 | | | 178 | 27,559 | | | | 1,394 | | | 202 | | |
| 2005 | 29,009 | | | 184 | 57,031 | | | | 38,631 | | | 378 | | |
| 2006 | 37,071 | | | 281 | 35,867 | | | | 32,147 | | | 263 | 1 | |
| 2007 | 49,393 | | | 2,180 | 32,563 | 5,713 | | | 32,076 | | | 222 | 7 | |
| 2008 | 32,754 | | | 7,106 | 23,974 | 32,500 | | | 26,372 | | | 317 | 0 | |
| 2009 | 42,509 | | | 7,900 | 27,874 | 43,828 | | | 22,687 | | | 637 | | |
| 2010 | 23,873 | | | 7,436 | 44,770 | 67,740 | 11,713 | | 29,219 | | | 143 | | |
| 2011 | 47,463 | | | 8,376 | 52,018 | 44,754 | 64,341 | | 67,623 | | | 641 | | |
| 2012 | 36,357 | 8,107 | | 9,137 | 43,993 | 41,182 | 75,969 | | 83,023 | | 4,260 | 1,643 | | 359,742 |
| 2013 | 32,965 | 6,935 | | 9,440 | 29,168 | 44,952 | 88,285 | | 90,342 | | | 1,408 | | |
| 2014 | 42,945 | 6,025 | | 10,381 | 47,729 | 40,474 | 96,472 | | 96,556 | | | 1,192 | | |
| 2015 | 53,739 | 6,509 | 5,875 | 6,893 | 52,748 | 29,461 | 81,522 | | 104,984 | | | 541 | | 399,969 |
| 2016 | 81,066 | 11,410 | 18,772 | 4,505 | 49,877 | 9,302 | 78,176 | 62,254 | 138,218 | | | 615 | | 515,067 |
| 2017 | 72,824 | 13,284 | 20,278 | 3,639 | 42,232 | | 32,514 | 20,641 | 129,595 | | | 703 | | |
| 2018 | 82,823 | 12,210 | 18,864 | 5,648 | 37,373 | 13,873 | 75,180 | 5,951 | 121,197 | | 14,042 | 414 | | 501,367 |
| 2019 | 89,278 | 12,637 | 15,876 | 4,083 | 28,271 | | 85,708 | 8,703 | 110,514 | | 13,645 | 237 | | |
| 2020 | 84,343 | 11,789 | 8,168 | 1,625 | 18,425 | | 68,750 | 11,285 | 69,016 | | 9,579 | 46 | | 366,929 |
| 2021 | 94,601 | 11,837 | 8,372 | 1,192 | 39,762 | | 31,751 | 2,445 | 85,509 | | 7,949 | 0 | | 363,630 |
| 2022 | 125,245 | | 1,975 | 872 | 55,394 | 19,586 | | 1,243 | 140,327 | 3,404 | 18,792 | 2 | | 452,068 |
| 2023 | 140,780 | | 6,855 | 1,064 | 69,749 | 9,680 | | 695 | 202,303 | | 15,747 | 2 | | 523,502 |
| 2024 | 161,917 | 15,423 | 6,846 | 1,127 | 74,255 | 11,136 | | — | 221,917 | | 22,210 | 20 | | 587,717 |
| 2025 | 182,823 | 23,906 | | | | 8,729 | | — | | | 19,137 | | | |
