= Subaru Legacy (fourth generation) =

Fourth generation of Subaru Legacy

Legacy BL-BP series
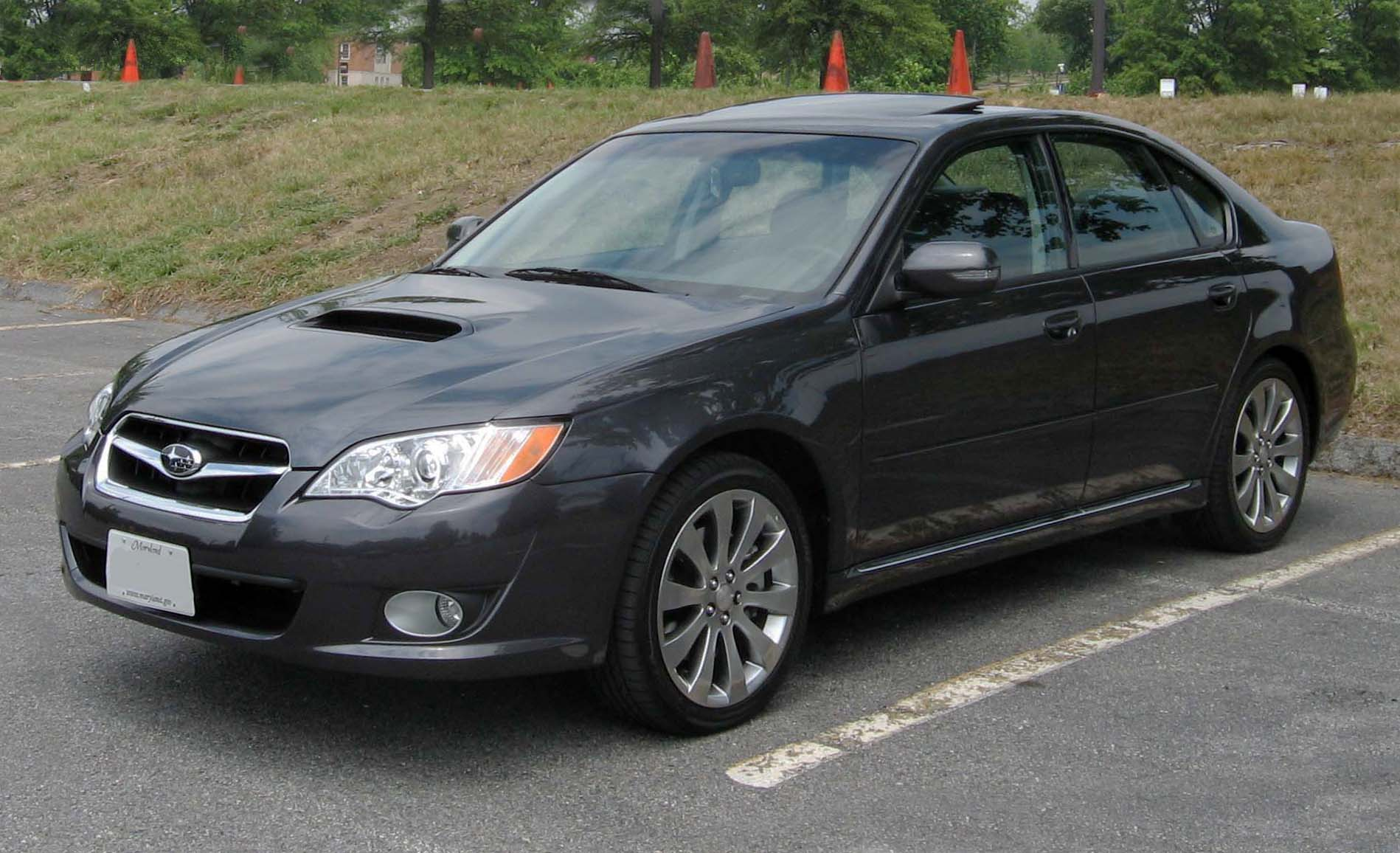

Overview
- Manufacturer: Subaru (Fuji Heavy Industries)
- Model code: BL/BP
- Also called: Subaru Liberty (Australia)
- Production: 2003–2009
- Model years: 2005–2009 (sedan); 2005–2007 (wagon)
- Designer: Toru Ozeki (exterior: 2000); Hiroyuki Kobayashi (exterior: 2000); Fumio Wakao (chief exterior designer: 1999-2004); Ken Nakao (exterior clay modeler: 2000-01); Tadan Sugiyama (interior: 2000); Hiroki Kimura (colors & trim: 2001-04) Hiroshi Ishikawa (interior design director: 1999-2004); Tetsuya Jiroubou (chief designer BL/BP)

Body and chassis
- Body style: 4-door "B" pillar hardtop Sedan; 5-door "B" pillar hardtop station wagon
- Layout: All-wheel drive
- Related: Subaru Outback; Subaru Tribeca; Subaru Exiga

Powertrain
- Engine: 2.0L SOHC EJ20 H4 2.0L DOHC EJ20 H4; 2.0L DOHC Turbo EJ20 H4; 2.0L DOHC Turbodiesel EE20 H4; 2.5L SOHC EJ253 H4; 2.5L DOHC Turbo EJ255 H4 3.0L EZ30 DOHC H6
- Transmission: 4-speed automatic 5-speed automatic 5-speed manual 6-speed manual

Dimensions
- Wheelbase: 2,670 mm (105.1 in)
- Length: 4,699 mm (185.0 in) (sedan); 4,793 mm (188.7 in) (wagon); 4,796 mm (188.8 in) (2008–2009)
- Width: 1,730 mm (68.1 in)
- Height: 1,480 mm (58.1 in) (wagon); 1,420 mm (56.1 in) (sedan); 1,440 mm (56.5 in) (Spec.B Sedan)
- Curb weight: 1,300–1,500 kg (2,900–3,200 lb)

Chronology
- Predecessor: Subaru Legacy (third generation)
- Successor: Subaru Legacy (fifth generation)

The fourth generation of the Subaru Legacy was introduced in 2003 and saw a complete redesign of the Legacy on an all-new platform. Development began by the beginning of 1999, with styling freeze in early 2001 and engineering sign-off in 2003.

== Japanese model ==
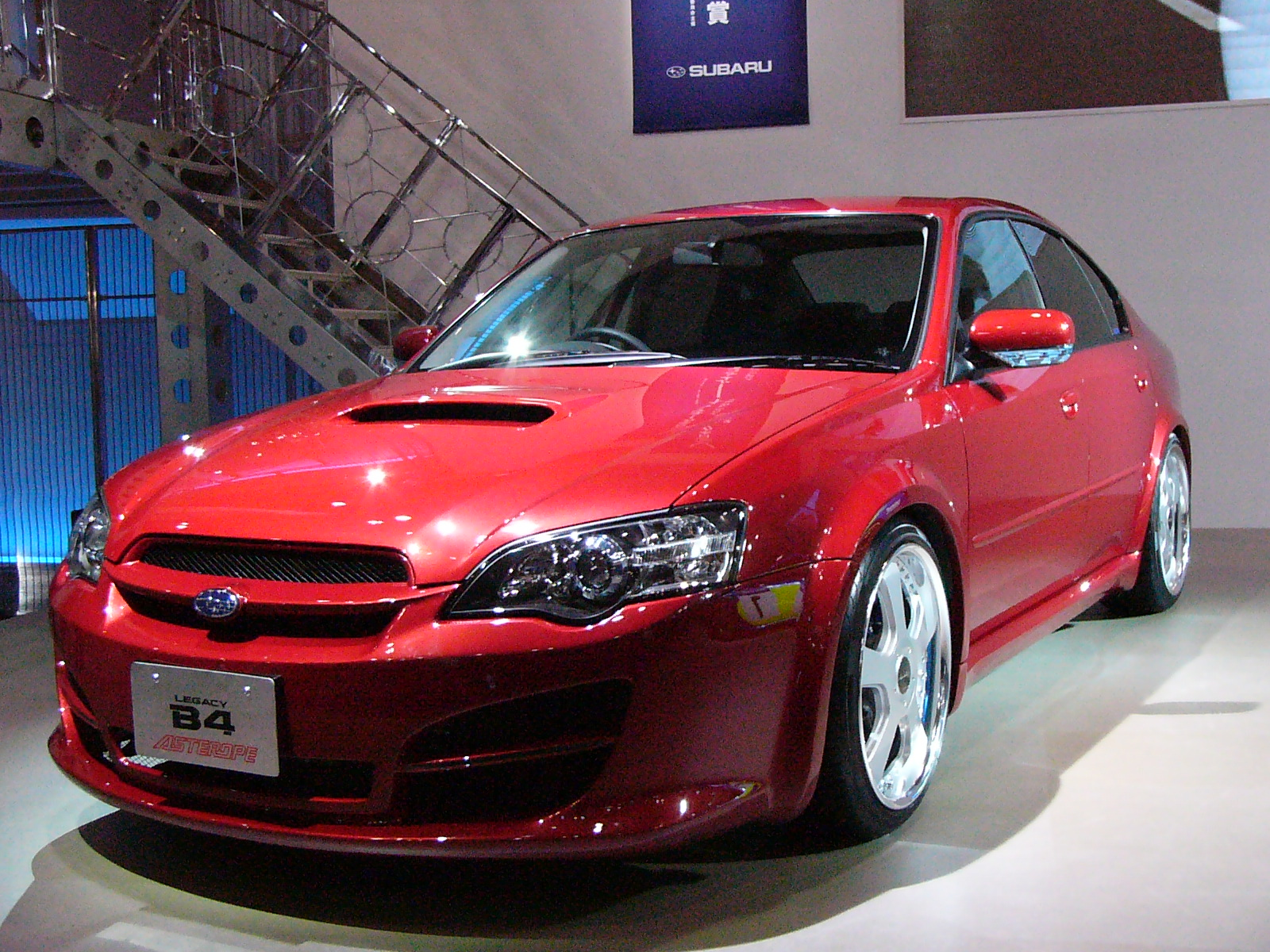
Subaru Legacy B4 GT Asterope concept

On May 23, 2003, Fuji Heavy Industries continued to offer the "Blitzen" model in Japan only, and debuted the fourth generation Legacy B4 sedan for the Japanese domestic market with the slogan "Blood type: B4" and advertisements featuring a remixed version of "Gymnopédie No. 1" by Erik Satie. The station wagon debuted with the slogan Grand Touring Speciality and the song in the advertisements was "Finding Beauty" composed by Scottish composer Craig Armstrong from his second independent album As If to Nothing. The Legacy B4 sedan and station wagon was voted the 2003–2004 Japan Car of the Year, Subaru's first win for the award after fighting off stiff competition from Toyota Prius and Mazda RX-8. In 2005 Bruce Willis returned as a spokesman for the second time after the first generation in 1991 to 1993 with tagline I feel LEGACY. Blitzen was a special package above the standard Legacy vehicles, and all Blitzen models were identified with the "B4" branding.

Starting with this generation, Subaru installed an electroluminescent instrument cluster which lights up when the engine is started, regardless if the exterior lights are on.

For the home market, the Legacy B4 and Touring Wagon were offered in 2.0i, 2.0R, 2.0GT, 2.0GT spec.B, 3.0R, and 3.0R spec.B trim levels. The base model 2.0i has SOHC version of EJ20 engine producing 140 PS, and the 2.0R comes with 165 PS DOHC engine. The turbocharged EJ20 DOHC engine installed in the 2.0GT and 2.0GT spec.B producing 280 PS Due to advancements in turbocharger technology and tightening emission standards, the twin-turbo setup was replaced by a twin scroll turbo and AVCS. The 3.0R and 3.0R spec.B are powered by the new 250 PS 6-cylinder EZ30 engine.

To commemorate Subaru's 50 years of making automobiles and The First Japan Car of the Year Victory, the 50th Anniversary Legacy was released in January 2004. This special edition model was based on the Legacy 2.0R, and 2.0GT.

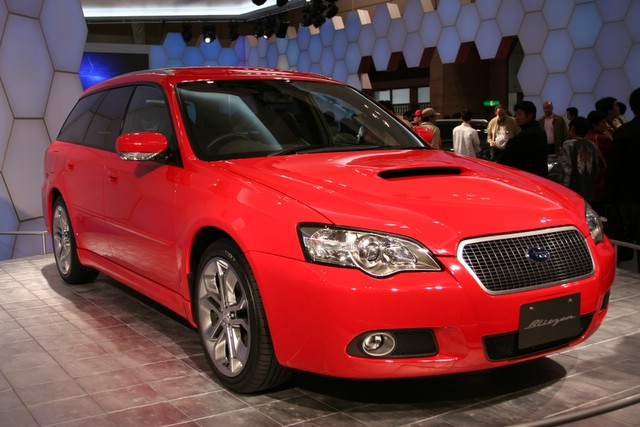
Subaru Legacy Blitzen Touring Wagon

The Legacy Blitzen of December 2004 is the special edition based on the 2.0GT B4 and Touring Wagon. These high-performance sports models came with special color bright red, sports suspension, 18-inch alloys, unique grille, and aero-style bumpers.

Based on the Legacy 2.0GT spec.B B4 and Touring Wagon, the WR-Limited 2004 was released in July 2004, and the 2.0GT-based WR-Limited 2005 was launched in August 2005. The WR-Limited models were painted in WR Blue Mica, and came with Gold alloy wheels, front under spoiler, special blue and black seats, and special emblems.

Also added to the Japanese line-up in August 2005 was the Legacy 2.0GT spec.B tuned by STI. This sports model has Bilstein suspension, 5-speed for 2005 or 6-speed manual for models after 2006, STI genome exhaust, Brembo brakes (4-piston front, 2-piston rear) and 18-inch alloy wheels by STI.

=== Facelift model (2006–08) ===
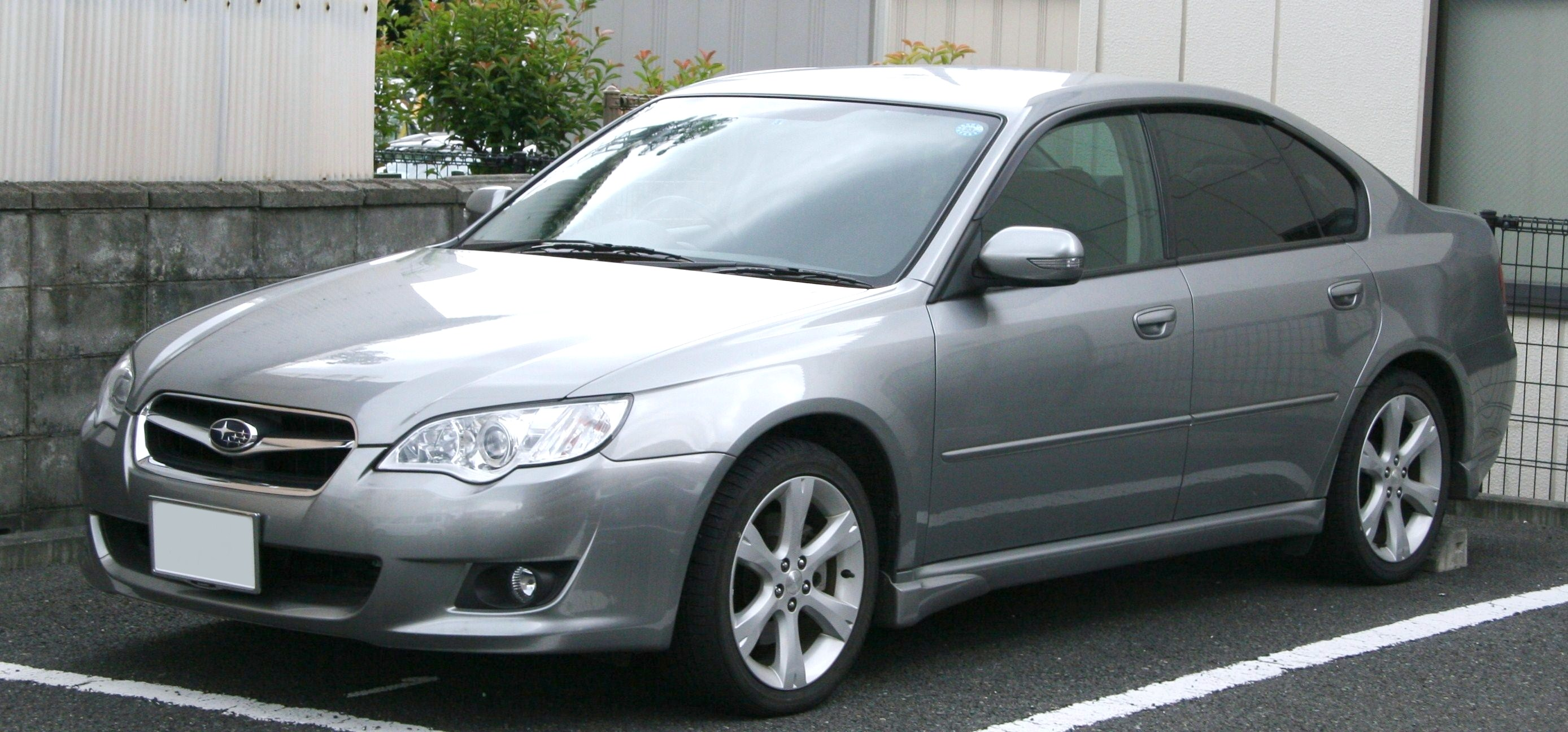
The facelifted Subaru Legacy B4 2.0R (Japan)

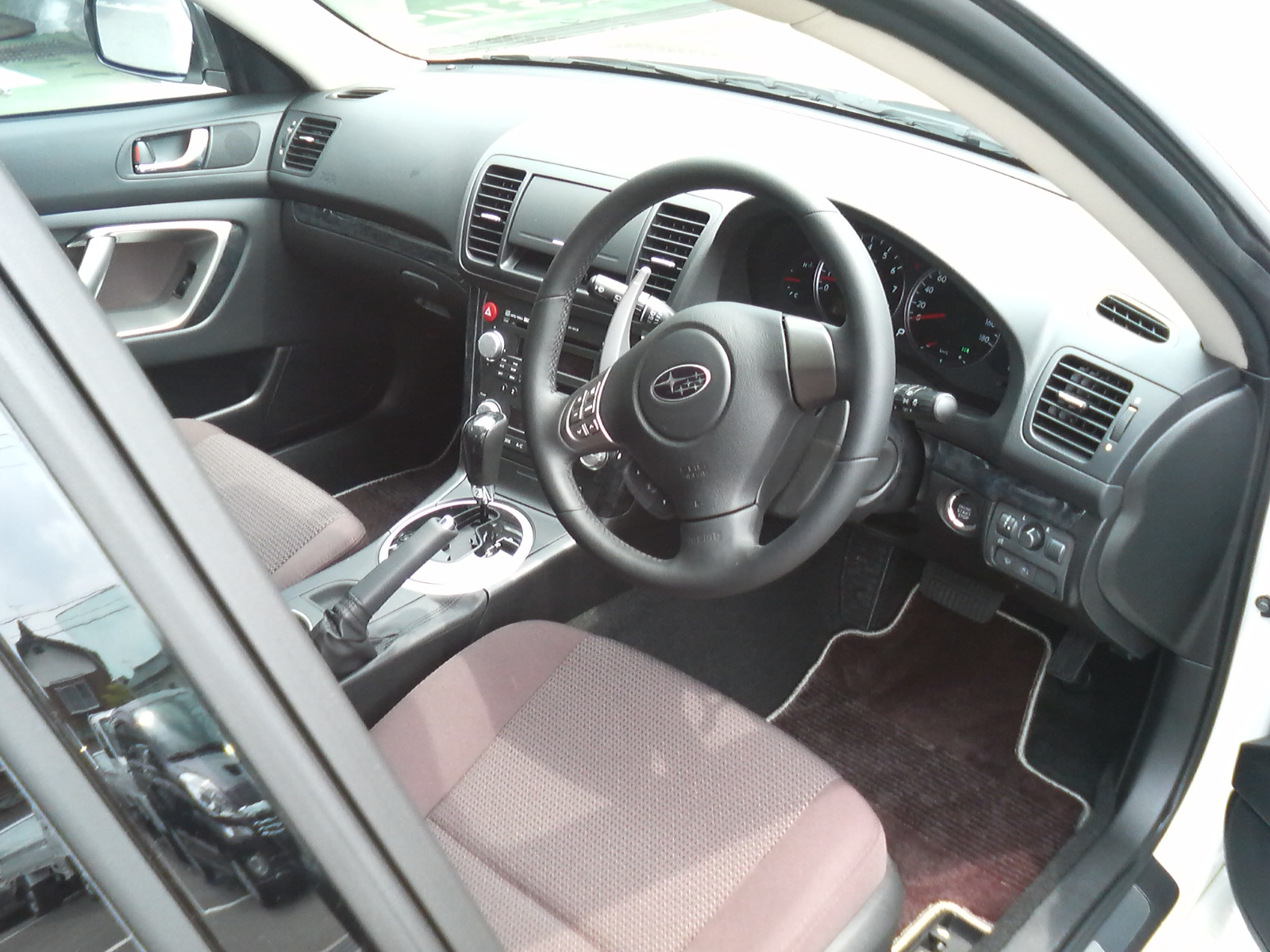
Interior

The Japanese Legacy received a cosmetic update in May 2006. Notable changes included new bumpers, headlights, front fenders, grille, and rear combination lamps. This facelift trickled down to export models in 2007.

Kazuyoshi Miura was used as a spokesman for the Hardtop, Touring Wagon and Outback and the commercial song were from Japanese rock band L'Arc-en-Ciel.

Although model grades remained largely unchanged, the number of option packages available for certain grades reduced. The base model 2.0i Touring Wagon could also be ordered as the Casual Selection model. Urban Selection models were added to the 2.0R, 2.0GT, and 2.0GT SI-Cruise. The 2.0R was also offered as B-Sports Limited version.

=== EyeSight (2008–09) ===
On May 8, 2008, Subaru announced the EyeSight models for Japanese market. It consists of 2 CCD cameras with one on each side of the rear-view mirror, that use human-like stereoscopic vision to judge distances and generally keep tabs on the driver. The system included the ability to help the driver maintain distance on the highway, a lane departure warning system, a wake up call alerting the driver to a change in traffic signals, and pedestrian detection. SI-Cruise has been integrated into the EyeSight feature as a driver safety aid. EyeSight was a new brand name for a safety system Subaru had previously introduced in Japan only in the 1999 Subaru Lancaster (Outback) called Active Driving Assist (ADA)

EyeSight models were available for Touring Wagon 2.0GT and 3.0R, B4 3.0R, Outback 3.0R. All EyeSight models include Sportshift E-5AT transmission.

=== STI S402 (DBA-BL9/DBA-BP9) (2008–2009) ===
The Legacy STI S402 is a limited edition (402 units) high-performance series for the Japanese market. It includes a 2.5L twin scroll turbocharged engine rated at 285 PS (210 kW; 281 hp) at 5,600 rpm and 392 N⋅m (289 lb⋅ft) of torque at 2,000–4,800 rpm, as well as Bilstein shocks, 18x8-inch BBS forged wheels (from S203, S204) with Bridgestone Potenza RE050A 235/40R18 91W tires, Brembo 6-piston front and 2-piston rear brake calipers (from Subaru Impreza type RA-R) and Vehicle Dynamic Control stability control. A special serial number plate is added to the center console and engine bay VIN plate.

Variable valve timing was added and the ECU was updated to improve acceleration.

The S402 was available in sedan and wagon bodies.

== North American model ==
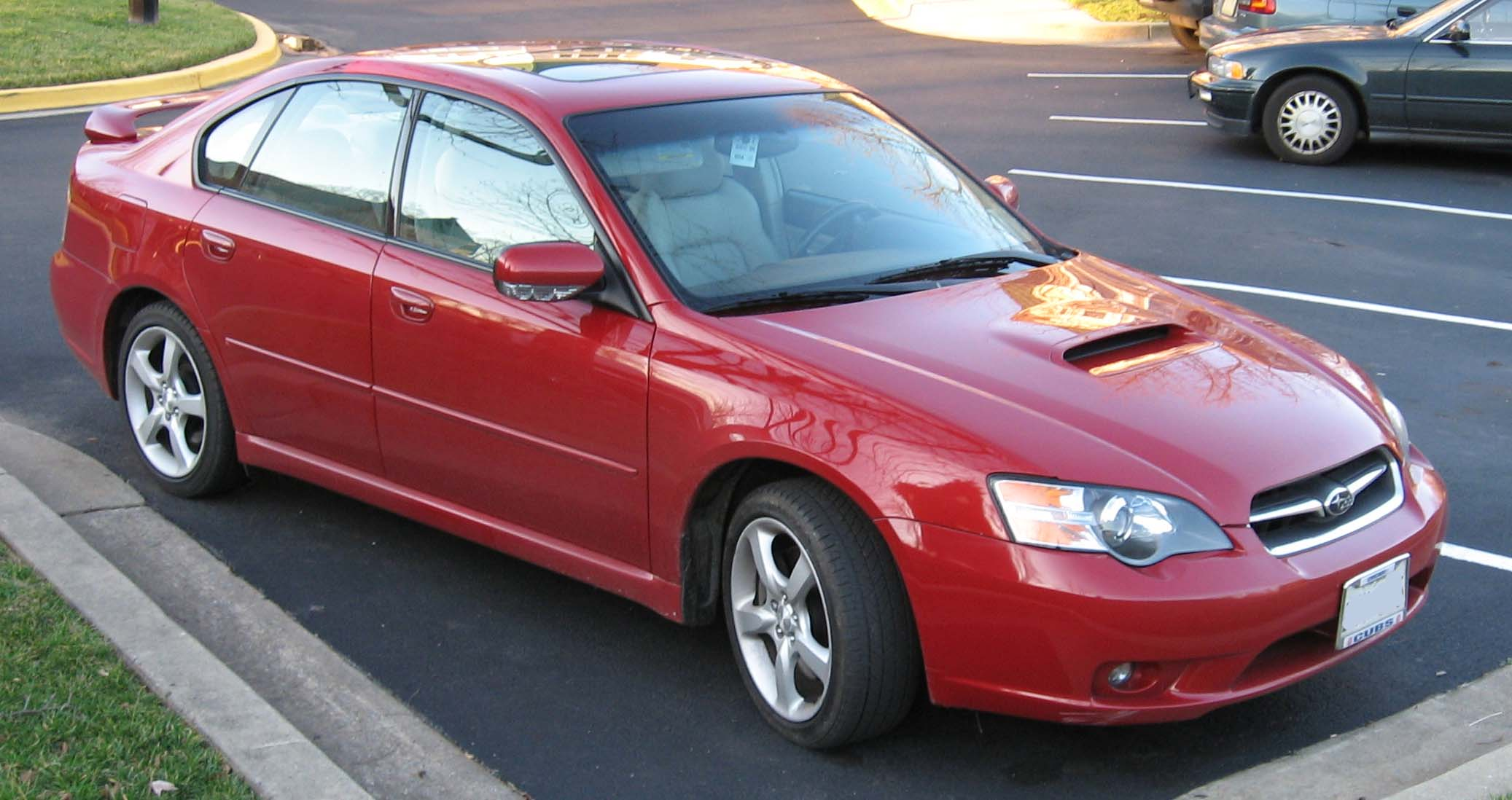
2005–2007 Subaru Legacy 2.5GT Limited Sedan

Subaru of America commenced production of the Legacy BL and BP in January 2004 for the United States and Canadian markets. Lance Armstrong was used as a spokesman for both the sedan and station wagon, and Sheryl Crow sang her 1996 hit "Everyday Is a Winding Road" in USA market commercials. The Lafayette Factory-built Subaru Legacy won 2005 International Car of the Year for Most Dependable/Sedan from Road & Travel Magazine, 2005 Automobile All-Stars for All-Star Family Car from Automobile Magazine and The 2006 International Engine of the Year Award in the 2.0 liter to 2.5 liter category for EJ255 engine.

The model marked the return of a turbocharged engine to the North American Legacy, featuring a new turbocharger from IHI coded the VF40, a single scroll turbo which was replaced in 2007 with a VF46 turbo which was slightly better flow with less turbo spool time, and the EJ255 (Years 2005 to 2006 used the EJ257 including the EJ257 heads but kept the EJ255 code) rated at 250 hp (186 kW), a 2.5-liter unit derived from that of the USDM Impreza WRX with 20 hp (15 kW) more. Due to advancements in turbocharger technology and tightening emission standards, the twin-turbo setup was not used. Turbocharged models, along with the H6 engine, offered Subaru's first 5-speed automatic transmission, featuring SportShift technology licensed from Prodrive, Ltd. The suspension continued to offer the MacPherson struts under the front and multi-link rear Chapman strut arrangement.

The 2005 model year Legacy was offered in 2.5i, 2.5i Limited, 2.5GT, and 2.5GT Limited. All trim levels were available as Sedan and Wagon. The wagon body shared the roof sheet metal with the Outback model that had raised metal "humps" under the roof rails, unlike the Japanese and European wagons that had a sleeker roof. Another difference from other overseas markets was that both sedans and wagons had longer front and rear bumpers, designed to meet the Canadian 5-mph bumper specification.

For 2006, the regular GT was dropped, and the 2.5i Special Edition was added into the line up. The manual transmission was also discontinued for the station wagon. Priced between the base and the Limited models, the 2.5i Special Edition came with a power moonroof and power driver seat, while the 2.5i Limited also came with leather interior, power front passenger seat, and climate control automatic air condition.

The high-performance Subaru Legacy 2.5GT spec.B arrived as a 500-unit limited-edition model for the 2006 model year, and became a regular model for the next following years. It has Bilstein shock absorbers and 18-inch alloy wheels for better handling, Vehicle Dynamics Control, and from 2007, 6-speed manual gearbox and the Subaru Intelligent Drive (SI-Drive) with three modes: Intelligent, Sport, and Sport Sharp. The 2.5GT spec.B model is only available as a sedan and not a station wagon.

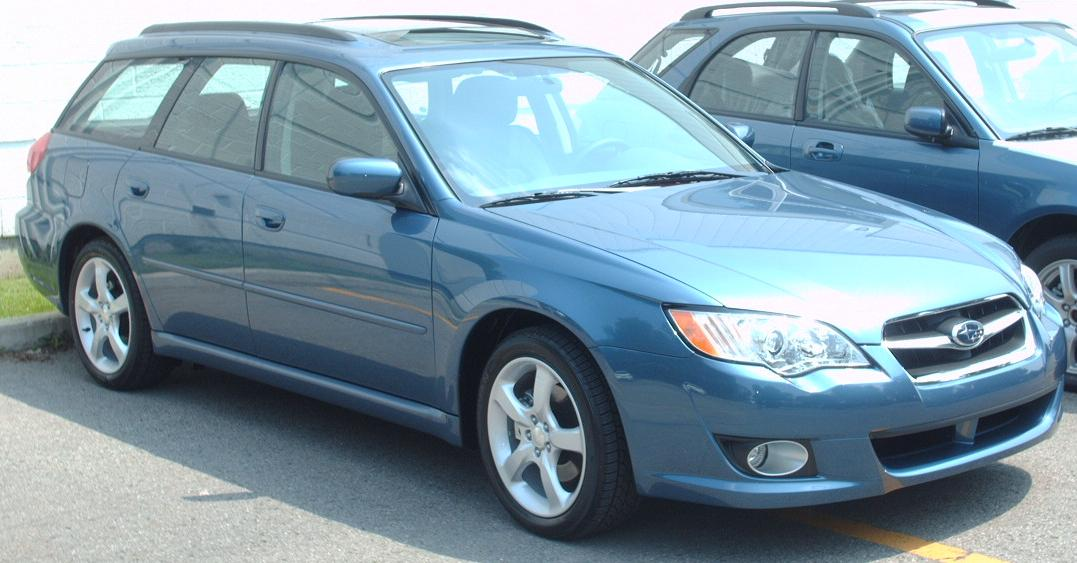
2008 Subaru Legacy 2.5i Wagon (Canada)

For the 2008 model year, the Legacy sedan received facelift with new bumpers, front fenders, tail lights, and alloy wheels. By this time the Legacy wagon and Outback sedan were discontinued, leaving only the Legacy sedan and Outback wagon, though the wagon was not discontinued in Canada. 2008 also brought the 3.0 L EZ30 flat-6 engine to the North American Legacy sedan in the 3.0R Limited trim level. The flat-6 has been available in the Outback wagon and sedan since 2000. For 2008, the 2.5i USA model has been certified PZEV emissions, and a badge has been attached to the rear of the vehicle on the bottom right hand side of the trunklid or tailgate. All other models are certified LEV2. The PZEV Legacy is available for sale in all 50 states, unlike other manufacturers, who only sell PZEV certified vehicles in states that have adopted California emission standards.

== European model ==
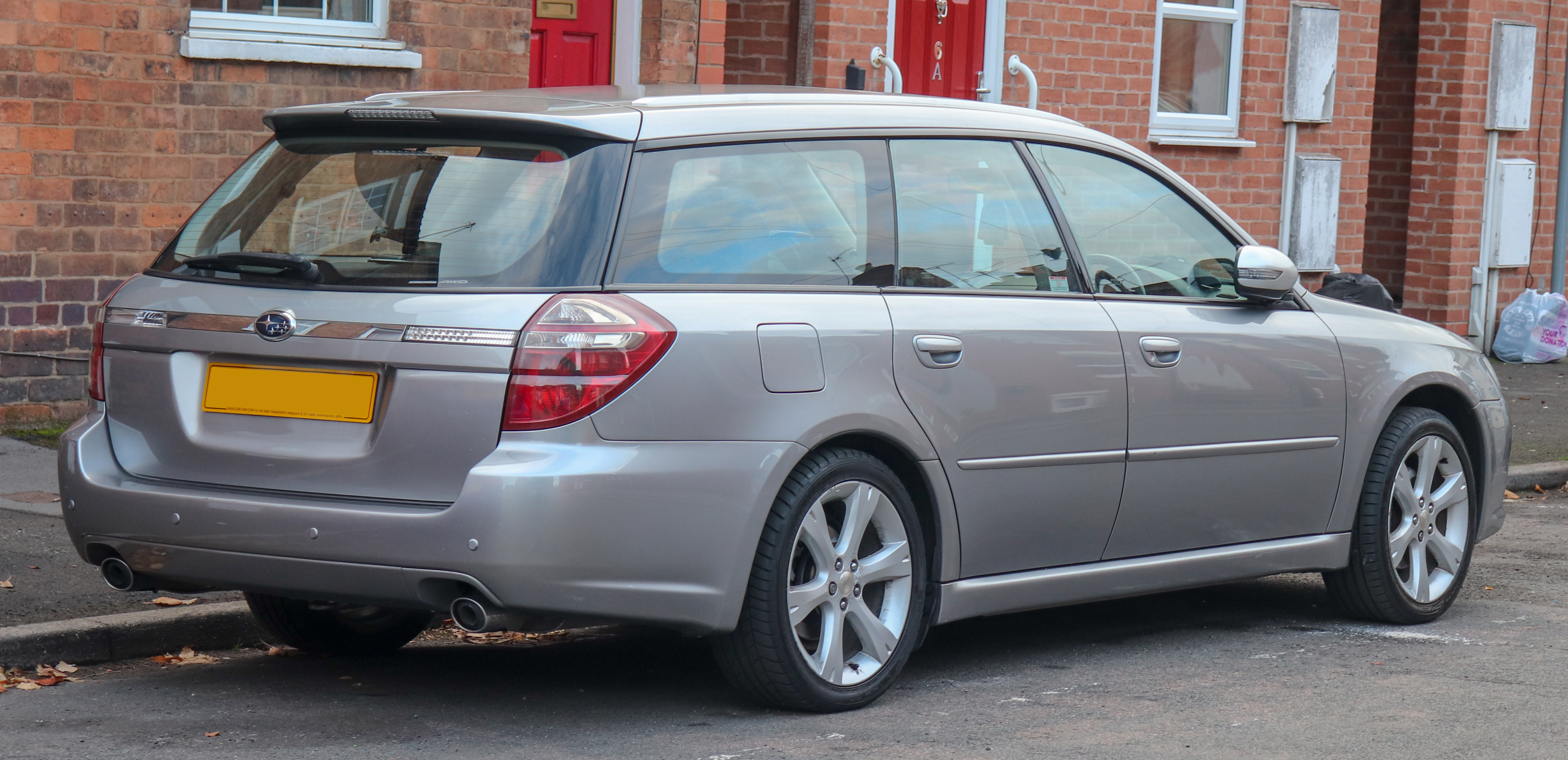
Subaru Legacy Sports Tourer (United Kingdom)

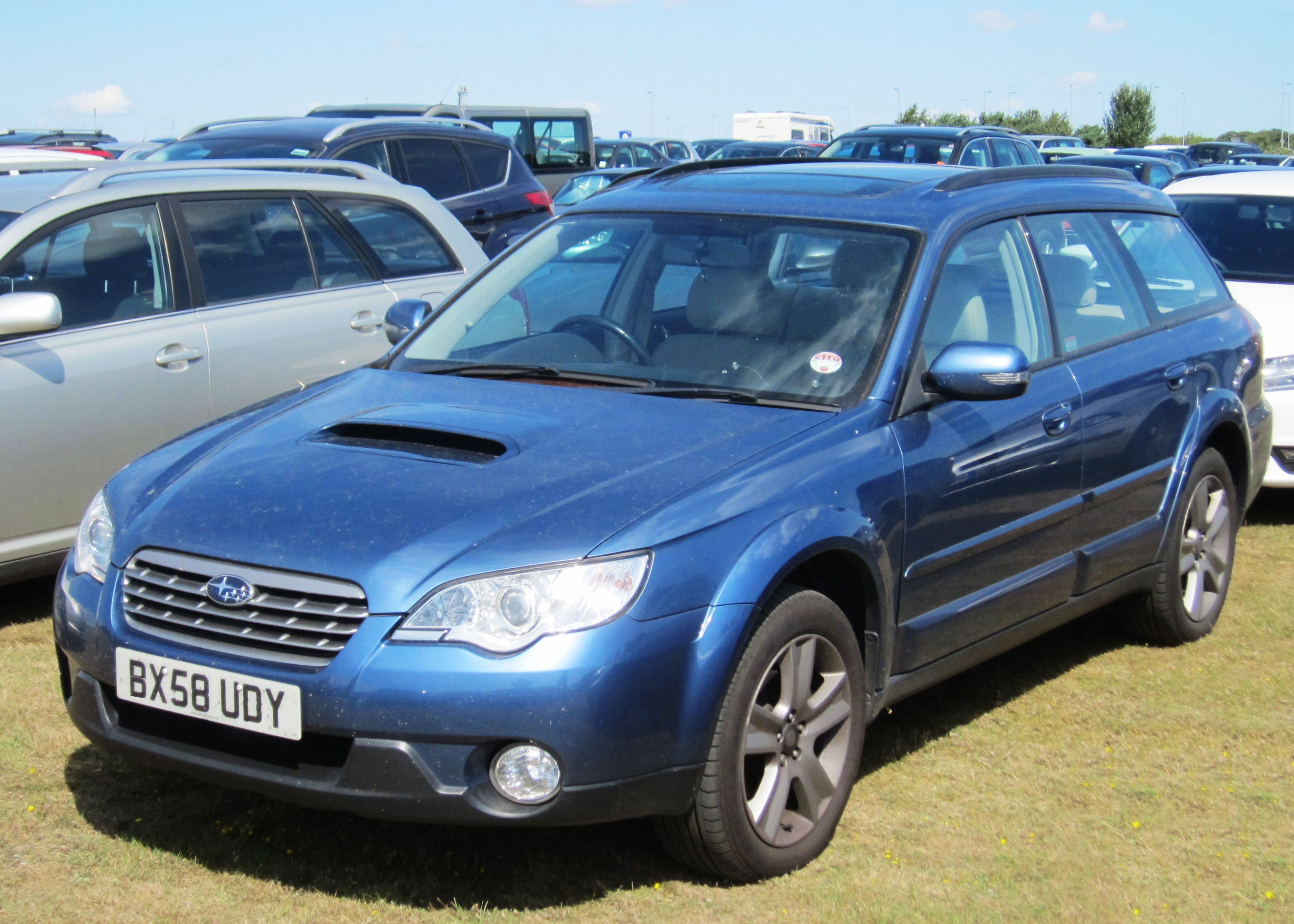
Subaru Outback 1998cc diesel (United Kingdom)

=== Ecomatic Autogas Hybrid (2007–2009) ===
The Ecomatic Autogas Hybrid is a version of the Legacy with the 2.0R or 2.5i engine that can run on LPG for the German market.

=== Diesel (2008–2009) ===
The Subaru EE flat-4 diesel engine is offered in both the Legacy and Outback sedan and wagon; identified as the Subaru Legacy 2.0D, the vehicle was released in the EU starting March 2008. The vehicle is offered with a 5-speed manual transmission only.

The official introduction of the Legacy and Outback diesel was at the Geneva Motor Show in March, 2008.

== Australian model ==
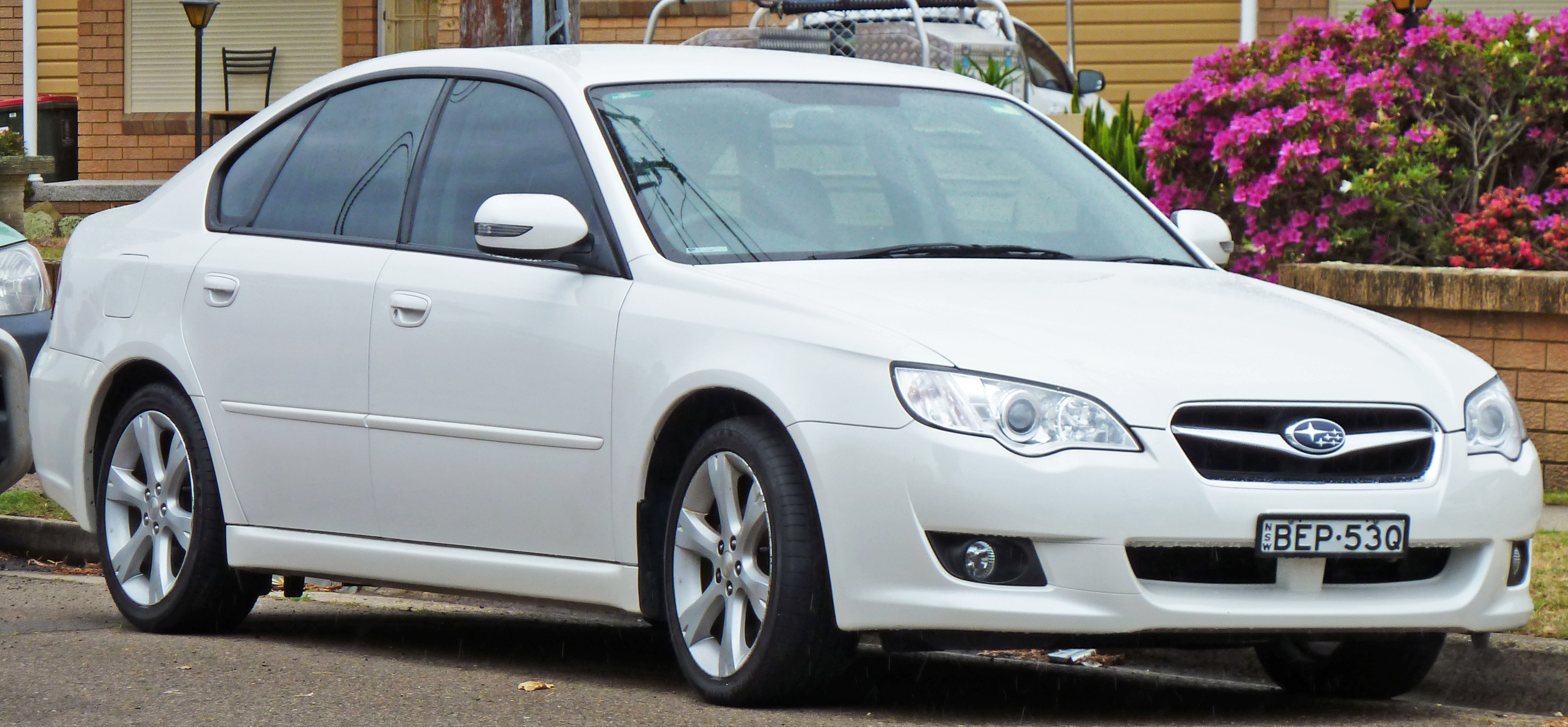

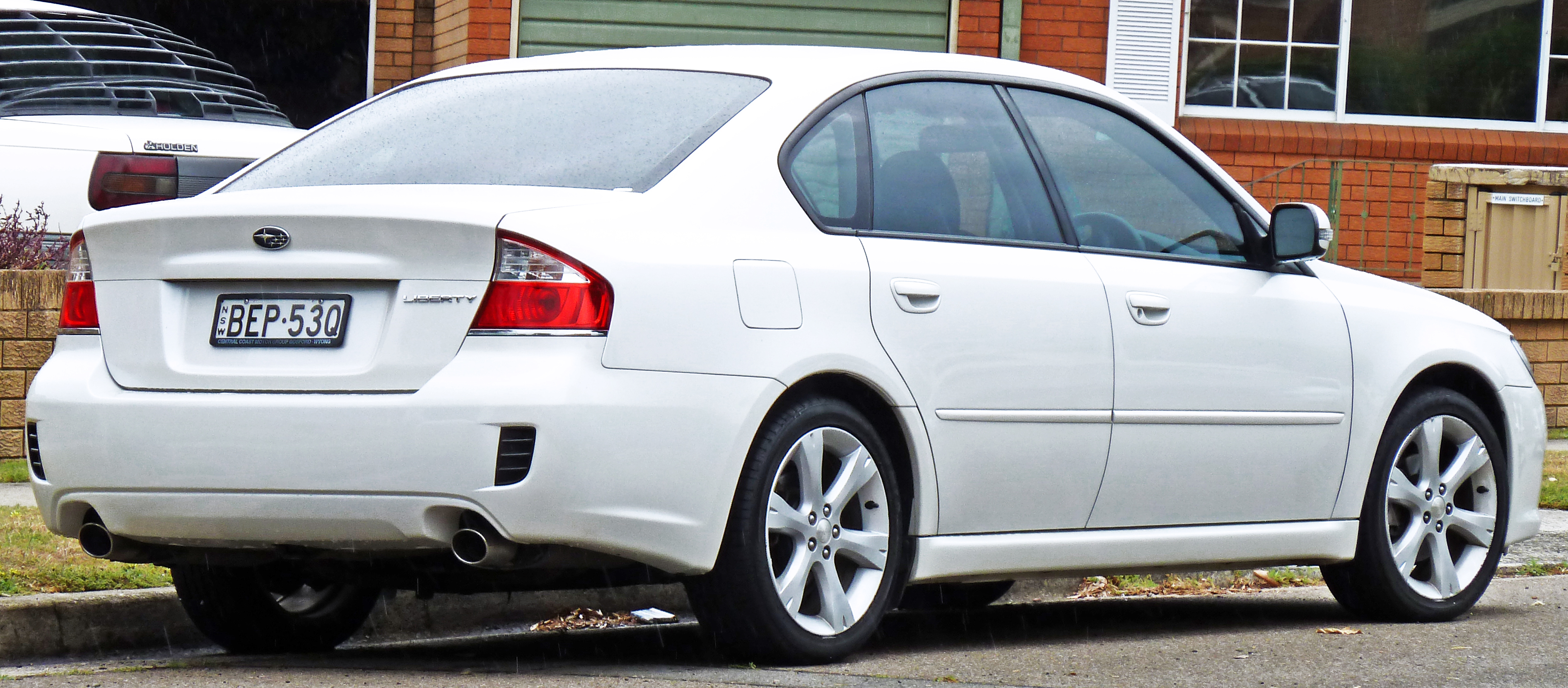
2006–2009 Subaru Liberty sedan

The Liberty BL (sedan) and BP (wagon) were offered in Australia from 2004. Initially the model grades were 2.0i, 2.5i, 2.0GT, 3.0R, and 3.0R spec.B. The 2.5i could also be ordered with Luxury Pack (in-dash CD Player, leather interior, power driver's seat, sunroof, climate control A/C), Safety Pack (dual front side and curtain airbags, sunroof, climate control A/C), or Premium Pack which is the combination of Luxury and Safety Packs. Premium Pack was also offered for the GT. In 2006 the Liberty 2.0i became 2.0R, and the 3.0R spec.B was also available as Blitzen model with sport grille and aero bumpers. For the 2007 model year, the Liberty GT and new GT spec.B received a bigger 2.5-liter turbocharged engine. All models were offered with a manual or auto transmissions.

== Liberty GT tuned by STi (2006–2008) ==
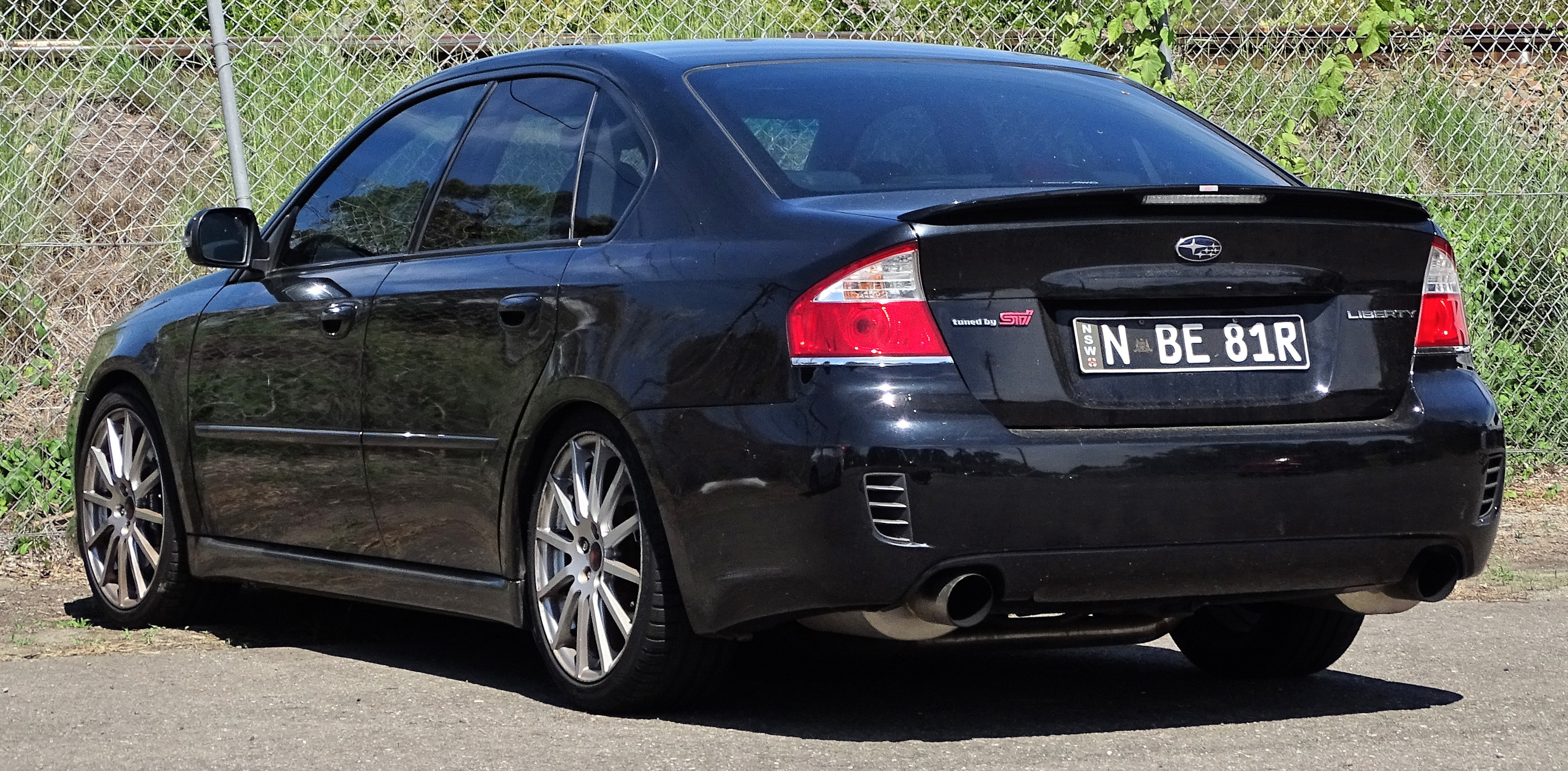
Subaru Liberty GT tuned by STi sedan

In 2006, Subaru released the limited edition "Liberty GT", tuned by STi (TBSTI), based on the 2.0 GT Sedan and Wagon. Only 300 of these were released. The 2007 facelifted version of 300 units were released and powered by the 2.5-liter turbo engine. The 2008 model was limited to 250 units, and has black Brembo brakes and slightly different Enkei rims. The modified EJ255 engine was rated at 264 PS (194 kW; 260 hp) at 6,000 rpm and 350 N⋅m (258 lb⋅ft) of torque at 2,800 rpm. It included Bilstein shocks, a rear suspension kit with partial ball-bearing-jointed bushings, 5 mm (0.2 in) lower springs, Brembo brakes (4-piston front, 2-piston rear) with stainless steel mesh-type brake hose, 18-inch Enkei wheels 2.5 kg (5.5 lb) lighter than stock, front and rear STI spoilers, leather and Alcantara front seats, and an 8-way power driver seat with memory settings.

== Specifications ==
=== Chassis types ===
body styles	sedan	wagon
code	BL	BP

=== Engines ===
Model	Year	Type (code)	Power, torque@rpm
2.0i	2003–2005	2.0L H4 (EJ203)	138 PS (101 kW; 136 hp)
2.0R	2003–2007	1,994 cc (1.994 L; 121.7 cu in) H4 (EJ204) AVCS	165 PS (121 kW; 163 hp)
2.0R	2007–	1,994 cc (1.994 L; 121.7 cu in) H4 (EJ204) AVCS	150 PS (110 kW; 148 hp), 196 N⋅m (145 lb⋅ft)@3200
2.0R (JDM)	2003 - 2009	1,994 cc (1.994 L; 121.7 cu in) H4 (EJ204D) AVCS Manual	190 PS (140 kW; 187 hp)@7100, 196 N⋅m (145 lbf⋅ft)@4400
2.0R (JDM)	2003 - 2009	1,994 cc (1.994 L; 121.7 cu in) H4 (EJ204D) AVCS Auto	180 PS (132 kW; 178 hp)@6800, 196 N⋅m (145 lbf⋅ft)@4400
2.0GT	2003–2008	2.0L H4 turbo (manual)	280 PS (206 kW; 276 hp)@6400, 343 N⋅m (253 lb⋅ft)@2400
2.0GT	2003–2008	2.0L H4 turbo (auto)	260 PS (191 kW; 256 hp)@6400, 343 N⋅m (253 lb⋅ft)@2400
2.5i	2003–2005	2.5L EJ253 H4 / Compression ratio 10,0:1	165 PS (121 kW; 163 hp)@5600, 226 N⋅m (167 lb⋅ft)@4400
2.5i	2007–	2,457 cc (2.457 L; 149.9 cu in) H4 (EJ253)	175 PS (129 kW; 173 hp)@6000, 227 N⋅m (167 lb⋅ft)@4000
2.5GT		2.5L H4 turbo (EJ255)	250 PS (184 kW; 247 hp)@6,000, 330 N⋅m (243 lbf⋅ft)@3,600
3.0R	2003–2009	3,000 cc (3.0 L; 180 cu in) H6 (EZ30)	245 PS (180 kW; 242 hp)@6600, 297 N⋅m (219 lb⋅ft)@4200
2.5GT TBSTi	2007-2008		264 PS (194 kW; 260 hp)@6000, 350 N⋅m (258 lb⋅ft)@2800
STi S402	2008–2009	2,457 cc (2.457 L; 149.9 cu in) H4 AVCS twin scroll turbo (EJ25)	285 PS (210 kW; 281 hp)@5600, 392 N⋅m (289 lb⋅ft)@2000–4800
2.0D		1,998 cc (1.998 L; 121.9 cu in) H4 turbo (EE20)	150 PS (110 kW; 148 hp)@3600, 350 N⋅m (258 lb⋅ft)@1800

The normally aspirated engines were revised for increased power and torque.

=== Transmissions ===
Models	Years	Type (code)
2.0i, 2.0R	MY03-MY09	5-speed manual, 4-speed automatic
2.5i	MY04-MY09	5-speed manual, 4-speed automatic
2.0GT	MY04-MY06	5-speed manual, 5-speed automatic
2.0GT spec.B	MY04-MY06	5-speed manual, 5-speed automatic
2.0GT	MY07-MY09	5-speed manual, 5-speed automatic
2.0GT spec.B	MY07-MY09	6-speed manual, 5-speed automatic
2.5GT	MY07-MY09	5-speed manual, 5-speed automatic
2.5GT spec.B	MY07-MY09	6-speed manual
3.0R	MY03-MY09	5-speed manual, 5-speed automatic, 4-speed automatic MY03-04
3.0R spec.B	MY04-MY09	6 speed manual, 5-speed automatic with paddle shift
Liberty GT tuned by STI	MY06	5-speed manual, 5-speed automatic
Liberty GT tuned by STI	MY07 & MY08	6-speed manual, 5-speed automatic with paddle shift
STI S402	2008–2009	6-speed manual

All models are equipped with electronic drive by wire throttle control.

Manual transmission models have a center differential. Automatic transmission models have an electronically controlled clutch which provides power to the rear wheels.

The Legacy is fitted with MacPherson strut front suspension and multilink rear suspension.

The fuel tank has a capacity of 64 liters (17 US gal). The wagon has 459 liters of trunk space, while the sedan 433. Only in the wagon are there split-folding rear seats, which offer 1,628 liters of trunk space when folded down.

The bonnet, fifth door, steering column and some parts are made of aluminum to reduce weight.

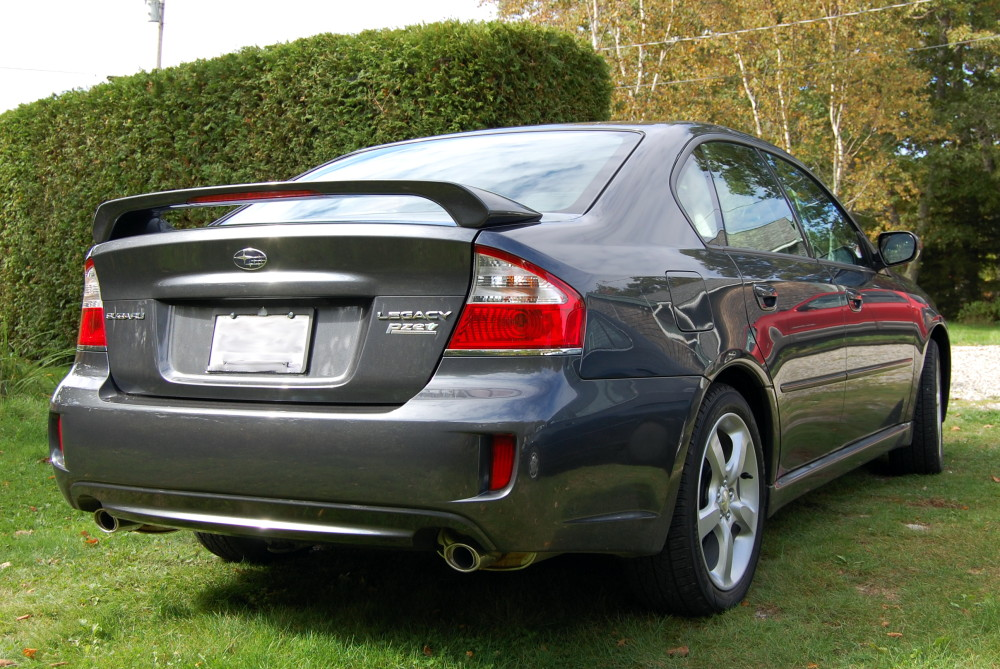
Subaru Legacy 2.5i PZEV sedan rear

All automatic transmission models from MY05 on include Sportshift manual gear selection mode.

MY07-MY09 (both spec.B and non-spec.B) models include Subaru Intelligent Drive (SI-DRIVE), which includes 3 vehicle performance modes with unique settings for the engine control unit (ECU) and transmission control unit (TCU).

=== Safety ===
ANCAP test results Subaru Liberty / Legacy variants with side curtain airbags (2003)
Test	Score
Overall	5 /5 stars
Frontal offset	14.52/16
Side impact	16/16
Pole	2/2
Seat belt reminders	3/3
Whiplash protection	Not Assessed
Pedestrian protection	Adequate
Electronic stability control	Optional

ANCAP test results Subaru Liberty / Legacy variants with dual frontal airbags (2003)
Test	Score
Overall	5 /5 stars
Frontal offset	14.52/16
Side impact	15.05/16
Pole	Not Assessed
Seat belt reminders	3/3
Whiplash protection	Not Assessed
Pedestrian protection	Adequate
Electronic stability control	Optional

== Awards ==
- In 2003 The Hardtop Legacy B4 and Touring Wagon Model was voted the 2003–2004 Japan Car of the Year, Subaru's first win for the award after fighting off stiff competition from Toyota Prius and Mazda RX-8.
- On December 20, 2004, the USDM Legacy B4 was awarded the 2005 Automobile All-Stars for All-Star Family Car from Automobile Magazine Jean Jennings, editor-in-chief of Automobile said "The Legacy B4 beat out the competition because it can be all things to all people: a refined, high-quality, comfortable freeway cruiser and a sporty back-roads car, with fine steering and brakes and a sweet 5-speed automatic shifter in Turbo Model".
- In 2005, the Lafayette Factory built Subaru Legacy wins 2005 International Car of the Year for Most Dependable/Sedan from Road & Travel Magazine.
- In 2006, the EJ255 use in Legacy 2.5GT and Impreza WRX engine wins International Engine of the Year Award in the 2.0 liter to 2.5 liter category.
