= Kia =

South Korean automobile manufacturer

Kia Corporation

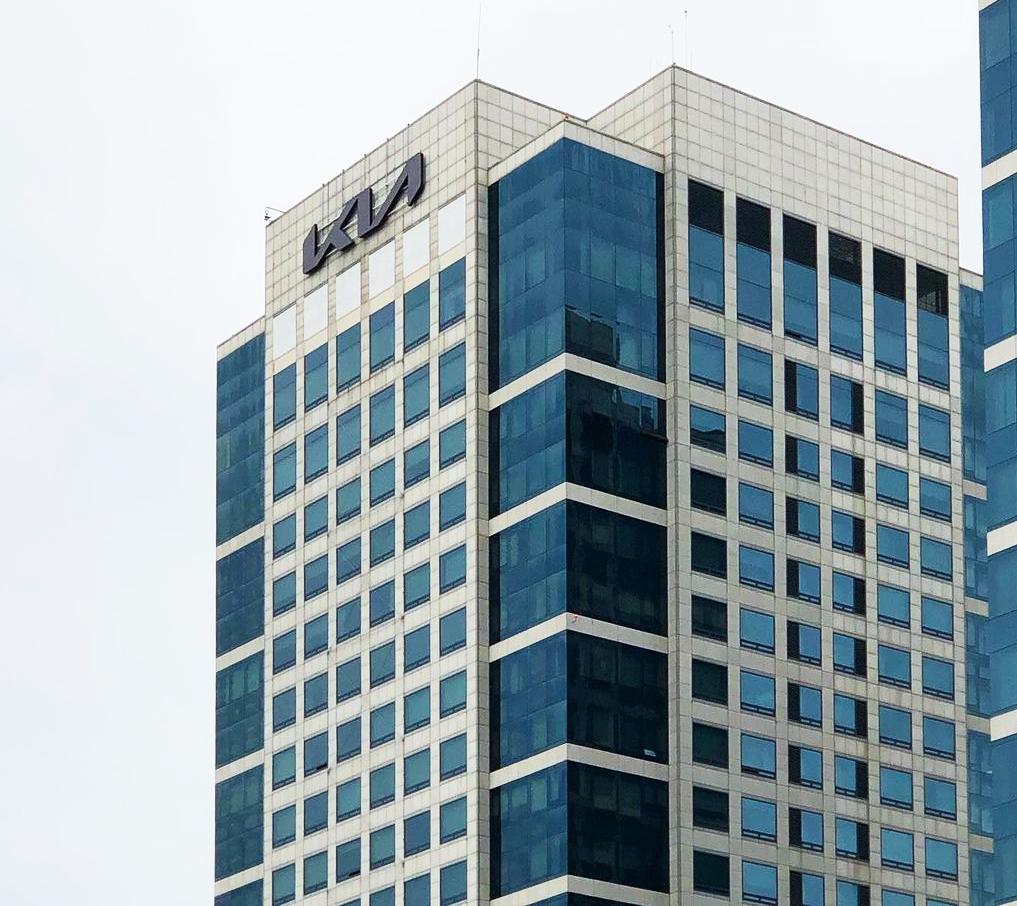
- Global headquarters in Seoul
- Native name: 기아 주식회사
- Formerly: Kyungsung Precision Industry (1944–1952); Kia Industrial Company (1952–1990); Kia Motors Corporation (1990–2021)
- Type: Public
- Traded as: KRX: 000270
- Industry: Automotive
- Founded: May 1944; 82 years ago
- Headquarters: Seoul, South Korea
- Area served: Worldwide
- Key people: Chung Eui-sun (chairman); Song Ho-Sung (president & CEO); Karim Habib (chief design officer)
- Products: Automobiles; Commercial vehicles
- Production output: ▲2.85 million (2025)
- Revenue: ▲ ₩114.141 trillion (2025)
- Operating income: ▲ ₩9.0781 trillion (2025)
- Net income: ▲ ₩7.554 trillion (2025)
- Total assets: ▲ ₩98.979 trillion (2025)
- Total equity: ▲ ₩61.1904 trillion (2025)
- Owners: Hyundai Motor Company (35.17%); National Pension Service (7.25%); Chung Eui-sun (1.81%)
- Number of employees: ▲51,026 (2025)
- Parent: Hyundai Motor Company
- Subsidiaries: Kia America; Kia Canada; Kia India; Kia Central & South America; Kia Middle East/Iran; Kia Europe; Kia Mexico; Kia Pakistan LMC
- Website: kia.com

- Kia
- Hangul: 기아
- Hanja: 起亞
- RR: Gia
- MR: Kia

Kia Corporation (Korean: 기아; pronounced [ki.a]) is a South Korean multinational automobile manufacturer headquartered in Seoul, South Korea. It is South Korea's second-largest automobile manufacturer, after its parent company, Hyundai Motor Company, with global sales of over 3.1 million vehicles in 2025. Hyundai Motor Company is Kia’s largest shareholder, holding 35.17% of the company as of 2025; Hyundai Motor Company and related parties together hold 36.99%.

== Etymology ==
According to the company, "Kia" derives from the Hanja 起 (ki, 'to arise') and 亞 (a, which stands for 亞細亞, meaning 'Asia'); it is roughly translated as 'rising from (East) Asia'.

== History ==
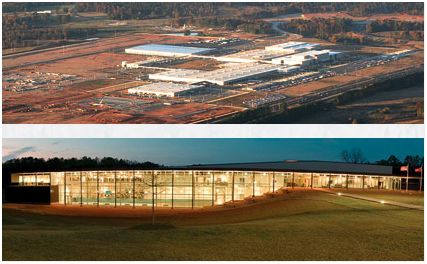
Kia's South Korean factories

=== Origins and the early expansion ===
Kia was founded in May 1944 as Kyungsung Precision Industry (경성정밀공업; 京城精密工業), a manufacturer of steel tubing and bicycle parts, eventually producing South Korea's first domestic bicycle, the Samchuly, in 1951. In 1952, Kyungsung Precision Industry changed its name to Kia Industries. The company later built Honda-licensed small motorcycles (starting in 1957), as well as Mazda-licensed trucks (1962).

The company opened its first integrated automotive assembly plant, the Sohari Plant, in 1973. Its first modele was the Mazda-based Brisa range of small cars in 1974 and the Brisa II/K303 family car in 1975. It also assembled two European models under license: the Fiat 132 and the Peugeot 604. The import of these knock-down kits were permitted as long as Kia exported five cars for every single Fiat or Peugeot vehicle model being brought in; Hyundai had to meet the same requirement.

In 1981, the new military dictator Chun Doo-hwan enforced industry consolidation. This forced Kia to stop producing passenger cars and focus entirely on light trucks. Kia assembled a few hundred more cars in 1982 and 1983, after the ban had taken effect, but no passenger cars were built in 1984 or 1985.

Kia rejoined the automobile industry in 1986, in partnership with the American company Ford. It built only 26 units the first year, but quickly grew to over 95,000 the next year. Kia produced several Mazda-derived vehicles both for domestic sales in South Korea and for export into other countries, where they were positioned at the budget end of the market. These models included the Kia Pride, based on the Mazda 121, and the Avella, which were sold in North America and Australasia as the Ford Festiva and Ford Aspire. Kia Industries was renamed Kia Motors Corporation in 1990.

In 1992, Kia Motors America was incorporated in the United States. The first Kia-branded car in the United States, the Sephia, began sales the following year from four dealerships in Portland, Oregon. The Sephia went for sale in Europe in 1994. The company then expanded its line with the Sportage sport utility vehicle, which was also built in Germany by Karmann for the European market. Over one hundred Kia dealerships existed across thirty states by 1995, selling a record 24,740 automobiles.

Interior of a Kia dealership in Concord, North Carolina

=== Hyundai Motor Company takeover ===
Kia declared bankruptcy in 1997 during the Asian financial crisis and, in 1998, reached an agreement with Hyundai Motor Company to diversify by exchanging ownership between the two companies. Hyundai Motor Company acquired 51% in the company in that year, leading to the formation of Hyundai Motor Group. After subsequent divestments, Hyundai Motor Company owns about one third of Kia Motor Corporation. While Hyundai Motor Company remains Kia's largest stakeholder, Kia also retains ownership in some 22 Hyundai subsidiaries.

=== Later development ===
Since 2005, Kia has focused on the European market and has identified design as its "core future growth engine" – leading to the hiring of Peter Schreyer in 2006 as chief design officer and his subsequent creation of a new corporate grille known as the 'Tiger Nose'. In October 2006, Kia Motors America broke ground for Kia Motors Manufacturing Georgia in West Point, Georgia, representing a US$1 billion investment for the company. Kia Motors Manufacturing Georgia opened in February 2010, after Kia recorded its 15th consecutive year of increased U.S. market share.

Kia started using an angular "KIA" wordmark logo and removed "Motors" from its corporate name to become Kia Corporation from January 2021 onwards. In November 2021, Kia announced a roadmap to achieve carbon neutrality across its value chain by 2045. The company said it planned to reduce 97% of its 2019-level carbon emissions and offset the remainder, while fully electrifying its vehicle line-up in Europe by 2035.

Kia's Tasman pickup truck made its global debut at the Jeddah International Motor Show in Saudi Arabia on 29 Oct. 2024. At its 2025 Kia EV Day in Tarragona, Spain, on 27 February 2025, Kia unveiled the EV4, the PV5—its first dedicated Platform Beyond Vehicle (PBV) model—and the Concept EV2, expanding its electrified line-up.

== Board of directors ==
As of March 2023:

- Chung Eui-sun, Chairman
- Song Ho-sung, President and CEO
- Choi Jun-young, Executive Vice President and Chief Safety Officer
- Joo Woo-jeong, Executive Vice President & CFO
- Han Chol-su, Outside Director
- Jo Wha-sun, Outside Director
- Chyun Chan-hyuk, Outside Director
- Shin Jae-young, Outside Director
- Jennifer Hyunjong Shin, Outside Director

=== Previous CEOs ===
- Chung Eui-Sun (2005–2009)
- Hyong-keun (Hank) Lee (2009–2017)
- Park Han-woo (2017–2020)

== Affiliates and subsidiaries ==
=== Hyundai Motor Company ===
As of 2025, Hyundai Motor Company is Kia’s largest shareholder, holding 137,318,251 common shares, or 35.17% of the company. Hyundai Motor Company and related parties together hold 36.99%, while the National Pension Service is disclosed as a major shareholder with a 7.25% stake.

=== Kia America ===
Kia vehicles

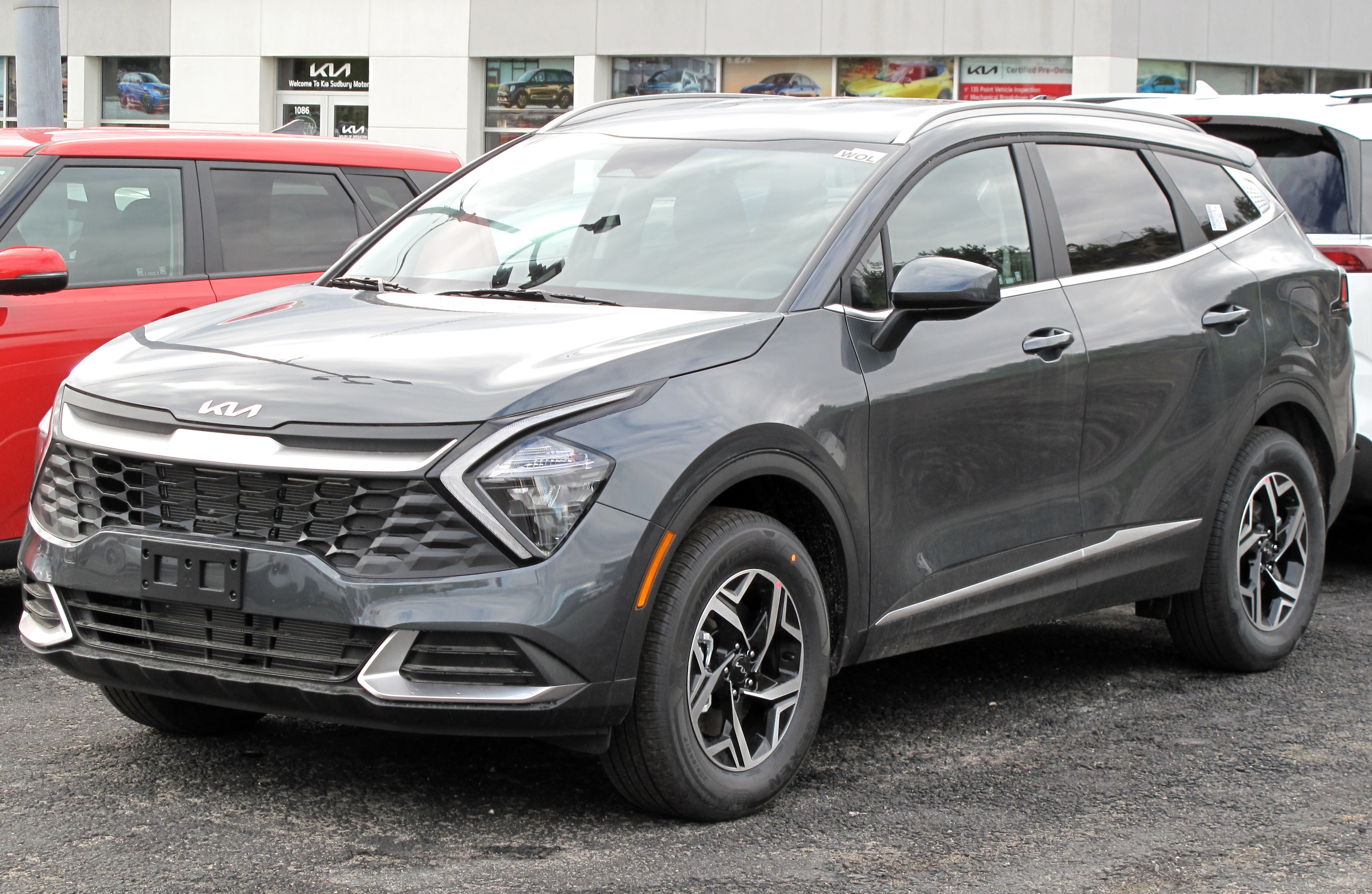
Sportage

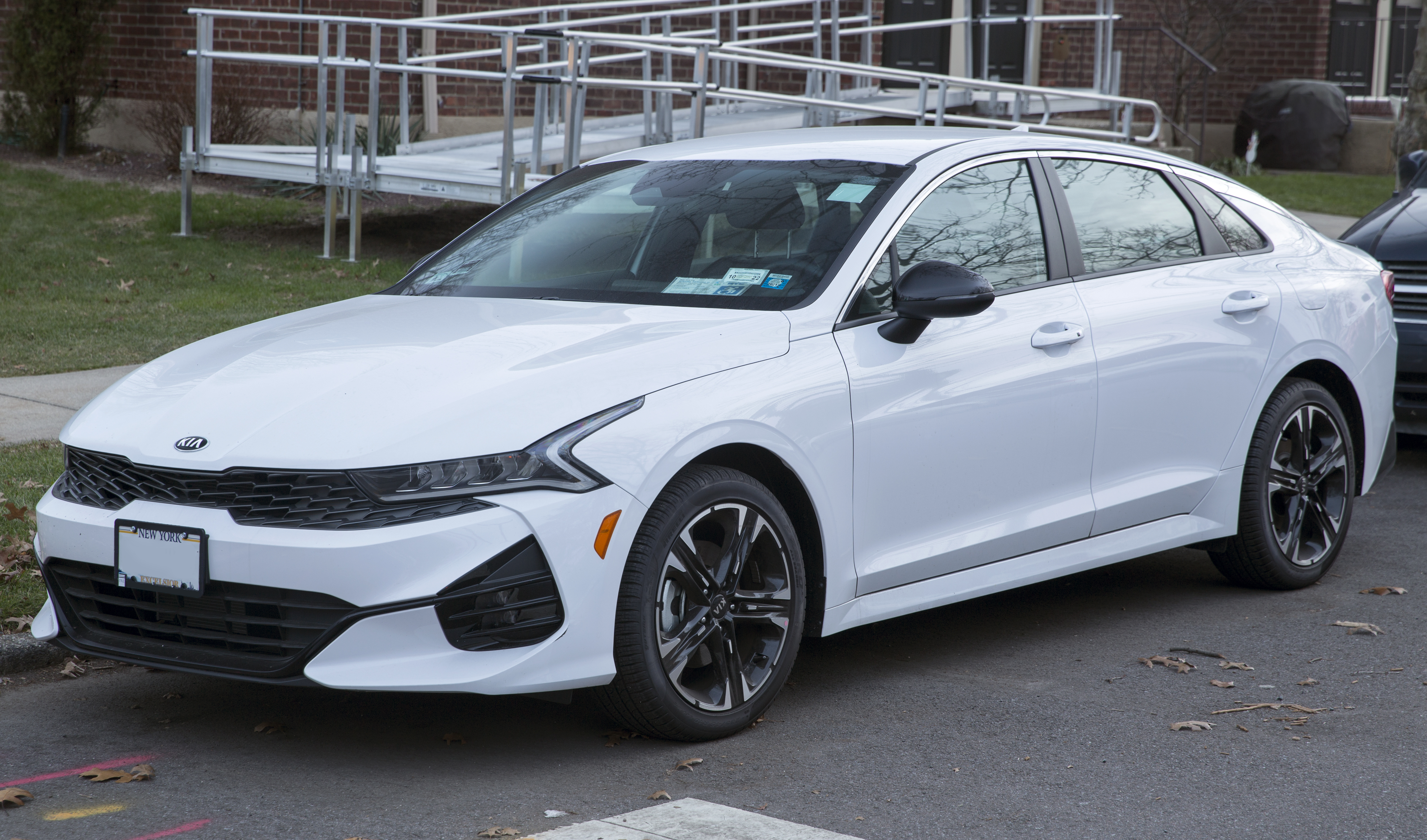
K5

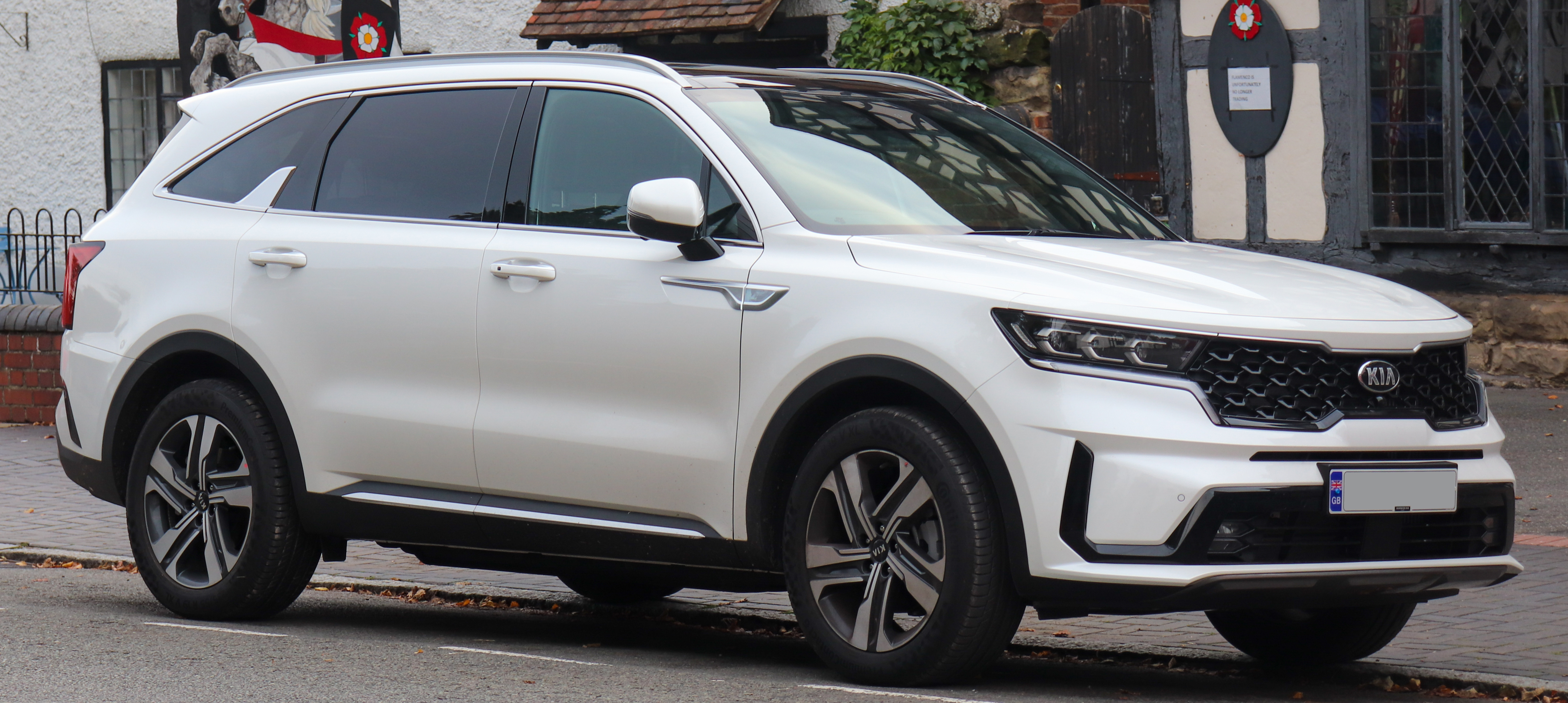
Sorento

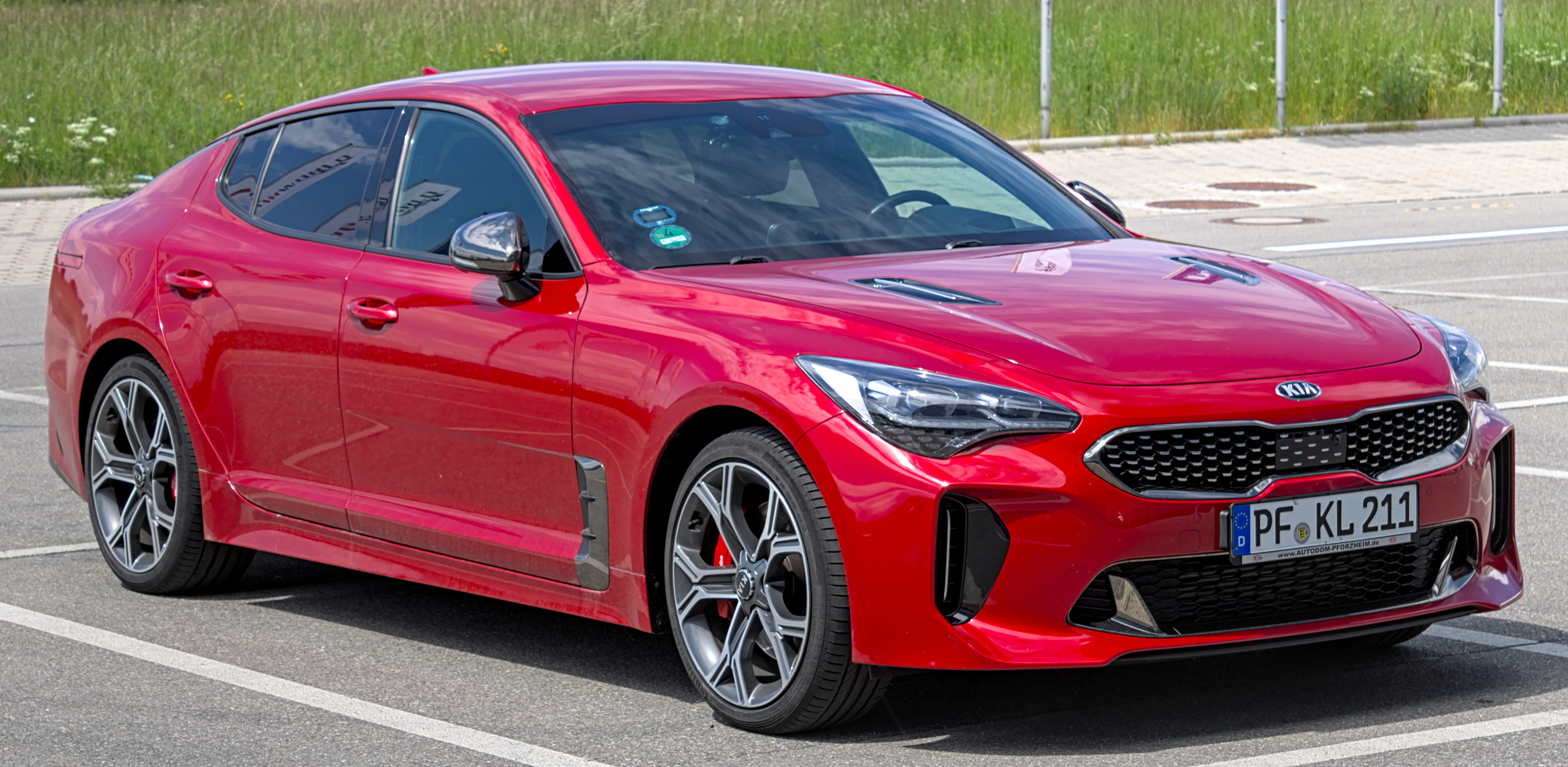
Stinger

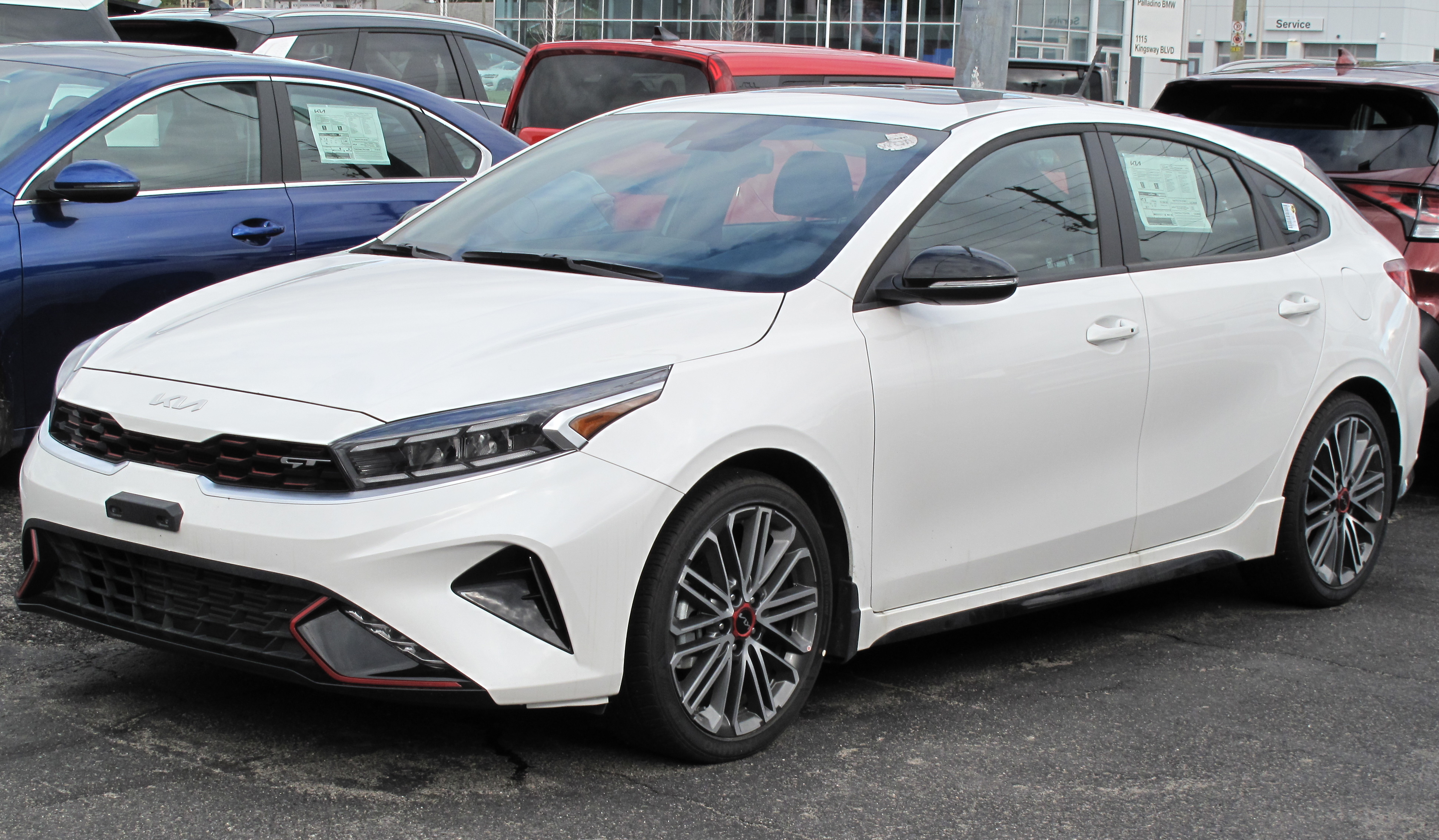
Forte, Cerato

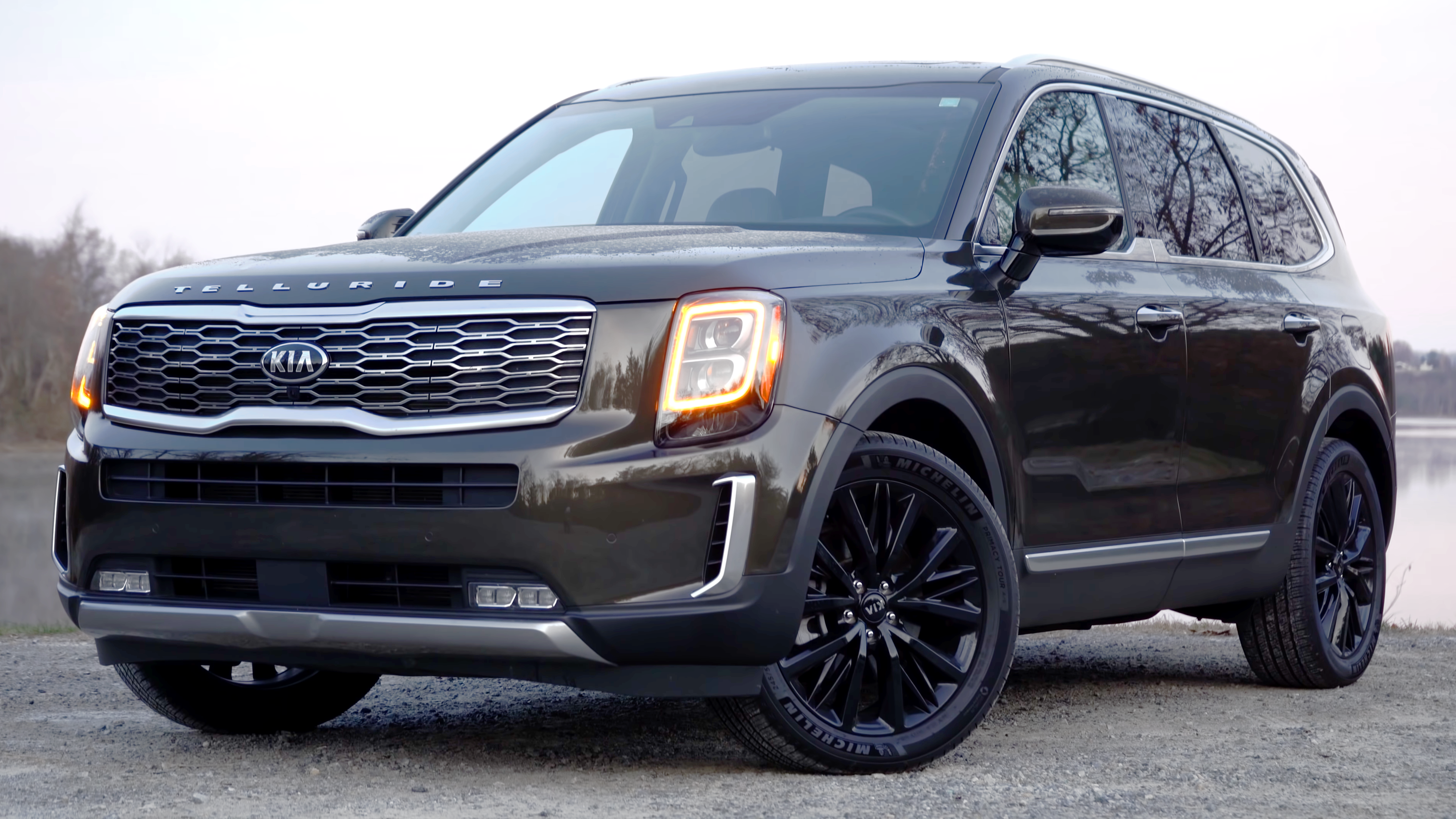
Telluride

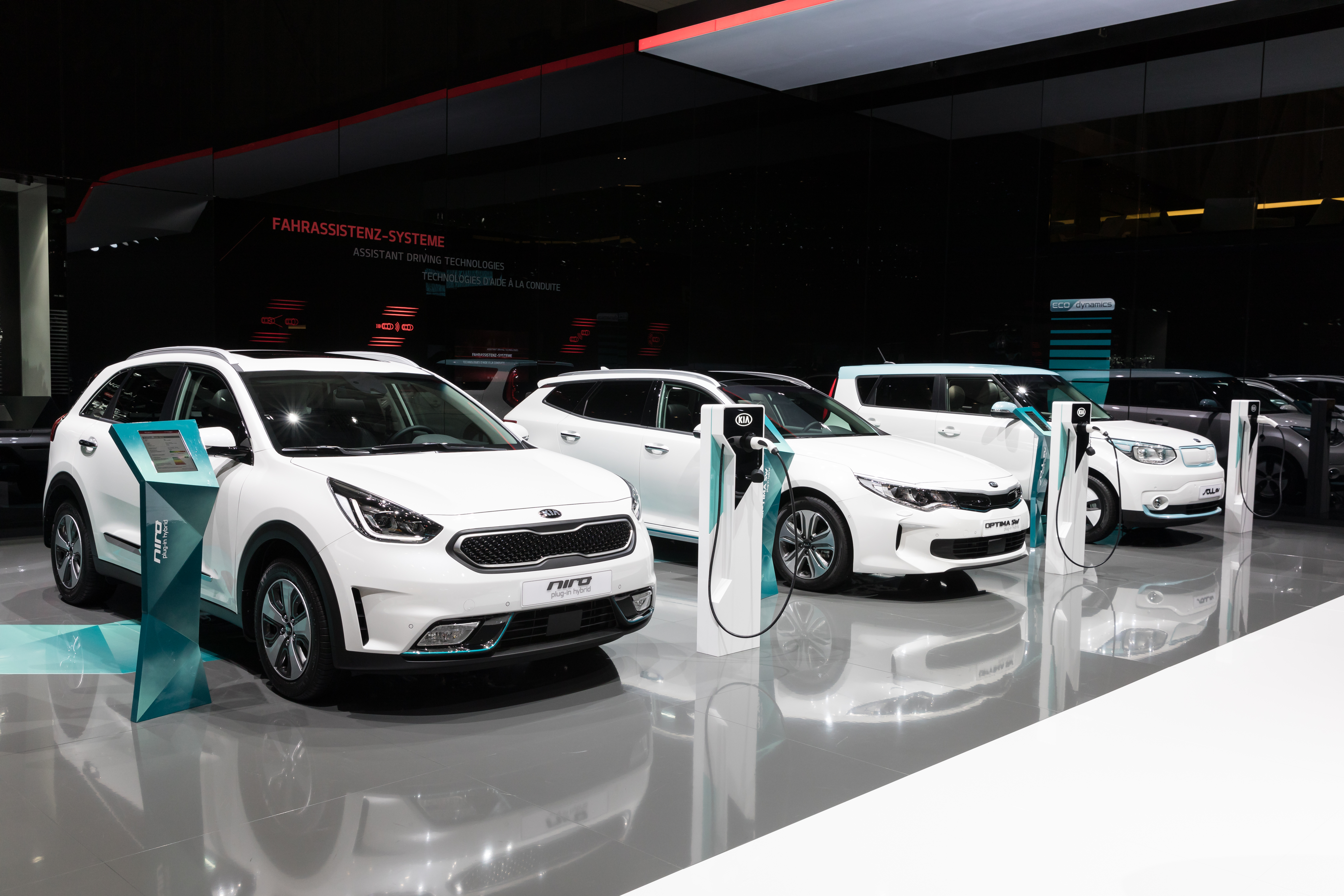
Electric and hybrid electric vehicle family 2018

Kia Motors America (KMA), now known as Kia America, Inc., was incorporated in California on October 21, 1992, and became the American sales, marketing, and distribution arm of Kia Corporation. Kia America is based in Irvine, California, and currently offers a complete line of vehicles through more than 755 dealers throughout the United States. The first two models that were introduced to the U.S. market in 1993 were KIA Sephia and Kia Sportage 4x4. In the United States, sales began in late 1993 for the 1994 model year, at four dealerships in Portland, Oregon.

As a brand, KMA has continued to improve over the years as well; in 2013, Kia Motors America recorded its 18th consecutive year of increased U.S. market share, and for the past five consecutive years (2015–2019) it has been recognized by J.D. Power as the highest ranked mass market brand in initial quality.

In November 2009, Kia started production at the first U.S. Kia Motors plant, Kia Motors Manufacturing Georgia, in West Point. Though the Kia Sorento crossover vehicle was the only model to be assembled there at first, the facility has since expanded its production lines to include the Kia Optima mid-size sedan, now sold as the K5, in 2011 and the Kia Telluride crossover SUV in January 2019. As of September 2019, the location has successfully built over 3 million units of these three models altogether, and shortly after celebrated another milestone by reaching its 10th year of production in November 2019. Currently, the facility has a production capacity of 340,000 vehicles per year (largely dedicated to the Telluride and Sorento crossover SUVs) and is responsible for distributing them to hundreds of dealerships in the U.S. and Canada, as well as fulfilling shipments across North America and even overseas. In 2025, Kia America posted total sales of 852,155 units, its highest annual total and the first time it surpassed 800,000 units, up 7% from 2024 and marking a third consecutive annual sales record.

=== Kia Canada ===
Kia Canada was formed in 1999 as a subsidiary of Kia Motors Corporation serving the Canadian market. It is headquartered in Mississauga, Ontario, where it employs approximately 180 people. Kia Canada is best known for its mid-market lineup of sport utility vehicles and crossovers, which are midway in size between SUVs and ordinary sedans, and increasingly for its electric vehicles and plug-in hybrids. In 2021, Kia Canada introduced a new logo and slogan, "Movement that inspires". In 2025, Kia Canada set an annual sales record with 94,622 vehicles sold, up 9.2% from 2024.

=== Kia Central & South America Corp. ===
Kia Central & South America Corp. is an incorporated division of Kia Corporation in charge of sales and marketing in 43 countries across Central and South America (including Brazil), and the Caribbean. The regional headquarters is located in Miami, Florida (US).

=== Kia Europe ===
Kia Europe is the European sales and marketing division of Kia Corporation. It has been selling cars in Europe since the first half of 1991.

Kia Motors Europe is formally founded in 1995, in Neu Wulmstorf (near Hamburg). In 1997, Kia moves its European headquarters from Neu Wulmstorf to Bremen, and due to logistical reasons since around 2005, Kia moved its European headquarters to Eschborn (near Frankfurt).

In 2007, KME moved from its previous location at Hauptstrasse 185, Eschborn (near Frankfurt), to a new purpose-built facility adjacent to the Messe, in Frankfurt city centre.

When Kia launched in Europe during 1991, it initially sold only the Pride supermini – a rebadged version of the late 1980s Mazda 121. It initially proved popular with buyers. By the end of 1991, Kia had sold nearly 1,800 Prides in the United Kingdom. The first full year, 1992, saw that figure double, and, in 1993, it increased again to nearly 5,500 units. However, sales fell towards the end of the decade, and the end of production was finally announced in May 2000, with its successor – the Rio – not going on sale for another year.

From 1995 to 1999, Kia produced left- and right-hand drive versions of the first generation Sportage SUV at the Karmann factory in Osnabrück, Germany. These have been popular across Europe, but, since 2002, Kia has gained more sales in this market thanks to the launch of the larger Sorento. From 1999 until production of the model ceased in 2003, all Sportage production reverted to South Korea.

The European range also expanded in the spring of 1994 when Kia began importing the larger Mentor, a range of medium-sized hatchbacks and sedans which were marketed as inexpensive and well-equipped alternatives to the likes of the Ford Escort and the Vauxhall/Opel Astra.

A facelift in 1999 saw the Mentor name retained for the saloon (sedan), but the hatchback was renamed Shuma. These models remained on sale until 2004, when the newer Cerato was launched and gave Kia one of its first serious competitors against mainstream brands. The Clarus saloon and Sedona MPV were also launched onto the UK market during 1999, helping Kia begin its rise in popularity.

Despite Kia's range increasing from one car as late as 1993, to three cars by the end of 1995, British sales actually decreased in that period, from nearly 5,500 in 1993 to less than 4,000 the following year. In 1998, Kia's future in Britain was thrown into serious doubt when it sold less than 3,000 of its whole range – the worst in any full year on the British market. Kia did not enter Europe's large family car market until the launch of its Clarus four-door sedan in 1999 – a year behind schedule due to the financial difficulties that Kia was facing before it was taken over by Hyundai. This car was similar in size to the Ford Mondeo and the Opel/Vauxhall Vectra, but, on its launch, was actually less expensive to buy than the smaller Focus and the Astra. It had a spacious interior, large boot, competitive asking price, and high equipment levels, but it had little more appeal to sway buyers away from established European brands like Ford, Vauxhall/Opel and Peugeot.

Its successor, the Magentis, launched in 2001, was still nowhere near as popular as Kia might have hoped it would be, although with a sub-£14,000 asking price it offered the cheapest V6-engined car in the UK, by which time it was rare enough for a six-cylinder car to be priced at less than £20,000.

Kia entered the MPV market in 1999 with the Sedona. On its launch, it was the lowest-priced, full-size people carrier on sale in the United Kingdom. With the range expanded by 1999, sales for that year reached almost 6,400 – more than double the previous year's total. That annual sales figure had almost been matched in 2000 by the end of May, reflecting Kia's growing popularity with British buyers. By 2009, Kia was firmly established as a popular brand in Britain, when sales broke the 50,000 barrier for the first time and the brand now had a share of more than 2% in the new car market. The Picanto was the most popular single model with nearly 17,000 sales.

Kia's manufacturing plant near Žilina, in Teplička nad Váhom, was the company's first vehicle production facility in Europe. Construction began in October 2004 and was completed in December 2005, with vehicle production starting in December 2006. As of August 2025, Kia AutoLand Slovakia employed around 3,700 people and operated more than 600 robots. The plant had an annual production capacity of 350,000 vehicles and 540,000 engines and had produced more than five million vehicles since opening, exporting them to 83 countries. On August 20, 2025, the plant began mass production of the EV4 hatchback, Kia's first fully electric vehicle manufactured in Europe, following a €108 million modernization of its production lines.

=== Kia Mexico ===
The company has built a $1 billion manufacturing plant in the northern Mexican state of Nuevo León, which produces 300,000 cars a year. Details of the factory, built in the city of Pesquería, were revealed in a joint press conference given by Kia CEO Hyoung-Keun Lee and the President of Mexico Enrique Peña Nieto in Mexico City on August 28, 2014. The plant was expected to be completed in the first half of 2016. This factory is involved in controversies because it was built on unevenly purchased land, and the construction agreement was made with advantage conditions and out of the local dispositions to Kia.

=== Kia India ===
The company entered the Indian market in July 2019 with its 'Made for India' SUV- SP2 Concept now announced as the global mid-sized SUV Kia Seltos. N. Chandrababu Naidu is lauded to have signed an MOU for the government of Andhra Pradesh which came to be one of the biggest FDI's with a total investment of Rs.12,900 crore. The company has built a production facility on a Greenfield land in Anantpur district, Andhra Pradesh near Penukonda. The annual production capacity is 350,000 units.

In January 2018, Kia appointed Kookhyun Shim as the managing director and CEO of Kia Motors India. Shim led the automaker’s expansion in the Indian market and oversaw the construction of its first manufacturing facility in the country. Kia also announced an investment of US$1.1 billion in the facility and the development of its Indian operations. On 31 July 2020, Kia surpassed 100,000 vehicle sales in India, becoming the fastest automaker in the country to reach the milestone. Shim was succeeded by Tae-Jin Park in October 2021, and in January 2024 Gwanggu Lee was appointed as Kia India’s third managing director and CEO. In calendar year 2025, Kia India recorded wholesale sales of 280,286 units, up 15% from 245,000 units in 2024.

=== Lucky Motor Corporation ===
Lucky Motor Corporation (LMC) is an automobile assembler and distributor in Pakistan owned by the Yunus Brothers Group. Originally known as Kia Lucky Motors Pakistan, the company began selling cars in 2018 when it launched its All New Grand Carnival in Pakistan. In quarter 4 2019, Kia Lucky Motors Pakistan introduced two new locally manufactured products known as the Kia Sportage and Kia Picanto.

=== Kia Russia ===
Kia holds a 30% stake in the Hyundai Motor Manufacturing Rus plant in St. Petersburg which is being sold in December 2023 following the problems associated with the 2022 Russian invasion of Ukraine. The contract includes a two year buy back clause. In 2022, the company's revenue amounted to 111 billion rubles.

=== Kia Defense ===
Kia military vehicles

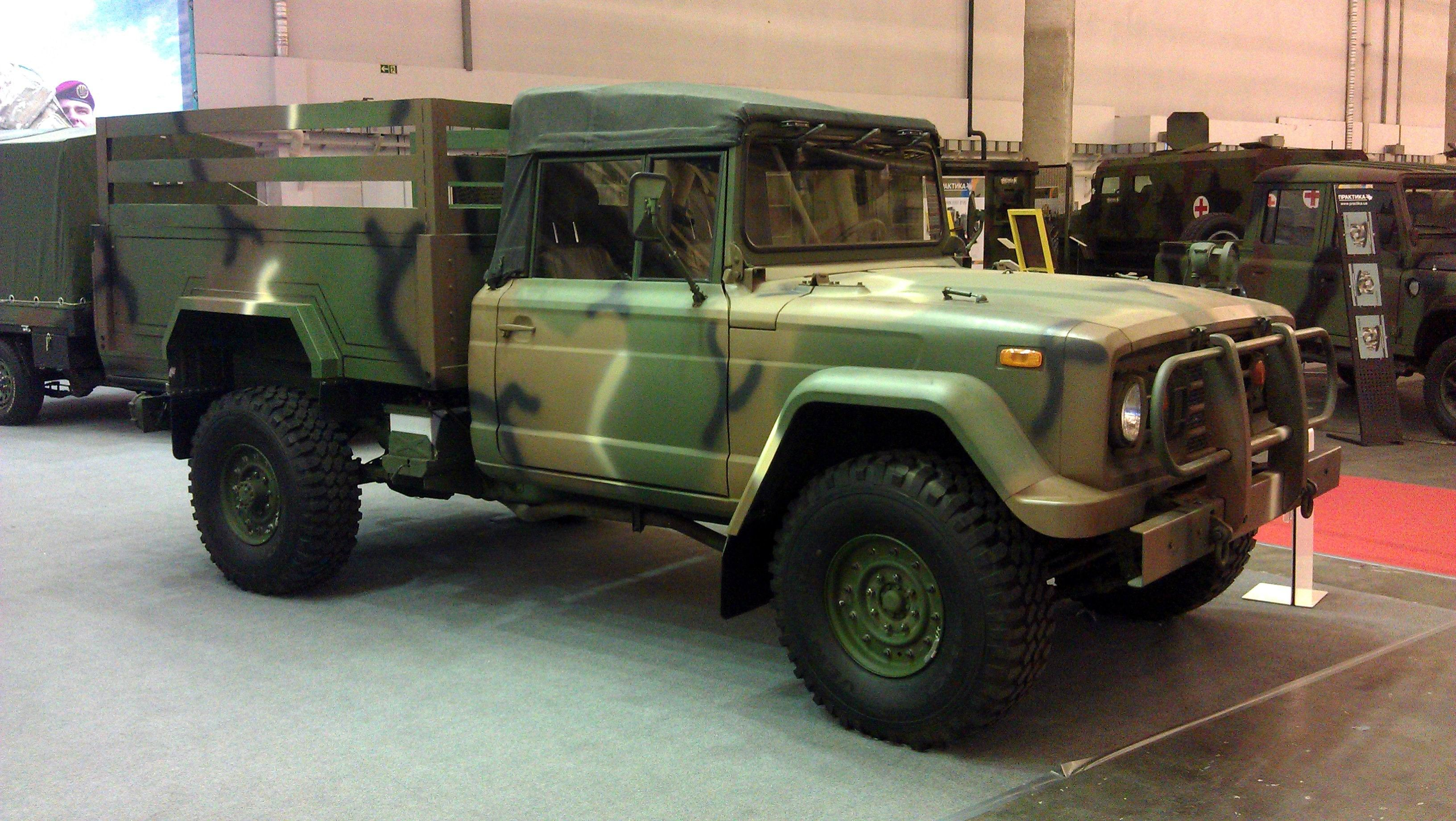
Ukrainian Bogdan Group produced KM-450

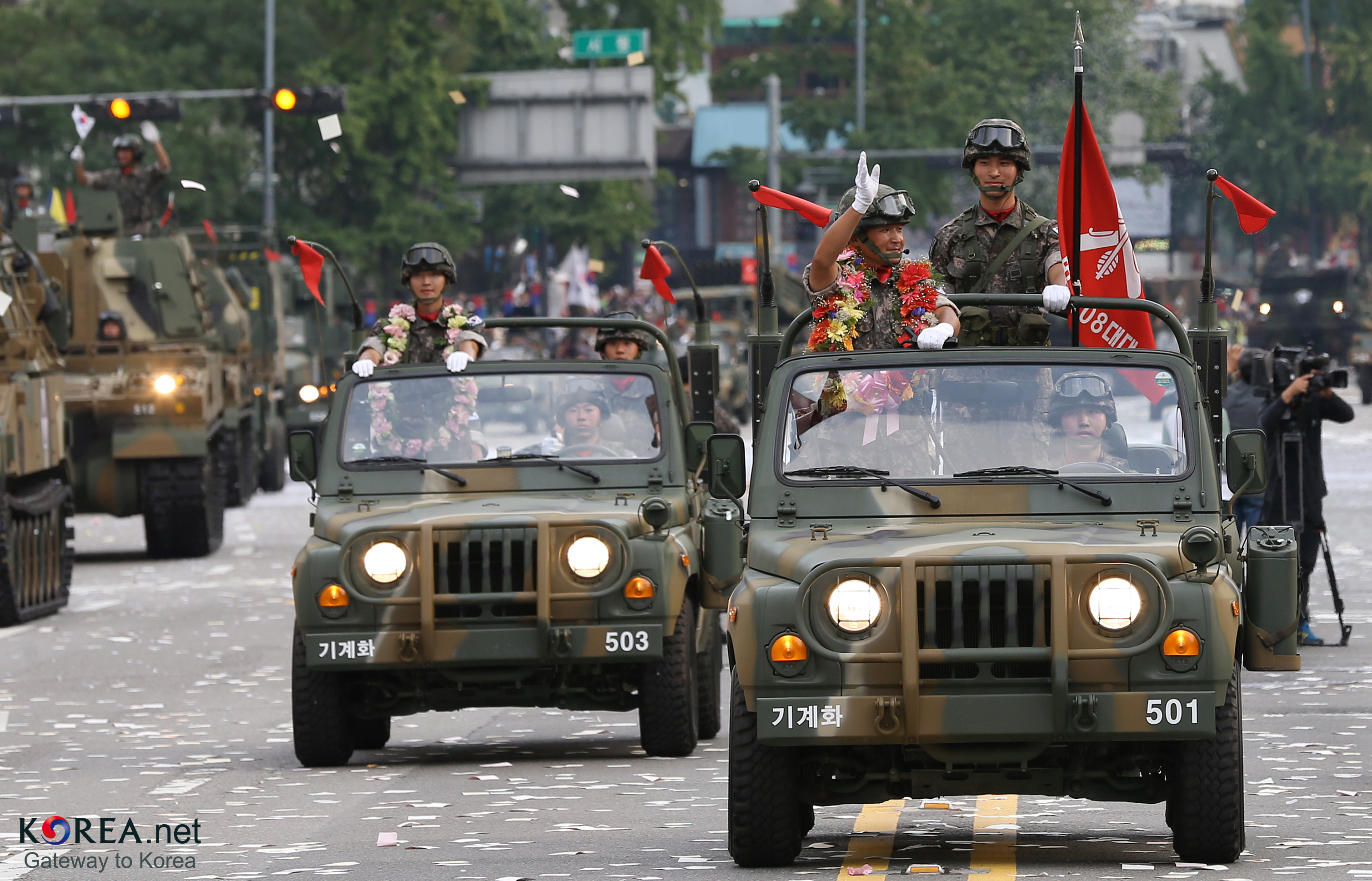
Kia KM420

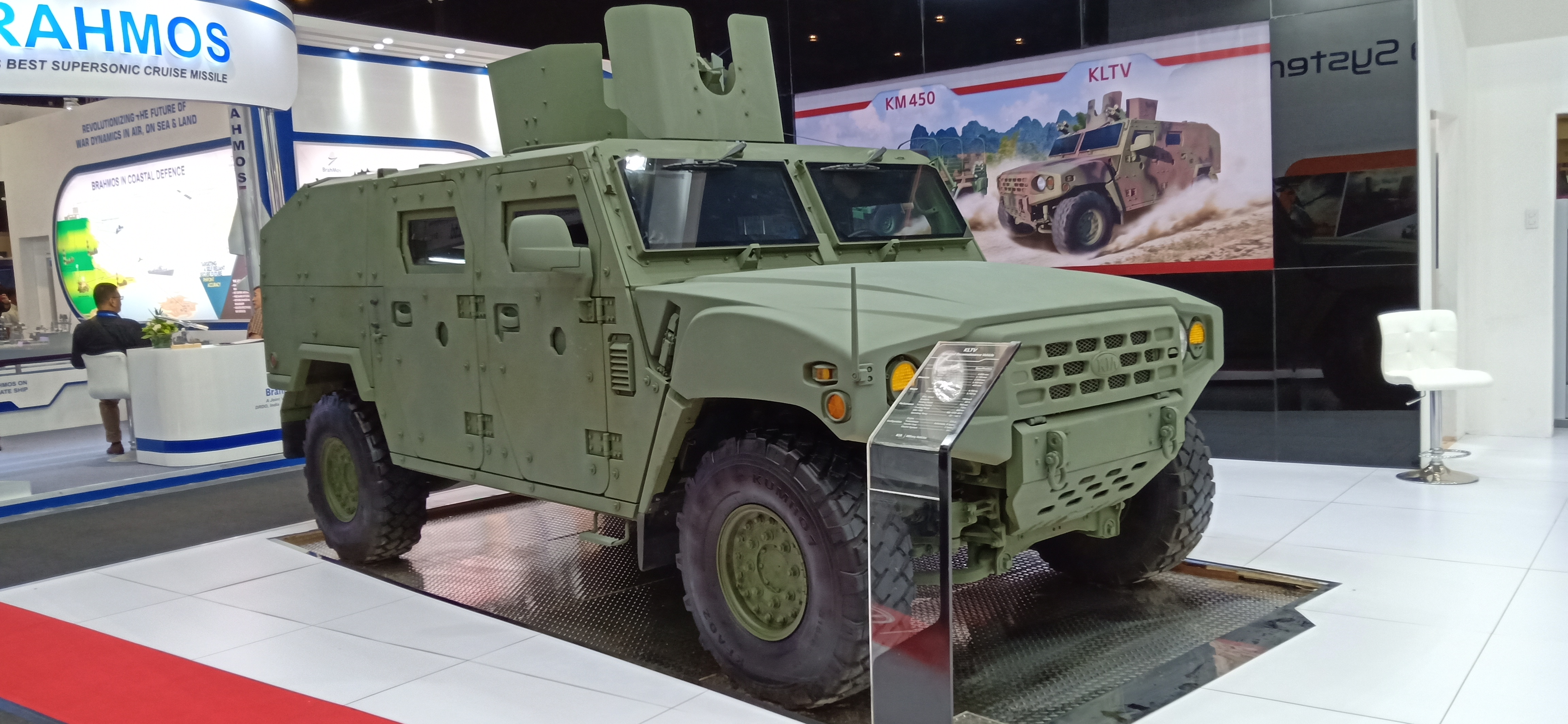
K151 Raycolt light tactical vehicle

Kia Motors has specialized in the production of military vehicles with variants and other transportation equipment and by supplying them as a sole maker of military vehicles designated by the South Korean Government since 1976, when Kia Heavy Industry Co. Ltd. (now known as Hyundai Wia) was established. Kia is currently designing a Kaiser Jeep M715-type vehicle named the KM450 for the South Korean Army on license from the U.S. Government. Kia is also the owner of the former ex-Asia Motors factory in Gwangju.

== Models ==
=== Sales figures ===
Best-selling Kia models globally in 2025
Rank	Model	Global sales
1	Sportage	569,688
2	Seltos	299,766
3	Sorento	264,673

In calendar year 2025, Kia set a global sales record of 3,135,803 vehicles.

== Design emphasis ==
In the past, the Kia cars were very neutral. When you saw one on the road, you didn't really know if it was Korean or Japanese...I think it's very important that you are able to recognize a Kia at first sight.

— Peter Schreyer

Beginning in 2006 Kia identified design as its "core future growth engine" – leading to the 2006 hiring of Peter Schreyer and to the 2005 hiring Tom Kearns as Chief Design Officer. Schreyer had previously worked at Audi (designing the Audi TT) and Volkswagen and had won the Design Award of the Federal Republic of Germany. Kearns had previously worked at Cadillac as Chief Design Officer and was responsible for influencing Cadillac's direction of hard angles and sharp lines within its design. Schreyer has since been central to a complete restyling of Kia's line-up, overseeing design activities at Kia's design centers in Frankfurt, Los Angeles, Tokyo, and the Namyang Design Center in South Korea.

With the Kee concept vehicle, shown at the Frankfurt Motor Show in 2007, Kia introduced a new corporate grille to create a recognizable 'face' for the brand. Known as the Tiger Nose, Schreyer indicated he wanted "a powerful visual signal, a seal, an identifier. The front of a car needs this recognition, this expression. A car needs a face and I think the new Kia face is strong and distinctive. Visibility is vital and that face should immediately allow you to identify a Kia even from a distance." Schreyer described how the Kia Tiger Nose came to be as he explained, "I was just working on the car and just thinking about different possibilities, and suddenly I found it." Commenting on the new signature grille in 2009: "From now on, we'll have it on all our cars". Kia has since featured the Tiger Nose on all of its vehicles, ranging from the compact Kia Soul, on to the new design of the Kia Optima, and to the larger SUV, the Kia Telluride. Kia cars won the Road & Travel Magazine International Car of the Year award in 2013, 2014 and 2015.

== Controversies ==
=== United States Environmental Protection Agency ===
In late 2012, Kia Motors was forced to admit error in inflating its United States Environmental Protection Agency mileage claims and had to reduce its fuel economy claims in the U.S. by about 3 percent across the board and to offer compensation to previous vehicle buyers.

=== Nuevo León plant ===
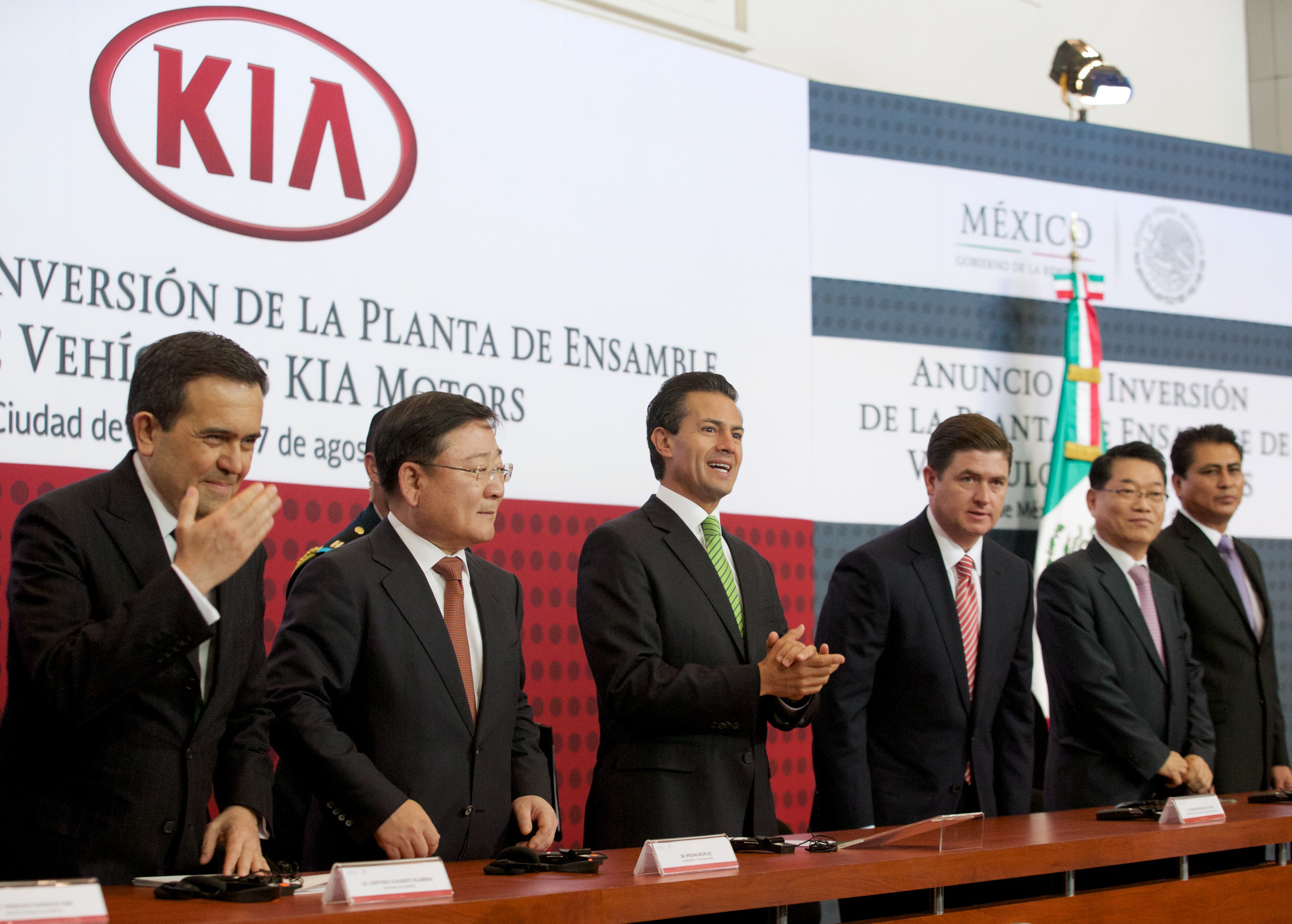
Announcement of the Kia assembly plant, Mexico City, 2014

Since 2014, Kia Motors has been involved in controversies in Mexico due to alleged irregularities in the construction of one of its manufacturing plants, located in the municipality of Pesquería, Nuevo León. The construction of the plant was done in an irregularly purchased land agreement between Kia Motors Mexico and the State of Nuevo León, then headed by Rodrigo Medina de la Cruz, was signed with unfairly advantageous conditions, such as bigger tax incentives than those allowed by Mexican law (tax exemptions for 20 years when the standard is 5), extended to the Mexican providers of Kia.

A copy of the full agreement was published on Facebook by current Nuevo León governor, Jaime Rodríguez Calderón, as part of a prosecution case against Medina and he declared that the signed agreement with his predecessor would be cancelled. A new agreement was then reached with Rodriguez's administration in June 2016. Former governor Medina de la Cruz and 30 other officials of the former state administration were investigated by an anti-corruption prosecutor for alleged embezzlement, improper exercise of public functions and damage to Nuevo León State assets. Medina was then taken into custody on January 26, 2017, in relation to this case and others in which he is involved.

=== Kia Challenge ===
In 2022, a trend known as the Kia Challenge went viral on the social media platform TikTok. The TikTok challenge involves stealing certain models of Kia and Hyundai cars manufactured from 2010 to 2021. Certain Kia and Hyundai were reportedly manufactured without immobilizers making the vehicles easier to steal. Kia responded by offering a free software update to affected models which requires the vehicle to have a key in the ignition in order for it to start. They also distributed over 26,000 steering wheel locks to law enforcement agencies to provide to owners of affected models. In February 2023, the National Highway Traffic Safety Administration reported that the challenge had resulted in at least 14 crashes and eight deaths.

In May 2023, following a class action lawsuit, Kia and Hyundai agreed to pay $200 million settlement to consumers who suffered losses as a result of the security flaws. However, on August 16, 2023, a federal judge rejected the proposed settlement.

On 16 December 2025, Washington’s attorney general and 35 other state attorneys general announced a settlement requiring Hyundai and Kia to equip future U.S. vehicles with engine immobilizers and to offer free zinc-reinforced ignition cylinder protectors to owners or lessees of eligible vehicles. The companies also agreed to provide up to $4.5 million in restitution to eligible consumers and pay $4.5 million to the states for investigation costs.

=== Data Collection and Privacy Concerns ===
Kia has faced criticism over its data collection practices, with consumer group CHOICE identifying Kia and parent company Hyundai as among the “worst offenders” for collecting and sharing voice recognition data with third parties without adequate customer protection. In 2025, the Texas Attorney General warned Kia America that it was violating state privacy law by allegedly selling sensitive driver information to data brokers like LexisNexis Risk Solutions, which often led to increased insurance premiums. Additionally, Mozilla’s Privacy Not Included report flagged Kia’s privacy policy for mentioning the potential collection of race or ethnicity, religious or philosophical beliefs, sexual orientation, sex life, union membership, and political data. James Bell a spokesperson for Kia responded by saying “Kia does not and has never collected ‘sex life or sexual orientation’ information" that category was only included to comply with California law, and insisted such information is never collected.

== Logo history ==
1953–1964

1964–1986

1986–1994

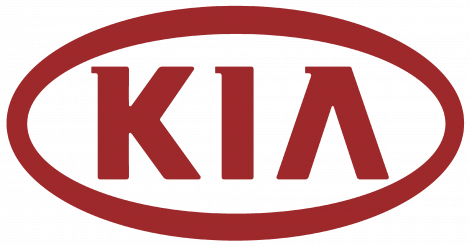
1994–2012

2012–2021

2021–present

== Sponsorship ==
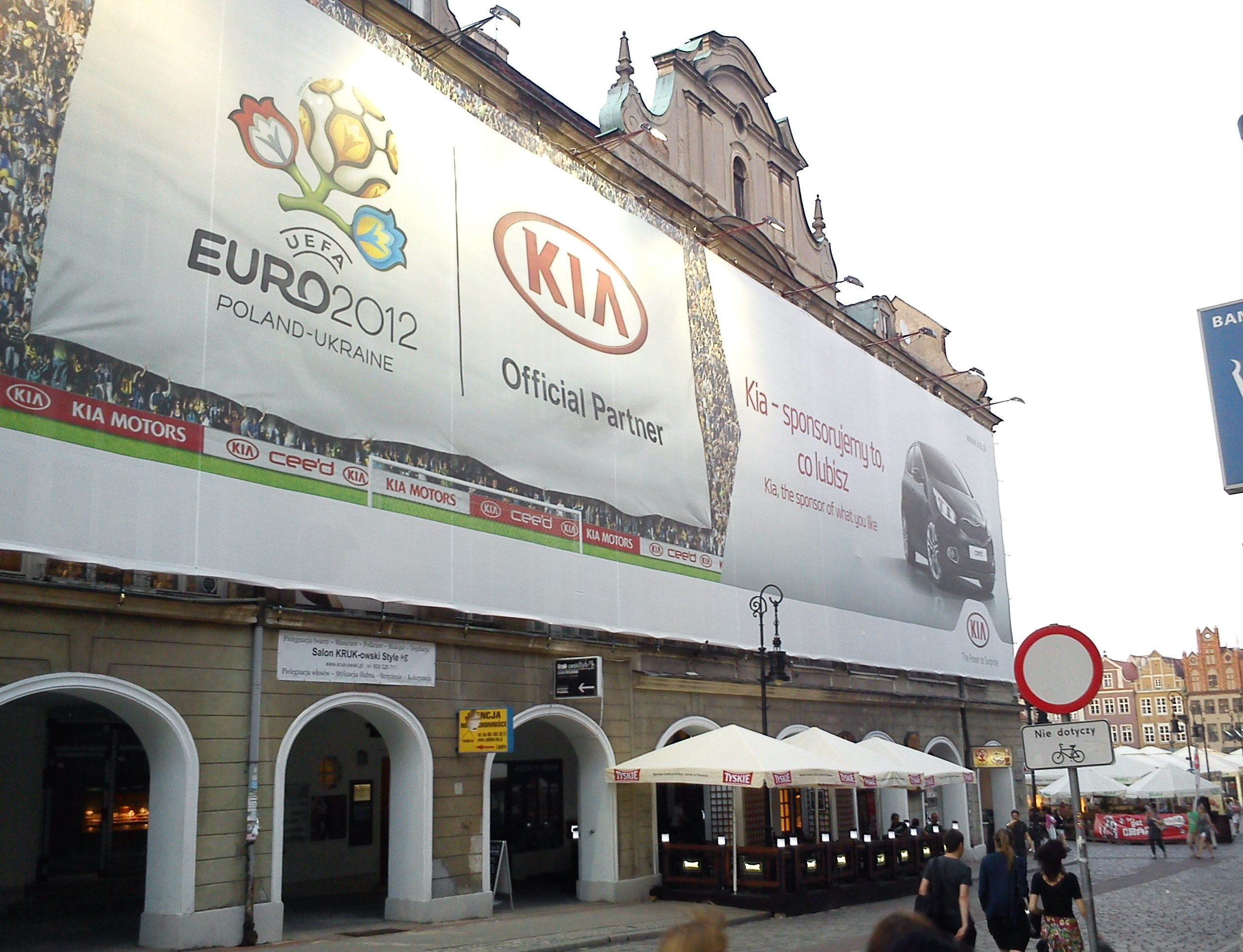
UEFA Euro 2012

Kia Motors sponsors the following sports teams, events, venues, and athletes:

=== Venues ===
- Kia Arena
- Kia Center
- Kia Forum
- Kia Oval

=== Sports associations ===
- League of Legends European Championship (LEC)
- Liga ACB
- National Basketball Association (NBA)
- National Rugby League (NRL)
- Women's National Basketball Association (WNBA)

=== Sports events ===
- Archery World Cup
- Asian Games
- Australian Open (tennis tournament)
- Copa América
- FIBA Asia Championship
- FIFA World Cup
- Kia Classic (LPGA)
- Kia Lotos Race
- Kia Super League (cricket)
- Korea Speed Festival
- Tennis Premier League (tennis tournament)
- UEFA Europa League
- Universiade
- X Games
- X Games Asia

=== Sports teams ===
- A.C. Monza (Italian association football team)
- AC Ajaccio (French football club, from 1999 to 2000)
- Atlanta Falcons
- Atlético Madrid (Spanish professional football club, from 2005 to 2011)
- B-SAD (Portugal association football team)
- Bengaluru FC (Indian professional Football Club, from 2018 to 2020)
- Boston United FC (English Football Club)
- Brisbane Broncos (National Rugby League)
- Canterbury-Bankstown Bulldogs (National Rugby League)
- Dplus KIA (South Korean professional esports organization)
- England women's cricket team
- FC Hansa Rostock (German association football team, from 1999 to 2002)
- FC Steaua București (Romanian association football team)
- Greater Western Sydney Giants (Australian Football League)
- Kia Forte (Shakey's V-League)
- Kia Picanto (Philippine Basketball Association)
- Kia Speed Skating Academy
- Kia Tigers (Korean Baseball Team in Gwangju, South Korea)
- Philippines national football team
- Qormi FC (Maltese association football team)
- Rogue (European professional esports organization)
- Slovakia national football team
- South Korea national speed skating team
- Surrey County Cricket Club
- Udinese Calcio (Italian association football team, from 2004 to 2006)
- Waikato Bay of Plenty Magic

=== Athletes ===
- Ryan Ford (MMA fighter)
- Fernando González (Chilean tennis player – 2004 & 2008 Olympic medalist)
- Badr Hari (Moroccan kickboxer)
- LeBron James (Global brand ambassador)
- Blake Griffin (NBA basketball player)
- Lee Sang-hwa (Speed skater)
- Yulia Lipnitskaya (Russian figure skater)
- Aliya Mustafina and Viktoria Komova (both Russian artistic gymnasts)
- Rafael Nadal (Global brand ambassador)
- Manny Pacquiao (Filipino boxer)
- Adelina Sotnikova (Russian figure skater)
- Michelle Wie (Official golf ambassador & spokesperson – KMA)
- Dylan Alcott (Australian tennis player)
- Eric Keogh (Kia Race Series winner 2 years in a row)

=== Actors ===
- Pierce Brosnan
- Laurence Fishburne
- Christopher Walken
- Tiger Shroff

=== Musicians ===
- Blackpink
- Chase Bryant
- Hyolyn
- Matthew Koma
- MisterWives
- Weezer

=== Music events ===
- Live at The chapel (Australian music concert)
- Vans Warped Tour
- YouTube Music Awards (2013)
- Melon Music Awards (2019)

=== Charity events ===
- We Can Be Heroes (joint-venture between Kia and DC Comics);

=== Entertainment ===
- Dick Clark's New Year's Rockin' Eve with Ryan Seacrest (2020–24)
- Inside the NBA
- Tobot
- X-Men

== Slogans ==
- The Car That Cares (2000–2005)
- The Power To Surprise (2005–2021)
- Give It Everything (2019–2021, United States)
- Movement that inspires (2021–present, Worldwide)

== See also ==
- List of Kia design and manufacturing facilities
- Automotive industry in South Korea
- Hyundai Motor Group
- Kia EcoDynamics
- Economy of South Korea
