= Jim Dunne =

American engineer and journalist (1931–2019)

Leo James 'Jim' Dunne
- Born: December 13, 1931; Detroit, Michigan, U.S.
- Died: August 19, 2019 (aged 87); Grosse Pointe Park, Detroit, Michigan
- Occupations: Automotive Spy Photographer; Editor Popular Mechanics; Contributor: Road & Track, Car and Driver, Automotive News, Autoweek, The Drive, and Motor Trend
- Writing career
- Genre: Automotive journalism

Jim Dunne (December 13, 1931 – August 19, 2019), was an American test-track engineer, journalist, editor, author and regular contributor to automotive publications, including Popular Science, Road & Track, Automotive News, Autoweek, The Drive, Motor Trend, Ward's Automotive, and Leftlane News. In addition to serving as Detroit editor of Popular Mechanics and Popular Science magazines, Dunne is widely known as one of the industry's preeminent automotive spy photographers.

Using telephoto lenses and carefully selected vantage sites, Dunne would secretly capture photographs of often remote and heavily disguised prototypes, test vehicles and early production cars years ahead of introduction, and selling the photographs to magazines and online sites. Manufacturers were known to, at times, plant decoys or set up forthcoming models, to generate media coverage.

As a noted presence in the automotive field and member of the Automotive Press Association, Dunne received Road & Travel Magazine's 2007 Lifetime Achievement Award. He recounted his career in his 2011 autobiography Car Spy.

Autoweek called Dunne the father of automotive spy photography, a profession he was ultimately credited with creating. Dunne retired, as the profession evaporated, gradually overtaken by the proliferation of smartphone cameras, shifting automotive spy work from professionals to amateur photographers everywhere.

== Background ==
Born Leo James Dunne in 1931, to Leo Augustine Dunne and Evelyn Thecla Normandin Dunne, Jim Dunne grew up in Detroit with nine siblings and lived his entire life in Detroit.

After graduating from Catholic Central High School in Detroit, Dunne studied at Wayne State University, receiving a bachelor's degree in Industrial Management. He subsequently served for three years in the United States Army during the Korean War.

In retrospect, Dunne credited his work with Intelligence and Reconnaissance during the war teaching him to work in harsh conditions, including the extreme heat and cold environments often sought for vehicle testing.

Dunne was married to Janet A. Dunne; together they had six daughters, two sons and 12 grandchildren. He was an avid sportsman and pursued fishing and tennis throughout his life. Dunne was 87 when he died in 2019 at his residence in Grosse Pointe Park from a rare and aggressive form of cancer that failed to respond to treatment.

== Career ==
Dunne began writing a column for national automotive magazines, at Popular Science and Popular Mechanics, emphasizing information that might reveal the nature of forthcoming but well-protected cars. Dunne co-wrote the Norbye/Dunne Report at Popular Science, with Jan P. Norbye (1931–2003), track-testing new vehicles for 13 years, soberly recording and noting a car's performance and creating a de facto template for subsequent automotive writers, outlining a car's performance, handling, acceleration, maneuverability, economy, and noise levels.

As editor for Popular Science, Dunne had been supplementing his written reports with photographs from new car introductions. Car and Driver would later report:

"his shots of the second-generation Chevy Corvair were different; they were snapped from a covert vantage point overlooking the fence of the secured General Motors proving grounds in Milford, Michigan—a hideout later dubbed Dunne’s Grove. The car was months away from its public reveal."

Looking for a competitive edge, Dunne surmised that taking photographs of cars that manufacturers wanted hidden, might make a good business.

He would become known as "cagey, patient, and adventurous", charismatic and fun-loving – with an overt bravado. Editor at Car and Driver, Rich Ceppos, called Dunne "quietly charismatic, fun-loving, adventurous, and mischievous."

As a journalist, he upheld basic professional standards and was known for his insistent, direct questioning in the face of evasive, less than straightforward responses from industry executives. Well known throughout the automotive industry, Dunne regularly invited other journalists to lunch, in and around Detroit to rehash industry events and predict what was ahead. These became known as "The Jim Dunne Lunches," or his “Predictions Lunches.” Dunne maintained cordial if competitive relationships with others in his profession, including noted automotive spy photographer Brenda Priddy.

== Career anecdotes ==
Using mock uniforms to gain covert access inside design labs, test facilities and headquarters, Dunne on one occasion wore a short-sleeve shirt, black tie, pocket protector and holding a clipboard – acted like he belonged and successfully gained access to a Chrysler facility – and as able to access and photograph top secret pilot models, under assembly.

At one time, Dunne was able to buy a parcel of land adjacent to the Chrysler testing facility, from which he was able to secure a regular supply of advance photographs – for years – until Chrysler discovered his location and erected a wall. Having purchased the property for a modest sum he was able to sell the parcel for 20 times what he'd purchased it for, donating the proceeds to his sister's convent. In jest, Chrysler would later name a small section of chain-link fencing at its Chelsea, MI, Proving Ground “The Dunne Fence.”

Leftlane News interviewed Dunne in a 2011 YouTube video, where he related he was intimately familiar with GM's Milford Proving Ground, which were close to where he lived. Dunne said "I've told drivers in the past when you drive down the north-south straightaway, please smile because your picture will probably be taken." Ultimately, GM would nickname a particularly vulnerable photography vantage after Dunne.

Once, with journalist David C. Smith, he and Dunne wondered if Henry Ford's notorious right hand man, Harry Bennett was still alive. They researched and found him living in Las Vegas. Together they interviewed and photographed Bennett for six hours.

Dunne famously once infiltrated an Oldsmobile Design studio, and on taking photos with his Minox camera, noticed he was interrupting an Olds executive, nearly in flagrante in the car with a secretary. Neither Dunne nor the executive said a word, as Dunne left with his spy shots.

Renault had once invited journalists to their company proving grounds outside Paris, where the journalists discovered a scale model of the facility, noting a lone plastic figure perched carefully in a well-located tree. The Renault executives noted “That’s Jim Dunne.”

Security offices around Detroit's manufacturing and testing sites carried "WANTED" posters of Dunne. He was ultimately sued numerous times, including for his expose of dubious devices marketed to offer dramatic fuel savings, and on one occasion he was investigated for stealing proprietary photographs.
