= Kia EcoDynamics =

EcoDynamics is an energy efficient subbrand of Kia Motors introduced with the Ray concept car at the 2010 Chicago Auto Show.
