= Road & Travel Magazine =

Online magazine

- American Woman Motorscene covers
- Editor-in-Chief: Courtney Caldwell
- Categories: Automobile, Travel, Climate Change Issues, Personal Safety on the Road
- Frequency: Monthly
- Publisher: Caldwell Communications, Inc.
- Founded: 1989
- Final issue: 2000 (print)
- Company: Caldwell Communications, Inc.
- Country: United States
- Based in: Los Angeles, CA
- Language: English
- Website: www.roadandtravel.com

Road & Travel Magazine (RTM) was an online magazine focusing on automotive, travel, climate change and personal safety issues with a slant towards women. The magazine had its headquarters in Los Angeles, CA.

== History ==
Road & Travel Magazine was founded in 1989 by Courtney Caldwell under the name American Woman Motorscene. AWM was the first magazine to address the women's automotive market. Pursuing a connection between auto and travel, editors began adding travel content to expand the magazine's audience.

In 2000, AWM became one of the first print publications to transition to an online format. At that time, changed the name to American Woman Road & Travel to more accurately reflect the magazine's editorial content.

As the online version began to gain reader traction worldwide, American Woman was dropped from the title to avoid alienation of non-US and male readership, finally resulting in Road & Travel Magazine, a title that more accurately reflected its lifestyle content to a worldwide audience with an interest in automotive, travel, climate and personal safety topics.

In 2008, RTM added a section dedicated to environmental topics as they related to auto and travel. In 2017, RTM further expanded its content to include the RV and Camping lifestyle markets.

As of 2025 November 26, the online edition of this magazine is defunct. It's URL returns a page on Plesk, a website hosting service indicating that "This page is generated by Plesk, the leading hosting automation software.

You see this page because there is no Web site at this address."

== Editorial direction ==
Road & Travel's primary target audience is women between 25 and 59. Caldwell's editorial vision for RTM was an automotive magazine for the average consumer, one that was not geared toward car enthusiasts, therefore making it the rare lifestyle magazine that targets everyday "in-market" consumers—those looking for information on purchasing autos, trip planning, and safety on the road.

== Awards ==
International Car of the Year Awards In 1996, Road & Travel Magazine launched its annual International Car of the Year Awards (ICOTY) honoring ten new vehicles in ten categories for the upcoming new model year. ICOTY awards became the first awards to honor new vehicles from a theme that reflected lifestyle and life stage; focusing on the emotionally compelling experience consumers have during car buying and ownership. The categories that make up the ICOTY awards are:

- International Car of the Year
- International Truck of the Year
- SUV of the Year - Most Resourceful
- Sedan of the Year - Most Dependable
- Luxury Car of the Year - Most Respected
- Pick Up Truck of the Year - Most Athletic
- Crossover of the Year - Most Versatile
- Sports Car of the Year - Most Sex Appeal
- Minivan of the Year - Most Compatible
- Entry-Level Car of the Year - Most Spirited

Qualifications include vehicles manufactured by American, British, German, Japanese, Korean and Swedish automakers but are sold in America. In order to achieve a balanced perspective on voting that reflects all consumers, not just one gender, RTM engages a diverse group of 12 men and women renowned automotive journalists from the U.S. and Canada in the voting process. This jury of respected writers represents such publications as the Robb Report, Edmunds.com, Winding Road, MSN Autos, AutoWeek, NY Times, and Autoline Detroit. J.D. Power and Associates tabulates votes to ensure credibility and validity. The annual event takes place in Detroit at the onset of press week for the North American International Auto Show (NAIAS). The event is televised by the local CBS affiliate, WWJ-TV and is presented as a TV special on opening weekend of the NAIAS to consumers.

Lifetime Achievement Award

In 2004, Road & Travel Magazine introduced an award to honor automotive journalists who have achieved a lifetime of contributions to the automotive industry. The award was designed to acknowledge the talents of those journalists whose lifetime of contributions have helped enrich the world of automobiles. Past recipients include: Denise McCluggage, Jerry Flint, David E. Davis, Jr. and Jim Dunne. (In 1958, McCluggage appeared as a guest challenger on the TV panel show "To Tell The Truth".)

== See also ==
- Sports Car International
