= International Car of the Year =

The International Car of the Year (ICOTY) awards are one of several annual "car of the year" awards around the world for new automobile models judged to be the best of their generation. This award is presented by the United States magazine Road & Travel Magazine. Awards are given under ten different categories to new vehicles manufactured internationally and available on the US market. The awards ceremony is attended by 600 industry leaders and media on the evening before Press Days at the North American International Auto Show (NAIAS). The awards have been presented annually since 1997. Some winners from 2007 till 2016 are listed below:

== 2016 Winners ==
Car of the year: Mazda MX-5

== 2015 Winners ==
Car of the year:Kia K900

== 2014 Winners ==
Car of the year:Kia Cadenza
Truck of Year:Ford Ranger
Earth, Wind & Power Car of the Year:Toyota Corolla
Earth, Wind & Power Truck of the Year:Audi Q5

== 2013 Winners ==
Car of the year:Kia Optima
Truck of Year:Ford Ranger
Earth, Wind & Power Car of the Year:Dodge Dart
Earth, Wind & Power Truck of the Year:Volvo XC60

== 2012 Winners ==
Car of the year:Audi A7
Truck of Year:Range Rover Evoque
Sedan: Toyota Camry
Sporty Coupe:Hyundai Veloster
Sports Car:Porsche 911
Compact: Ford Focus
Minivan: Honda Odyssey
EWP Car of Year:Volkswagen Passat TDI

== 2011 Winners ==
Car of the Year: Hyundai Sonata
Truck of the Year: Kia Sportage
SUV of the Year: Ford Explorer
Sedan of the Year: Volvo S60
Luxury Car: Jaguar XJ

== 2010 Winners ==
Car of the Year: Ford Taurus
Truck of the Year: Volvo XC60

== 2009 Winners ==
Car of the Year: Nissan GT-R
Truck of the Year:Dodge Ram 1500
Environmentally friendly Car: Volkswagen Jetta TDI
Environmentally friendly Truck: Ford Escape Hybrid

== 2008 Winners ==
Car of the Year: Honda Accord sedan
Truck of the Year: Dodge Ram 2500
SUV of the Year: Chevrolet Tahoe Hybrid
Sedan of the Year: Honda Accord
Luxury Car: Mercedes-Benz C63 AMG
Most Respected: Mercedes-Benz C63 AMG
Pickup Truck of the Year: GMC SierraDenali
Crossover: Buick Enclave
Sports car of the Year: Audi R8
Minivan of the Year: Chrysler Town & Country
Entry-level: Volvo C30

== 2007 Winners ==
Car of the Year: Lexus LS 460
Truck of the Year: Chevrolet Silverado
SUV of the Year: GMC Yukon
Sedan of the Year: Toyota Camry
Luxury Car: Lexus LS 460
Most Respected: Lexus LS 460
Pickup Truck of the Year: Chevrolet Silverado
Crossover: Mazda CX-7
Sports car of the Year: Jaguar XK
Minivan of the Year: Ford Freestar
Entry-level: Mazdaspeed3

== 2006 Winners ==
Car of the Year: Dodge Charger
Truck of the Year: Hummer H3
Pickup of the Year – “Most Athletic”: Honda Ridgeline
Sports Car of the Year – “Most Sex Appeal”: Pontiac Solstice
Sedan of the Year – “Most Dependable”: Honda Accord
Luxury Car of the Year – “Most Respected”: Mercedes-Benz CLS500
Minivan of the Year – “Most Compatible”: Honda Odyssey
Entry-Level Car of the Year – “Most Spirited”: Audi A3
Crossover of the Year – “Most Versatile”: BMW M3
SUV of the Year – “Most Resourceful”:
Ford Explorer (tie)
Land Rover Range Rover Sport (tie)

== 2005 Winners ==
Car of the Year: Honda Civic EX
Truck of the Year: Hummer H2 SUT
Most Sex Appeal/Sports Car: Chevy Corvette
Most Dependable/Sedan: Subaru Legacy 2.5i
Most Spirited/Entry-Level: MINI Cooper Convertible
Most Compatible/Minivan: Chrysler Town & Country
Most Versatile/Crossover: Dodge Magnum
Most Respected/Luxury Car: Jaguar XJ LWB
Most Athletic/Pickup Truck: Ford F-250 SuperDuty
Most Resourceful/SUV: Land Rover LR3

== See also ==
- Car of the Year (disambiguation page)
- World Car of the Year
- North American Car of the Year
- European Car of the Year
- Canadian Car of the Year
- International Engine of the Year
- List of motor vehicle awards
