= Elsinore (disambiguation) =

Elsinore or Helsingør is a Danish city.

Elsinore may also refer to:

== Businesses and organizations ==
- Elsinore (company), a company that began as a subsidiary of Hyatt Hotels Corporation
- Elsinore Technologies Inc., a software company, maker of Visual Intercept
- Elsinore Multimedia, a software and video game developer in Hollywood, Florida, U.S.

== Edifices and features ==
- Elsinore Castle or Kronborg, a castle in Helsingør, the setting for William Shakespeare's play Hamlet
- Elsinore Arch, a stone arch in Cincinnati, Ohio, U.S.
- Elsinore Theatre, a historic movie theatre in Salem, Oregon, U.S.

== Places ==
=== Canada ===
- Elsinore, Edmonton, a neighbourhood in Edmonton, Alberta
- Elsinore, Ontario, a community in Ontario

=== United States ===
- Lake Elsinore, California, a city
  - Lake Elsinore
  - Elsinore Valley
  - Elsinore Trough
  - Elsinore Fault Zone
- Elsinore, Utah, a town

== Transportation ==
=== Aircraft ===
- Elsonore, an Armstrong Whitworth Ensign aircraft

=== Motorcycles ===
- Honda MR50 Elsinore (1974–1975), an off-road mini cycle
- Honda CR250M Elsinore (1973–1976), a two-stroke motorcycle
  - Honda CR125M Elsinore, a smaller version of the CR250M

=== Ships ===
- SS Elsinore, a 1913 steam tanker for the Union Oil Company
- Elsinore (steamboat), a steam launch used in the state of Washington, U.S.

== Other uses ==
- Elsinore (comics), an American comic book limited series
- Elsinore (film), a British film about the life of Ian Charleson
- Elsinore (video game), a time loop adventure game following the events of Hamlet
- Elsinore, Pomona and Los Angeles Railway, part of the Southern California Railway
- Elsinore Sewing Club, a Danish organization that transported Jews to safety during World War II

== See also ==
- Hamlet at Elsinore, a 1964 television production
- Helsingor (disambiguation)
- The Mutiny of the Elsinore (novel), a novel by Jack London
