= Honda Passport =

Mid-size SUV

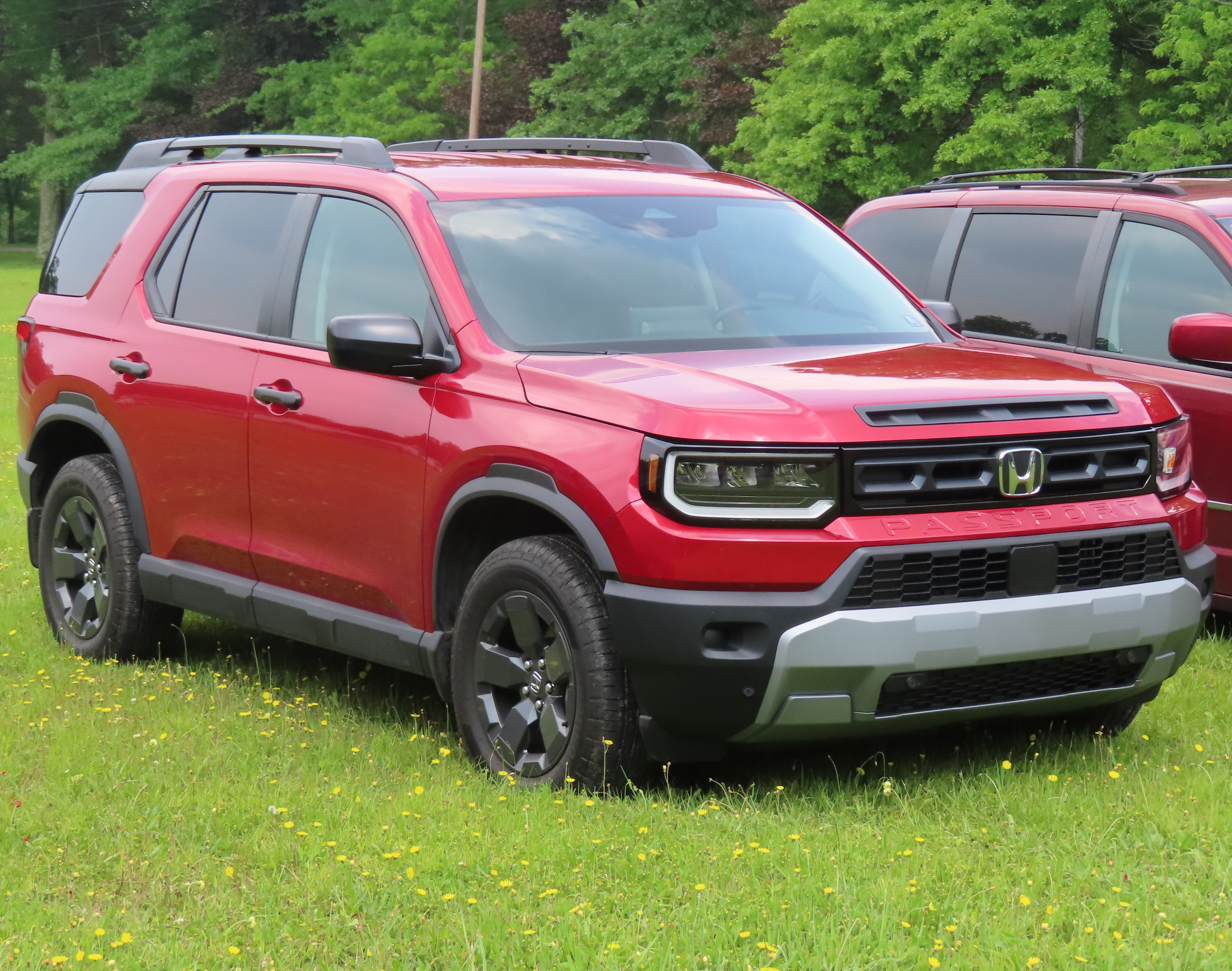
- Fourth generation Honda Passport

Overview
- Manufacturer: Honda
- Production: 1993–2002; 2018–present
- Model years: 1994–2002; 2019–present

Body and chassis
- Class: Mid-size SUV (1994–2002); Mid-size crossover SUV (2019–present)
- Body style: 5-door SUV
- Layout: Front-engine, rear-wheel-drive (1994–2002); Front-engine, front-wheel-drive (2019–2022); Front-engine, four-wheel-drive (1994–present)
- Chassis: Body-on-frame (1994–2002); Unibody (2019–present)

The Honda Passport (Japanese: ホンダ・パスポート, Hepburn: Honda Pasupōto) is a line of sport utility vehicles (SUV) from the Japanese automaker Honda. Originally, it was a rebadged version of the Isuzu Rodeo, a mid-size SUV sold between 1993 and 2002. It was introduced in 1993 for the 1994 model year as Honda's first entry into the growing SUV market of the 1990s in the United States. The first and second generation Passport was manufactured by Subaru Isuzu Automotive in Lafayette, Indiana. Like various other Honda models, it re-used a name from their motorcycle division, the Honda C75 Passport. The other two name candidates were Elsinore and Odyssey, the latter would be re-used a year later on a minivan.

The Passport was a part of a partnership between Isuzu and Honda in the 1990s, which saw an exchange of passenger vehicles from Honda to Isuzu, such as the Isuzu Oasis, and trucks from Isuzu to Honda, such as the Passport and Acura SLX. This arrangement was convenient for both companies, as Isuzu discontinued passenger car production in 1993 after a corporate restructuring, and Honda was in desperate need of an SUV, a segment that was growing in popularity in North America as well as Japan during the 1990s. The partnership ended in 2002 with the discontinuation of the Passport in favor of the Honda-engineered Pilot.

The Passport nameplate returned as a two-row mid-size crossover SUV slotted between the CR-V and Pilot for the 2019 model year. The third-generation Passport was unveiled at the Los Angeles Auto Show on November 27, 2018. It is built at Honda's factory in Lincoln, Alabama.

The Passport will be sold in Japan starting 2026.

== First generation (C58; 1994) ==
First generation
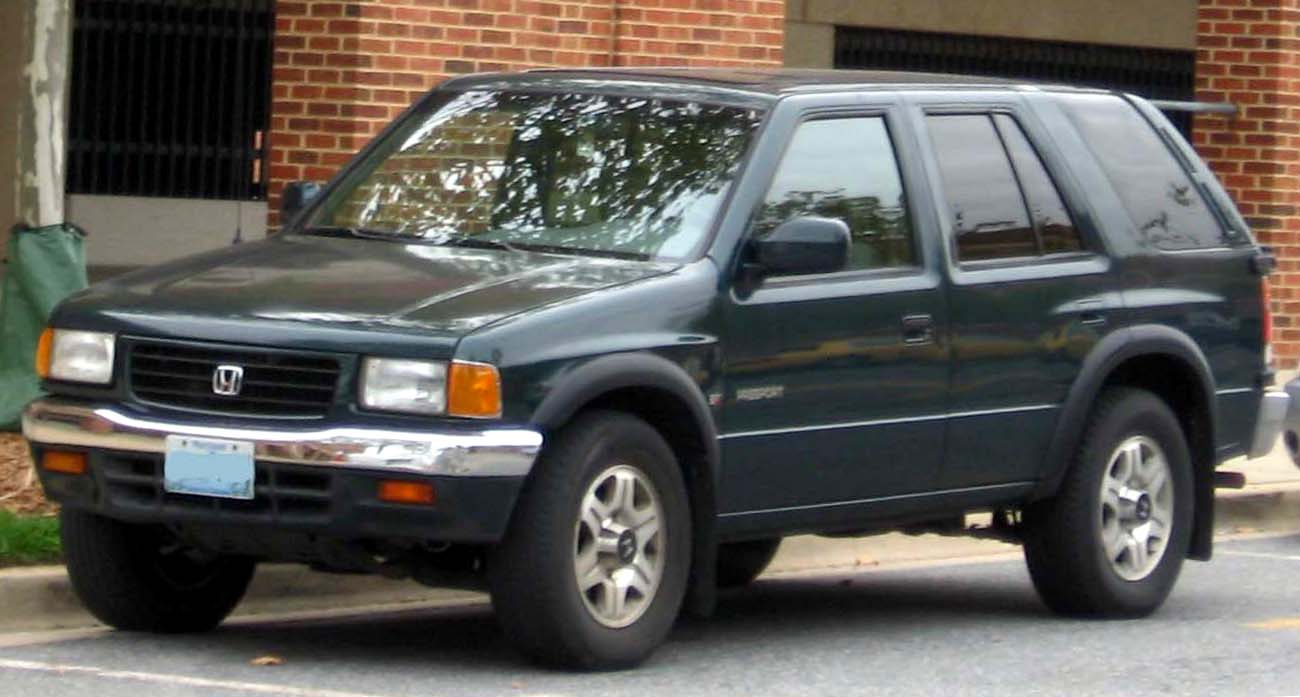

Overview
- Model code: C58
- Production: 1993–1997
- Model years: 1994–1997
- Assembly: United States: Lafayette, Indiana (Subaru Isuzu Automotive)

Body and chassis
- Layout: Front-engine, rear-wheel-drive; Front-engine, four-wheel-drive
- Chassis: Body-on-frame
- Related: Isuzu Rodeo

Powertrain
- Engine: 2.6 L 4ZE1 I4; 3.2 L 6VD1 V6 (EX)
- Power output: 89.5 kW (120 hp; 122 PS) (2.6 L); 130.5–142 kW (175–190 hp; 177–193 PS) (3.2 L)
- Transmission: 5-speed manual; 4-speed automatic

Dimensions
- Wheelbase: 108.5 in (2,756 mm)
- Length: 176.5 in (4,483 mm)
- Width: 66.5 in (1,689 mm); 68.5 in (1,740 mm) (EX)
- Height: 65.5 in (1,664 mm); 66.3 in (1,684 mm) (EX)

The first generation Passport was offered in three trims, the base model DX, mid-range LX, and upscale EX. DX models had a 5-speed manual transmission, rear-wheel-drive (RWD) layout and a 2.6 L four-cylinder engine producing 89.5 kW (120 hp; 122 PS). LX models could be had with an optional 4-speed automatic transmission, optional four-wheel-drive (4WD) and a 3.2 L V6 engine producing 130.5 kW (175 hp; 177 PS) as standard. The upscale EX offered the 3.2 L V6 engine and four-wheel-drive as standard. Some first generation Passports were equipped with a rear axle built by General Motors. Others had a Dana 44 rear axle.

=== Model year changes ===
- In 1994, for the 1995 model year, the Passport received driver and front passenger airbags. EX trims gained extra equipment and features.
- In 1995, for the 1996 model year, the 3.2 L V6 was upgraded from 130.5 kW (175 hp; 177 PS) to 142 kW (190 hp; 193 PS). A shift-on-the-fly four-wheel-drive system became available.
- In 1996, for the 1997 model year, the DX trim was dropped. The 2.6 L engine option was also dropped. All models were powered by the V6 engine.

== Second generation (CK58/CM58/DM58; 1998) ==
Second generation
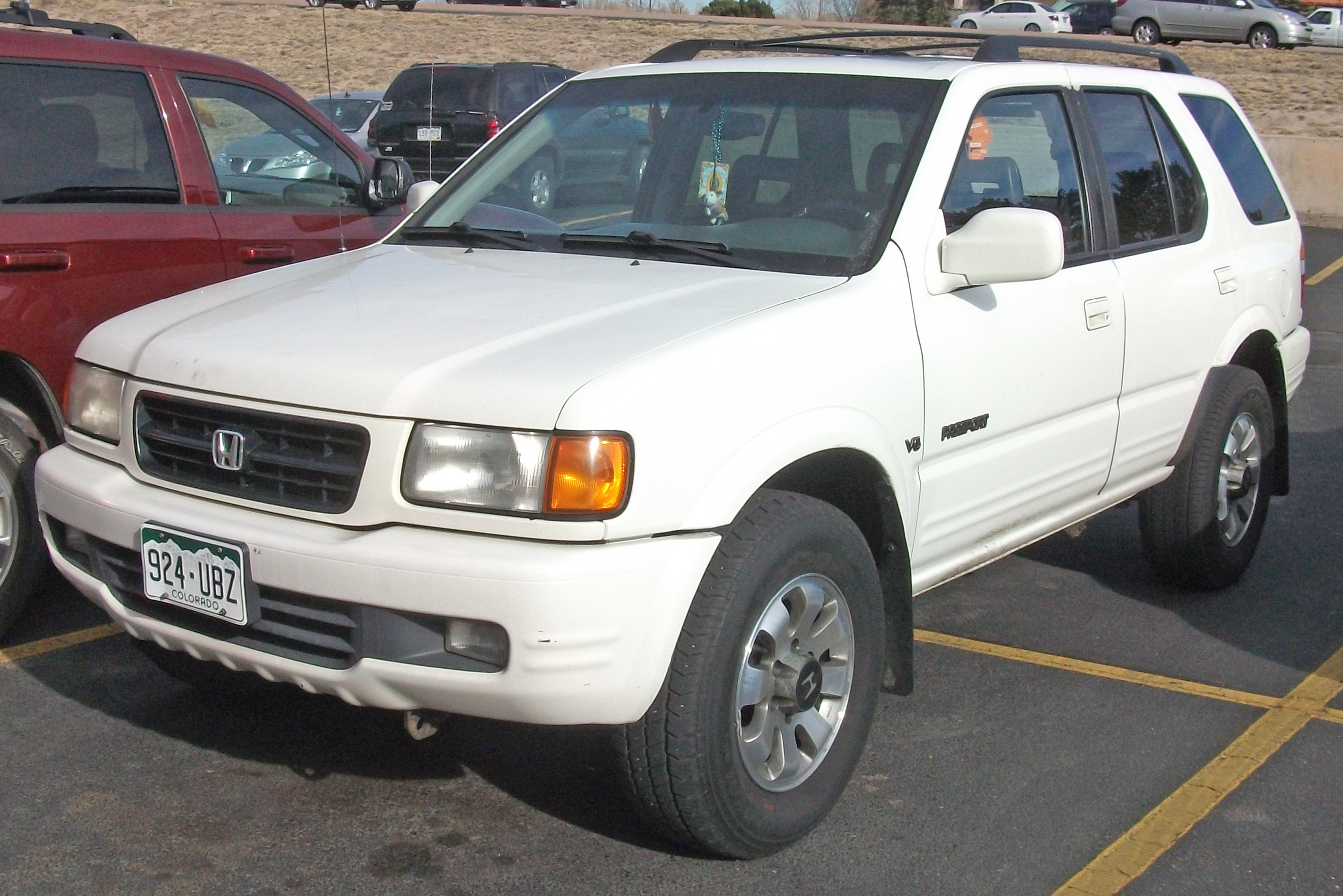
- Honda Passport V6 (pre-facelift)

Overview
- Model code: CK58; CM58; DM58
- Production: 1997 – March 2002
- Model years: 1998–2002
- Assembly: United States: Lafayette, Indiana (Subaru Isuzu Automotive)

Body and chassis
- Layout: Front-engine, rear-wheel-drive; Front-engine, four-wheel-drive
- Chassis: Body-on-frame
- Related: Isuzu Rodeo; Isuzu Axiom

Powertrain
- Engine: 3.2 L 6VD1 V6
- Transmission: 5-speed manual; 4-speed automatic

Dimensions
- Wheelbase: 106.4 in (2,703 mm)
- Length: 177.4 in (4,506 mm) (1998–1999); 178.2 in (4,526 mm) (2000–2002); 184.1 in (4,676 mm) (1998–1999 EX); 184.2 in (4,679 mm) (2000–2002 EX)
- Width: 70.4 in (1,788 mm); 71.1 in (1,806 mm) (2000-2002 EX)
- Height: 68.5 in (1,740 mm) (1998-1999 EX); 68.8 in (1,748 mm) (2000-2002)

For the second generation model, two trim levels were offered: LX and upscale EX. EX had the spare tire below the cargo area and LX mounted in a swing carrier at rear. Minor changes for the 2000 model year included the introduction of an even more upscale EX-L trim which added leather seats, 2-tone exterior colors, and a CD changer. The LX trim received an optional set of 16 in (406 mm) wheels.

In 2010, a recall was issued for affected 1998-2002 Rodeo and Passport for frames with severe rust issues. On September 22, 2010, NHTSA campaign number 10V436000 was issued to recall 149,992 vehicles because of excessive corrosion near the forward bracket for the left or right rear suspension lower link. If the rust damage was severe, Honda bought back the vehicles from their owners.

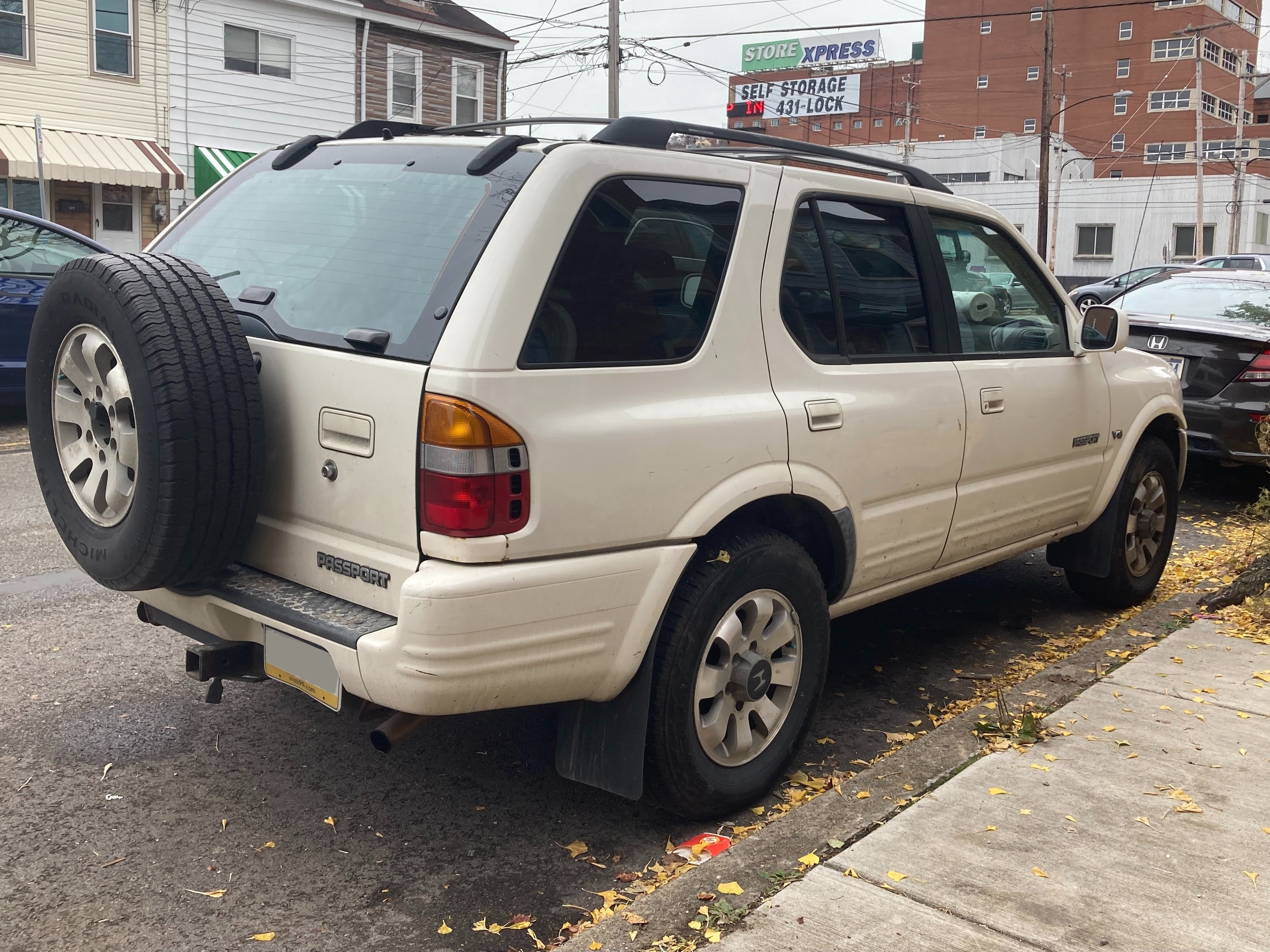
Rear view

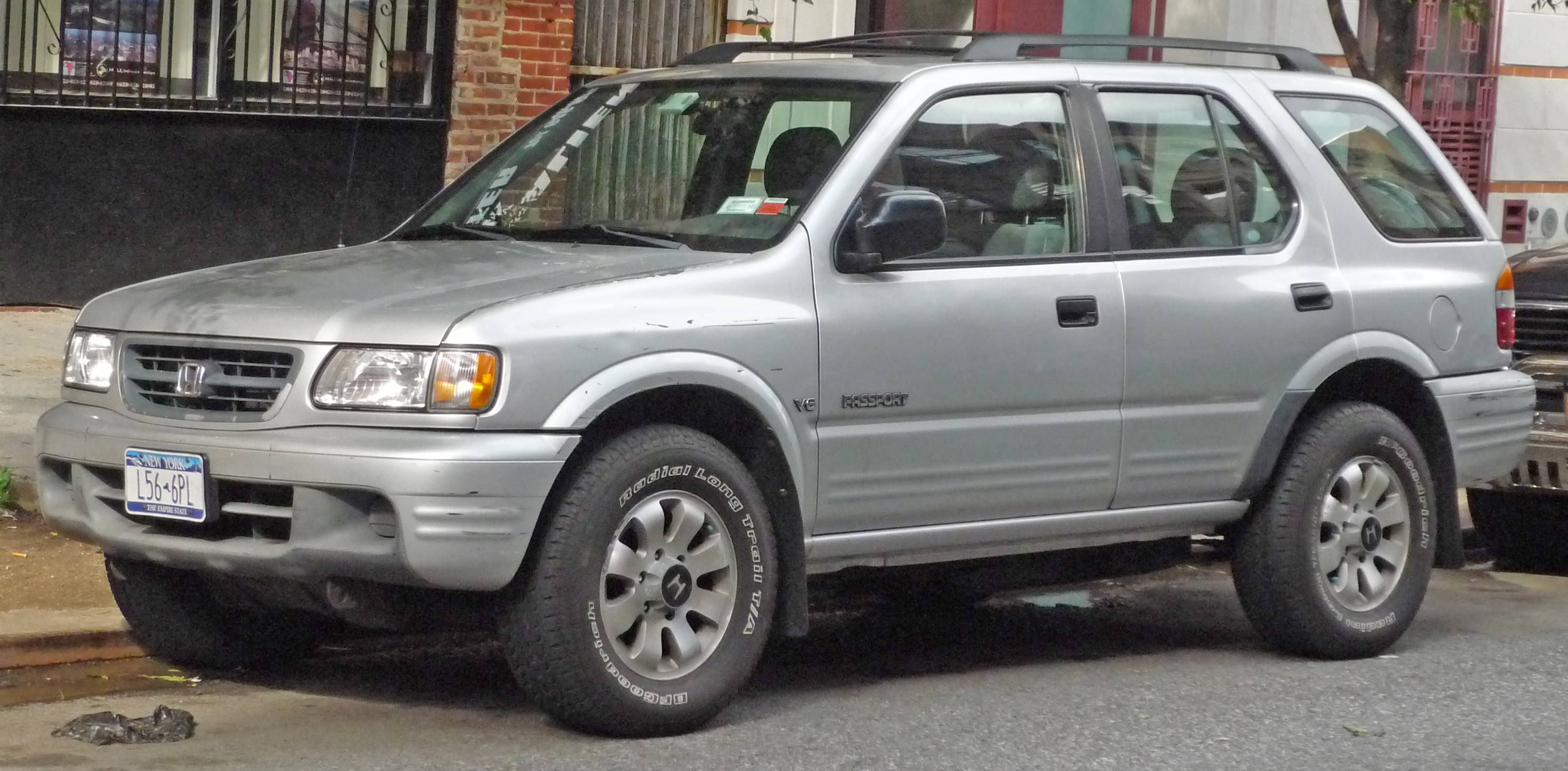
Honda Passport V6 (facelift)

== Third generation (YF7/8; 2019) ==
Third generation
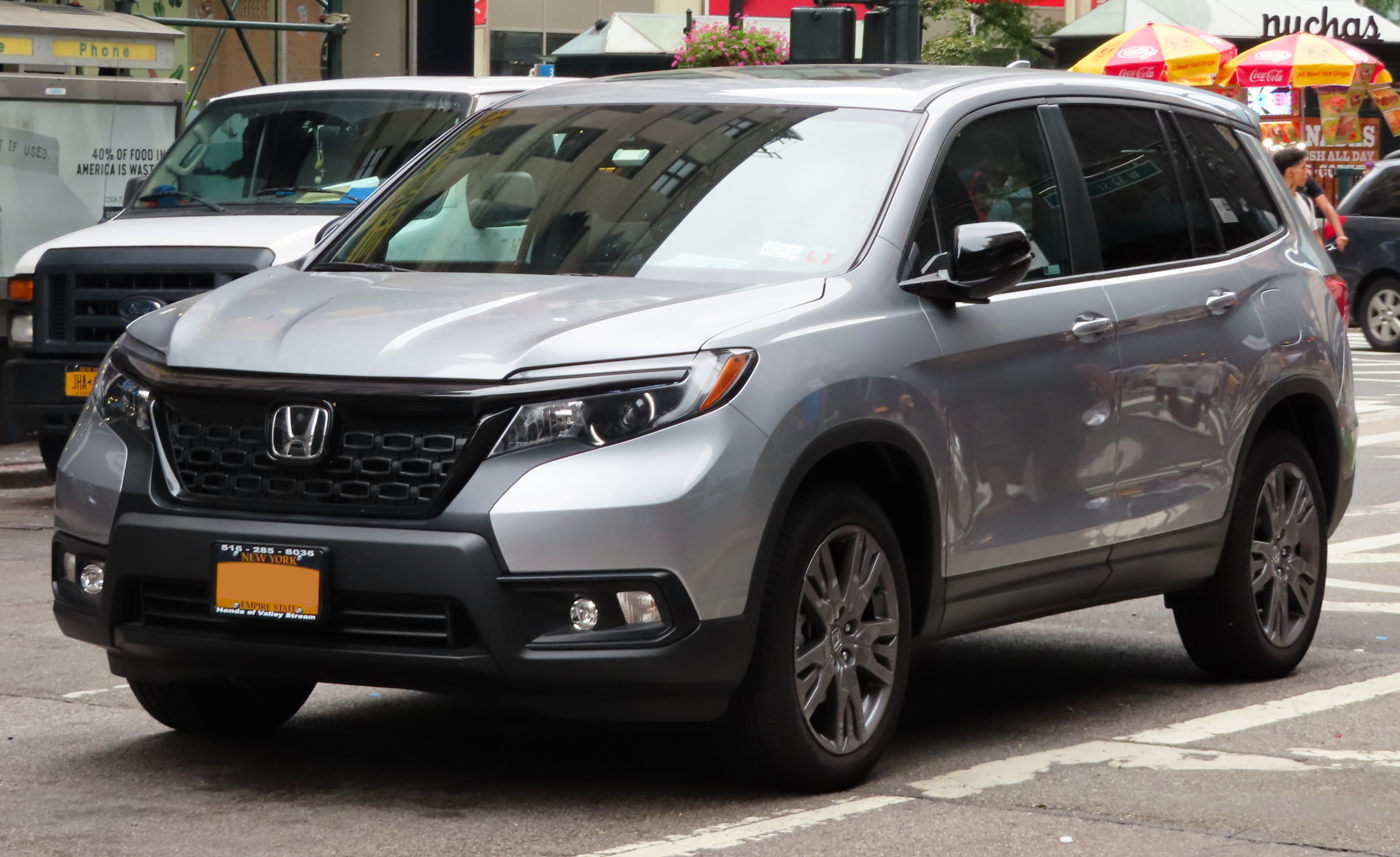
- 2019 Honda Passport EX-L AWD (pre-facelift)

Overview
- Model code: YF7; YF8
- Production: December 2018 – March 2025
- Model years: 2019–2025
- Assembly: United States: Lincoln, Alabama (Honda Manufacturing of Alabama)

Body and chassis
- Layout: Front-engine, front-wheel-drive; Front-engine, four-wheel-drive
- Platform: Global Light Truck Platform 2 (GLTP2)
- Chassis: Unibody
- Related: Honda Pilot; Honda Ridgeline; Honda Odyssey; Acura MDX

Powertrain
- Engine: 3.5 L J35Y6 V6
- Transmission: 9-speed ZF 9HP automatic

Dimensions
- Wheelbase: 111.0 in (2,819 mm)
- Length: 190.5 in (4,839 mm)
- Width: 78.6 in (1,996 mm)
- Height: 71.6 in (1,819 mm)

The third generation Passport was unveiled at the Los Angeles Auto Show on November 27, 2018, with retail sales starting in February 2019 for the 2019 model year. Unlike previous generations, it was designed in the United States and is manufactured in Lincoln, Alabama alongside the Honda Pilot. It is based on the third-generation Honda Pilot, although the Passport is shorter in length and loses the Pilot's third-row seating. The Passport slots between the smaller CR-V and longer Pilot, filling the gap left when the Honda Crosstour was discontinued after the 2015 model year. The Passport competes against 2-row five-seater midsize crossovers like the Chevrolet Blazer, Ford Edge, Nissan Murano, and Hyundai Santa Fe.

Trim levels at launch included the base "Sport", mid-level "EX-L", "Touring", and the top-of-the-line "Elite”. Unlike most other Honda nameplates like the CR-V and Pilot, the Passport does not have an LX trim. Consequently, the price of the Passport in Sport trim started above that of the contemporary Pilot in LX trim. All trim levels included front-wheel drive (FWD) as standard equipment, with all-wheel drive (AWD) optional, except for the "Elite", where it is standard equipment.

All Passport models are equipped with a 3.5L J35Y6 V6 producing 280 hp (209 kW; 284 PS) and 262 lb⋅ft (355 N⋅m); paired with a nine-speed, push button-controlled automatic transmission also found in the Ridgeline and Pilot. Front-wheel drive is standard; Honda's all-wheel drive system, dubbed i-VTM4 (Intelligent Variable Torque Management), is optional, and features drive settings for Normal, Sand, Snow, and Mud. A two-speed transfer case is not available. Ground clearance is 7.5 in (191 mm) for front-wheel drive models and 8.1 in (206 mm) for all-wheel drive models and the Passport can tow up to 5,000 pounds (2,300 kg).

Two rows of seats provide room for five passengers. There is 41 cubic feet (1,200 L) of storage behind the rear seat, which increases to 78 cubic feet (2,200 L) with the rear seat folded.

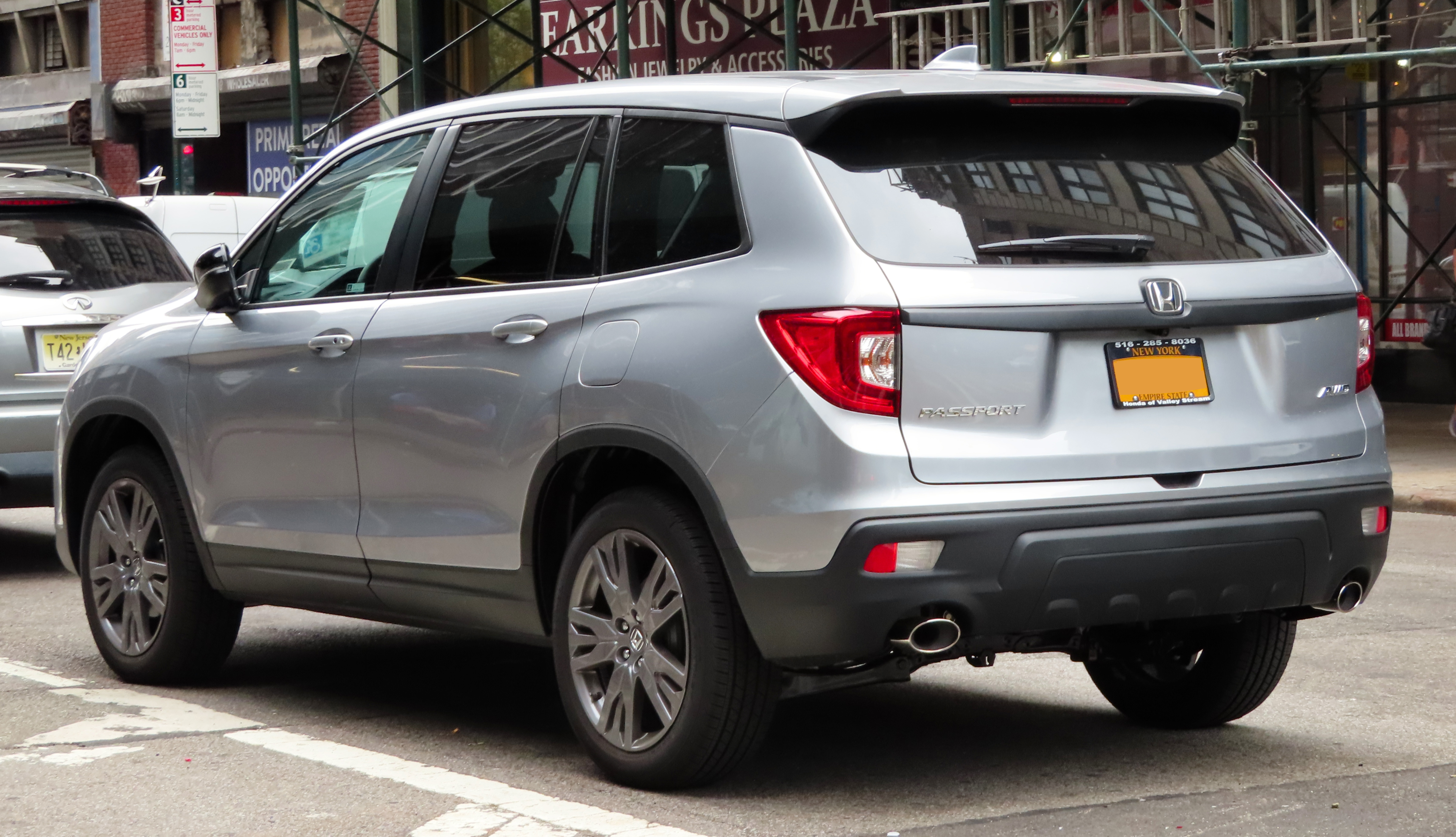
Rear view

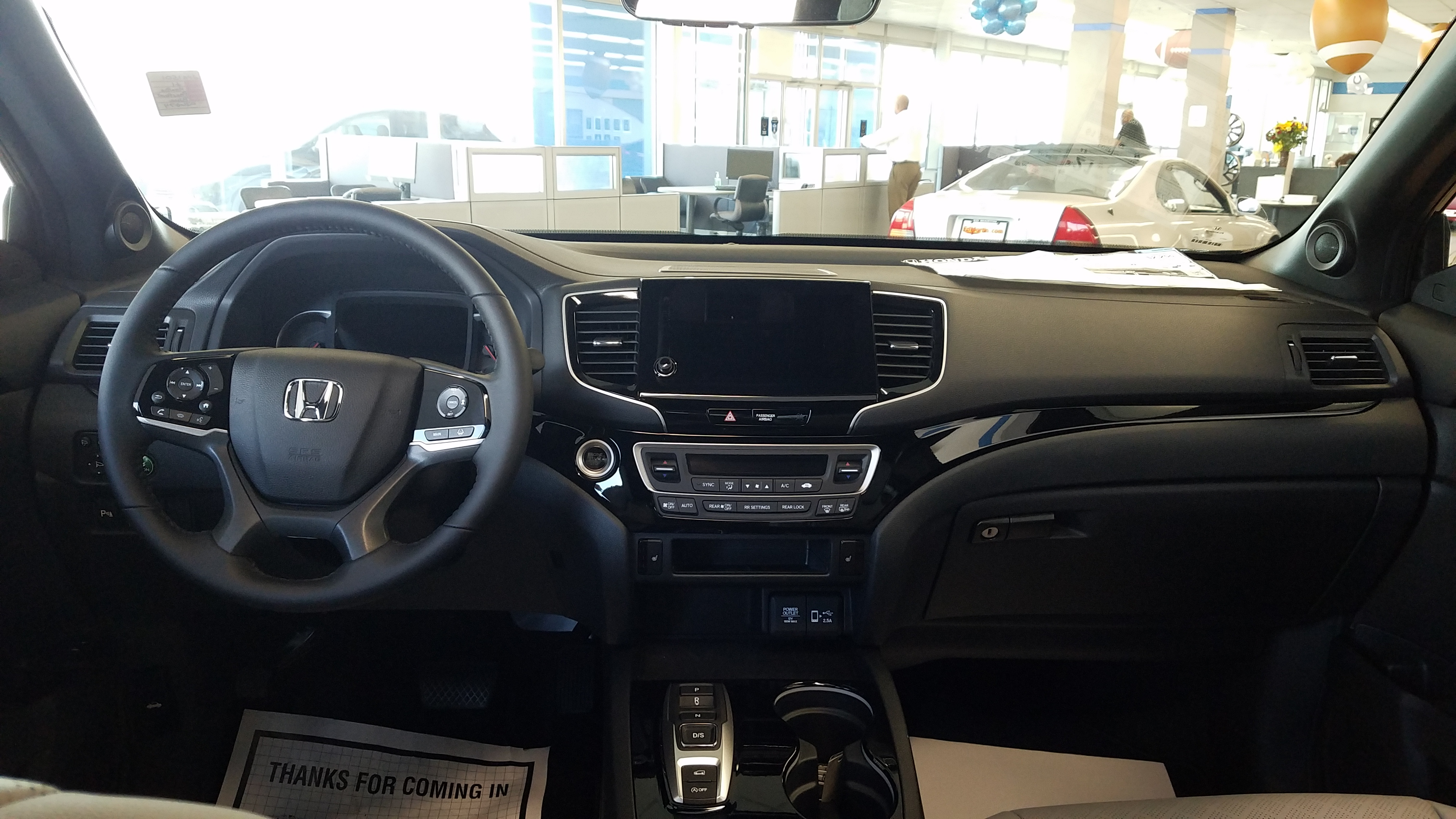
Interior

=== Marketing ===
On April 1, 2019, Honda released a YouTube advertisement for the 2019 Passport. The advertisement featured a 2019 Passport, called the "Past-Port", with a first-generation Passport's interior, touting features that were popular in the mid-to-late-1990s, including automatic power windows, an audio system with cassette player and cassette adapter and pager holder. The advertisement features an actor wearing 1990s-era clothing, and holding a Motorola cellular phone. Viewers of the advertisement could also call a special toll free number, 1-833-PAST-PORT (1-833-727-8767), where they would be greeted by a voice message from Fred Savage, and could then leave a voicemail on Honda's microcassette answering machine explaining why they would like to own a 2019 Past-Port. The advertisement is no longer viewable on Honda's YouTube channel as of May 2019, and the toll free number is no longer in service.

=== Model year changes ===
In October 2020, for the 2021 model year, all trims received the 8-inch touchscreen and Apple CarPlay and Android Auto as standard equipment.

The Passport was facelifted in November 2021 for the 2022 model year with a new front end design similar to the facelifted second-generation Honda Ridgeline as well as the addition of a new TrailSport trim level that offers a more aggressive off-road-oriented appearance package. The TrailSport model receives model specific bumpers, cosmetic skid plate inserts, all-weather TrailSport-logoed floormats, as well as all-season tires with a more aggressive shoulder tread. For the 2022 model year, the Sport and Touring trims were also dropped, leaving a simplified lineup of three trims: EX-L, TrailSport and Elite.

In 2022, for the 2023 model year, the front-wheel drive EX-L option was discontinued from the lineup, therefore all-wheel drive became standard on all Passport models.

In October 2023, for the 2024 model year, changes include a larger center console and new armrest. The top Elite trim has been replaced with the Black Edition trim.

=== Passport TrailSport (2022) ===
The TrailSport trim was introduced in September 2021 for the 2022 model year, and is the first TrailSport model in the Honda lineup. The Passport TrailSport comes standard with an all-wheel drive (AWD) system that is tuned for off-road use. Also included are more aggressively-styled tires, rugged exterior styling, a synthetic leather (leatherette)-trimmed interior that is easier to clean, unique orange stitching on the interior, and all-weather front and rear floor mats. The TrailSport is based on the equipment of the EX-L trim.

In October 2023, for the 2024 model year, the TrailSport receives trim-specific suspension retuning and all-terrain tires.

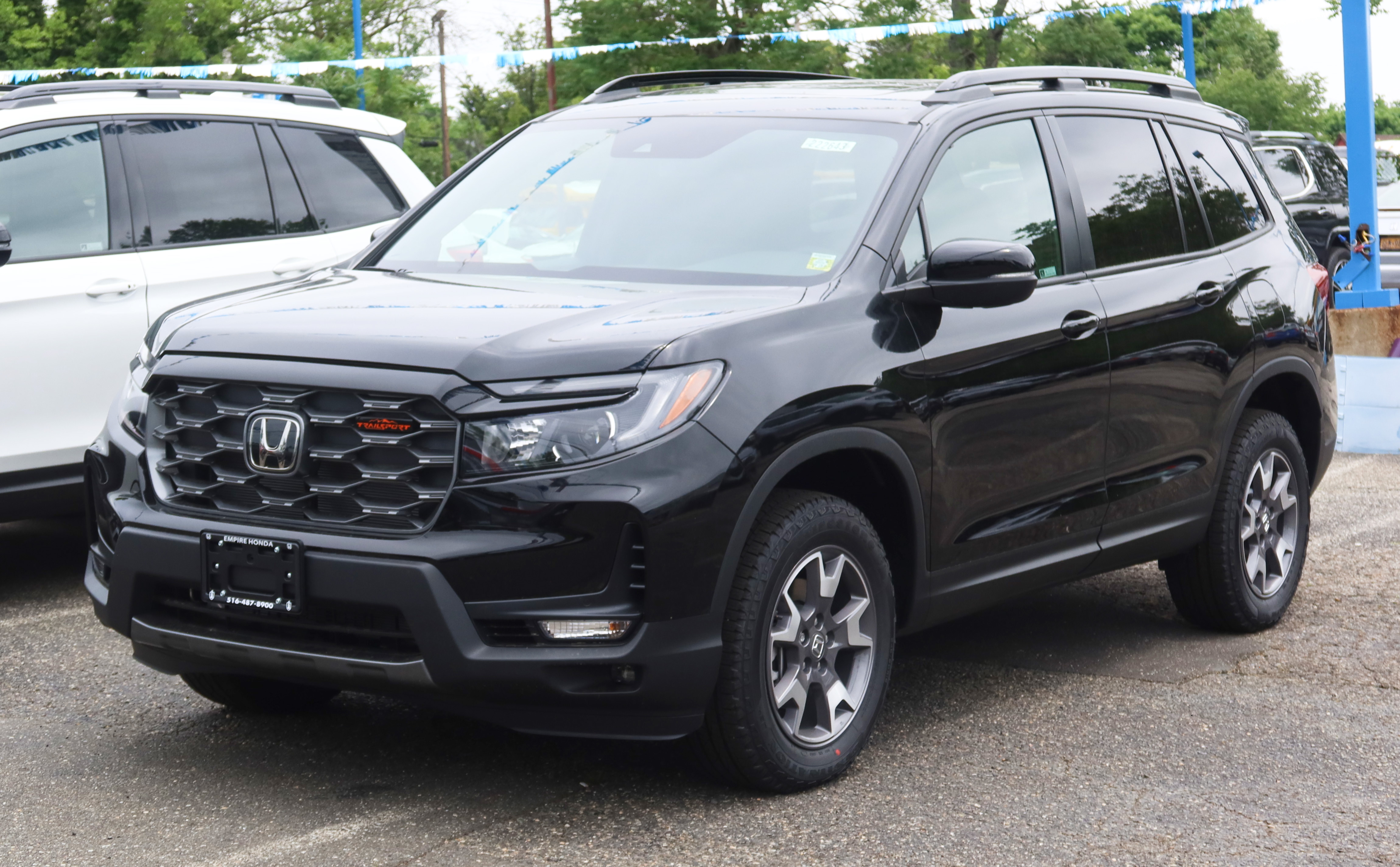
2022 Honda Passport TrailSport (facelift)

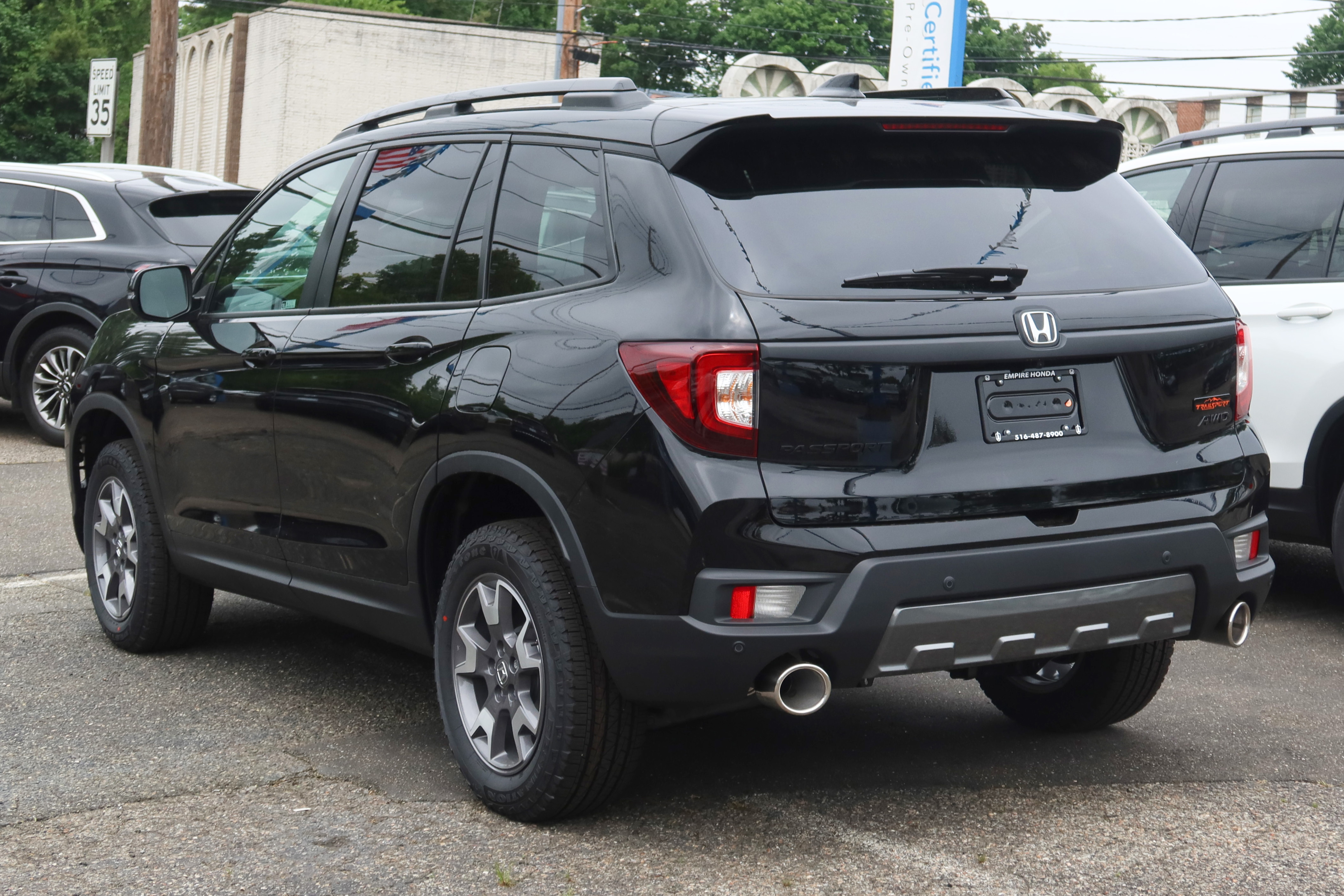
2022 Honda Passport TrailSport (facelift)

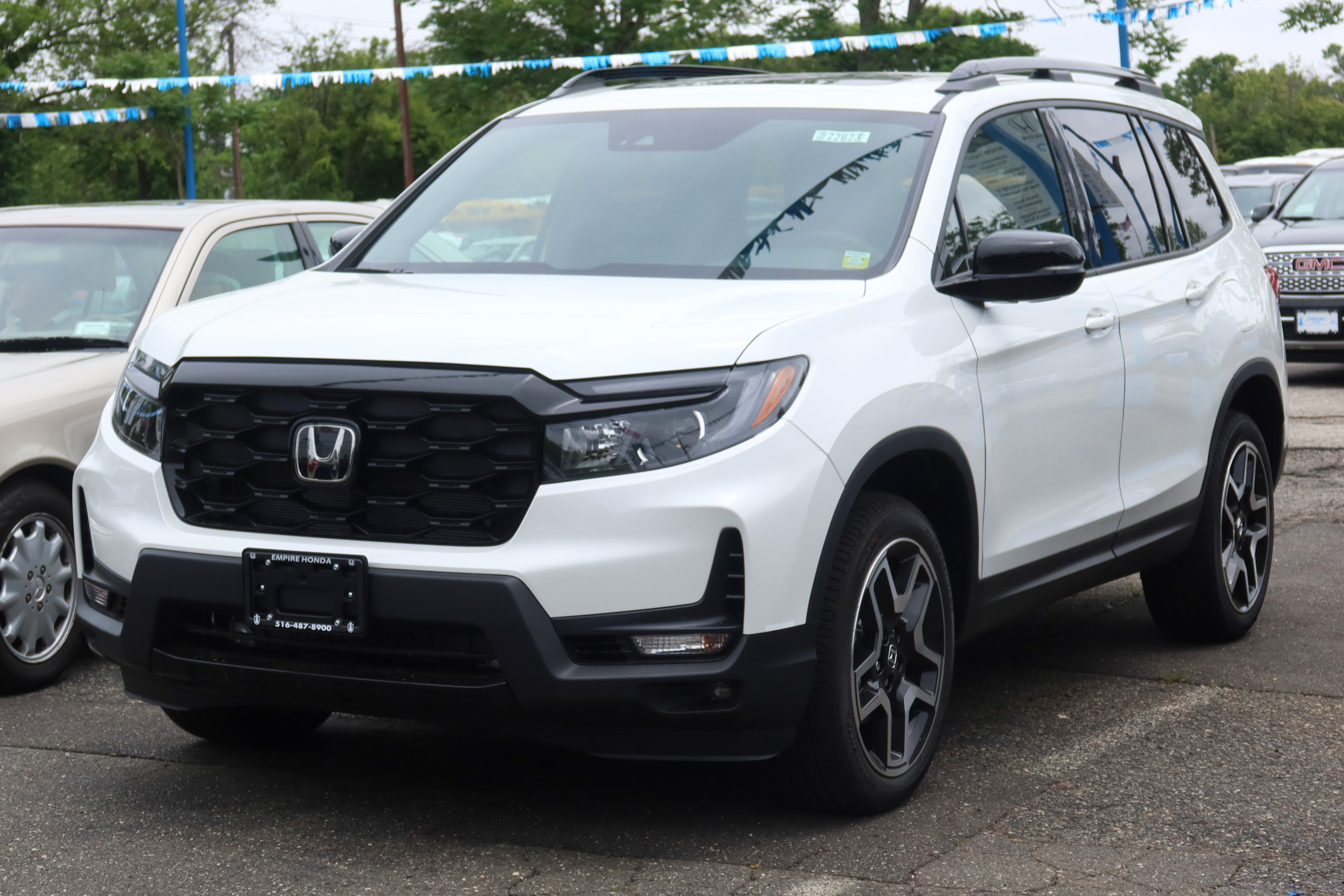
2022 Honda Passport Elite AWD (facelift)

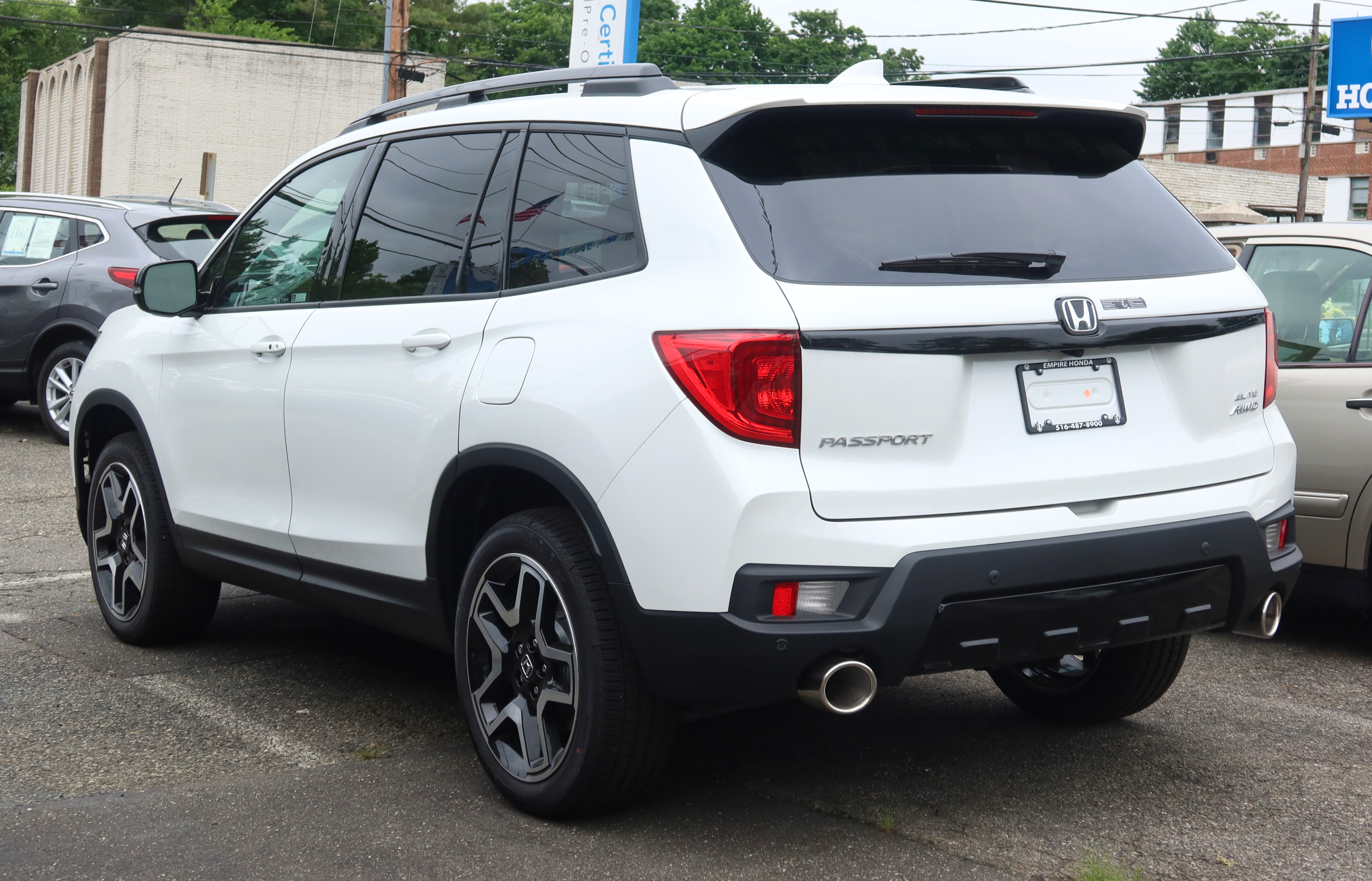
2022 Honda Passport Elite AWD (facelift)

=== Safety ===
The 2019 Passport received a "Top Safety Pick" award by the IIHS.

IIHS scores
Small overlap front (driver)	Good	
Small overlap front (passenger)	Acceptable	
Moderate overlap front	Good	
Side (original test)	Good	
Side (updated test)	Marginal	
Roof strength	Good	
Head restraints and seats	Good	
Headlights (varies by trim/option)	Acceptable	Poor
Front crash prevention: vehicle-to-vehicle	Advanced	
Child seat anchors (LATCH) ease of use	Acceptable	

== Fourth generation (YF9; 2026) ==
Fourth generation
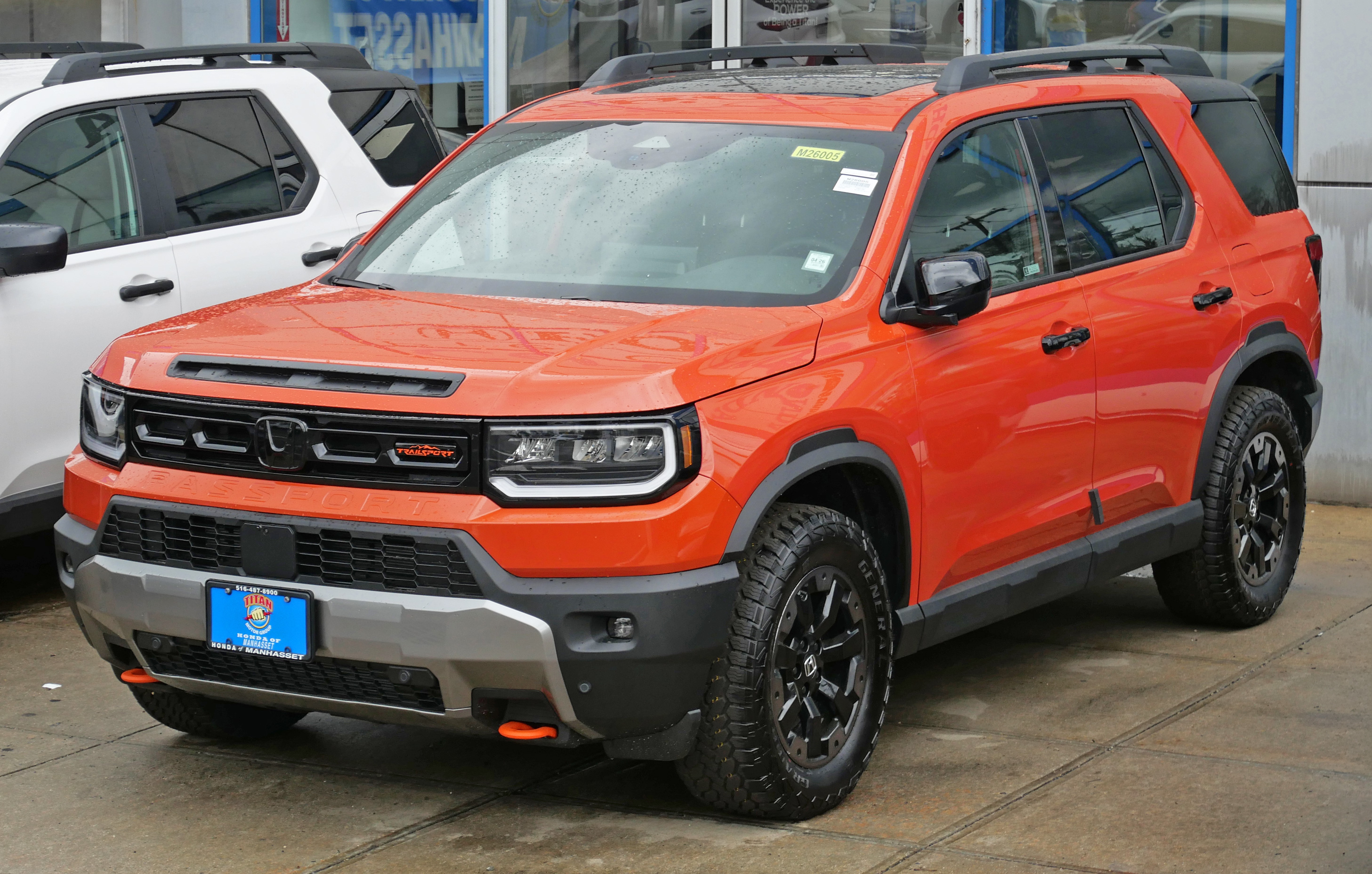
- 2026 Honda Passport TrailSport (US)

Overview
- Model code: YF9
- Production: March 2025–present
- Model years: 2026–present
- Assembly: United States: Lincoln, Alabama (HMA)

Body and chassis
- Platform: Global Light Truck Platform
- Chassis: Unibody
- Related: Honda Pilot

Powertrain
- Engine: 3.5 L J35Y8 V6
- Transmission: 10-speed automatic

Dimensions
- Wheelbase: 113.8 in (2,891 mm)
- Length: 190.6 in (4,841 mm)
- Width: 79.5 in (2,019 mm)
- Height: 73.1 in (1,857 mm)
- Curb weight: 2,031–2,134 kg (4,478–4,705 lb)

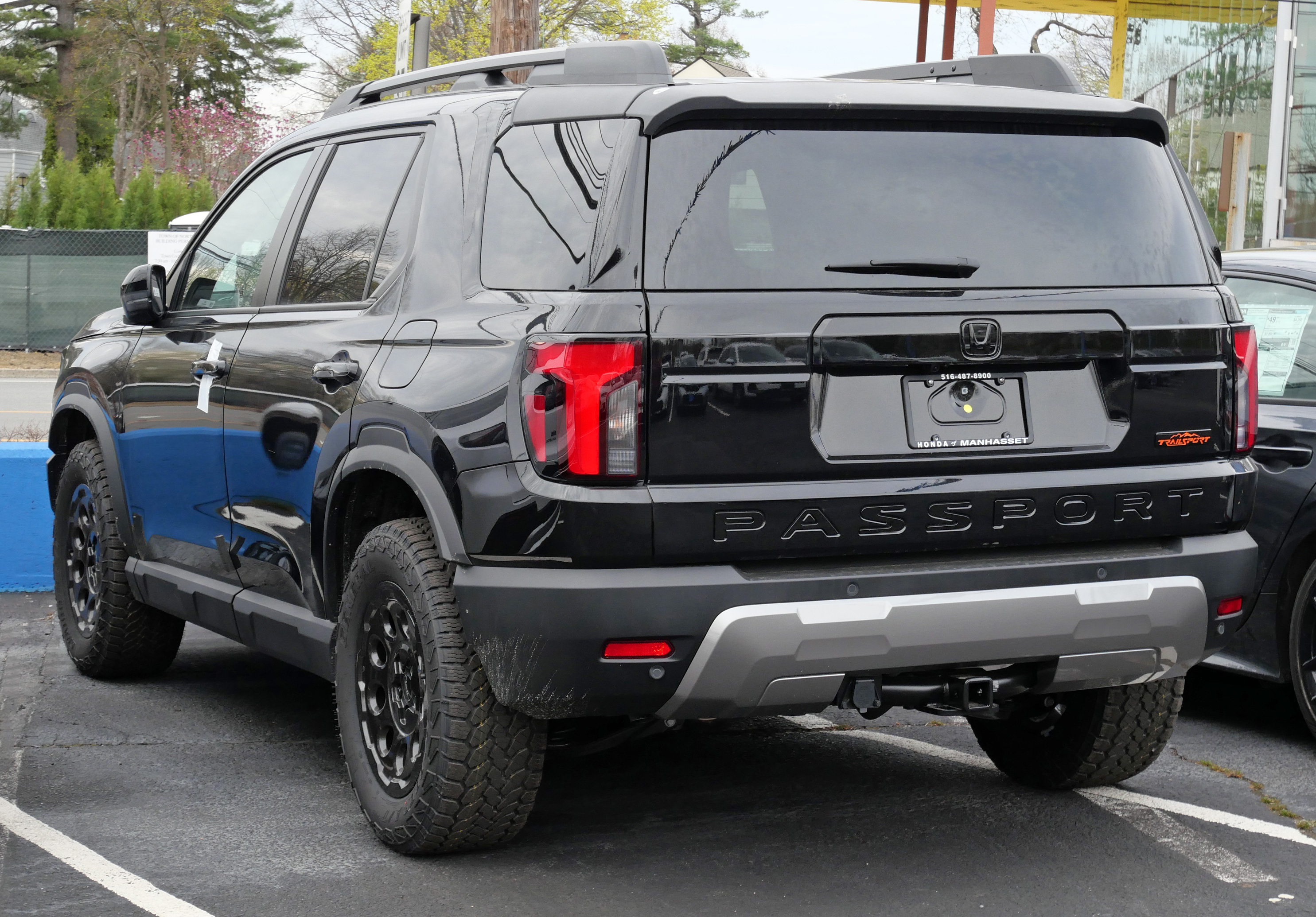
Rear view

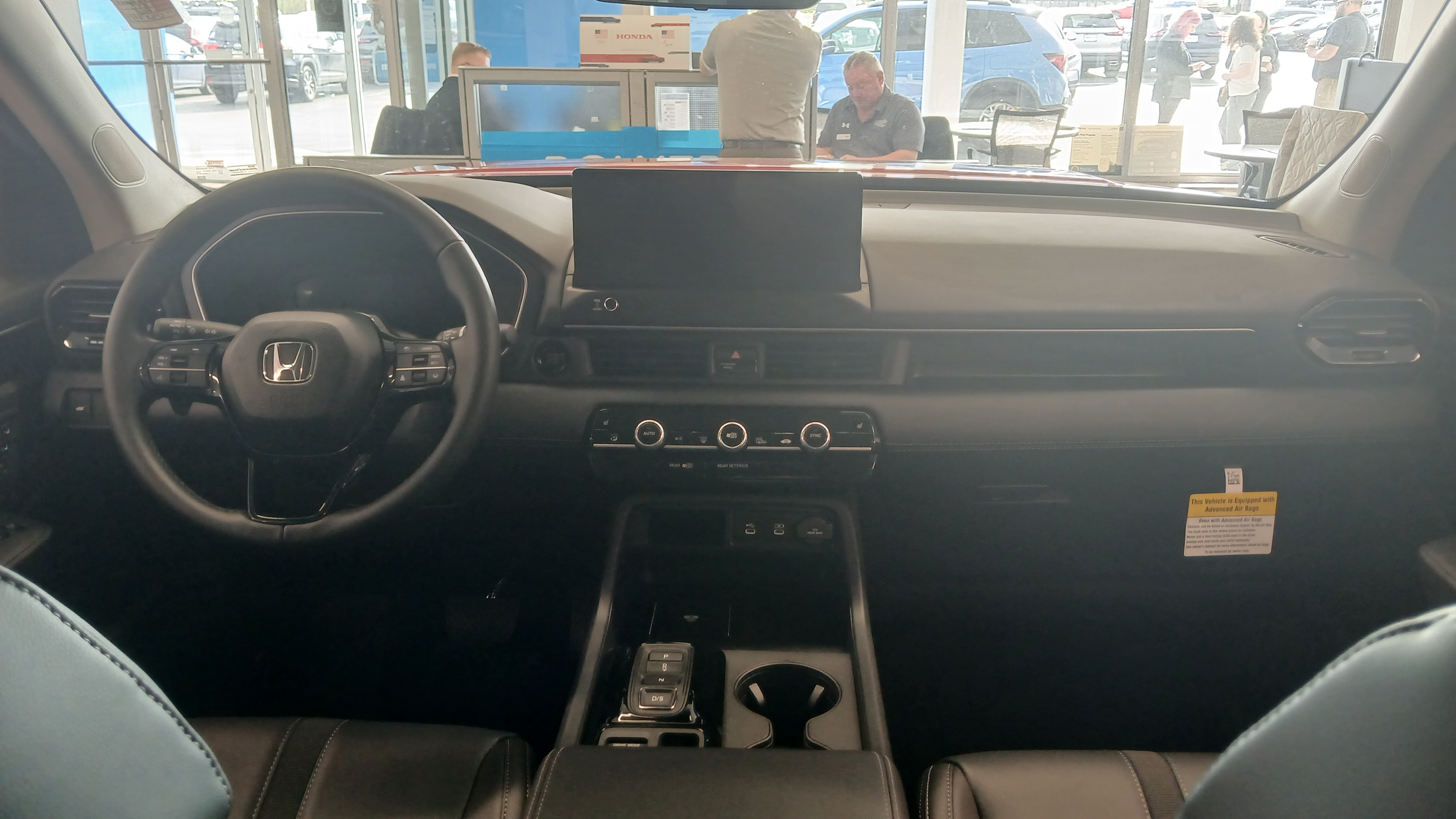
Interior

The fourth-generation Passport was unveiled on November 13, 2024. Honda released the Passport on February 11, 2025 for the 2026 model year. It is available in three trim levels: RTL, TrailSport and TrailSport Elite.

For the exterior, the design is based on the Born Wild concept with bold backpack design theme. It features LED DRL signature includes distinctive amber lighting for TrailSport models, an increased dash-to-axle ratio with a shorter front overhang, increased ground clearance with improved approach angle, and PASSPORT stamped on the front fascia and steel tailgate. The TrailSport model features all-terrain tires, orange heavy-duty recovery hooks, steel skid plates for underbody protection and a unique suspension tuned for off-road driving. The rear roof section features a unique matte black finish and the car's antenna integrated into the passenger side rear glass replacing shark-fin style roof antenna.

Inside, there is a 10.2-inch digital instrument cluster, a 12.3-inch touchscreen infotainment system which features Google built-in and wireless compatibility for Android Auto and Apple CarPlay, and an available 12-speaker Bose premium audio system. In its model history, the Passport has the largest cargo space of 44 cu ft (1,200 L) expands to 83.5 cu ft (2,360 L) when the rear seats folded down, it features a redesigned underfloor storage area and a cargo shelf which can transform into a picnic table could be ordered as an accessory.

For safety, the Honda Sensing comes standard with a number of advanced driving assistance features. The TrailSport models comes with a TrailWatch camera system, and readouts for Roll, Pitch and Elevation.

All models comes with a 3.5-liter V6 gasoline engine paired to a 10-speed automatic transmission and comes standard with the Honda torque vectoring i-VTM4 all-wheel drive system, which features a stronger rear drive unit. For the suspension, MacPherson struts used for the front and a multi-link suspension used for the rear.

This generation will be sold in Japan starting 2026, which is imported from the United States with unchanged left-hand drive configuration.

== Sales ==
Calendar year	US	Canada
1993	106	
1994	25,758	
1995	27,981	
1996	28,184	
1997	22,622	
1998	26,094	
1999	22,974	
2000	21,892	
2001	17,448	
2002	3,525	
2003	70	
2019	36,085	2,678
2020	39,567	2,734
2021	53,133	2,869
2022	41,306	2,923
2023	40,789	2,783
2024	32,527	
2025	55,231	
