= Honda CR250R =

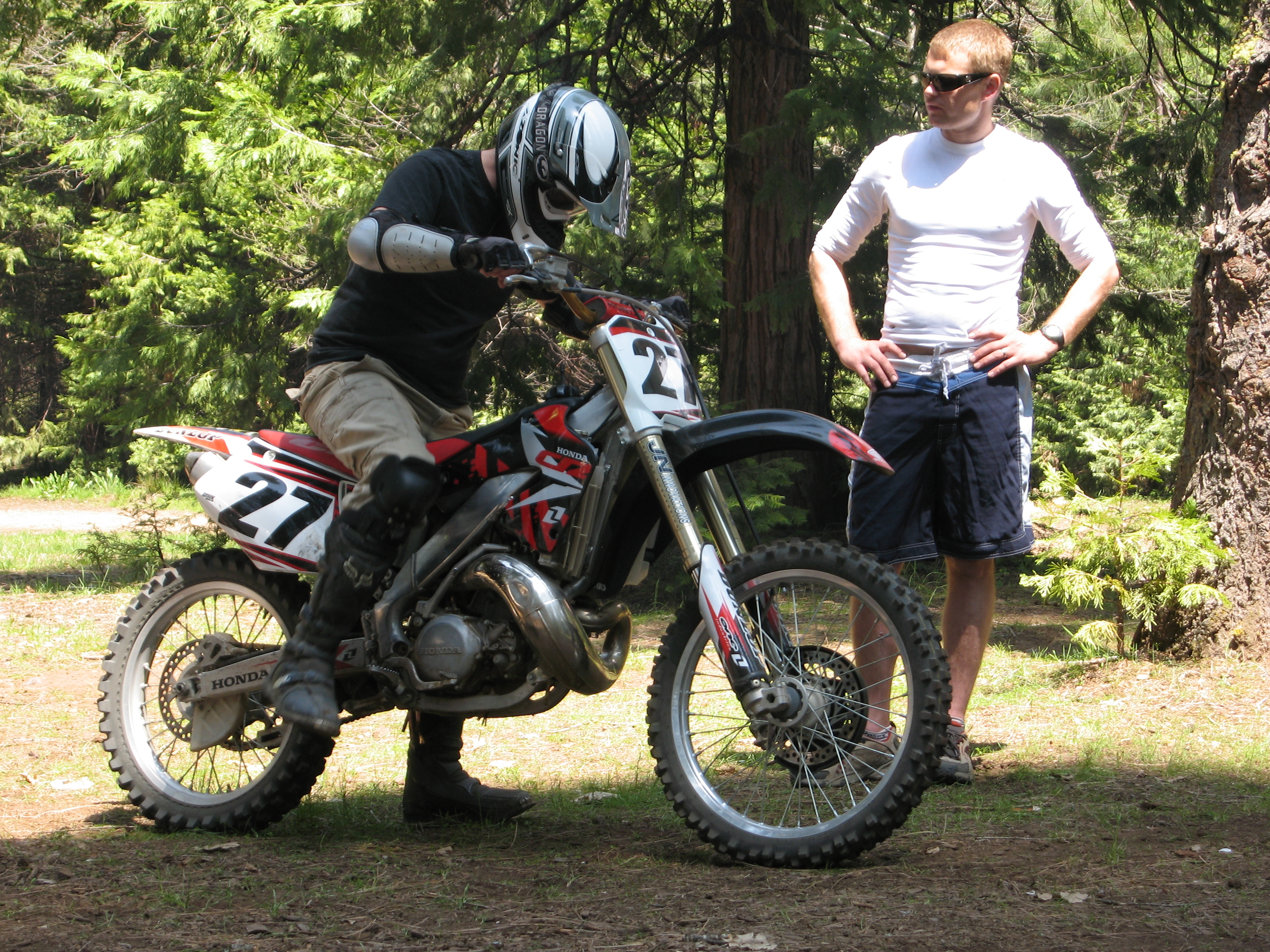
- Manufacturer: Honda
- Production: 1973–2007
- Predecessor: Honda CR250M
- Class: Motocross
- Engine: 249 cc (15.2 cu in) liquid cooled two-stroke single
- Bore / stroke: 66.4mm x 72.00mm
- Top speed: 75 mph (121 km/h)
- Power: 43kW
- Ignition type: CDI
- Transmission: 5-speed constant mesh, chain drive, manual
- Frame type: Twin tube aluminum
- Suspension: Front: Showa, adjustable compression and rebound Rear: Showa, adjustable low speed and high speed compression and low speed and high speed rebound
- Brakes: 240 mm (9.4 in) single disc, front and rear
- Tires: Front: 80/100-21; Rear: 110/90-19
- Rake, trail: 26.5°, 110 mm (4.3 in)
- Wheelbase: 1,481 mm (58.3 in)
- Seat height: 942 mm (37.1 in)
- Weight: 96.6 kg (213 lb) (dry)
- Fuel capacity: 7.57 L (2.00 US gal)
- Oil capacity: 650ml or 650cc
- Fuel consumption: average of 25 mpg
- Related: Honda CR series

The Honda CR250R was a Honda racing dirt bike. The prototype was built in 1971, but it was not until late 1972 that production of the 1973 model "out of the box racers" began sale to the general public. The CR250 was produced for 35 years, 2007 being the final year of production.

== History ==
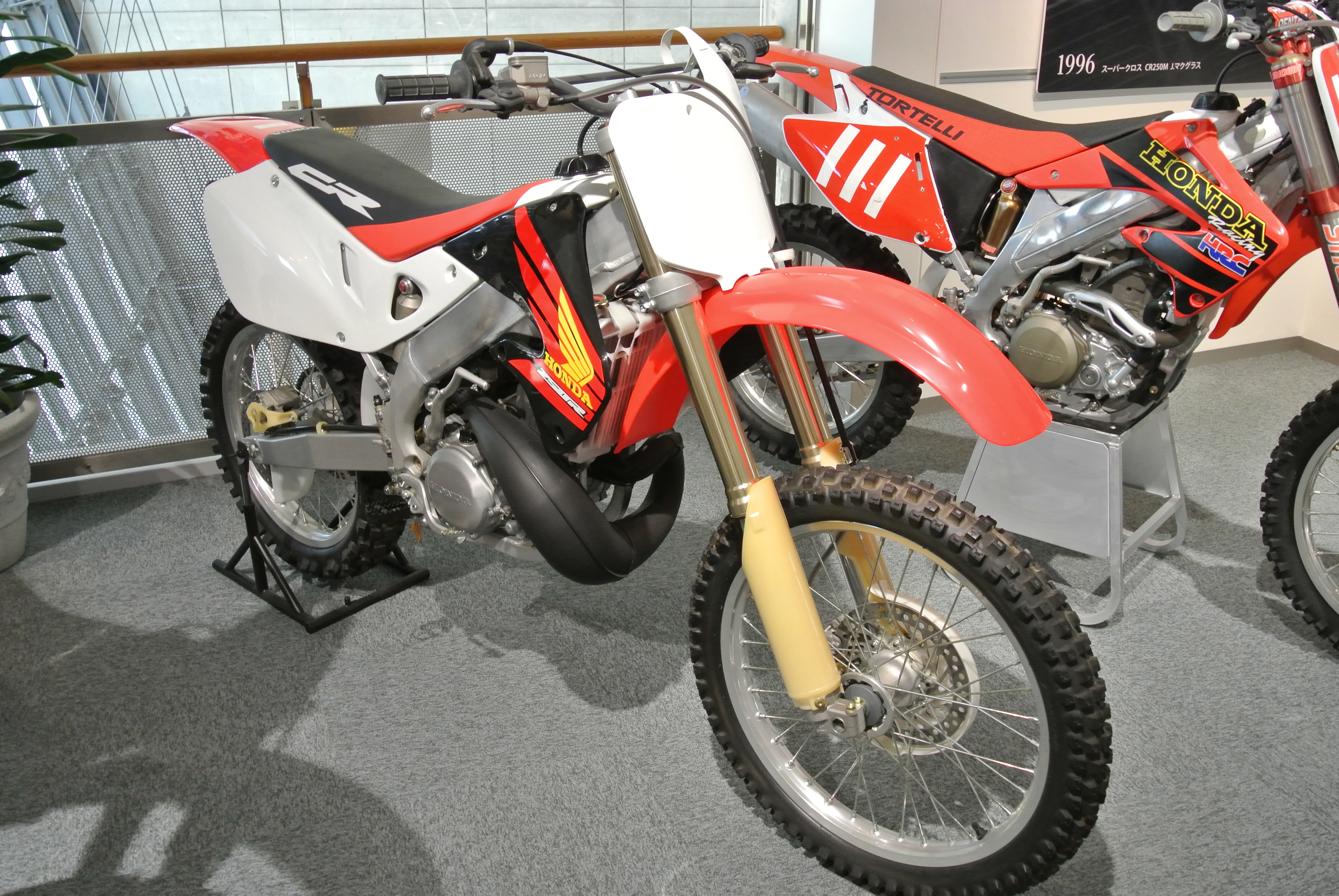
1997 Honda CR250R in the Honda Collection Hall

In 1997, Honda produced an industry first, an aluminum chassis for a motocross motorcycle. These 'first gen' frames were thick, rigid, and were a big change from the previous steel frames, where flexibility had been seen as a problem in the early years. The 1997-8 engines were equipped with a new stator, which supplied DC voltage for the new Keihin carburetor with an electronic 'Power Jet' system, in efforts to control lean mixture preignition. Included in the new electrics was a capacitor and a rectifier/regulator. The 1999 model was almost identical but the Power Jet had disappeared.

For 2000, the 'second gen' aluminum frame was less rigid, with thinner twin-spars, providing a rigidity decrease and better handling. The Keihin PWK carburetor replaced earlier PJ models. The CDI box limited RPMs to 8000. The 2001 model was similar, with a change to a different CDI box, adding 500 RPM to the redline where two more horsepower lurked. The porting and exhaust pipe were also changed for 2001. The new Mikuni TMX carburetor proved to be difficult to jet.

For 2002, Honda ended the outstanding interchangeability that had existed from 1992~2001, when a completely new engine arrived with a change from cylinder reed induction to an engine case reed induction system and an electronically controlled, cable operated RC valve in place of the centrifugally operated exhaust valve system used since 1992. A TPS (Throttle Position Sensor) was added to the carburetor, powered by a new stator. The ECM would now be able to retard ignition timing to preclude preignition, though there was no ping sensor anywhere.

The third & final generation of the CR250 aluminum chassis also made its appearance, which was thinner, with better flex properties. The same engine & chassis, with minor suspension & plastics changes, continued on until production of this 2-stroke stopped in 2007. Although the case reed engine has potentially the best design, it was never developed to its full potential by Honda, as the industry attention rapidly turned to four stroke engine development. Many owners of the final generation of the CR250 felt the need to turn to the aftermarket to bring that engine to its full potential. The 2001 models continue to be savored by lovers of the CR250, considered the best of the best ever produced.
