= Helsingor (disambiguation) =

Helsingor or variation may refer to:

== Places ==
- Helsingør, Helsingør Municipality, Denmark; a.k.a. "Elsinore"; a city
- Helsingør Municipality, Denmark; a.k.a. "Elsinore Municipality"; an administrative region containing the city of Helsingor
- Diocese of Helsingør, Denmark; of the Evangelical Lutheran Church of Denmark.

== Facilities ==
- Helsingør Station, Helsingør, Helsingør Municipality, Denmark; a rail station
- Helsingør Stadium, Helsingør, Helsingør Municipality, Denmark; a soccer stadium
- Helsingør Cemetery, Helsingør, Helsingør Municipality, Denmark;
- Helsingør City Museum
- Helsingør Maritime Museum

== Other uses ==
- Convention of Helsingör, a 17th-century treaty between the Dutch Republic and Swedish Empire
- FC Helsingør, a soccer team in Elsinore

== See also ==
- Elsinore (disambiguation)
