= Honda CR series =

Range of off-road motorcycles

Honda CR
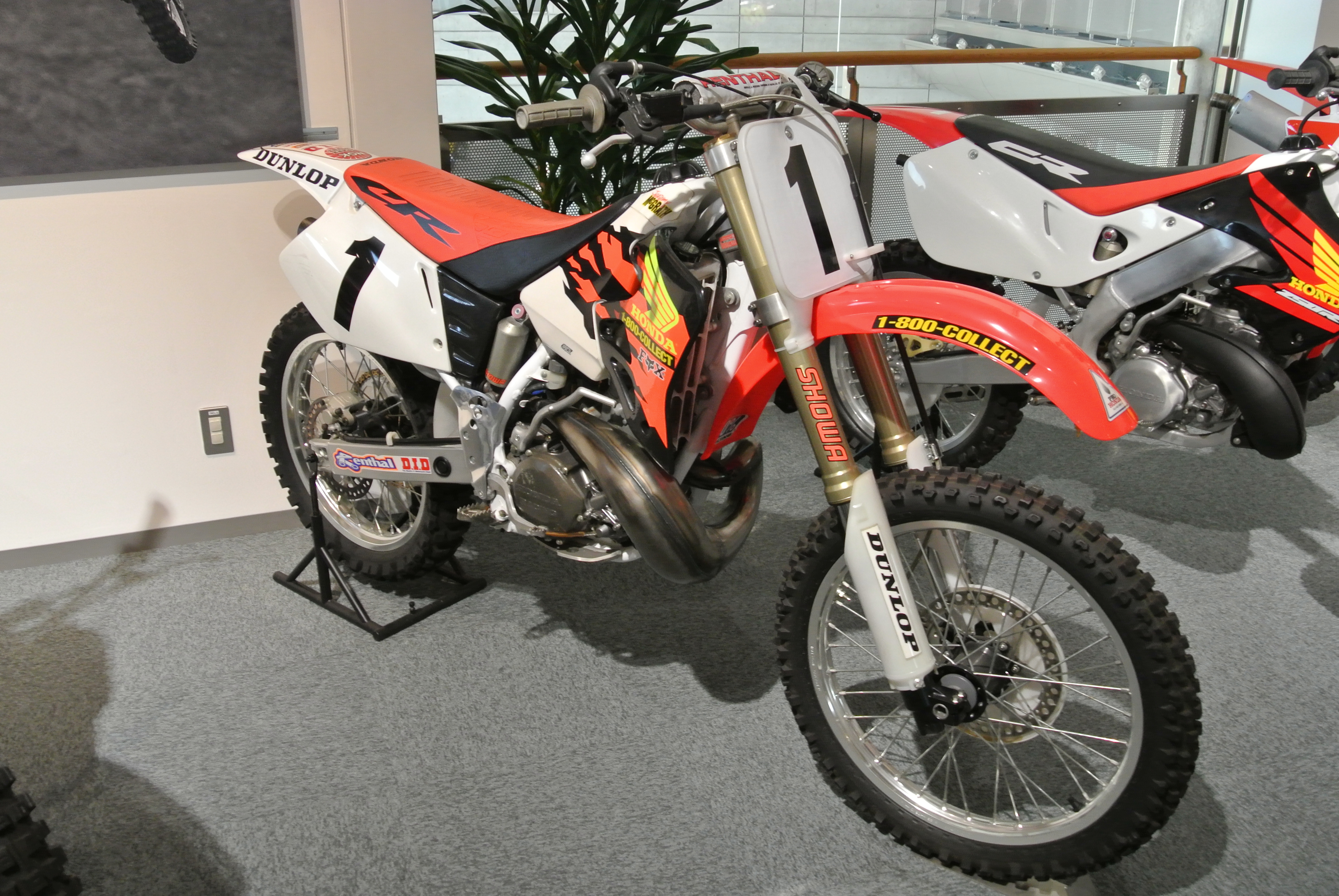
- 1996 Honda CR250R
- Manufacturer: Honda
- Production: 1973–2007
- Successor: Honda CRF series
- Class: Motocross, Dual-sport

The Honda CR series was a line of two-stroke off-road motorcycles made by Honda from 1973 to 2007. Considered one of the best motocross motorcycles of all time, they are racing motorcycles with countless trophies in the 125, 250 and 500 motocross classes. Marty Smith, Jeremy McGrath, Ricky Carmichael and many other motocross legends dominated racing circuits on Honda CR's. CR's continue competing today and are prized by racing enthusiasts and collectors alike.

The first generation Honda CR series (Elsinore) were named after the annual motorcycle race hosted in the early 1970s by Lake Elsinore, CA. This popular race was known as the Elsinore Grand Prix. It ran through the dusty Lake Elsinore farming town and surrounding hills from 1968 to 1972. The race was featured in the classic 1971 sports documentary "On Any Sunday," starring Steve McQueen, Malcolm Smith and Mert Lawwill.

== CR60R ==
The CR60R was produced in 1983 and 1984, and very few 1985 models. The CR60R had an air-cooled two-stroke engine, and featured the Honda ProLink rear suspension system. Even more rare is the CR50R, identical to the 60R, made from 1983-1985

== CR80R/85R ==
The CR80R was manufactured between 1980 and 2002 by Honda. It was changed in 2003 to the Honda CR85R and went until the 2007 model year, then was subsequently replaced by the Honda CRF150R, which was released in 2007 to the current model year. Several changes were made throughout the years from being air-cooled to water-cooled and different styling each year. The CR80R Expert started production in 1996. The machine was powered by a 2-stroke engine and utilised a 6-speed manual transmission.

== CR125 ==
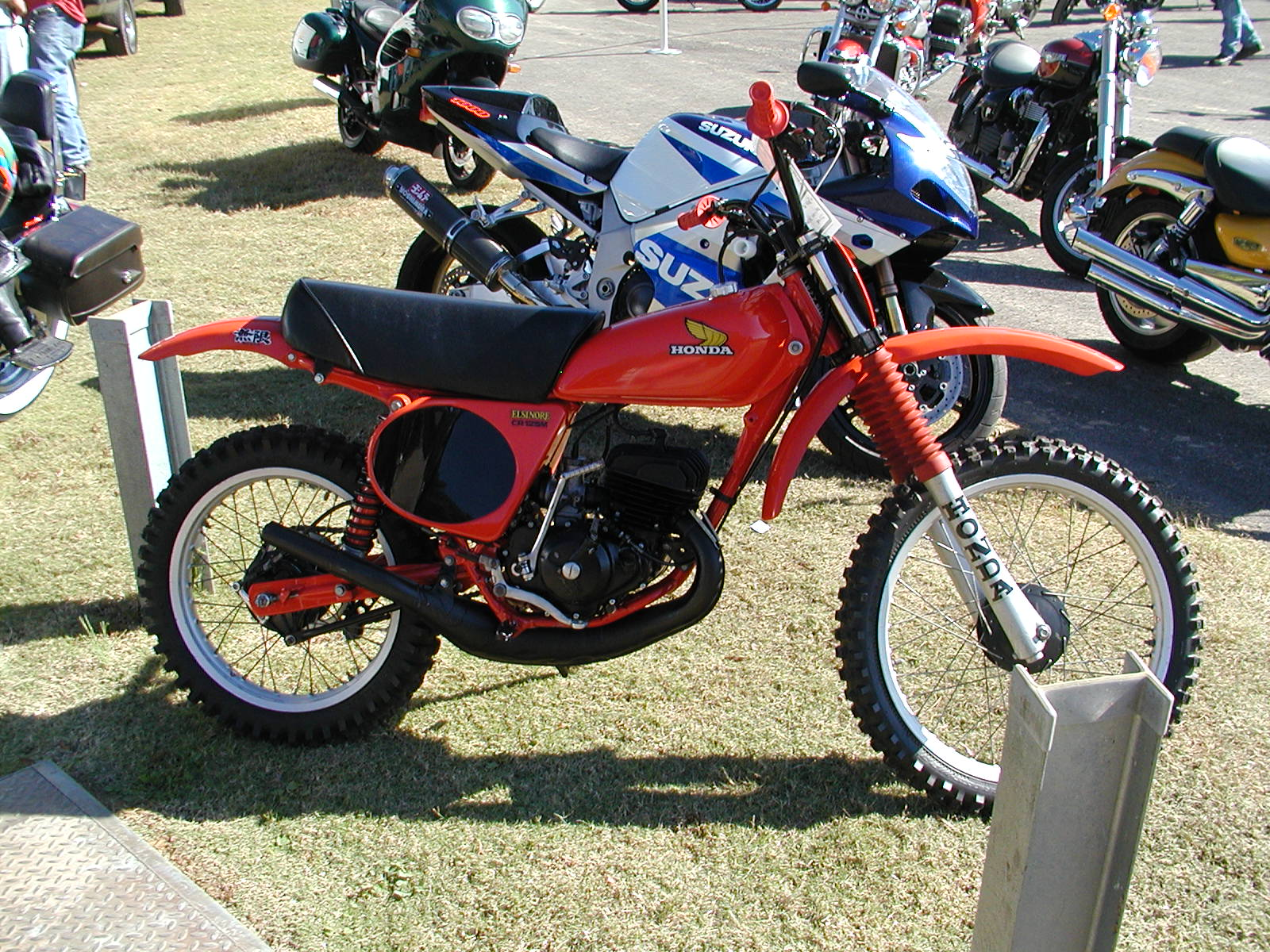
Honda CR125M Elsinore

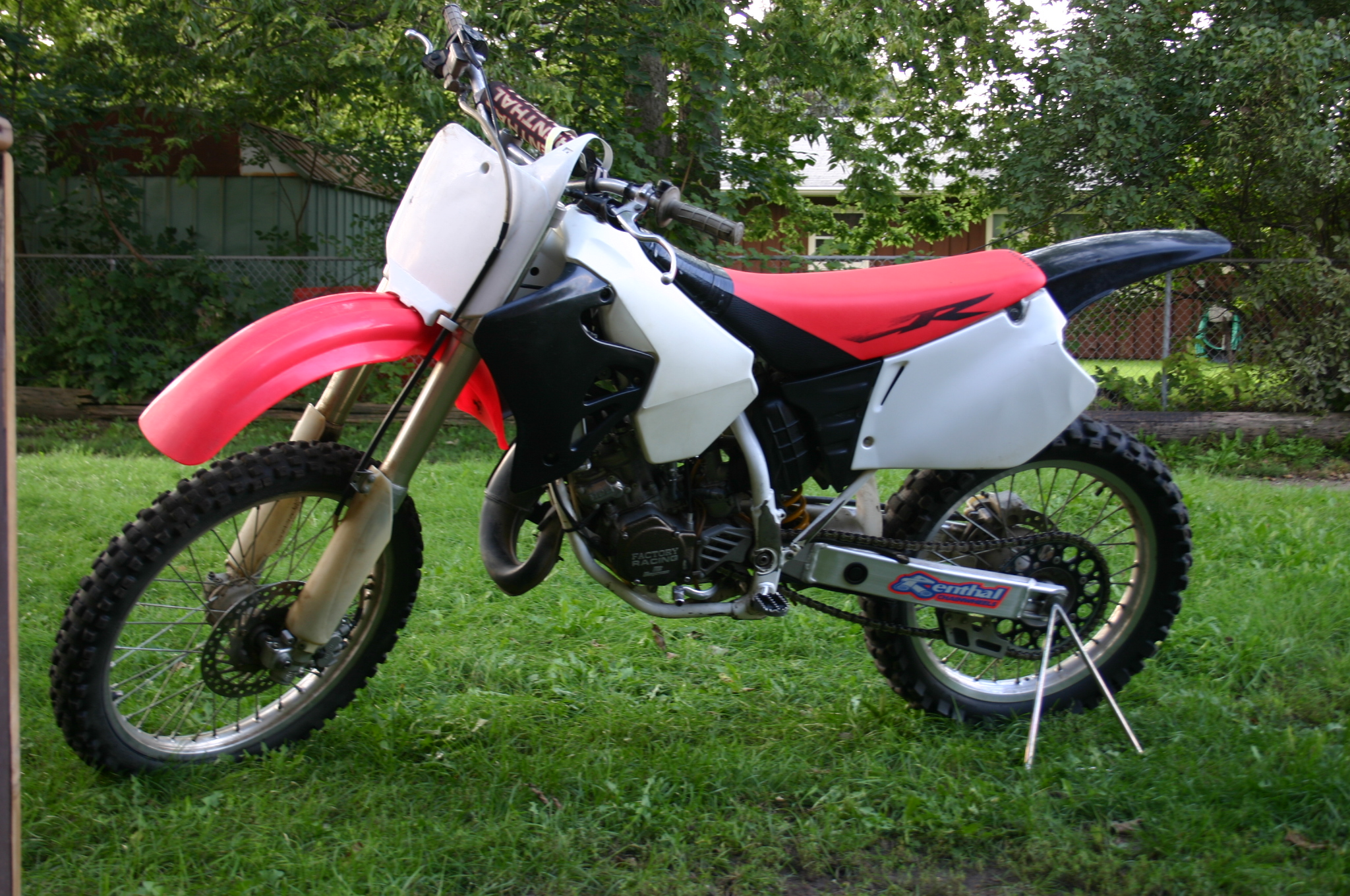
1997 Honda CR125R

Honda launched the CR125M in 1973, branded as the "20 Horsepower Feather". Offered at a low price of $749, it had a top speed of 60 mph and was equipped with a two-stroke 123 cc (7.5 cu in) air cooled motor. It was a very popular motorcycle, and it dominated motocross for a while.

In, 1978 Honda launched the CR125 Red Rocket Elsinore; a well built bike equipped with a 6-speed transmission, it can be recognized by the expansion chamber on the front of the cylinder where the exhaust is to be attached.

=== CRM 125 ===
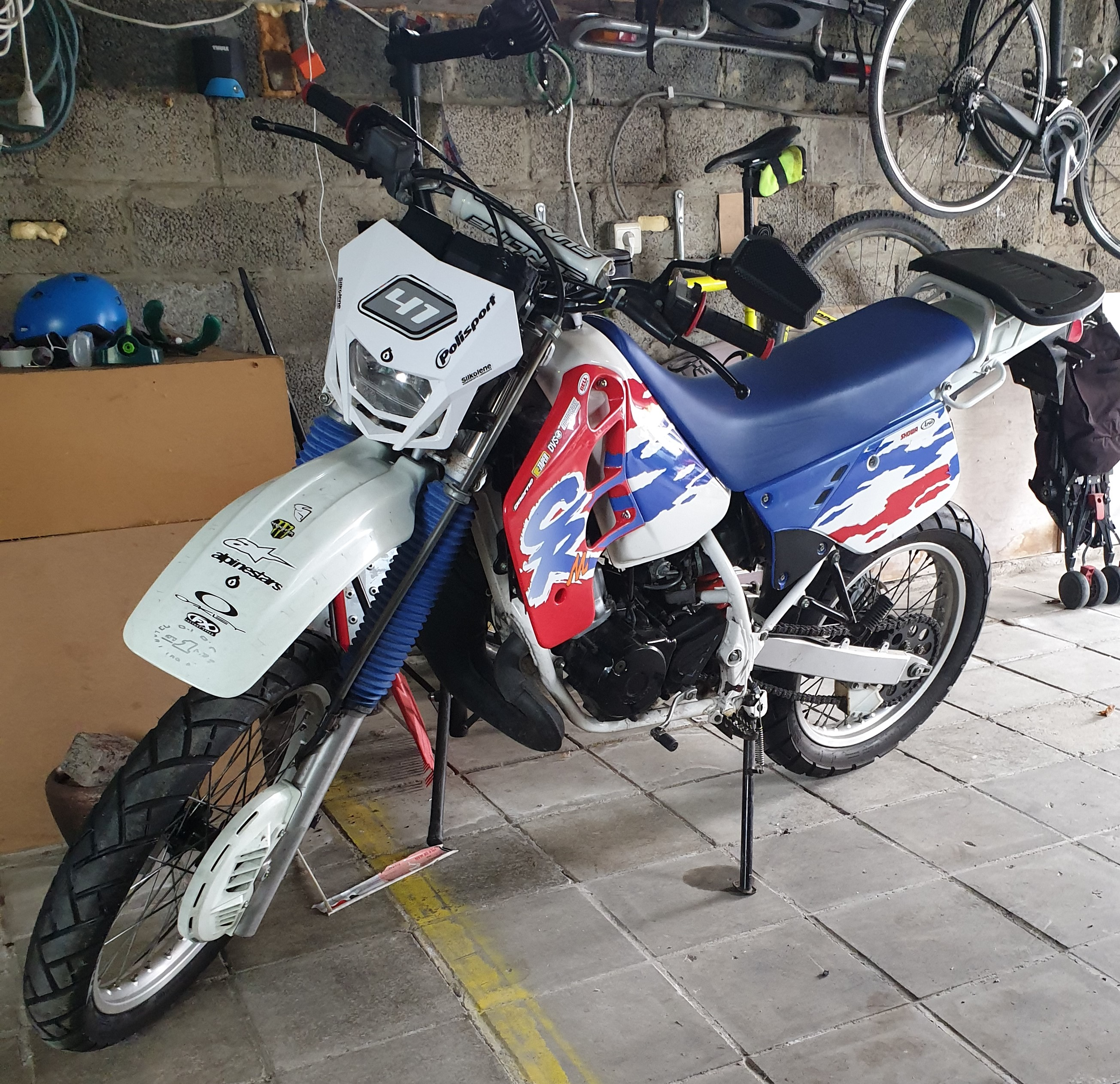
Honda CRM 125

The Honda HM CRM 125 is a dual-sport motorcycle produced from 1991 until 2017 through a collaboration between Honda and Montesa.

The CRM 125 is powered by a 124.8 cc liquid-cooled, single-cylinder, two-stroke engine.

== CR250 ==
=== CR250M ===
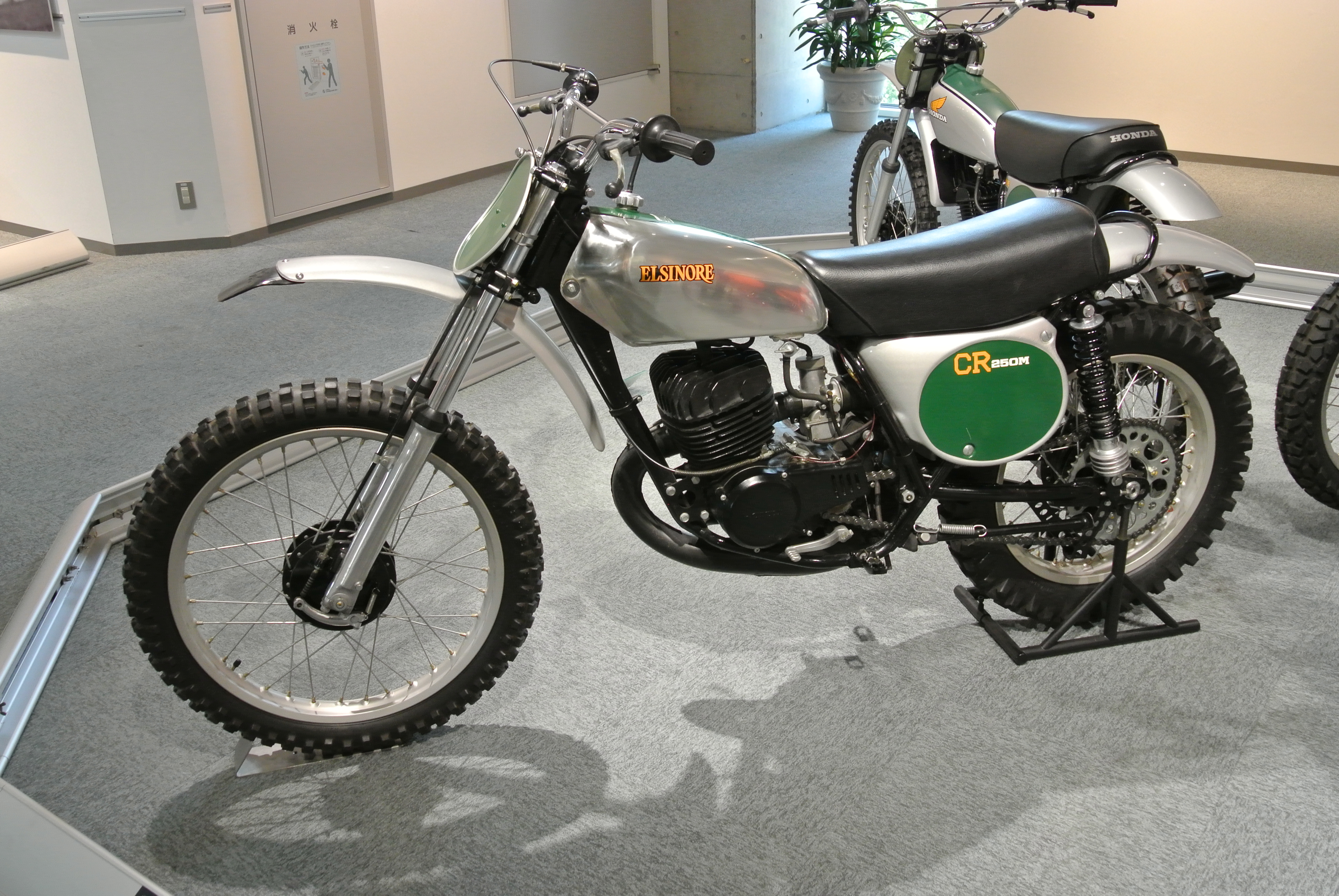
Honda CR250M Elsinore

The CR250M Elsinore began selling in 1973. It had a two-stroke engine and was one of the first of its class, and set the standard for two-stroke motorcycle development. In 1974 and 1975, the CR250M design changed little.

=== CR250R ===
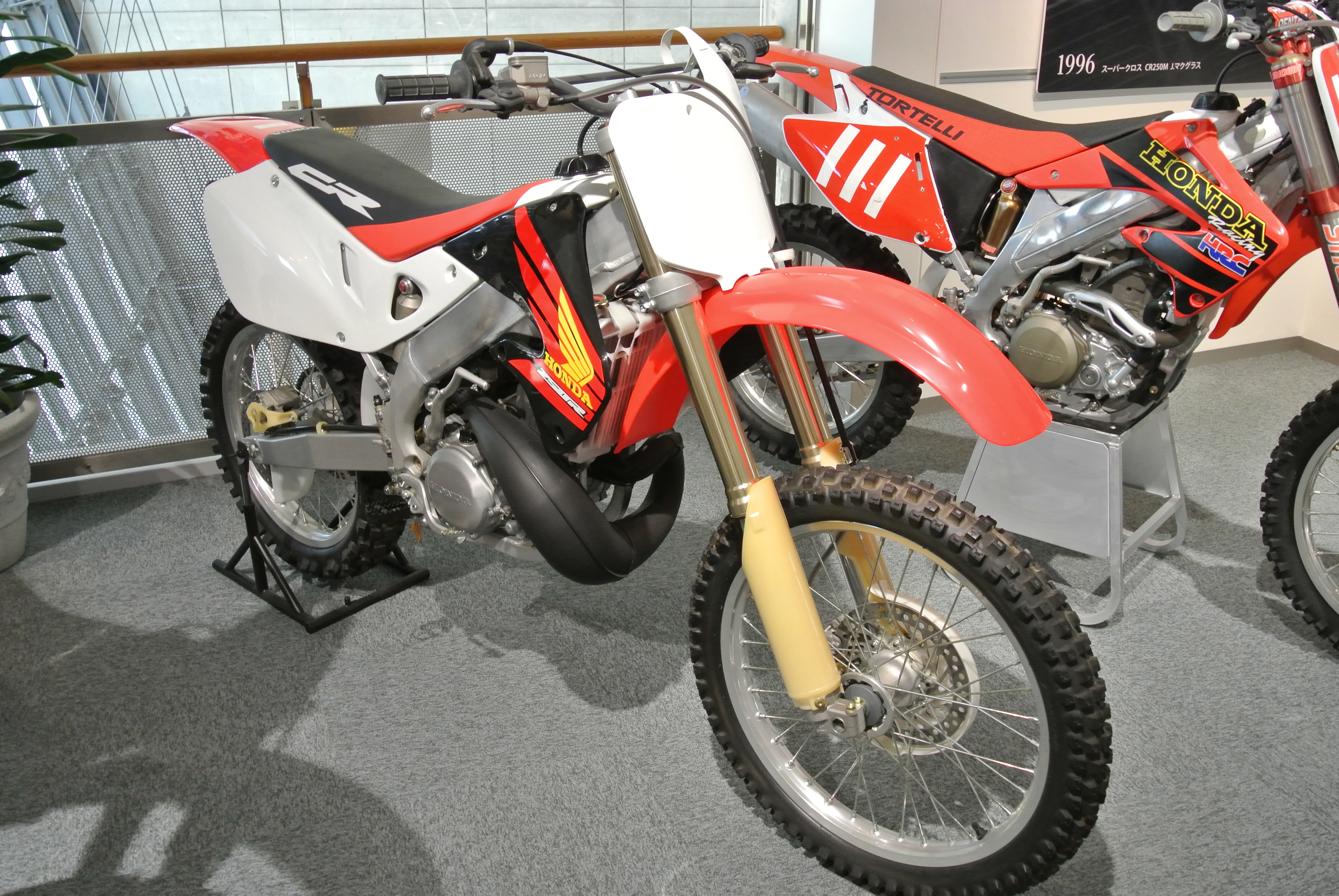
A 1997 Honda CR250R in the Honda Collection Hall

In 1978, Honda revised the CR250M and renamed it the CR250R, the 'R' stands for 'Replica'. Considered one of the best motocross motorcycles of all time. In 1981, Honda introduced a new suspension. The 1984 model had a new hydraulic front disc brake, and a new exhaust valve. Between then and 1990 the CR250R had minor changes such as hydraulic rear brake, Showa front suspension, and a bigger carburetor.

In 1992, the CR250R was given a newer, more aggressive design, but a disadvantage was the amount of power the new engines were producing in relation to the weak steel frame. Many riders advised Honda to change the frame to something stronger. In 1997, the aluminum frame was introduced. Many racers liked this frame but the bike was not selling to casual desert riders, so Honda undertook a redesign and in 2000 introduced an improved aluminum frame. In 2002, the only real change was the bike was made faster and lighter and the electronic power valve and third-generation aluminum frame. It had a five-speed transmission with Showa suspension and a two-gallon fuel tank. The 2001 CR250R is considered the pinnacle of 250cc Honda two-stroke engineering. In 2007, Honda announced that they would cease production of two-strokes after that year.

=== CRM 250 ===
The CRM 250 was a 2 stroke trail bike made from 1989 to 1999.

- CRM250 Mk1 1989–1990
- CRM250 Mk2 & 2.2 1991–1993
- CRM250 Mk3 1994–1996
- CRM250 AR 1996–1999
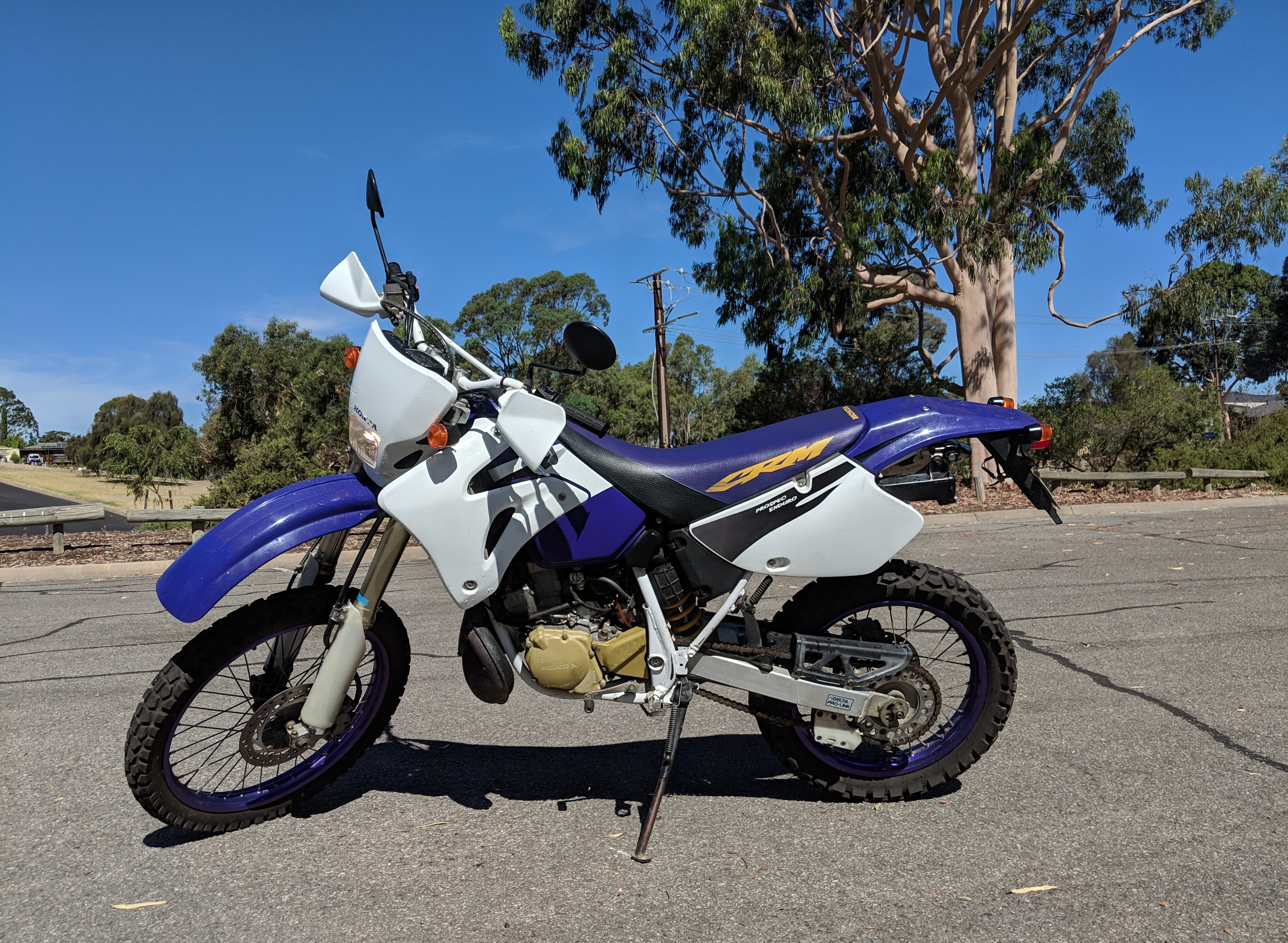
1999 Honda CRM 250 AR

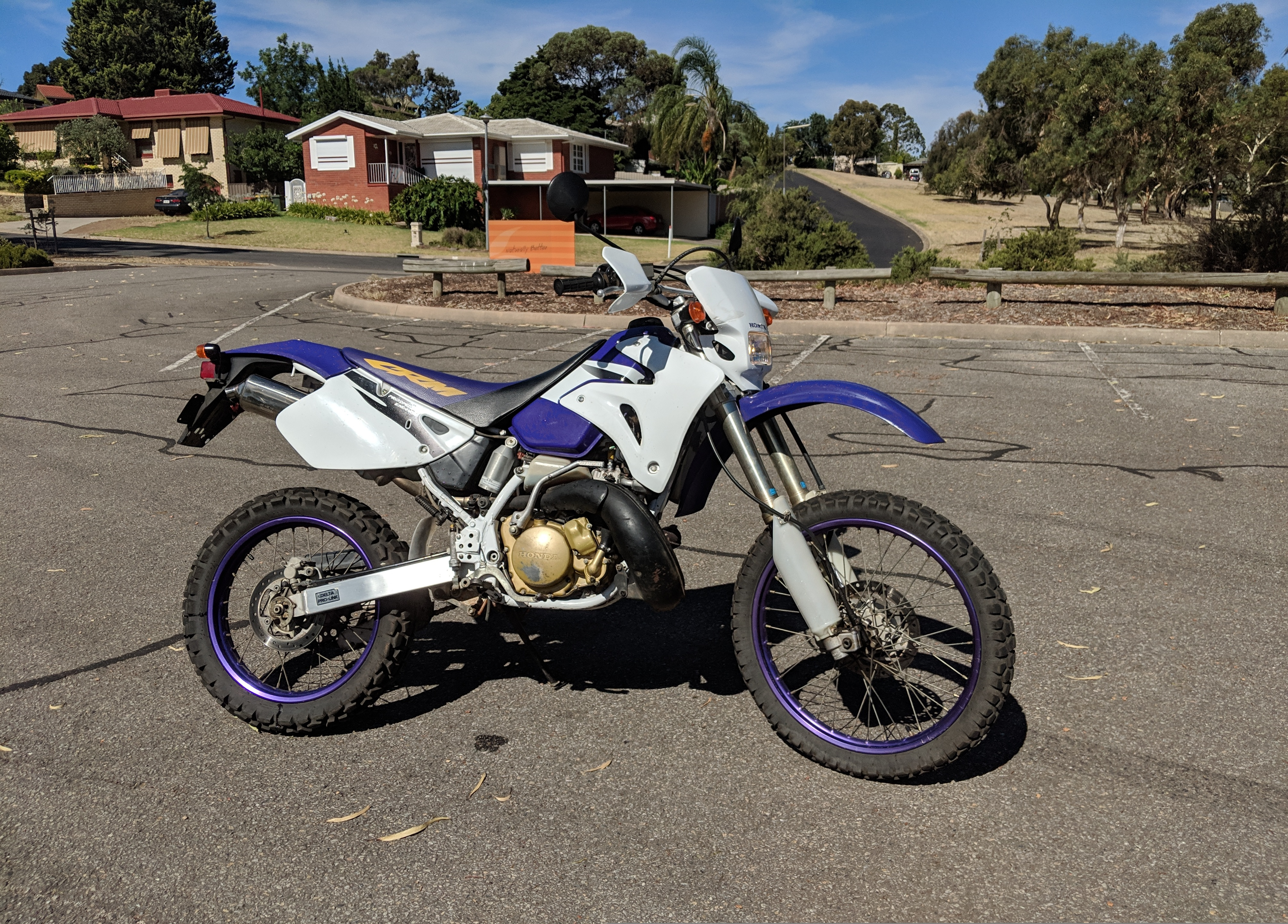
1999 Honda CRM 250 AR

== CR500 ==
=== CR450R ===
The CR450R was produced in 1981. The CR450R had an air-cooled two-stroke engine with a 4-speed transmission, and featured the ProLink rear suspension system.

=== CR480R ===
The CR480R was made in 1982 and 1983. The bike was a replacement for the earlier Honda CR450, made only in 1981. The '82 had a front drum brake and a four-speed gearbox. The '83 had internally adjustable front forks and a five-speed gearbox.

=== CR500 ===
The CR500 was first produced in 1984, and had a 491 cc (30.0 cu in) air-cooled two-stroke engine that produced 60.8 hp, the most powerful motocross bike that Honda had ever produced. For 1985, a new water-cooled engine was introduced. The CR500 raced in long desert rallies like the Baja 500 and 1000. The 500 cc racing class was discontinued by the AMA in 1993. In the US, the last year Honda sold the CR500 was 2001 and 2002 in Australia. Due to the lack of product development, the last Honda CR 500's sold were nearly identical to the 1993 model.
