= Honda Pilot (ATV) =

All-terrain vehicle produced by Honda

The Honda Pilot is an all-terrain vehicle produced by the Honda Motor Company in 1989 and 1990. This vehicle is also known as the FL400R, the model number assigned to this vehicle by Honda.

Its body style was based on the earlier Honda Odyssey model and was the last ATV manufactured in this style. The Honda Pilot features a full roll cage and four-point safety harness.

Item	Specifications
Overall length	2195 mm (86.4 in)
Overall width	1510 mm (59.4 in)
Overall height	1450 mm (57.0 in)
Wheelbase	1580 mm (62.2 in)
Tread Front	1120 mm (44.1 in) Used and raced in race classes today
Tread Rear	1235 mm (48.6 in)
Seat height	325 mm (12.8 in)
Ground clearance	235 mm (9.3 in)
Dry weight	269 kg (593 Ib)
Weight distribution Front	88 kg (194 Ib)
Weight distribution Rear	181 kg (399 Ib)
