= Honda Odyssey (ATV) =

Line of all-terrain vehicles

Honda Odyssey was a line of single-seat four-wheel all-terrain vehicles produced by the Honda Motor Company between 1977 and 1989.

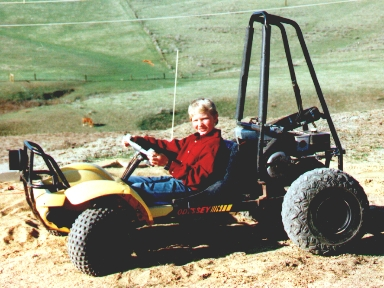
1979 Honda Odyssey FL250. Note the original engine has been replaced with a Polaris 440 cc snowmobile engine. The original engine is a 250cc single cylinder air-cooled two stroke engine.

== First generation FL250 (1977 - 1980) ==
The first generation Honda Odyssey can be identified by the yellow body with the black roll bar and no front bumper. Lack of suspension in the rear caused problems with stress cracks in the frame and handling in rough terrain. Heating issues were also an issue with this model. In 1980 the head light was moved from the front rack to the top of the roll bar and the 6 volt system was changed to a 12 volt system. Options included a rear tote rack, chevron pattern tires, and trailer hitch.

== Second generation FL250 (1981 - 1984) ==
In 1981, the second generation Honda Odyssey was introduced. Although mechanically identical to the first generation, Honda changed the look of the Odyssey by changing the colors to Honda Red and adding a full cage roll-bar. Other improvements included improved shoulder harness padding, 60 watt rectangular headlight mounted high on the roll-bar, improved water resistance in the torque converter, larger capacity fuel filter, capacitor ignition(CDI), roll bar mounted air intake, and redesigned steering geometry allowing larger front shock absorbers and tighter turning radius.

Specifications (FL250)

- Length: 82.48 in (2,095 mm)
- Width: 48.43 in (1,230 mm)
- Height: 1977-1980 - 60.04 in (1,525 mm), 1981-1984 - 57.7 in (1,470 mm) to top of roll bar
- Wheelbase: 56.5 in (1,440 mm)
- Turning Radius: 1977-80 - 17.4 ft (5.3 m), 1981–84 - 14.1 ft (4.3 m)
- Ground clearance: 5.51 in (140 mm)
- Maximum Climbing Angle: 35 degrees
- Dry weight: 1977-1979 - 397 lb (180 kg), 1980 - 407 lb (185 kg), 1981-1984 - 430 lb (200 kg)
- Engine: Piston port two-stroke single
  - Bore: 70 mm (2.8 in), 78.5 mm (3.09 in)
  - Stroke: 64.4 mm (2.54 in)
  - Displacement: 248 cc (15.1 cu in)
  - Compression ratio: 6.6:1
  - Carburetor: 28 mm (1.10 in)-throat Keihin
- Starter: Recoil
- Ignition: 1977-1980 - Flywheel Magneto, 1981-1984 - Capacitor Discharge
- Idle Speed: 1500 rpm
- Spark Plug: NGK BR7ES
- Transmission: V-belt torque converter
- Wheels: Steel
  - Front: 8 by 5.5 in (200 by 140 mm)
  - Rear: 8 by 8.27 in (203 by 210 mm)
- Tires:
  - Front: 20x7x8
  - Rear: 22x11x8
- Brakes:
  - Rear self-adjusting cable actuated disk
  - Parking rear cable actuated shoe and drum
- Stopping Distance: 20 m (66 ft) from 50 km/h (31 mph) to 0
- Suspension:
  - Front Trailing arms with Hydraulic shock
  - Rear Solid axle
- Headlights: 1977-79 - 6V-35W, 1980 - 12V-45W, 1981-84 - 12V-60W
- Taillight: 1977-79 - none, 1980 - 12V-3W for Canadian Models Only, 1981-84 - 12V-3W

VIN Identification FL250

Honda used an independent VIN system of their own design for FL250 Odysseys and the following is their breakdown by year.

- 1977: FL250*1000001 – 1011921
- 1978: FL250*1100001 – 1112345
- 1979: FL250*2000001 – 2012620
- 1980: TB04*2000001 – 2006315
- 1981: TB040*BC400001 – BC406324
- 1982: TB040*CC500001 – CC514700
- 1983: TB040*DC600001 – DC617555
- 1984: TB040*EC700051 – EC703225

== FL350R (1985) ==
Scheduled to appear in spring 1984, the FL350R was delayed until early 1985. Honda upgraded the two-stroke engine to 342 cc (20.9 cu in) which was later decreased to 329 cc (20.1 cu in) in a recall. The engine was mounted behind the driver, and featured 6.7:1 compression, capacitor discharge ignition a 32 mm (1.26 in)-throat Keihin carburetor, and added electric starting. To improve stability, track was increased in 1985, to 42.5 in (1,080 mm) front and 47.2 in (1,200 mm) rear. Wheel travel is to 4.3 in (110 mm) front, 5.9 in (150 mm) rear. In addition, mechanical disc brakes were replaced with dual hydraulic drums in front and a single hydraulic rear disc. The transmission was a variable-pitch torque converter with one speed forward and one reverse. Fuel capacity was 3.1 US gallons (12 L) (with .7 US gal (2.6 L) reserve). The FL350 was replaced by the FL400 Pilot in 1989.

Specifications (FL350)

- Length: 85 in (2,200 mm)
- Width: 58.1 in (1,480 mm)
- Height: 54.7 in (1,390 mm) to top of roll cage
- Wheelbase: 60.6 in (1,540 mm)
- Ground clearance: 8.3 in (210 mm)
- Dry weight: 602 lb (273 kg)
- Engine:
  - Bore: 80 mm (3.1 in), 78.5 mm (3.09 in) after recall
  - Stroke: 68 mm (2.7 in)
  - Displacement: 342 cc (20.9 cu in), 329 cc (20.1 cu in) after recall
  - Compression ratio: 6.7:1, 6.0:1 after recall
  - Carburetor: 32 mm (1.26 in)-throat Keihin
- Fuel: Premix 20:1 with a minimum of 89 octane
- Transmission: torque converter, one speed forward, one reverse, plus neutral
- Wheels: steel
  - Front: 10 by 5.5 in (250 by 140 mm), 4 on 110 mm (4.3 in) bolt pattern
  - Rear: 10 by 8 in (250 by 200 mm), 4 on 130 mm (5.1 in) bolt pattern
- Tires: Ohtsu
  - Front: 21x7x10 RT101
  - Rear: 24x11x10 RT502
- Starter: Electric and recoil
- Ignition: Solid state CD
- Clutch: Automatic
- Transmission: V-belt torque converter with F/N/R gearbox
- Suspension:
  - Front: Dual-trailing arms w/hydraulic shocks, 4.3 inches of travel
  - Rear: Diagonal link-type w/gas charged shocks, 5.9 inches of travel
- Brakes:
  - Front: Dual hydraulic drums
  - Rear: Hydraulic disc
