= Visual Intercept =

- Original author(s): Elsinore Technologies Inc.
- Initial release: 1996; 29 years ago
- Final release: 3.7 / 2006; 19 years ago
- Operating system: Microsoft Windows
- Platform: C++, MFC
- Type: bug tracking / issue tracking

Visual Intercept is a Microsoft Windows based software defect tracking system produced by Elsinore Technologies Inc. Visual Intercept was actively sold from 1995 until early 2006 when it was integrated as a single solution in the broader IssueNet Intercept issue management system, also produced by Elsinore Technologies Inc.

== Version History ==
1.x

Intercept 1.0 was released in 1996. In 1998 the product line was expanded to include Intercept Relay for beta testers, Intercept SDK for integrations, and Intercept Web for Web Access. One of the distinguishing features of early versions of Intercept was its integration to Microsoft Visual SourceSafe.

2.x

Version 2.0 released in 2000 provided major and minor enhancements to all products in the Intercept product line. In addition to enhancements to existing capabilities Intercept 2.0 introduced integration to Visual Studio and VBA (Visual Basic for Applications) integration for implementing custom workflow rules. In the 2.0 time frame Elsinore Technologies also released Visual Intercept Project and integration to the products in the Microsoft Office suite. Visual Intercept Project was designed to help project managers dynamically update project plans by integrating them with the real time issue management data captured and tracked in Visual Intercept.

3.x

In 2002 Elsinore Technologies released Visual Intercept 3.0. The 3.0 release focused on updating the functionality of Visual Intercept Web and Web Relay to match the desktop suite and integrations to Visual Studio and Microsoft Office. After the initial release of version 3.0, Elsinore continued to release major enhancements to the 3.0 version in services releases as it completed its IssueNet platform which would serve as the software platform for version 4.0.

== See also ==
- IssueNet
