= Honda CR250M =

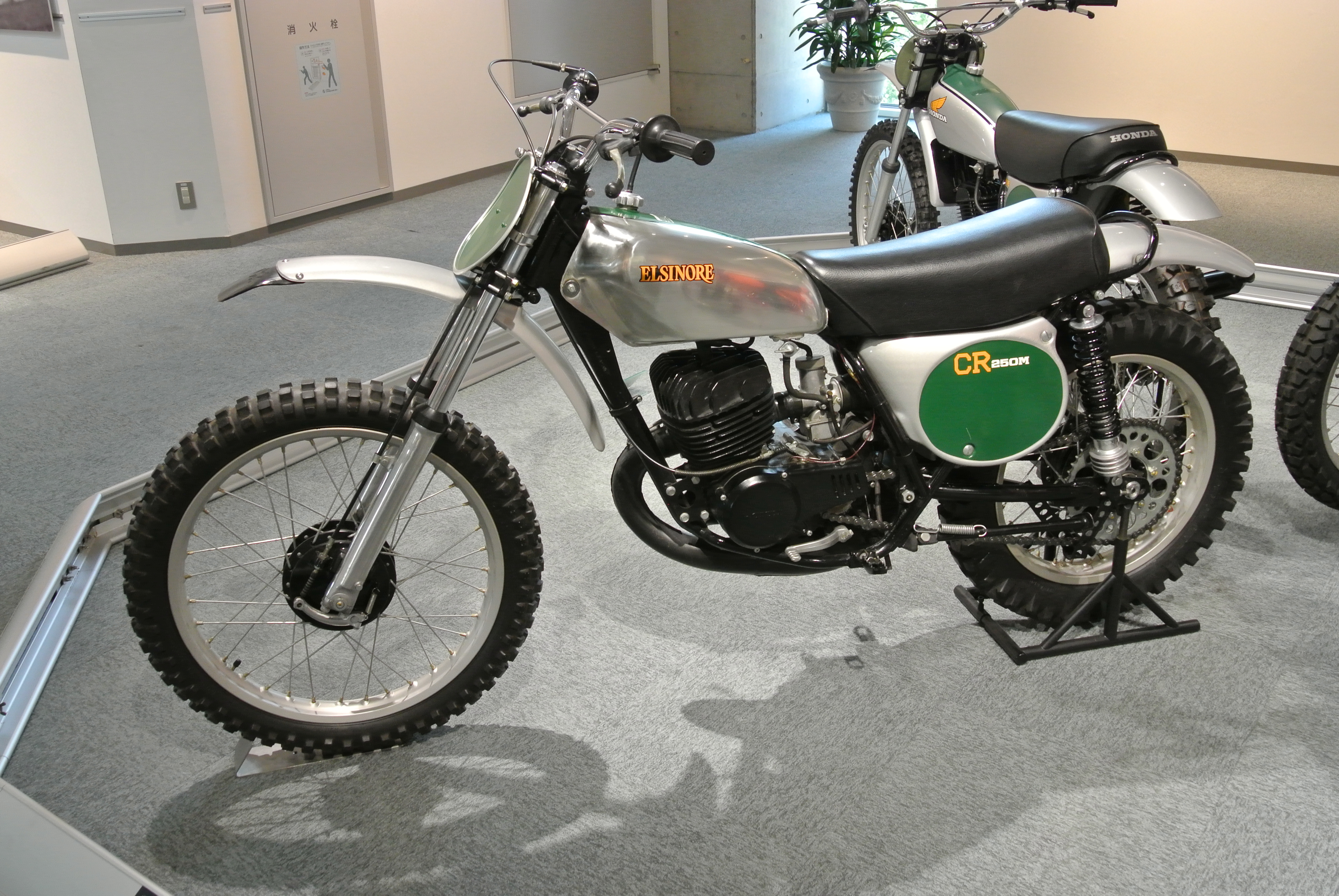
- Honda ELSINORE CR250M
- Manufacturer: Honda
- Also called: Elsinore
- Production: 1973–1976
- Successor: Honda CR250R
- Engine: 247.8cc single-cylinder
- Bore / stroke: 70x64.4 mm
- Top speed: 75 mph (121 km/h)
- Transmission: 5-speed chain drive manual
- Wheelbase: 56.5 in (1,440 mm)
- Weight: 213 lb (97 kg) (dry)
- Fuel capacity: 1.5 US gal (5.7 L; 1.2 imp gal)
- Related: Honda CR125M

The Honda CR250M is a two-stroke single-cylinder motorcycle manufactured by Honda from March 1973 until 1976, when it was replaced by the Honda CR250R.

== Background ==
Honda had developed its global motorcycle brand through track racing, with Soichiro Honda collecting the world's best engineers together to create winning road motorcycles such as the Honda RC116. However, Honda pulled out of motorcycle racing in 1967, leaving it with a world class development team with nothing to do. Up until this point, motocross had been dominated by four-stroke-powered machines, and had no official national championship in Japan. Further, Soichiro Honda had publicly announced that Honda would never build two-stroke-powered motorcycles.

The Japan Motorcycle Association introduced a domestic motocross championship from 1967, to which the group of Honda engineers - like their development counterparts at Suzuki and Yamaha - developed lighter weight two-stroke-powered machine. Suzuki's development programme had started in 1965, which by 1970 had produced the Suzuki RH70, which ridden by Belgium's Joel Robert won Japan its first FIM Motocross World Championship.

In August 1971, the Honda development team took a two-stroke prototype to a National Championship motocross race to Mine, Yamaguchi, where it was recognised as a Honda. As a result, Soichiro Honda gave his reluctant backing to producing not only a works competitive motocross racer, but also an out of the box version as well.

== Development ==
The Honda CR250M had a two-stroke 29 horsepower engine, and weighed in at 229 pounds (104 kg). Designed by Soichiro Miyakoshi, the prototype production machine began testing in Japan in 1971, and on California motocross tracks in 1972. The CR250M was Honda's first two-stroke production race bike, the first competition dirt bike that Honda built from scratch instead of adapting a street bike, and the first production motocrosser. A chrome-moly frame, aluminum bodywork and plastic fenders contributed to its light weight, even after restyling when initial tests showed the frame to be too fragile, potentially bending after less than an hour of riding.

== Production ==
Named the CR250M globally, it was subtitled the Elsinore in North America, after the offroad race in Lake Elsinore, California, the best-known off-road race of the late 1960s and early 1970s. The popularity of the CR250M and its derivatives soared after Gary Jones rode a stock machine to win the 1973 AMA 250 national motocross series.

In 1974 the CR250M was followed by its smaller version, the Honda CR125M, and the first US Honda factory that opened in 1979 in Marysville, Ohio built CR250Ms.

== Model codes ==
The 357 was released as a Honda CR250M in the years 1973 and 1974, and the 381 was released as a CR250M1 in 1975 and as a CR250M'76 in 1976.
