= SS Elsinore =

British steam tanker sunk in 1914

History

United Kingdom
- Name: Elsinore
- Namesake: Elsinore in Shakespeare's Hamlet
- Owner: Bear Creek Oil & Shipping Co
- Operator: CT Bowring & Co
- Port of registry: Liverpool
- Builder: Swan, Hunter & Wigham Richardson, Wallsend
- Yard number: 931
- Launched: 12 November 1913
- Completed: December 1913
- Identification: UK official number 135530; code letters DJQH
- Fate: sunk by gunfire, 11 September 1914

General characteristics
- Type: oil tanker
- Tonnage: 6,542 GRT, 4,169 NRT, 9,700 DWT
- Length: 420.5 ft (128.2 m)
- Beam: 54.6 ft (16.6 m)
- Depth: 32.4 ft (9.9 m)
- Decks: 2
- Installed power: 484 NHP
- Propulsion: 1 × triple-expansion engine; 1 × screw
- Speed: 10 knots (19 km/h)
- Notes: sister ships: Cordelia, Rosalind, El Toro, El Zorro

SS Elsinore was a British steam tanker that was built on Tyneside in 1913. Her career was cut short by a German cruiser sinking her off the Pacific coast of Mexico in September 1914.

== Building ==
Between 1912 and 1914 two Swan, Hunter & Wigham Richardson shipyards built a series of sister ships for CT Bowring & Co Ltd, a ship management company in Liverpool, England. The Wallsend shipyard launched Cordelia in April 1912, Rosalind in March 1913 and Elsinore in November 1913. The Neptune Yard in Low Walker launched El Toro in June 1913 and El Zorro in January 1914. Bowring used Shakespearean names for many of its ships. Cordelia is a character in King Lear, Rosalind is a character in As You Like It, and Elsinore is the setting for Hamlet. El Toro and El Zorro were Spanish language names, because Bowring's operated tankers under charter to and from Mexico.

All five ships had longitudinal framing. Cordelia, Rosalind and Elsinore had identical dimensions: 420.5 ft (128.2 m) registered length, 54.6 ft (16.6 m) beam and 32.4 ft (9.9 m) depth. El Toro and El Zorro were 420.1 ft (128.0 m) registered length, 54.4 ft (16.6 m) beam and 32.2 ft (9.8 m) depth.

Elsinore was built as yard number 931. She was launched on 12 November 1913 and completed that December. Her tonnages were 6,542 GRT, 4,169 NRT and 9,700 DWT. Her furnaces were equipped to burn either coal or oil. The Wallsend Slipway & Engineering Company built her a three-cylinder triple-expansion engine. It was rated at 484 NHP, drove a single screw, and gave her a speed of 10 knots (19 km/h).

Different companies owned the ships that Bowring's managed. The Bear Creek Oil and Shipping Co Ltd owned Elsinore. She was registered in Liverpool. Her UK official number was 135530 and her code letters were DJQH.

== Charter ==
Bowring's had ordered Elsinore to fulfil an agreement of 1 August 1912 with the Union Oil Company, whose fleet of 14 oil tankers shipped oil from California to Oregon, Washington, British Columbia, Hawaii, and Latin America. Bowring's was to provide a "good British Tank Steamer, to be built....and estimated to have a total deadweight carrying capacity of about 9,700 tons". Union Oil would charter her from Bowring's for seven years for £2,850 per calendar month, starting from her date of delivery.

The builders delivered Elsinore to the Bear Creek Oil and Shipping Co early in December 1913. The Pacifie Creosote Company immediately chartered her to take creosote to its facilities in the Pacific Northwest. She loaded her cargo in Amsterdam and left on 20 December 1913 for St. Helens, Oregon and Seattle. She arrived there at the end of February, unloaded her cargo and proceeded to San Francisco, where she arrived on 1 March.

Elsinore's charter was transferred to the Union Oil Company on 12 March 1914, when she left San Francisco for Balboa via Port San Luis, where she loaded oil at Union Oil's major oil storage and shipping facility. She reached Balboa on 27 March, unloaded her cargo, and left for California on 30 March. There Elsinore loaded 57,000 barrels of fuel oil and left for Chile on 21 April, arriving in Antofagasta on 4 May. She left Antofagasta three days later and reached San Francisco on 27 May. A week later she loaded 55,000 barrels of fuel oil at Port San Luis, and left again for Chile, reaching Antofagasta on 25 June and proceeding to Iquique, wher she left on 29 June. Elsinore reached Port San Luis, where she loaded more oil and left for Balboa, where she arrived on 30 July 30, discharged her cargo, and left on 1 August.

== Loss ==
On 22 August Elsinore loaded 60,000 barrels of fuel oil in Port San Luis: 35,000 for Guatemala, and 25,000 for Nicaragua. She left on 24 August, and reached Corinto, Nicaragua on 4 September. After unloading her cargo, Elsinore left port on 6 September, bound for Port San Luis in water ballast. In August the Admiralty had given her Master appropriate directions, and she sailed with reduced lights, but he chose to cut straight across the Gulf of California instead of keeping in Mexican territorial waters as long as possible.

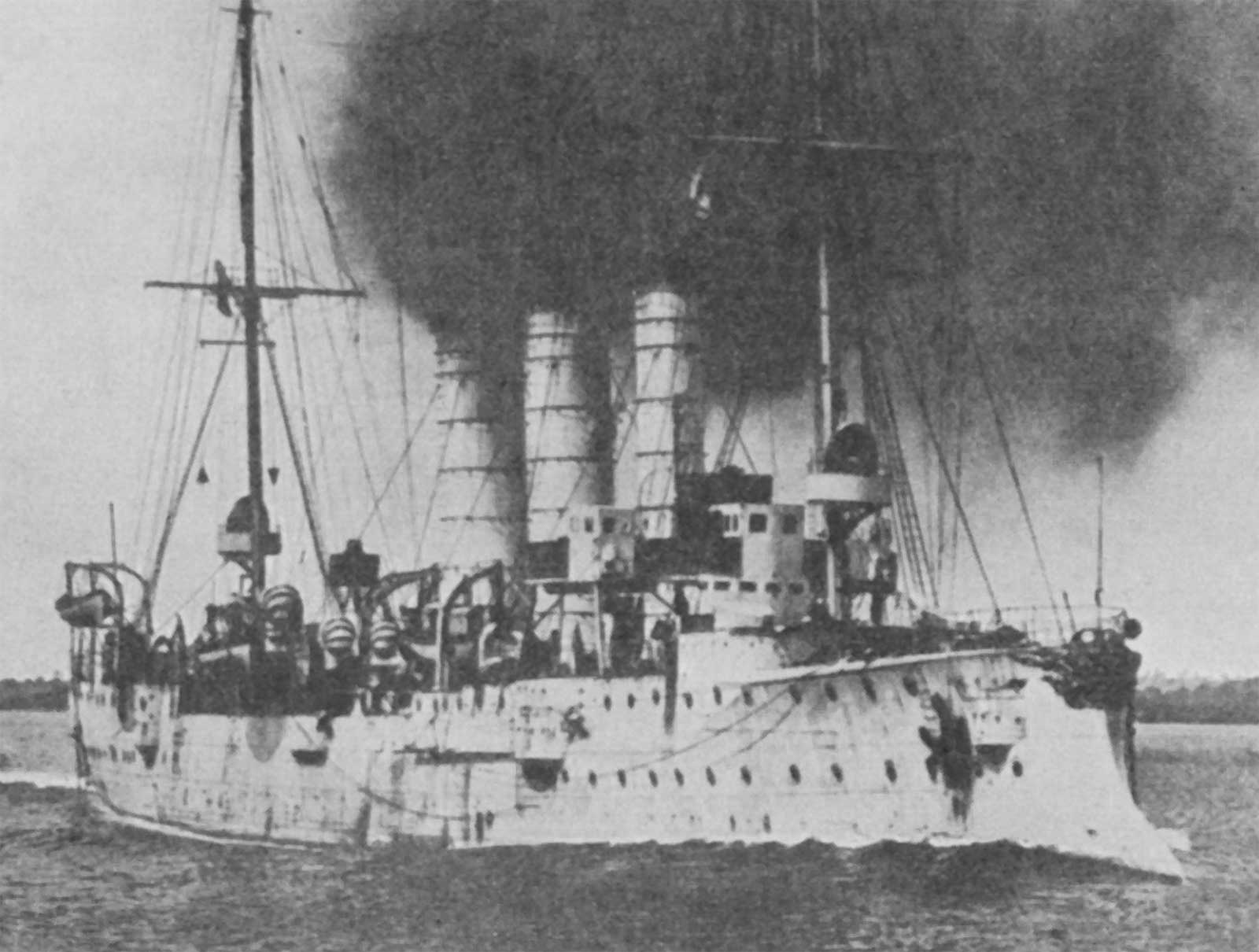
SMS Leipzig

In the early hours of 11 September, in heavy rain, Elsinore lookouts failed to see the German cruiser Leipzig, steaming en route to Panama, early enough to attempt to alter course. At 2:30, about 73 nautical miles (135 km) southwest of Cape Corrientes in approximate position 19°39′N 106°46′W, Leipzig sighted Elsinore at short distance and ordered her to stop. Leipzig captured Elsinore's crew and sank her by gunfire. Leipzig put Elsinore's crew ashore on one of the Galápagos Islands, whence they travelled to Guayaquil, arriving on 2 October.

== Fate of sister ships ==
Elsinore was the first of the five sisters to be lost. U-boats sank El Zorro in December 1915 and Rosalind in April 1917. El Toro was wrecked on the west coast of Ireland in January 1917.

Cordelia survived the First World War. In 1930, Italian owners bought her and renamed her Poseidone. In 1944 a mine sank her in Venice, but after the Second World War she was raised and repaired. She was scrapped in 1953 in Savona.

== Bibliography ==
- Bisher, Jamie (2016). The Intelligence War in Latin America, 1914–1922. Jefferson, NC: McFarland & Company. ISBN 978-0786433506.
- "British merchant Ships lost to enemy action Part 1 of 3". British Vessels Lost at Sea, 1914–1918. London: HMSO. 1919 – via Naval-History.net.
- Fayle, C Ernest (1920). History of the Great War. Seaborne Trade. Vol. I: The Cruiser Period. London: John Murray.
- Lloyd's Register of Shipping. Vol. I–Steamers. London: Lloyd's Register of Shipping. 1914 – via Internet Archive.
- Mercantile Navy List. London. 1914 – via Crew List Index Project.
