= Honda CR125M =

1973 motorcycle by Honda

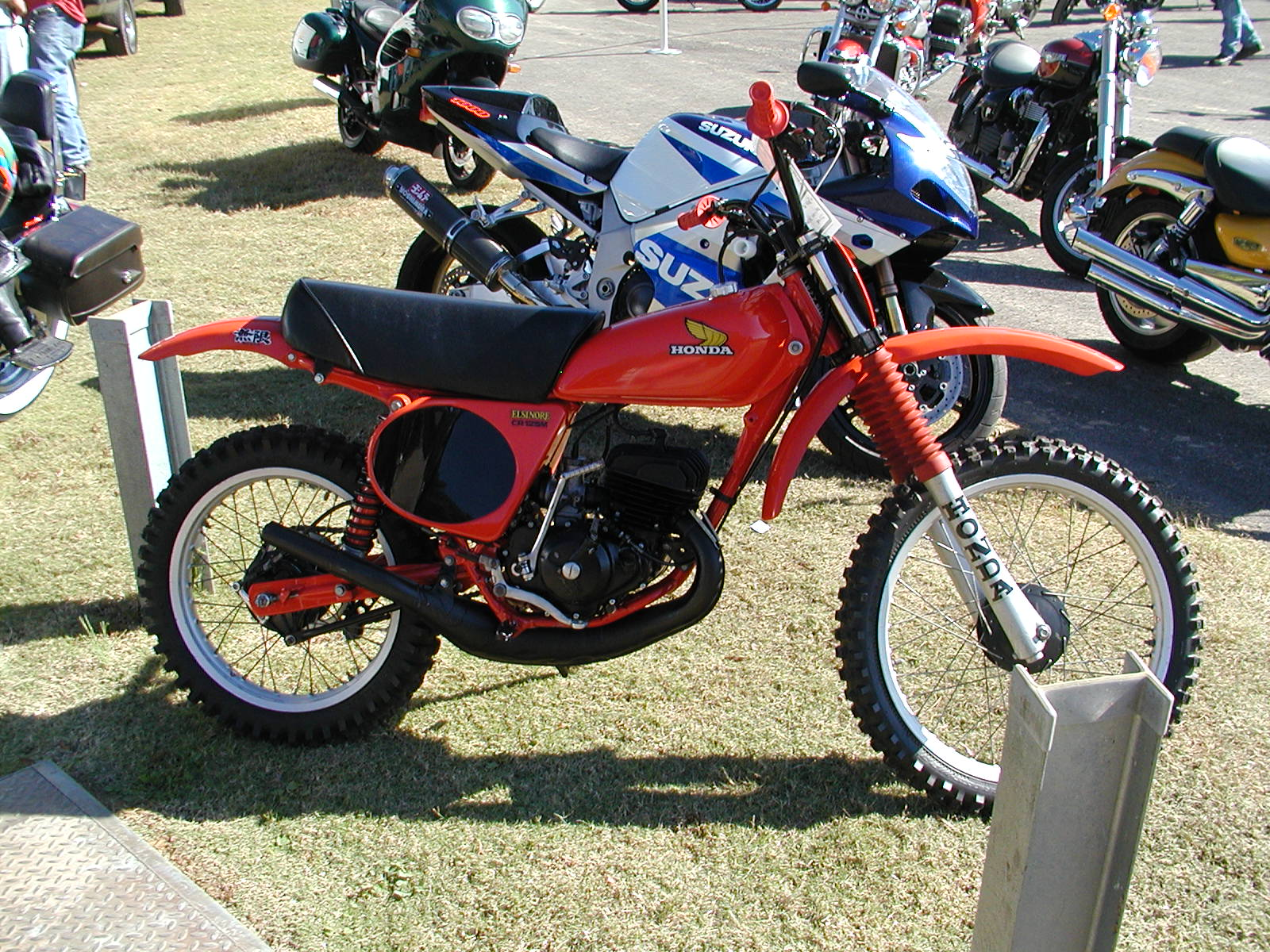
CR125M Elsinore

The Honda CR125M Elsinore is a motorcycle designed and manufactured by Honda and released in late 1973. Modeled after the first Elsinore, the Honda CR250M, the 124cc version sold for $749 at its debut. A CR125M ridden by Marty Smith won the 1974 AMA National Motocross championship, spurring the Elsinore's popularity. The September 1973 issue of Dirt Bike argued that the 125 Honda Elsinore was the only off-road bike on the market at the time that offered both speed and reliability. Other Japanese 125cc motocross bikes available at the time would have needed major suspension, motor, and chassis upgrades to be used for motocross racing.

The CR125M was built in Japan and was extensively tested on motocross tracks in Japan and California. It had a chrome-moly tube frame, a six-speed gearbox, four-point adjustable Showa shocks, plastic fenders and a magnesium alloy engine casing for weight economy. The bike weighed 179 pounds dry. With a full tank, the CR125M weighed 188 pounds. The CR125M's single-cylinder, two-stroke 124cc engine weighed 46 pounds, inclusive of the 28mm Keihin carburetor.

== Specifications ==
- Engine type: 125cc air cooled single-cylinder two-stroke producing 22 hp (claimed)
- Weight (dry): 154 lbs
- Carburetion: 28mm Keihin
- Transmission: close ratio six speed
- Bore and Stroke: 56 x 50mm
- Brakes: front and rear drum brake
