= Honda Odyssey (North America) =

Minivan by Honda for the North American market

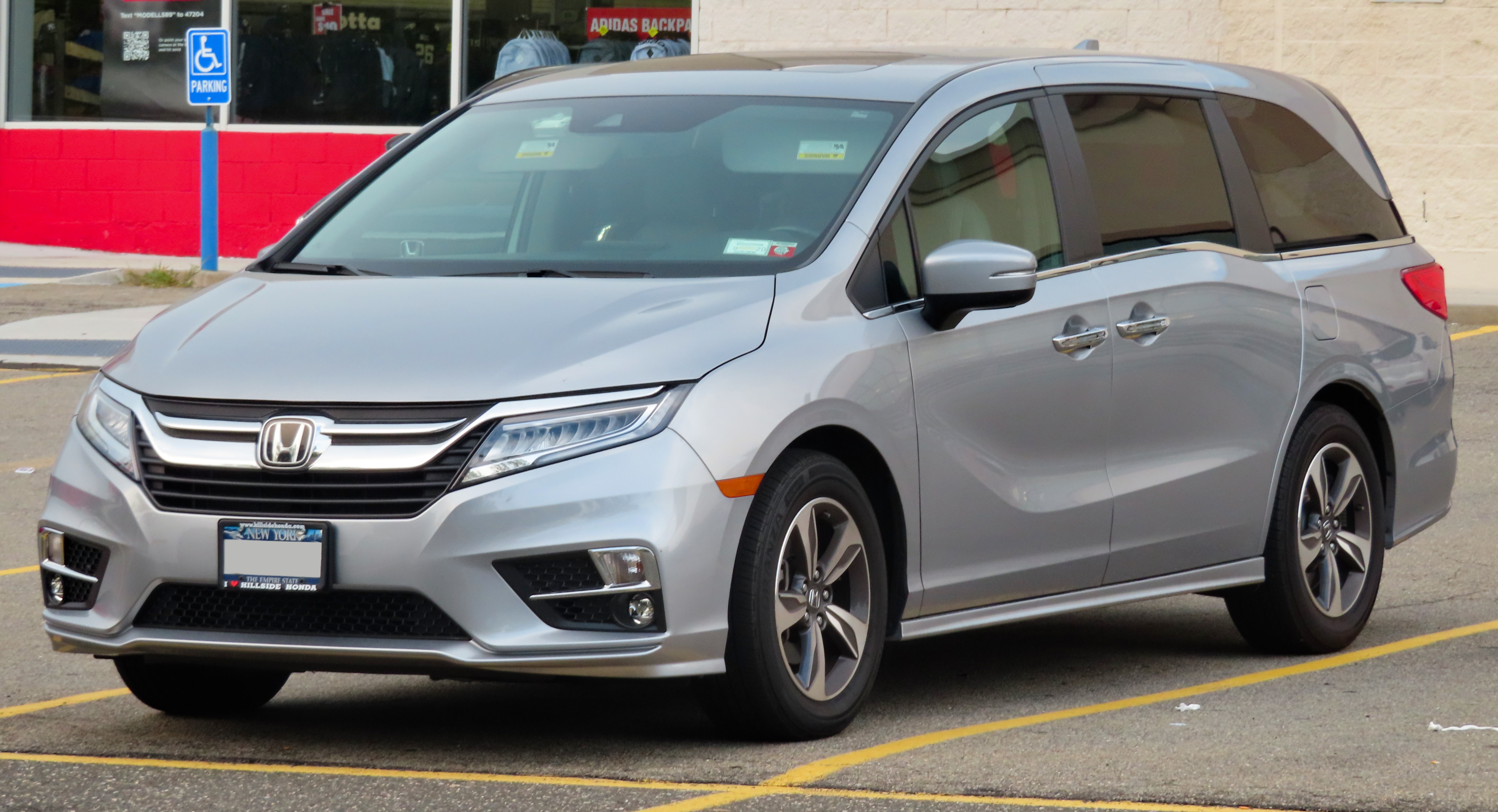
- 2018 Honda Odyssey Touring

Overview
- Manufacturer: Honda
- Production: 1994–present
- Model years: 1995–present

Body and chassis
- Class: Minivan
- Body style: 5-door minivan
- Layout: Front-engine, front-wheel-drive

The Honda Odyssey is a minivan manufactured by Japanese automaker Honda and marketed for the North American market, introduced in 1994.

The Odyssey was conceived and engineered in Japan after the country's economic crisis of the 1990s, which constrained the vehicle's size and concept and dictated its manufacture in an existing facility with minimal modification. The result was a smaller minivan, in the compact MPV class, that was well received in the Japanese domestic market, but less well received in North America. The first-generation Odyssey was marketed in Europe as the Honda Shuttle.

Subsequent generations diverged to reflect market variations, and Honda built a plant in Lincoln, Alabama, United States, that could manufacture larger models. Since 1998, Honda has marketed a larger (large MPV-class) Odyssey in North America and a smaller Odyssey in Japan and other markets. Until 2005, the North American Odyssey was also sold in Japan as the LaGreat (ラグレイト, Ragureito). Both versions of the Odyssey were sold in Japan at Honda Clio dealership locations. Both versions of the Odyssey are sold in the Middle East.

== First generation (RA; 1995) ==
First generation
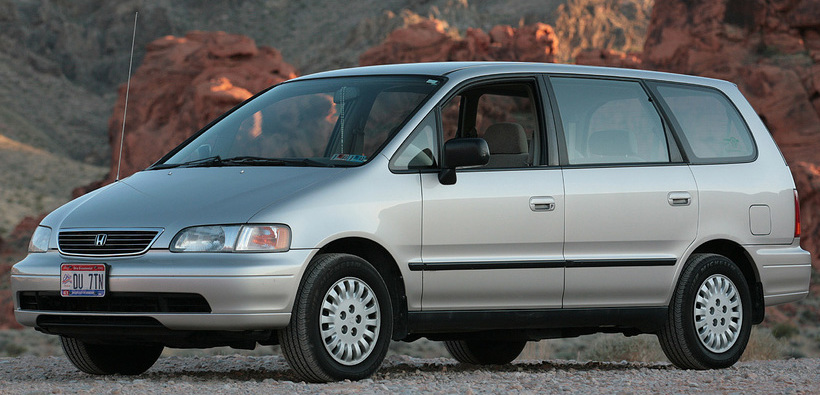

Overview
- Model code: RA1-5
- Also called: Honda Shuttle; Isuzu Oasis; Gaodeng Honda Odyssey GDK6481A (China); Sanjiu 3-Nine Odyssey (China)
- Production: 1994–1998 (Honda Odyssey); 1996–1999 (Isuzu Oasis)
- Model years: 1995–1998 (Honda Odyssey); 1996–1999 (Isuzu Oasis)
- Assembly: Japan: Sayama (Honda Sayama Factory); China: Zhanjiang, Guangdong (CKD)
- Designer: Motoaki Minowa (1991)

Body and chassis
- Related: Honda Accord; Isuzu Aska

Powertrain
- Engine: 2.2 L F22B6 I4; 2.3 L F23A7 I4
- Transmission: 4-speed automatic

Dimensions
- Wheelbase: 2,830 mm (111.4 in)
- Length: 4,755 mm (187.2 in) (1994–96); 4,765 mm (187.6 in) (1996–98)
- Width: 1,793 mm (70.6 in)
- Height: 1,641 mm (64.6 in)

Chronology
- Successor: Honda Odyssey (RA6-RA9; International); Honda LaGreat (JDM); Honda Odyssey (RL1; America)

The 1995 Odyssey was introduced in 1994 as Honda's first minivan. It was based on the Accord platform, with a 4-cylinder engine, all-disc anti-lock braking, all wishbone suspension, and a four-speed automatic transmission with a steering-column-mounted shifter and a hill-hold feature marketed as Grade Logic. This class of vehicles would subsequently become known as Compact MPV. The design featured unibody construction, dual airbags, dual gloveboxes, dual zone heating and cooling with 20 percent greater capacity than an Accord's system (overhead rear fan-speed adjustment control, and main control switch over the front-seat passenger), conventional rear swing-open rather than sliding doors, and a third row seat that could fold and tumble into a compartment beneath the floor — the spacesaver spare tire carried inside, on the right, rear wall of the cabin.

Honda marketed the first-generation Odyssey in two trim levels. The LX accommodated seven passengers with two front buckets, a removable three-seat middle bench, and a 2-seat third row bench. The EX accommodated six passengers (using two removable second row captain's chairs in lieu of the bench) and offered additional equipment including a roof rack, alloy wheels, power driver's seat height adjustment, power moonroof, remote keyless entry system, fog lights (for later model years), body-colored side moldings and mirrors, map lights, and 200-watt AM/FM/cassette six-speaker audio system. The Odyssey was only sold with four-cylinder engines and front-wheel drive in North America; in Japan the four-cylinder models could also be had with four-wheel drive and a V6-engined version was introduced in October 1997.

Isuzu offered a rebadged version of the Odyssey from 1996 to 1999 as the Isuzu Oasis.

=== Development ===
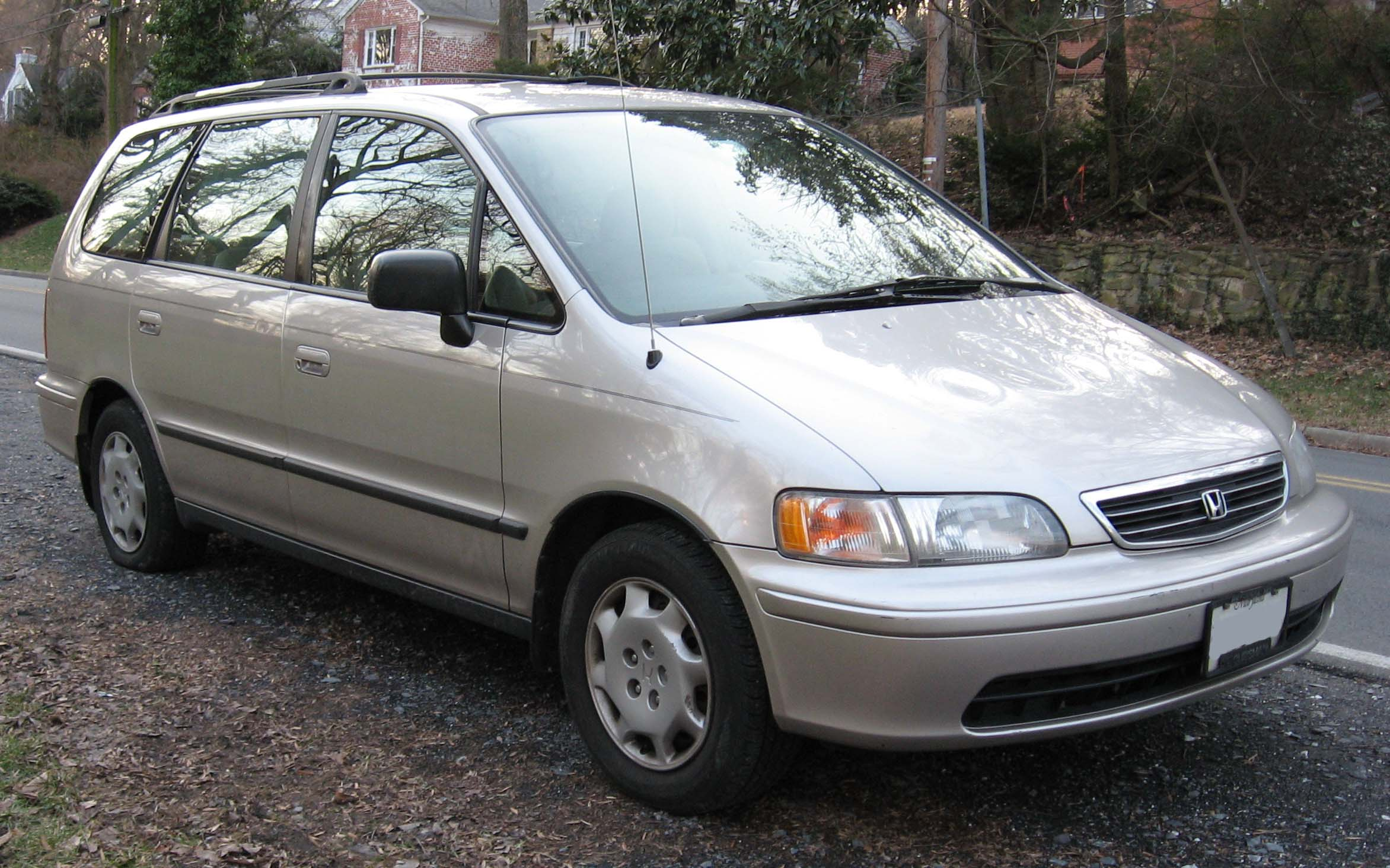
1998 Honda Odyssey (US)

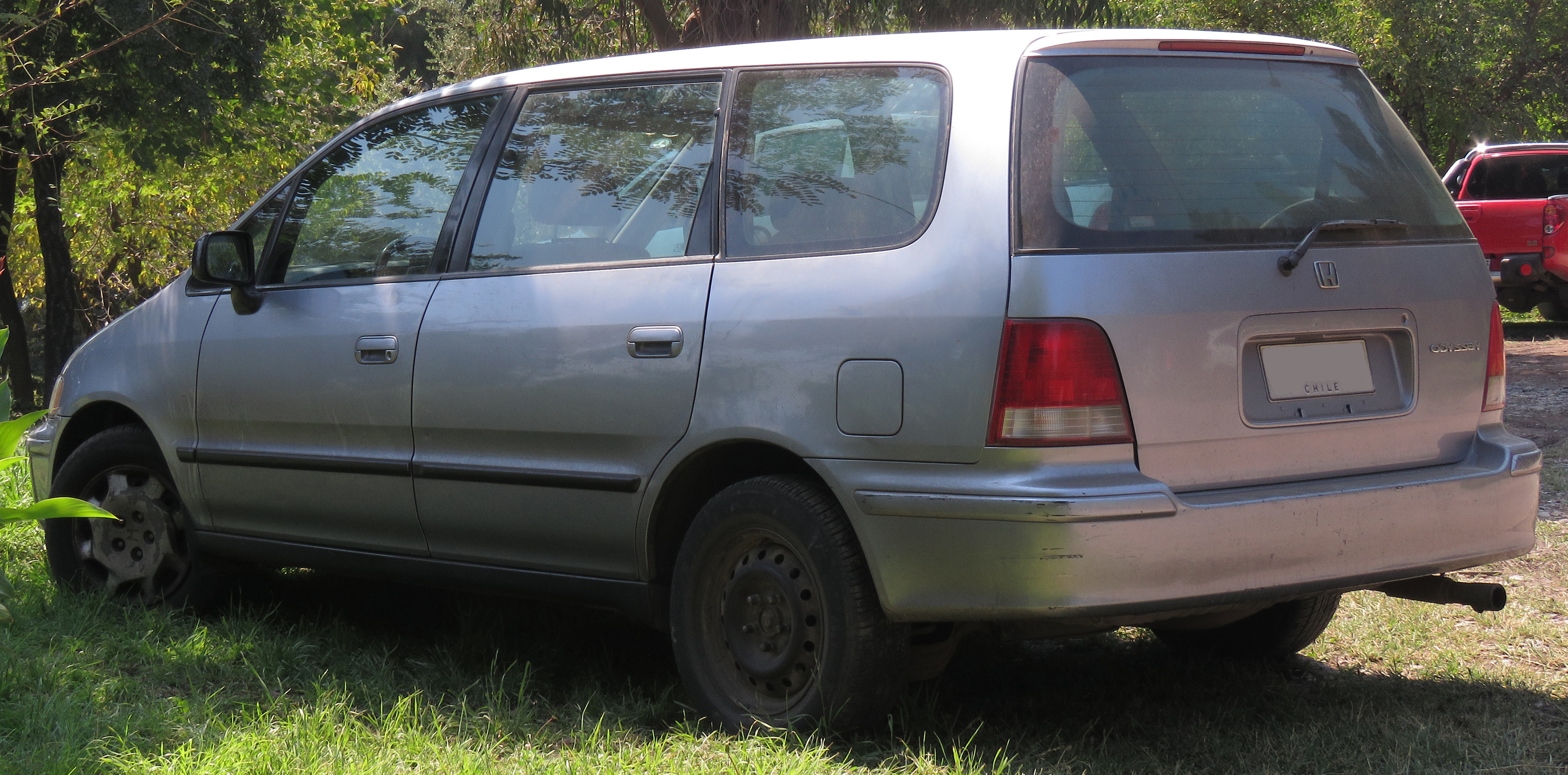
Rear view

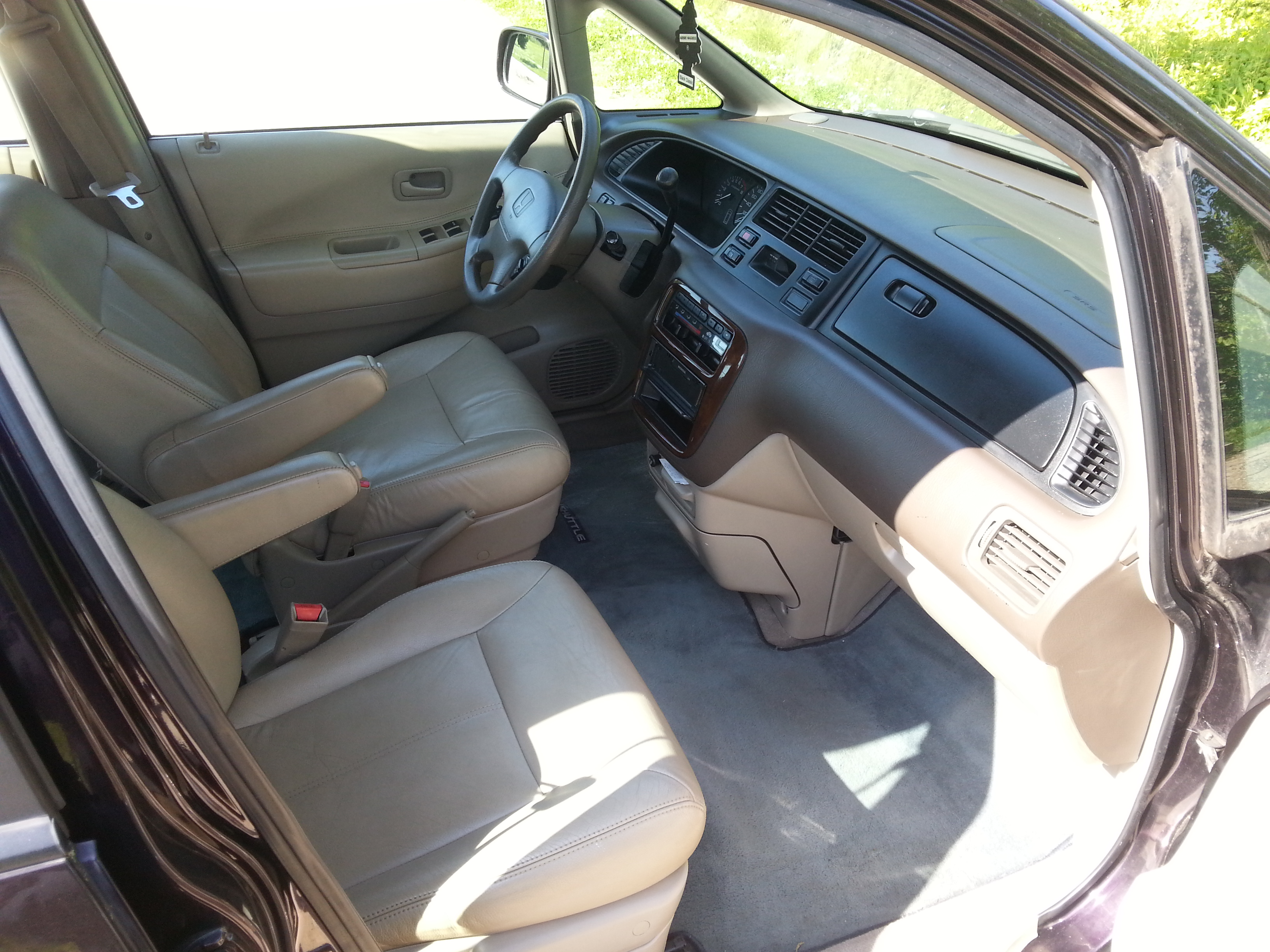
Interior (Shuttle, Europe)

The Odyssey was engineered by Kunimichi Odagaki, then a chief engineer at Honda's Research and Development Center, along with a team of 20 members — in the wake of Japan's recession of the early 1990s and the possibility of a 25-percent tariffs if the minivans were imported to the U.S. as light trucks. In the course of developing the Odyssey, it became paramount to circumvent these obstacles and conceive a feasible interior package that could use existing manufacturing facilities with minimal investment.

Odagaki traveled to the U.S. in September 1990 with a small sub-team to conduct a review of the U.S. minivan market. At the project's inception, the team was considering variations for the project from 4-cylinder to V6 alternatives, when the project was canceled.

Odagaki continued working with an "underground" team, using as its design credo the concept of a "personal jet" — which in turn led to the car's original PJ concept code-name. Odagaki conceived the idea of the third-row seat folding into a floor compartment, and he worked with his team to include a "center aisle." The team determined a minimum interior height of 1.2 meters to retain the aisle and favored a design with a low floor — to provide ease of passenger entry and exit, easy garage-ability, low roof-loading height, as well as enhanced productivity on the assembly line.

The team worked to convince management of the project's viability, using extensive illustrations, a one-quarter scale model and a full-size foam model. By April 1991, Odagaki won permission to develop a prototype.

After bringing the right-hand drive prototype to the U.S., Odagaki won the support of American Honda. Production was officially launched on October 20, 1994 — the first Honda model in to be released at the same time through Honda's three Japanese distribution channels (Primo, Clio, Verno), marketing the Odyssey through the three channels under the same name.

In addition to being named after the epic, it also shares its name with a series of Honda ATVs, the reusing of Honda Motorcycle trademarks being a common way of naming new cars. The Odyssey name was previously considered for a new SUV, but the focus group found the journey themed name puzzling and was named the Honda Passport instead.

At its debut, the Odyssey won the Japan Car of the Year Award (Special Category) and the RJC New Car of the Year Award. By September 1997, the Odyssey had sold more than 300,000 units, becoming Honda's fastest-selling new car and breaking the Civic's record.

=== Taxi service ===
In 1996, New York City's Taxi and Limousine Commission (TLC) expanded the number of licensable automobiles, approving the first generation Odyssey for use in the city's taxi fleet — the Odyssey having been recommended by the seven-year-old grandson of a TLC advisory commission member. Initial test riders identified advantages over then-prevalent Chevrolet Caprice and the Ford Crown Victoria taxi models — including greater height (for a better view of the road), headroom, rear legroom, rear footroom (the front-wheel-drive Odyssey having a flat floor) and cargo space over the sedans, as well as air-conditioning vents in the rear, which the sedans did not offer.

=== Isuzu Oasis ===
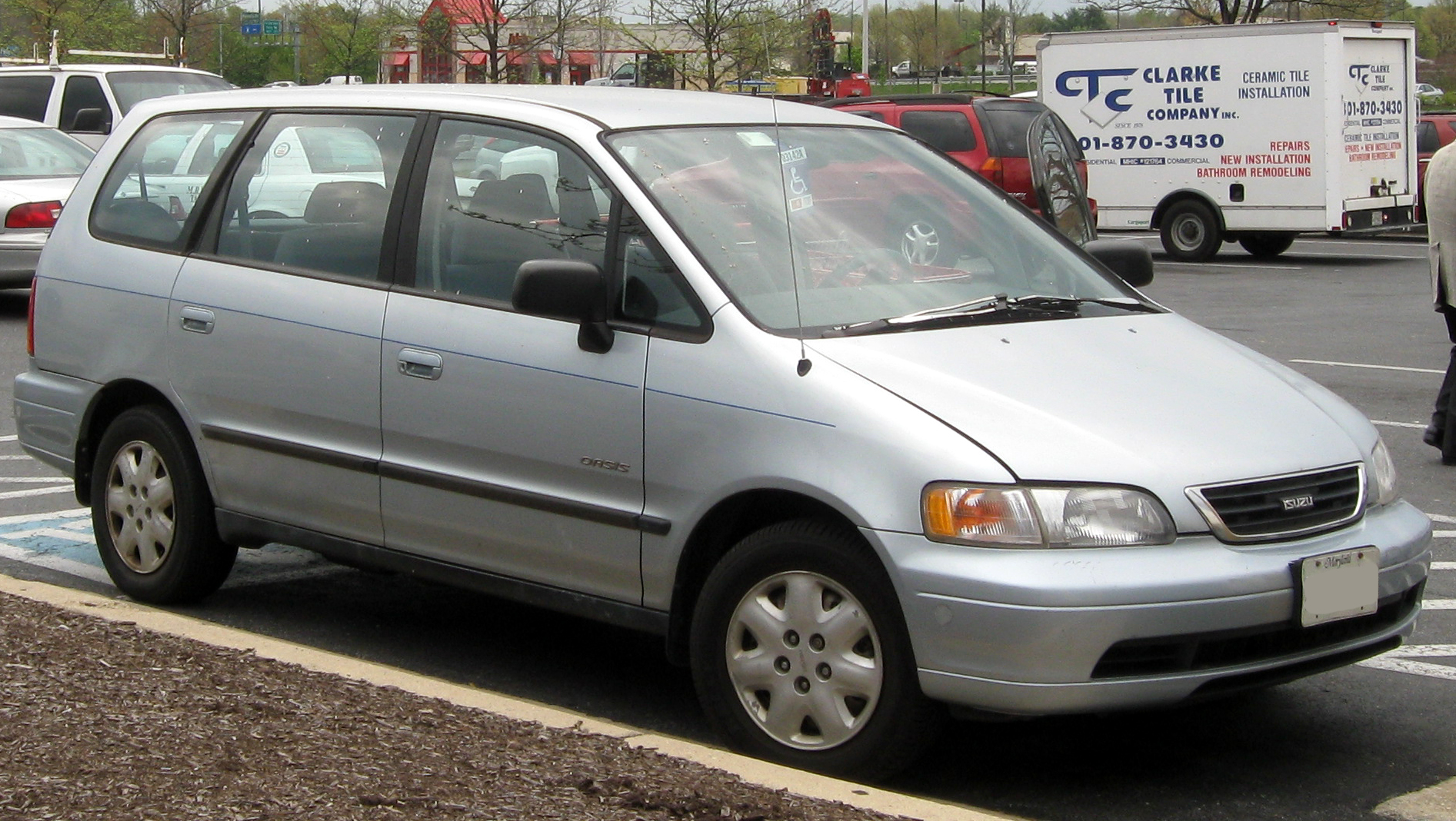

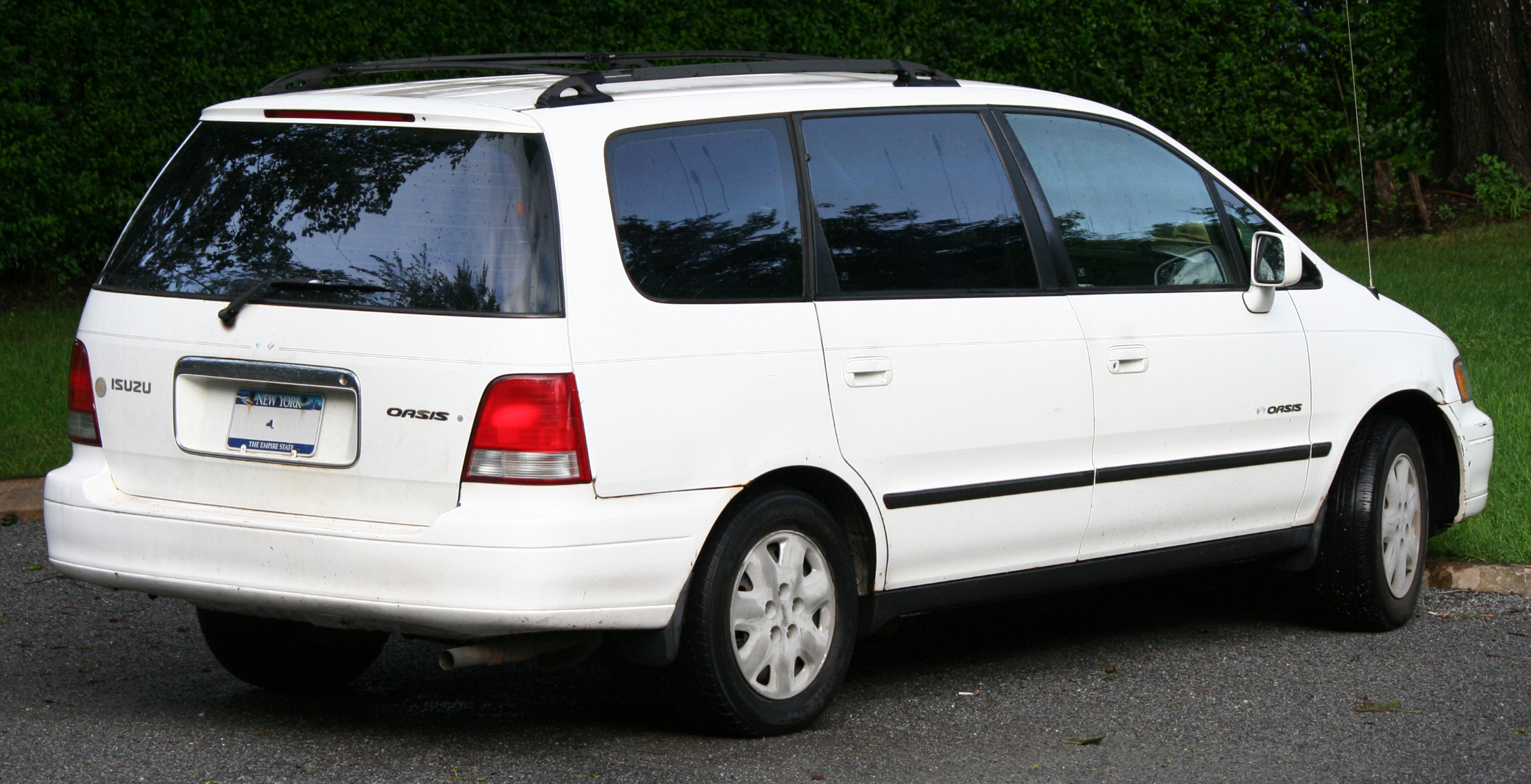
Isuzu Oasis

In December 1992, Isuzu announced its exit from passenger car market in 1993. In 1994, Isuzu negotiated with Honda to sell a version of Honda Odyssey by its U.S. dealers.

The Isuzu Oasis was a minivan marketed in the United States by Isuzu from 1996 to 1999 as a rebadged variant of the first-generation Honda Odyssey, the only minivan marketed by Isuzu. They were notably used in New York City as taxicabs during the late 1990s and early 2000s.

After the Honda Odyssey was redesigned for 1999, Isuzu continued to market the Oasis for another year with minor changes. Later Oasis models came with a 2.3L VTEC engine similar to the engine found in the sixth generation Honda Accord.

== Second generation (RL1; 1999) ==
Second generation (North America)
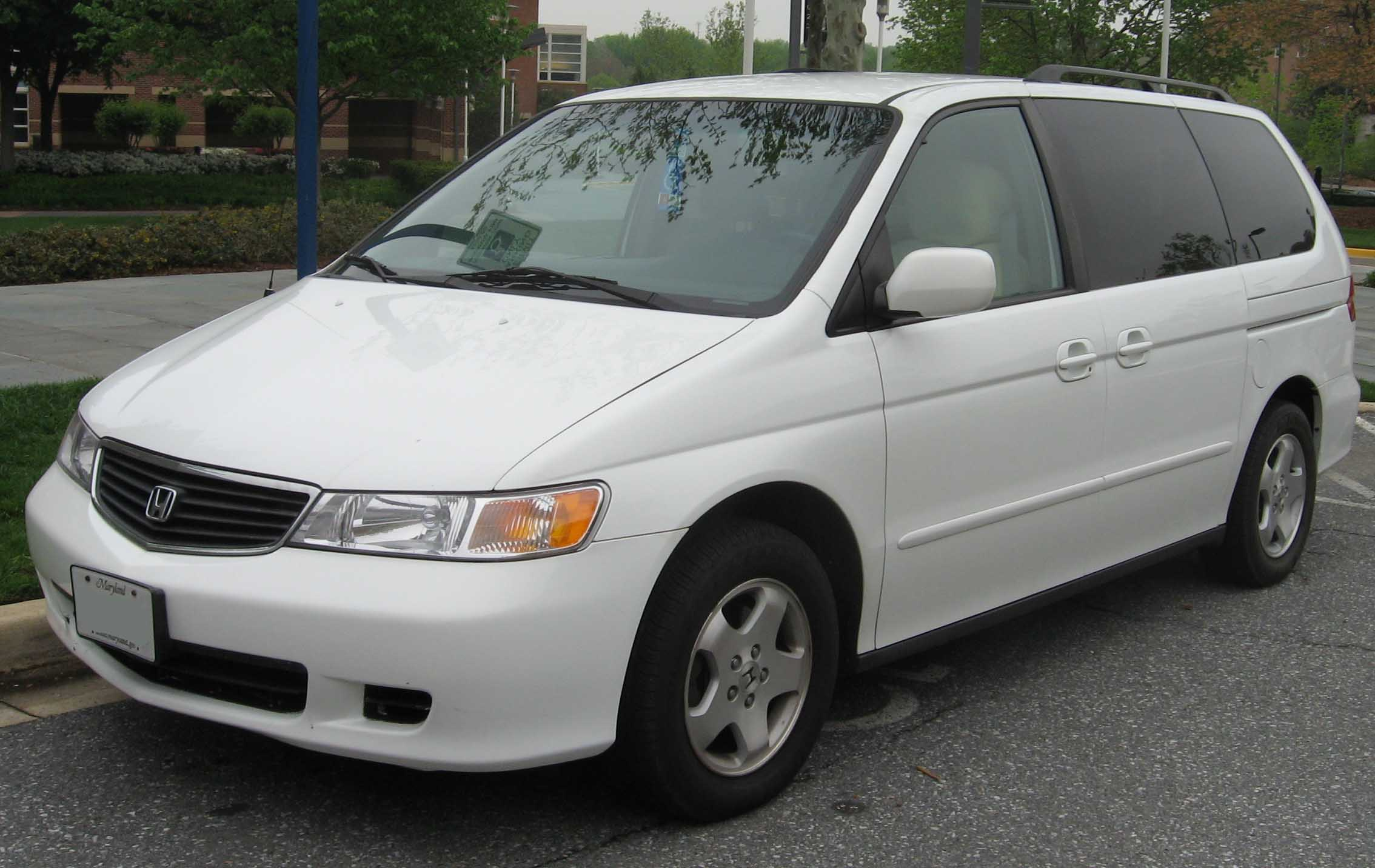

Overview
- Model code: RL1
- Also called: Honda LaGreat (Japan)
- Production: 1998–2004
- Model years: 1999–2004
- Assembly: Canada: Alliston, Ontario; United States: Lincoln, Alabama
- Designer: Mitsuhiro Honda, Tamotsu Okamoto (1996)

Body and chassis
- Related: Honda Accord; Acura TL

Powertrain
- Engine: 3.5 L J35A1 V6 (1999–2001); 3.5 L J35A4 V6 (2002–2004)
- Transmission: 4-speed B7XA automatic (1999–2001); 5-speed BYBA automatic; (2002–2004)

Dimensions
- Wheelbase: 118.1 in (3,000 mm)
- Length: 201.2 in (5,110 mm)
- Width: 75.6 in (1,920 mm)
- Height: 69.7 in (1,770 mm); 68.5 in (1,740 mm) (LX)

Chronology
- Successor: Honda Elysion (replaced LaGreat in JDM)

The second generation North American market Odyssey was first assembled in Canada as a 1999 model mainly for North America between 1998 and 2004 — and exported to Japan as the LaGreat between 1999 and 2004. The television ad campaign for the new Odyssey evoked moments from the film 2001: A Space Odyssey, particularly the extended space-station docking and lunar landing sequences to the soundtrack of The Blue Danube waltz.

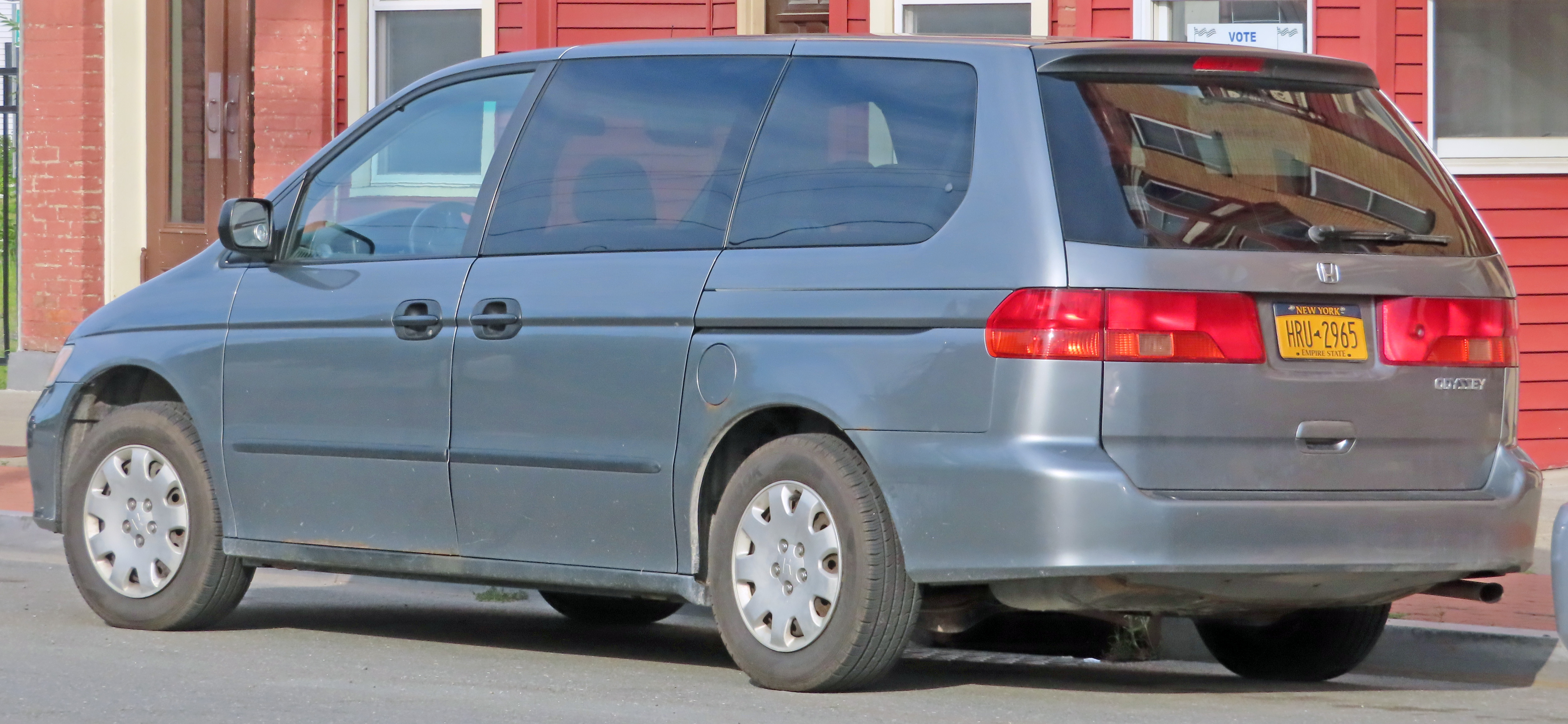
Pre-facelift Honda Odyssey LX

By its second generation, the Odyssey was considerably larger than its predecessor, and adopted sliding rear doors instead of hinged ones, simpler front strut suspension in place of upper and lower control arm front suspension of the 1995–1998 model, and a 210 hp (157 kW) V6 engine instead of the original four-cylinder. The Odyssey offered two sliding doors as standard equipment, whereas some minivans of the time only offered one, a second door being optional on lower trims. It offered power sliding doors for the EX trim and manual ones for the base LX trim. It kept the fold-into-the-floor rear seat, an innovation adopted by many other minivans. This generation also introduced the Honda Satellite-Linked navigation system (including Point of Interest (POI) search, which allowed drivers to locate businesses and landmarks by category, name, or phone number), for the 2000 model year, as an option for the EX trim, which became the first navigation system ever offered in any minivan or Honda vehicle. However, the power moonroof from the previous generation's EX trim was removed.

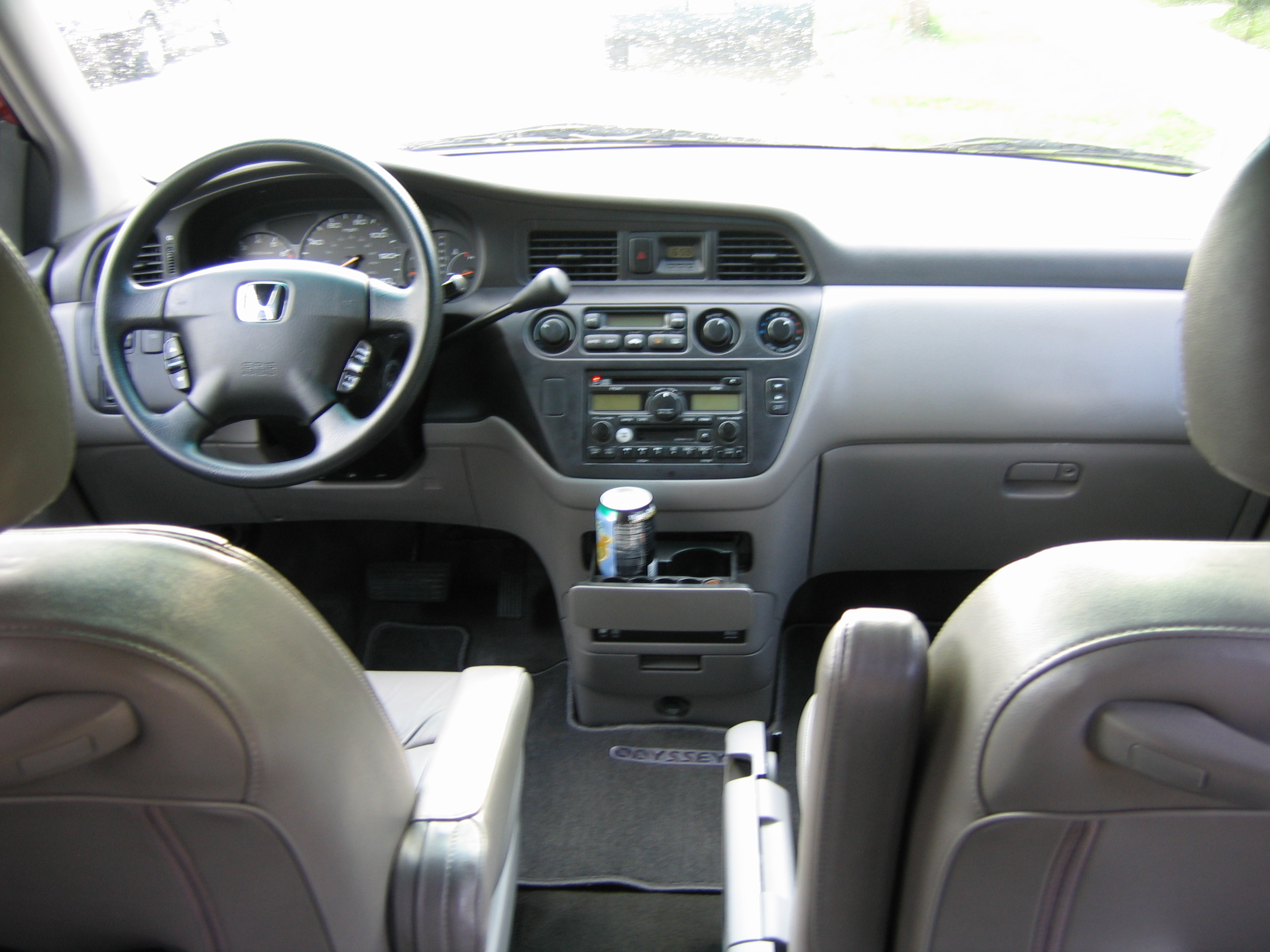

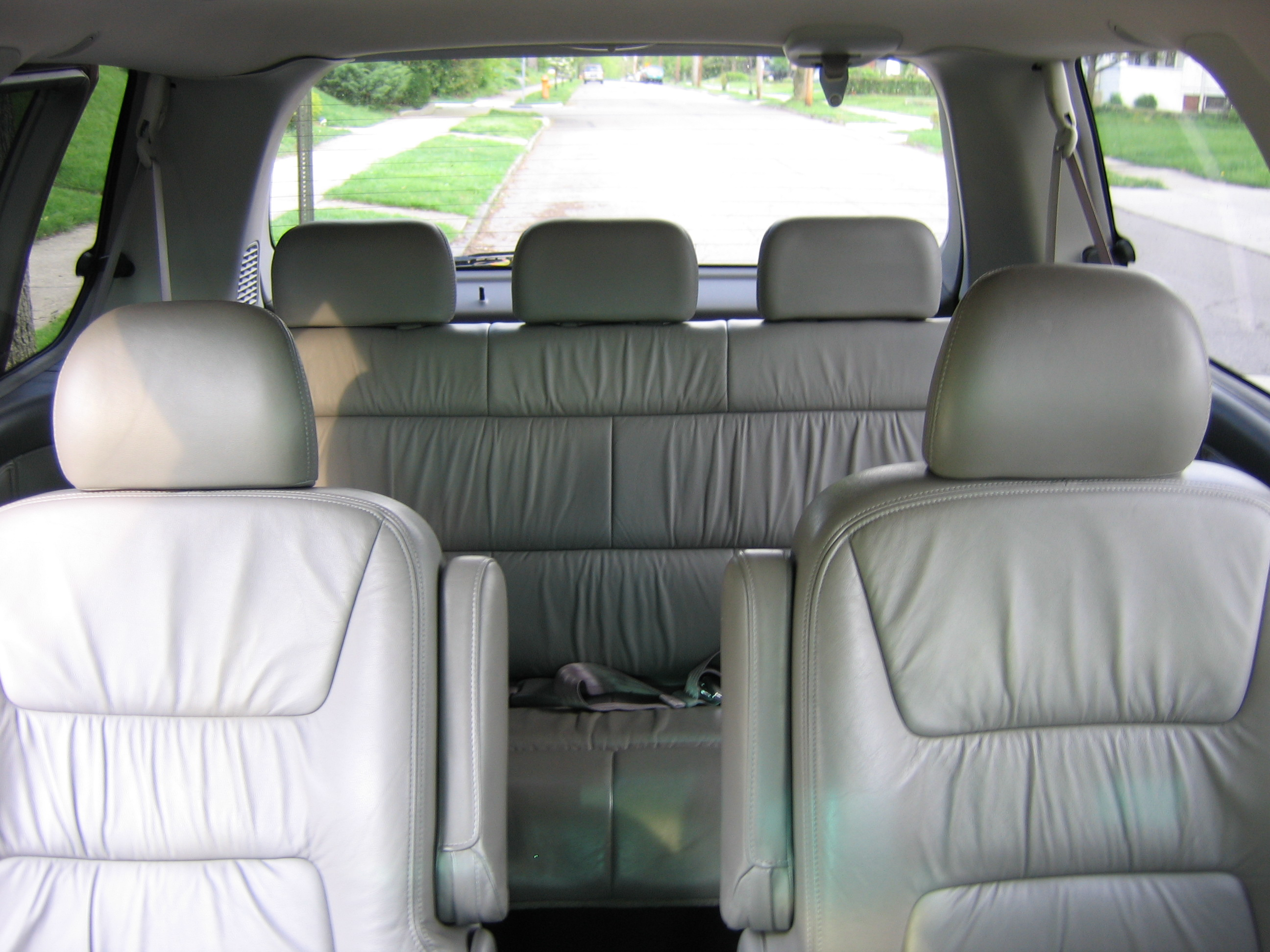
Interior

The 2004 model was the only second generation Odyssey model year to receive reliability ratings of five out of five according to Automotive Information Systems. IIHS gave the Odyssey a Good rating in the Frontal Offset Test from 1999 to 2004.

The second generation was praised for its powerful V6, its handling from its four-wheel independent suspension, and its features such as a large cabin, power sliding doors (manual sliding doors on LX models) and the stow-away third-row seat. Some found it noisier than competitors. It won consecutive Edmunds.com Editors' Most Wanted awards from 1999 to 2003 in the minivan category.

This is also the only generation of the Honda Odyssey where the power windows are only on the driver's and front passenger's doors.

=== 2002 facelift ===
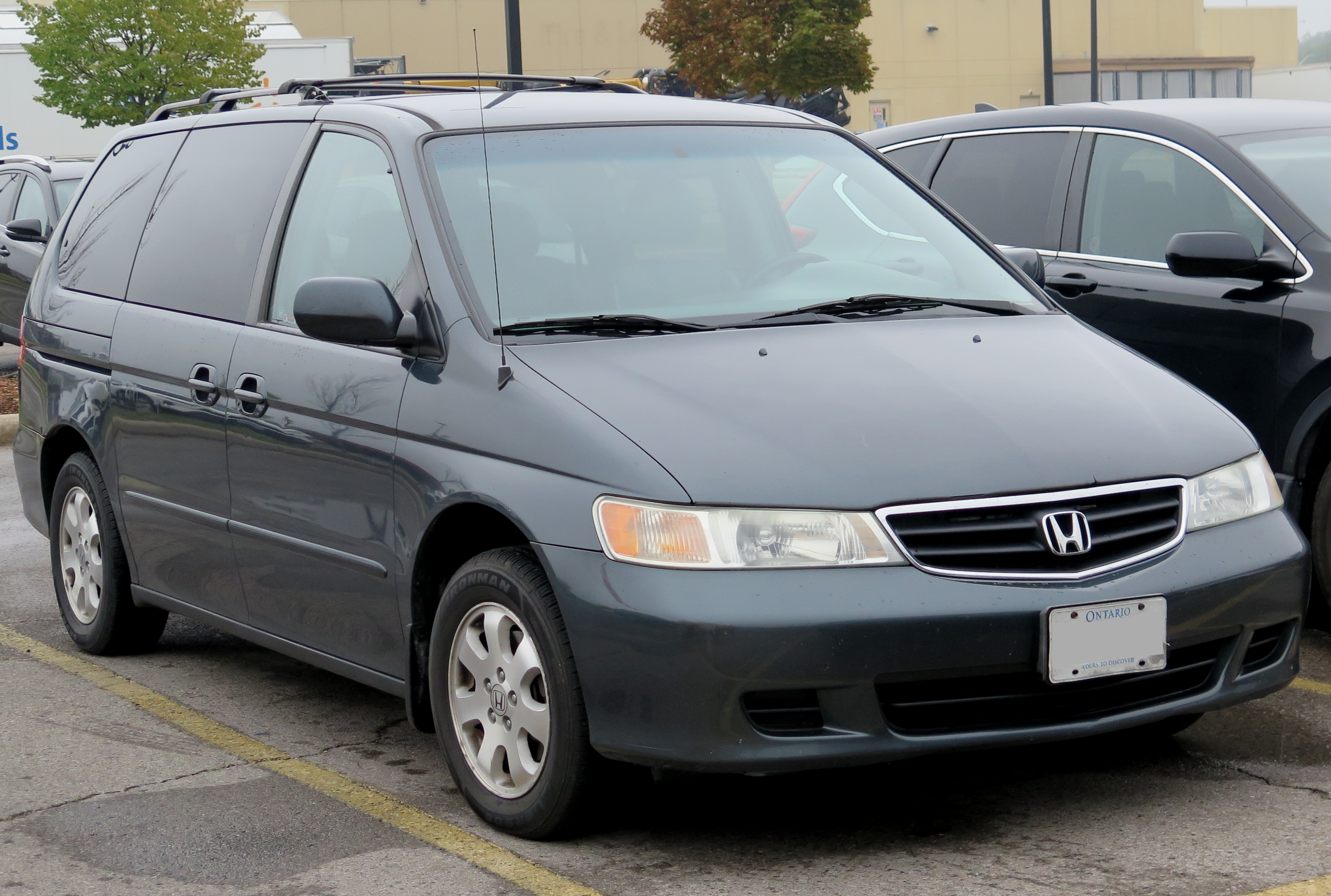
Facelifted Honda Odyssey EX-L (Canada)

The Odyssey received a significant increase in power from 210 to 240 hp (157 to 179 kW) in late 2001 for the 2002 model year. Some major upgrades included the addition of a third trim, EX-L, introducing leather seats to the Odyssey for the very first time, shifting the Navigation option from EX to EX-L, as well as a DVD-based entertainment system option for EX-L models without navigation. Also added was a five-speed automatic transmission, side torso airbags (not side curtain airbags), rear disc brakes, and a few minor cosmetic improvements on the outside as well as the inside. Other than an automatic power driver's window and a revised 5 speed transmission introduced in late 2003 in the 2004 model year, the Odyssey remained unchanged for 2003 and 2004, before being replaced with the third generation model.

=== Transmission problems ===
The 4-speed automatic transmission in 1999 to 2001 models had serious problems with transmission durability. Honda spokesman Mike Spencer stated that four-speed models were afflicted with a bad bearing that could break apart, scattering fragments of metal that clogged fluid passageways in the transmission, causing it to shift erratically. Honda responded to the problems by extending the warranty on the transmission on American 1999–2001 models to 7 years or 100,000 miles (160,900 km). A class action settlement further extended coverage to 109,000 miles (175,400 km) or 93 months for some 1999–2001 Odysseys in the US. Canada is not included. The five-speed automatic was first installed in the Odyssey for the 2002 model, but general reliability of the 1999–2004 transmission was poor according to Consumer Reports. Spencer said that the five-speed models typically were damaged by premature wear of the third-gear clutch pack. As the clutch friction material abraded, it scattered bits inside the transmission case, clogging fluid lines and causing erratic shifting. Drivers might suffer slipping, poor or no shifts, or sudden down-shifts from fifth gear to second gear.

Under some conditions, a different 5-speed transmission problem arose. Second gear could overheat and break, causing the transmission to lock. An oil jet was added to lubricate this gear but this did not solve the third gear clutch problem. The addition of the Honda transmission cooler with the towing package still allows transmission fluid temperatures that are too high. But it was required along with a power steering cooler for any towing, or the warranty would be void. The Acura CL, TL, MDX, and Honda Accord suffered similar problems.

== Third generation (RL3/4; 2005) ==
Third generation (North America)
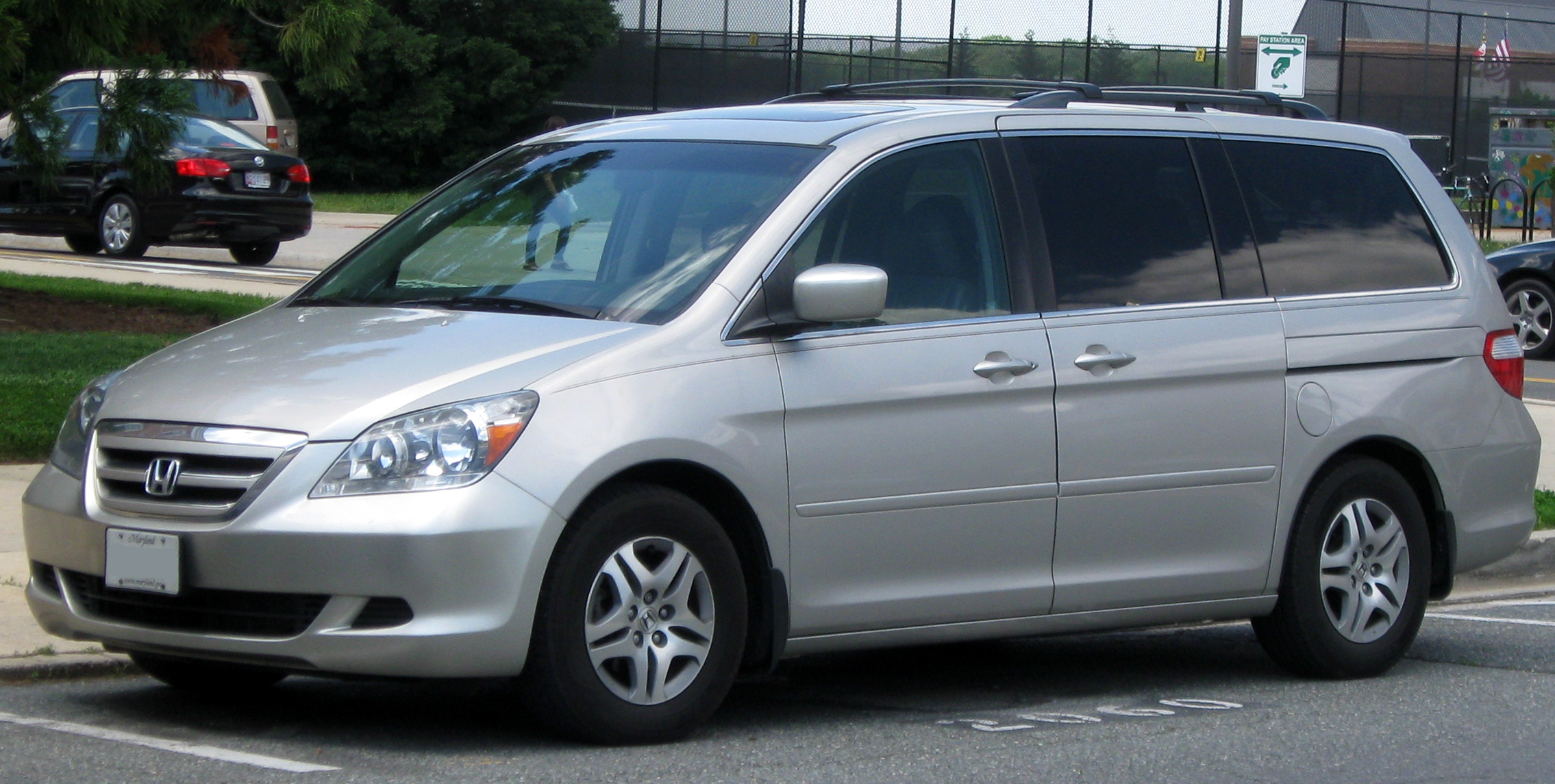

Overview
- Model code: RL3/RL4
- Production: August 2004 – 2010
- Model years: 2005–2010
- Assembly: United States: Lincoln, Alabama (HMA)
- Designer: Akio Fumiiri (2002)

Body and chassis
- Related: Honda Pilot; Acura MDX

Powertrain
- Engine: 3.5 L J35A6 V6 (LX, EX); 3.5 L J35A7 V6 (EX-L, Touring)
- Transmission: 5-speed automatic

Dimensions
- Wheelbase: 118.1 in (3,000 mm)
- Length: 2005–07: 201.0 in (5,105 mm); 2008–10: 202.1 in (5,133 mm)
- Width: 77.1 in (1,958 mm)
- Height: 70.0 in (1,778 mm); 68.8 in (1,747.5 mm) (LX)

Honda introduced the third generation of the Odyssey for the 2005 model year. It grew in width and weight but retained the previous generation's length and interior space.

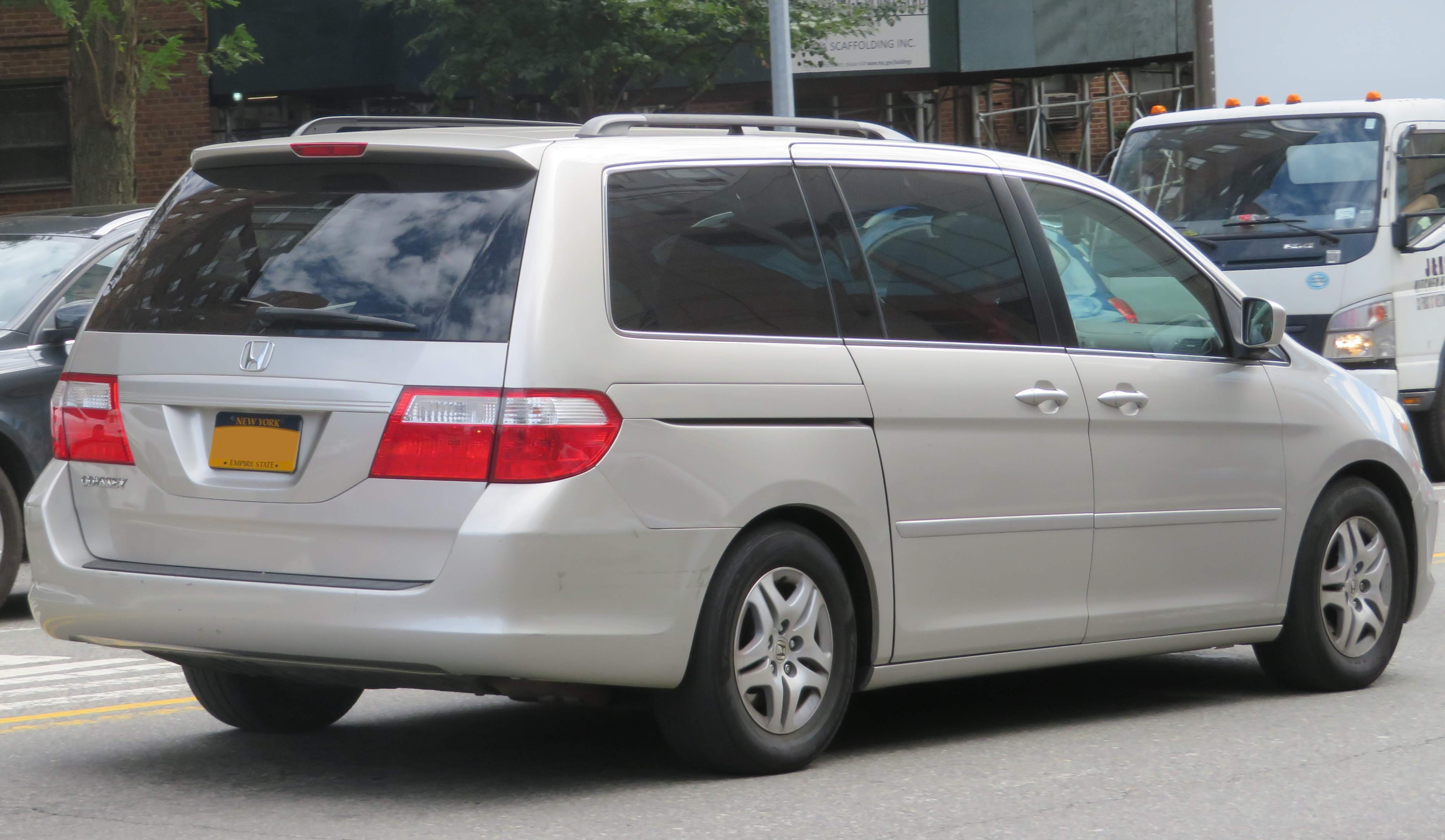
Pre-facelift Honda Odyssey EX-L

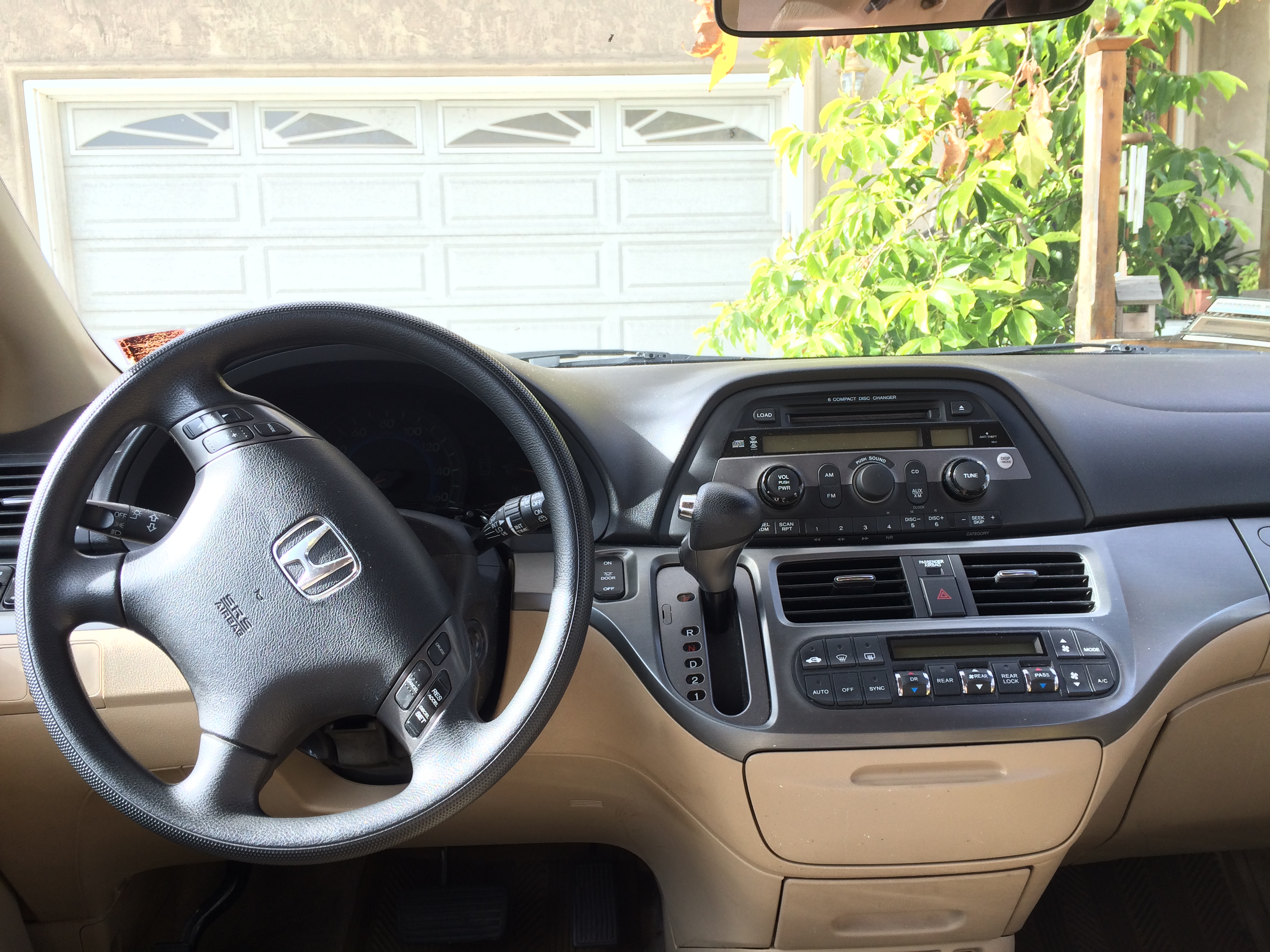
Interior

Honda introduced the ACE body structure to the third generation Odyssey, which was later used on the eighth generation Civic. Side-curtain airbags and electronic stability control are included in all models. Both features were previously unavailable.

Trim levels included LX, EX, EX-L, and Touring. The Touring trim level was new for this generation, being the most featured and luxurious, it incorporated features such as special "Touring" badging right below the "Odyssey" logo, run-flat tires, power tailgate, power adjustable pedals, memory seats, and chrome accents on the tailgate and sliding door interior handle trim.

A trip computer (range, fuel MPG, etc.) was introduced for the 2005 redesign, but specifically for the Touring trim (in its Programmable Multi-Information Display located in the instrument cluster). The LX, EX, and EX-L retained the same basic trip data.

A backup camera was introduced for the EX-L and Touring models with navigation system (integrated into the 8-inch screen).

For this generation, the EX-L model could be upgraded with either a DVD Entertainment System or a DVD Entertainment and navigation system bundle and returned the power moonroof.

The 2005 Honda Odyssey’s navigation system added several advanced features, including a voice recognition, Zagat Survey ratings for restaurants, giving users access to reviewer-based dining recommendations directly in the vehicle. In addition, it included Unverified Area Routing, a feature that enabled navigation guidance in newly built or unmapped areas by using estimated road paths when full map data was not yet available.

Additional features included integrated sunshades in the rear doors, windows that roll down in the second row, and the third row 'Magic Seat' was changed from a straight bench design to a split 60/40 design to allow for variable folding. The headrests could be left in place when tumbling the rear seat. Some notable features of the redesign were dual glove boxes and an in-floor lazy susan storage compartment, located in the previous generation's spare tire well. Third generation models offered a dashboard-mounted shifter, instead of a column-mounted shifter. The second row bucket seats do not fold into the floor. A 'Plus-One' jump seat was standard on EX and EX-L models for an eighth passenger. Touring model came with a center storage compartment.

Engine power was increased to 255 hp (190 kW) (re-rated to 244 hp (182 kW) by the new SAE J1349 guidelines, and used in 2006+ model descriptions), the EX-L and Touring models comes with i-VTEC engine that includes Honda's cylinder deactivation system called Variable Cylinder Management or VCM. This enabled this van to receive U.S. Environmental Protection Agency (EPA) fuel economy ratings of 20 mpg_{‑US} (12 L/100 km; 24 mpg_{‑imp})/28 mpg_{‑US} (8.4 L/100 km; 34 mpg_{‑imp}) for the 2005 model year. (19 mpg_{‑US} (12 L/100 km; 23 mpg_{‑imp})/25 mpg_{‑US} (9.4 L/100 km; 30 mpg_{‑imp}) for non VCM equipped LX and EX models) These numbers were re-rated in 2007, bringing numbers to 17/25 for VCM equipped models, and 16/23 for non VCM equipped models. Models equipped with i-VTEC and VCM engine (EX-L and Touring) uses a H5 transmission with lower ratio for fourth and fifth gears, boosting acceleration during high-speed travel. These ratios expand the range of the three-cylinder mode that dramatically enhances fuel economy, thereby realizing both powerful acceleration and low fuel consumption. Acceleration was slightly slower than generation two models. It was rated top pick in minivan category in Consumer Reports 2005 annual auto issue.

For the 2006 model year, the "Odyssey" logo was moved from the right side of the back door to the left side, tether anchors were added to the 3rd row outboard seats. Leather trimmed steering wheel and shift knob was added to all EX-L models, which was previously available only on the Touring. The DVD Entertainment System and XM Satellite Radio was added as standard feature on Touring model, previously available only in combination with a navigation system.

For 2007 models, the H5 transmission was redesigned on all models with a stronger case, different gear ratios and four shafts versus three in the earlier H5 transmissions. The four shaft H5 transmissions are much more robust and do not exhibit the same failure rate as the three shaft H5. In addition, a mass air flow sensor (MAF) was added to the engine air intake system. Tilt and telescoping steering wheel, a center pocket coin holder and a Tire Pressure Monitoring System (TPMS) was added on all trim levels.

Problem areas included body integrity, which includes paint wear and rusting, body hardware bumpers being loose, audio system, brakes and suspension according to the Consumer Reports issue of April 2006. According to the online edition of Consumer Reports in June 2016, transmission problems were better than average for 2006 models. Crash test ratings have been five star in every test but the 2005 had a safety concern. "During the side impact test, the driver door became unlatched and opened. A door opening during a side impact crash increases the likelihood of occupant ejection."

The Odyssey won a spot on Car and Driver's 5 Best Trucks for the past three years, as well as a host of other awards. It was the top-ranked minivan in the US News charts. The 2007–09 Odyssey was the best-selling minivan in the United States.

=== 2008 facelift ===
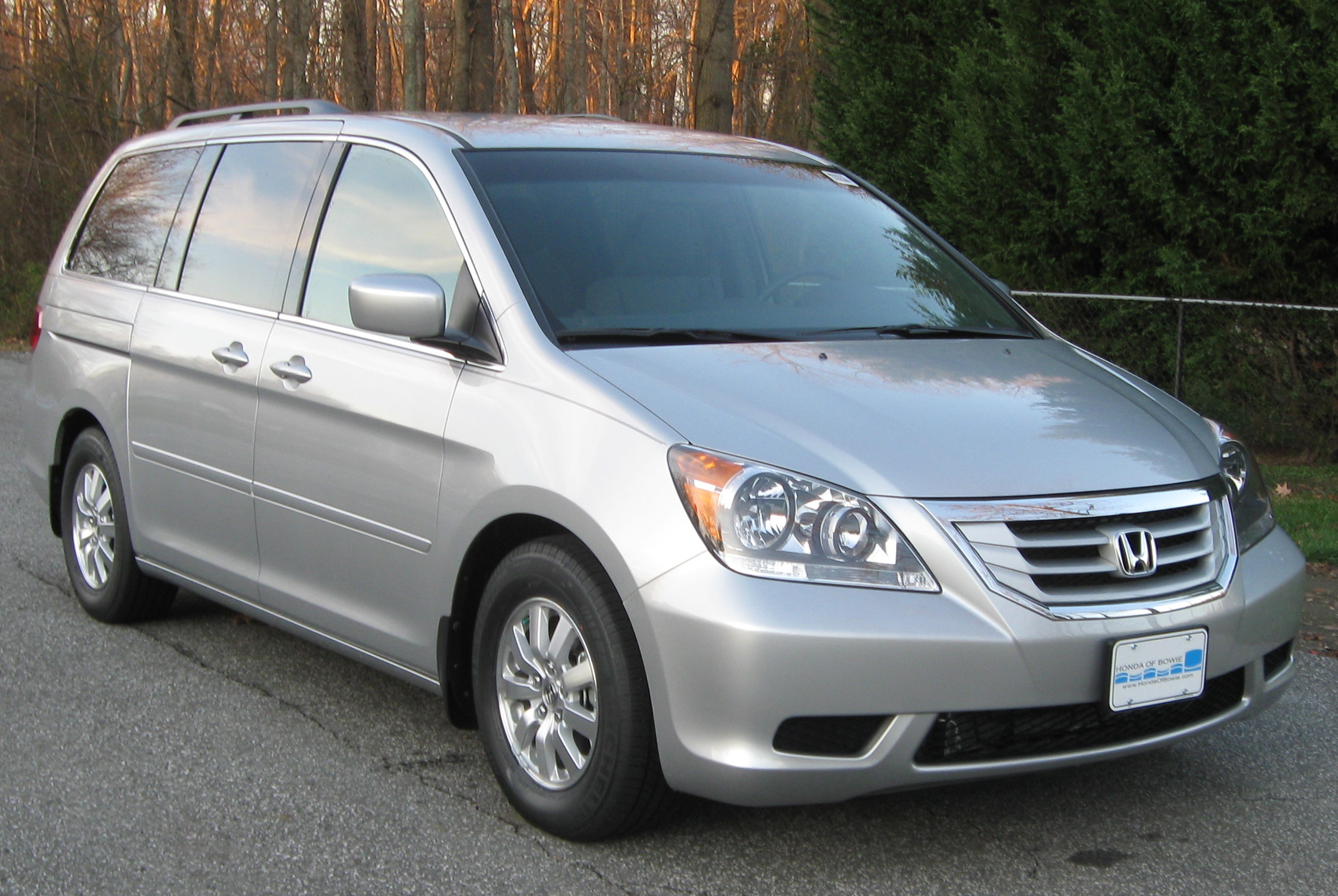
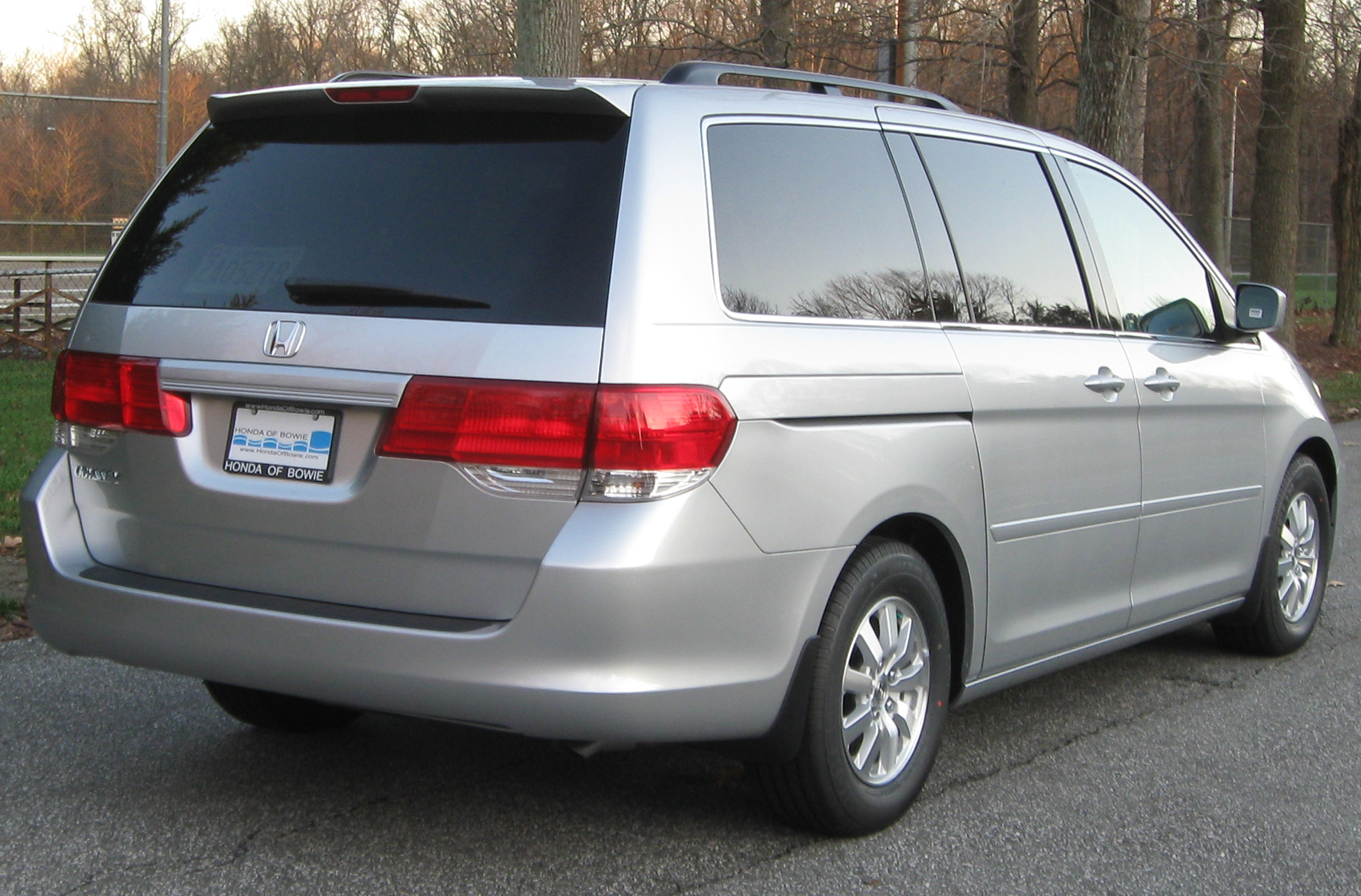
Facelifted Honda Odyssey EX

For 2008 model year, the Odyssey received a facelift. All models were equipped with active front head restraints, daytime running lights, and a redesigned dashboard, grille, and tail lights. An audio AUX jack became standard equipment. The backup camera, previously only included with navigation system models, was integrated into the rear-view mirror of the EX-L without the navigation system. Touring models featured full Bluetooth support for all Bluetooth-equipped devices, the navigation system was made a standard feature, and the design of the special Touring badging was updated and moved to the right side of the back door. EX, EX-L, and Touring models came standard with the updated 'Plus One' jump seat with added storage features. Automatic climate control for the rear seats, a feature previously exclusive to Touring models, was expanded to non-Touring models equipped with a tri-zone climate control system.

EX-L and Touring models received a revised version of the existing J35A7 engine, with VCM added to one cylinder in the front bank so the engine could run on 3 or 4 cylinders depending on engine load.

In Canada, an entry-level DX trim was added alongside the LX, EX, EX-L, and Touring trims for the 2008 to 2010 model years. The DX lacks features such as the "Second-Row Plus One Seat with storage", conversation mirror with sunglasses holder, tinted glass, roof rails, and has black body moldings.

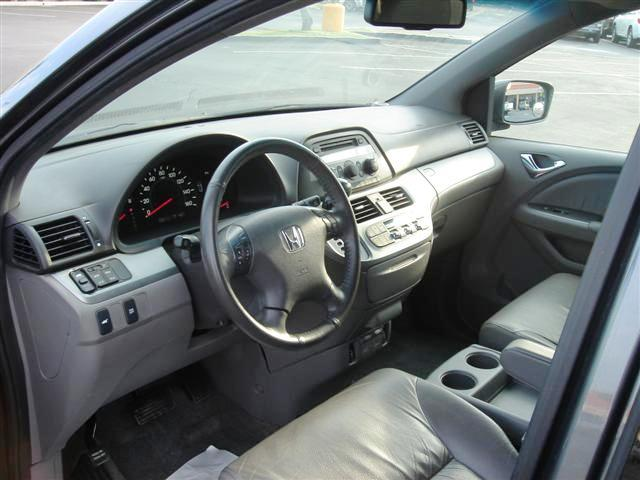
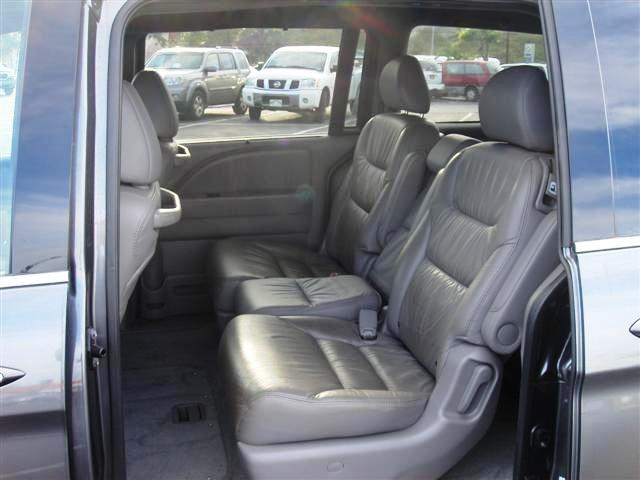
Interior (EX-L, facelift)

Beginning in 2008 for the 2009 model year, the power tailgate, which was previously exclusive to Touring models, was added as a standard feature on EX-L models. Bluetooth HandsFreeLink, previously exclusive to Touring, was included on EX-L models with the navigation system.

In Canada, the LX trim was dropped in 2009 for the 2010 model year, and an SE Odyssey NHL edition replaced the EX (being identical to the 2008–09 EX in all respects but with a rear entertainment system and NHL badges). In the United States, for the 2010 model year, the DVD Entertainment System was added as an option for the EX trim, while it is still standard on the Touring.

The Michelin PAX run-flat tire system, which was previously standard on Touring models, was made optional on 2008-2009 Touring models before ultimately being discontinued entirely for 2010.

== Fourth generation (RL5; 2011) ==
Fourth generation (North America)
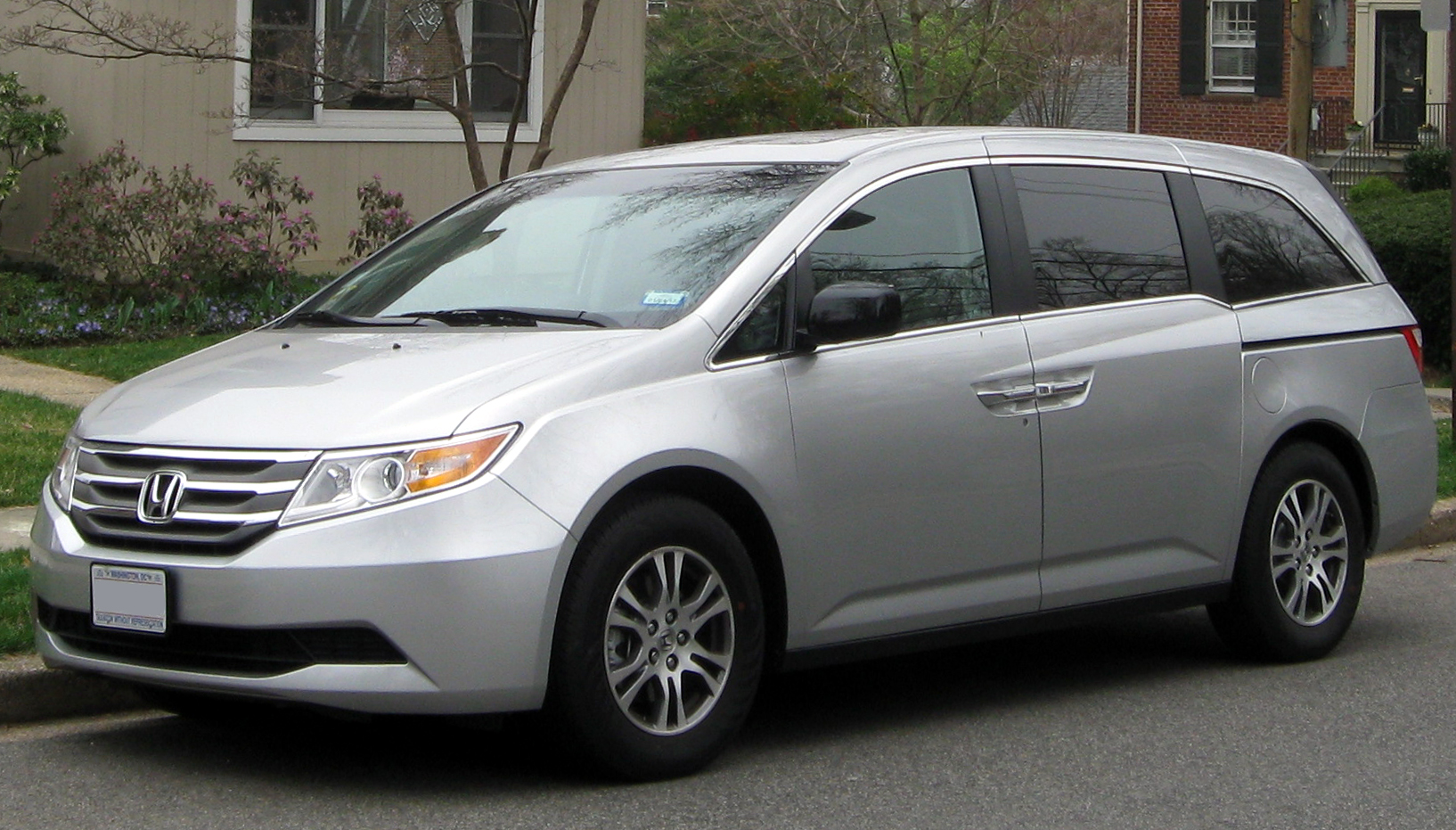

Overview
- Model code: RL5
- Production: May 2010 – 2017
- Model years: 2011–2017
- Assembly: United States: Lincoln, Alabama (HMA)
- Designer: Catalin Matei (2008)

Body and chassis
- Related: Honda Pilot; Acura MDX

Powertrain
- Engine: 3.5 L J35Z8 V6
- Transmission: 5-speed automatic (2011–13 except Touring models); 6-speed automatic (Touring models: 2011–13, all models: 2014–17)

Dimensions
- Wheelbase: 118.1 in (3,000 mm)
- Length: 202.9 in (5,154 mm)
- Width: 79.2 in (2,012 mm)
- Height: 68.4 in (1,737 mm)

Honda presented the 2011 Odyssey Concept in early 2010 at the Chicago Auto Show and officially released it for sale on June 17, 2010; with a larger, wider body, a lower roofline and revised styling.

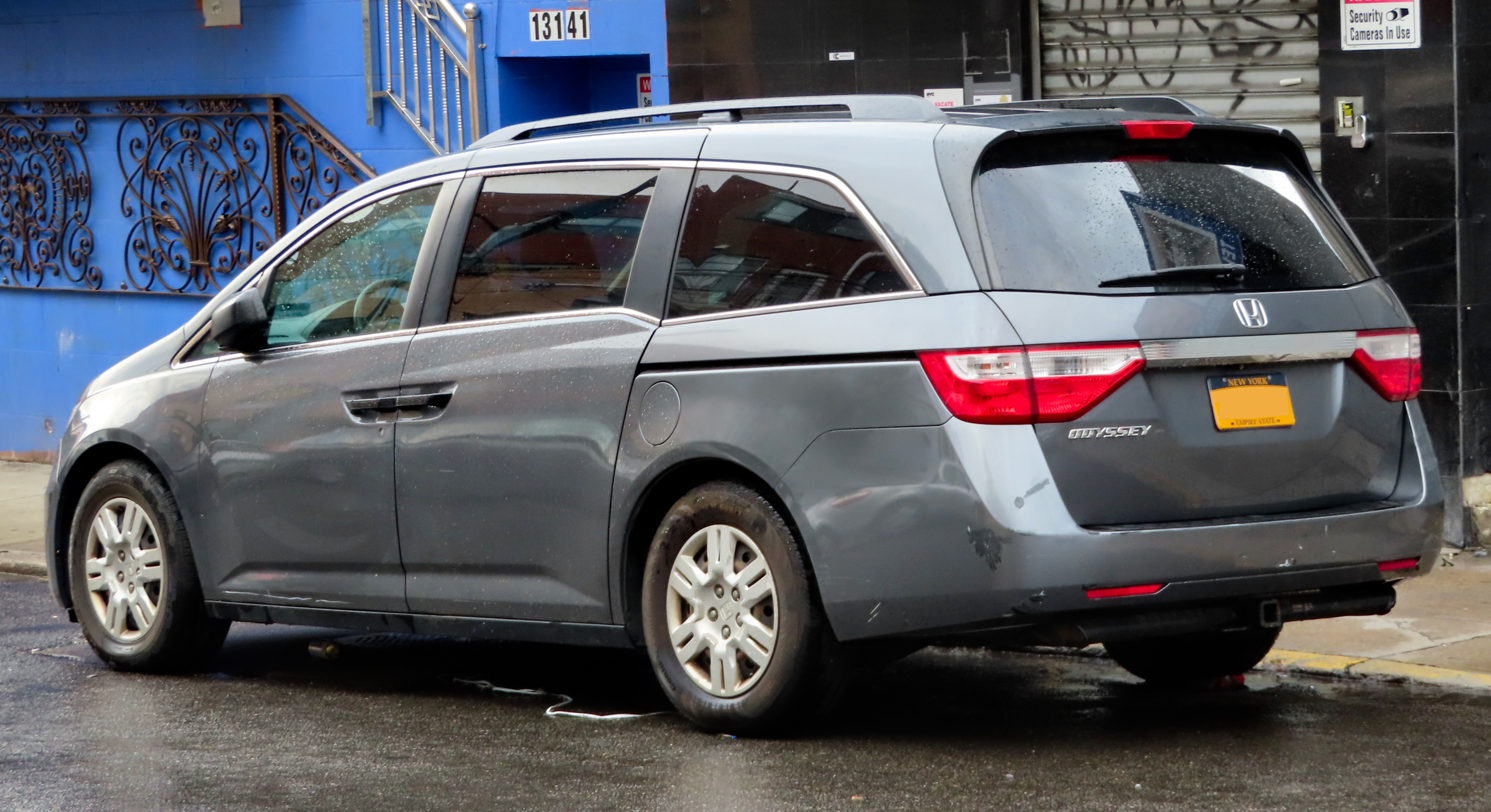
Pre-facelift Honda Odyssey LX

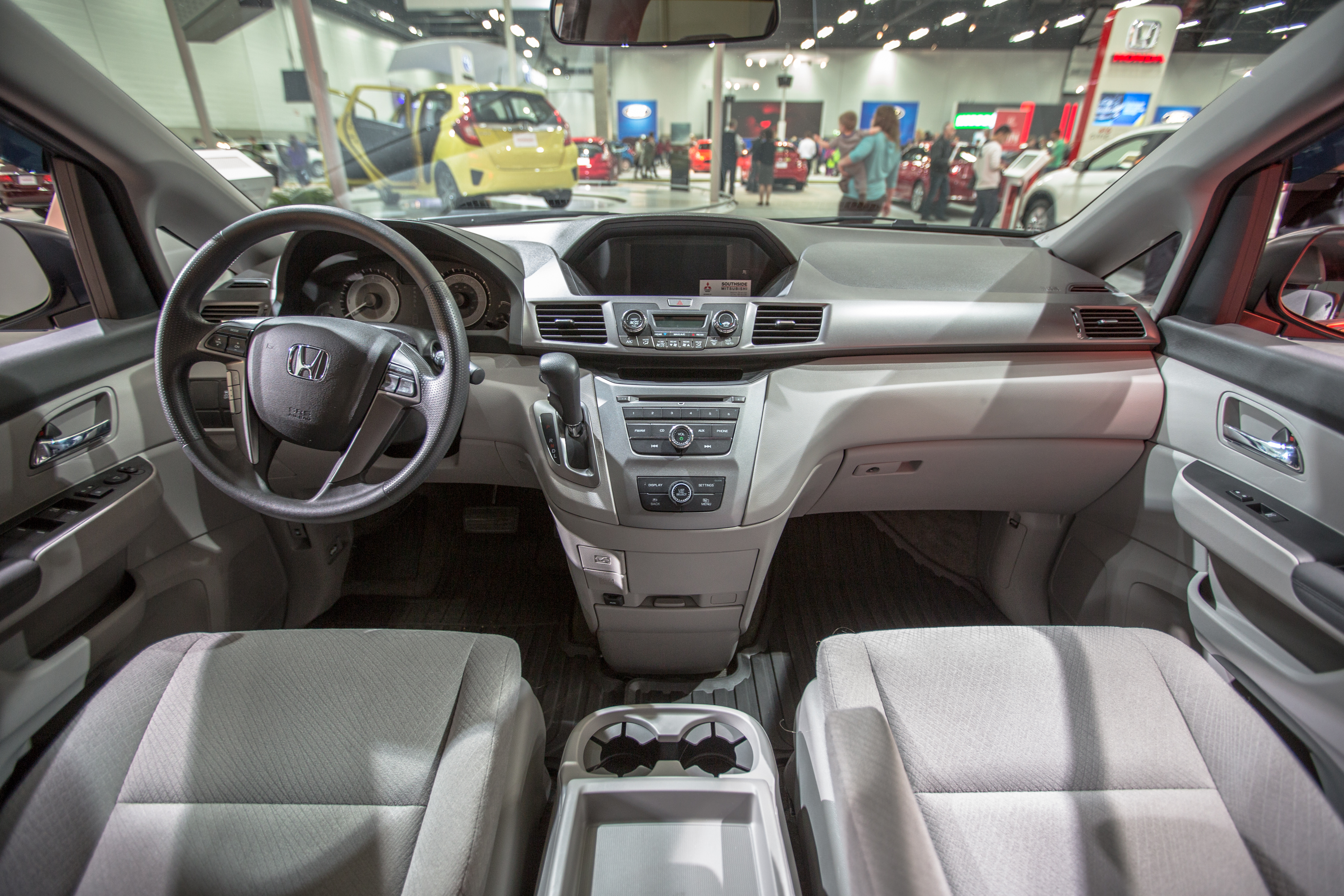
Interior (facelift)

Compared to its predecessor, the fourth generation Odyssey is 0.8 in (20 mm) longer, 2.1 in (53 mm) wider and 0.4–0.6 in (10–15 mm) lower. The body is constructed using 59% high strength steel, ranging from 390 to 1,500 MPa yield strength. Trim levels included the LX, EX, EX-L, Touring, and Touring Elite. The Touring Elite was the new top-of-the-line trim level, then simplified to just Elite for its fifth generation beginning with the 2018 model year.

The fourth generation Odyssey introduced options including a 650-watt premium audio system with 12 speakers and 5.1 surround sound theater mode paired with a new DVD Ultra-Wide Rear Entertainment System (UW-RES) with 16.2-inch display and HDMI port (Touring Elite), a voice-controlled satellite GPS and HDD navigation system with XM NavTraffic (Touring and above, available EX-L), a "cool box" chilled by the air conditioning (EX-L and above), a stowable 3rd row 60/40 split bench seat, a removable first row center console (EX and above), and a new steering wheel shared with the eighth-generation Accord.

The fourth generation Odyssey includes projector headlamps or HID xenon low-beam headlamps (Touring Elite), standard 17-inch wheels, 18-inch alloy wheels (Touring and above), and 6-speed automatic transmission (Touring and above). A Blind Spot Display for the driver's side and a multi-angle backup camera is available.

All Odyssey models have a 3.5 L J35Z8 V6 that makes 248 bhp (185 kW) at 5700 rpm and 250 lb⋅ft (339 N⋅m) of torque at 4800 rpm. Variable Cylinder Management (VCM) became standard on all models unlike its predecessor, which included VCM on EX-L and Touring models only. The version of VCM with 3-, 4-, and 6-cylinder modes that was introduced with the 2008 Odyssey continued to be used with the fourth generation Odyssey.

Bluetooth HandsFreeLink, previously only on Navigation models, was introduced to EX-L without Navigation. i-MID and Bluetooth HandsFreeLink was introduced for 2011 on EX-L w/o Navigation, 2012 on EX, and 2013 on LX. The backup camera was moved from the rearview mirror to the i-MID screen with the 2011 EX-L. The backup camera was also introduced on EX with 2012 (i-MID) and LX with 2013 (i-MID).

The trip computer (range, fuel MPG), previously exclusive on Touring's Programmable Multi-Information Display, was introduced to the single information display in the instrument cluster of LX, EX, and EX-L with this generation.

=== 2014 facelift ===
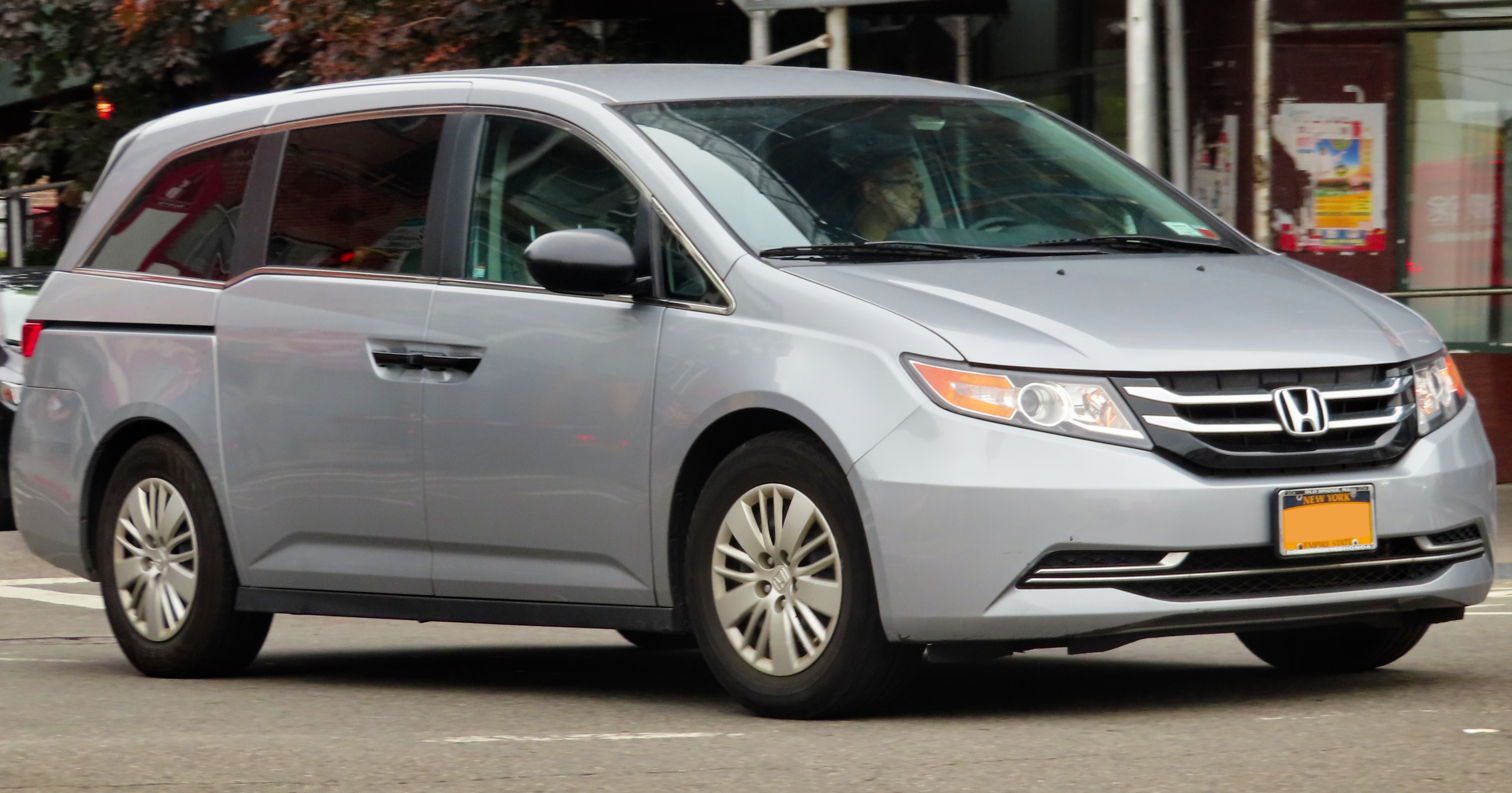
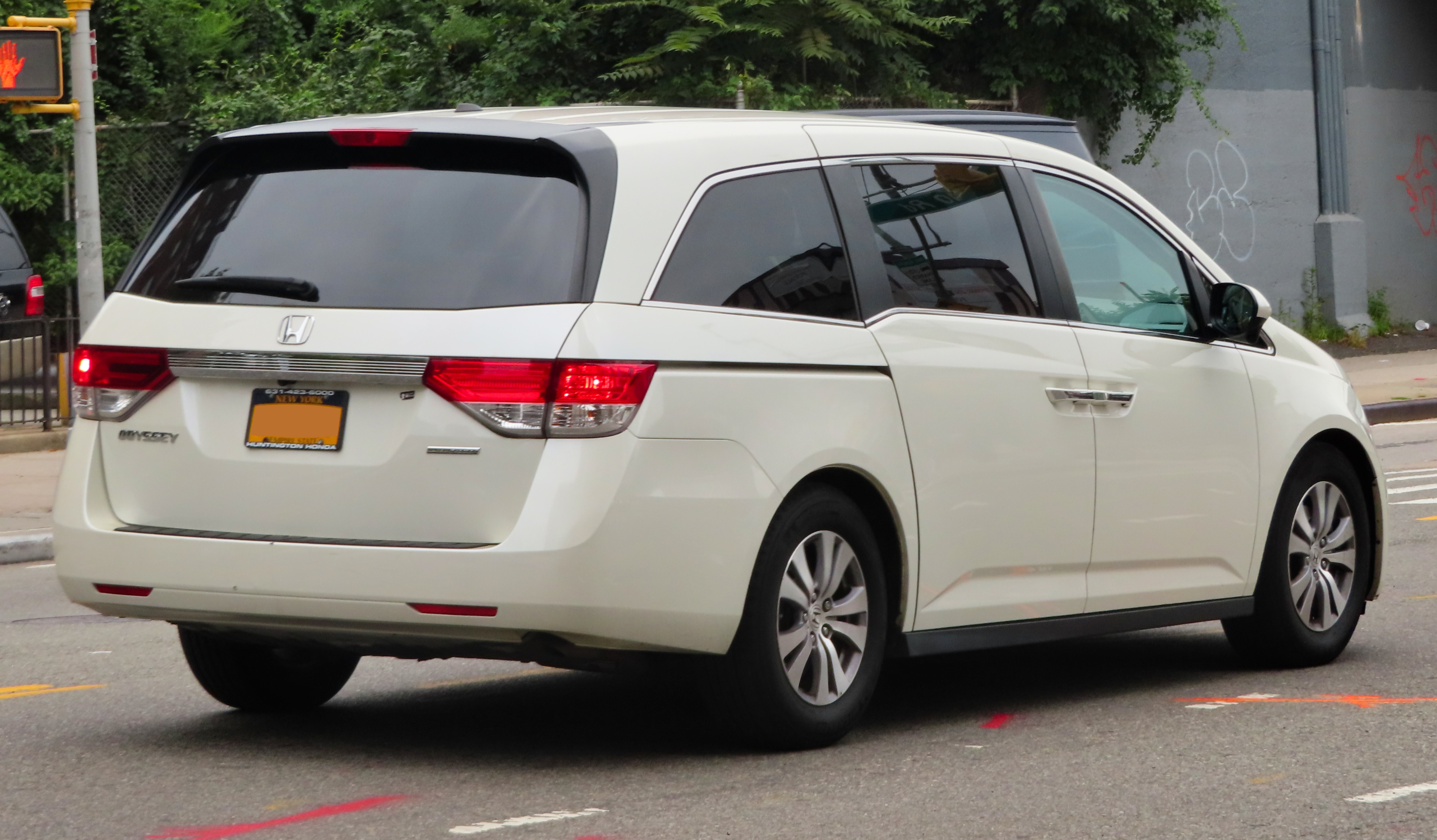
Facelifted Honda Odyssey LX and SE

The 2014 model year Odyssey received a facelift and went on sale on July 2, 2013. Changes included the previously Touring-exclusive 6-speed automatic transmission becoming standard on all trims. The revised suspension uses aluminum front lower control arms, sleeker exterior styling with a new aluminum hood, aluminum front fenders, twin-bar grille and revised lower front fascia with optional integrated fog lights, darker-finish projector headlight housings, Smart Entry with Push Button Start availability (standard on EX and above) and LED rear tail light bars. A built-in vacuum cleaner system is included with the Touring Elite model, which receives special "Elite" badging to distinguish it from the non-Elite Touring models.

Honda's i-MID, also available on the Civic and Accord, became standard equipment in 2014 models (previously only on non-navigation models); all models became standard Pandora Internet Radio capabilities, Bluetooth Hands-Free Link, iPod, iPhone, USB integration and a color display screen.

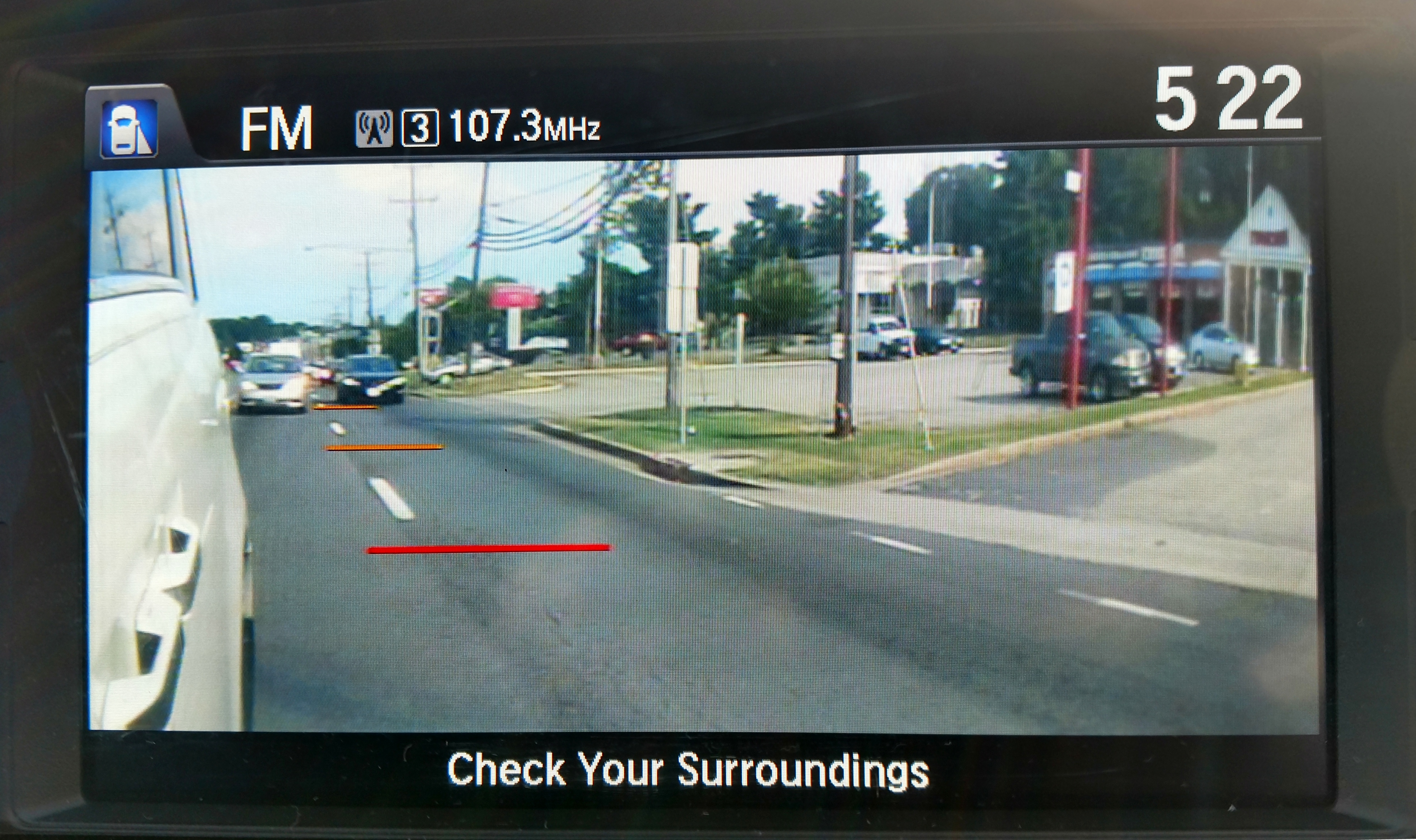
LaneWatch provides an 80° field of view along the passenger-side of the vehicle giving four-times more visibility than traditional side-view mirrors.

New safety features included in the refresh include a LaneWatch camera housed in the passenger side-view mirror or a Blind Spot Monitoring system. Forward Collision Warning (FCW) and Lane Departure Warning (LDW) are also available while a single-angle backup camera with dynamic guidelines became standard equipment.

The SE trim positioned between EX and EX-L, was initially limited to the Canadian market but was made available in the US by the 2016 model year. New exterior paint colors were made available in 2014, as are new interior fabrics and trim pieces.

=== Safety ===
The Insurance Institute for Highway Safety (IIHS) found the Odyssey to have the lowest overall driver death rate in its class with 0 deaths per million registered years. Beginning with the 2013 model year, all Odysseys came equipped with a rear-view backup camera. For 2014, the front crash structure was upgraded.

==== IIHS ====
IIHS:
Moderate overlap frontal offset	Good
Small overlap frontal offset (2014–17)	Good^{*}
Side impact	Good
Roof strength	Good

^{*} first minivan to earn IIHS Top Safety Pick+ award

==== NHTSA ====
2011 Odyssey FWD NHTSA
Overall:	5/5 stars
Frontal Driver:	5/5 stars
Frontal Passenger:	5/5 stars
Side Driver:	5/5 stars
Side Passenger:	5/5 stars
Side Pole Driver:	5/5 stars
Rollover:	/ 12.7%

== Fifth generation (RL6; 2018) ==
Fifth generation (North America)
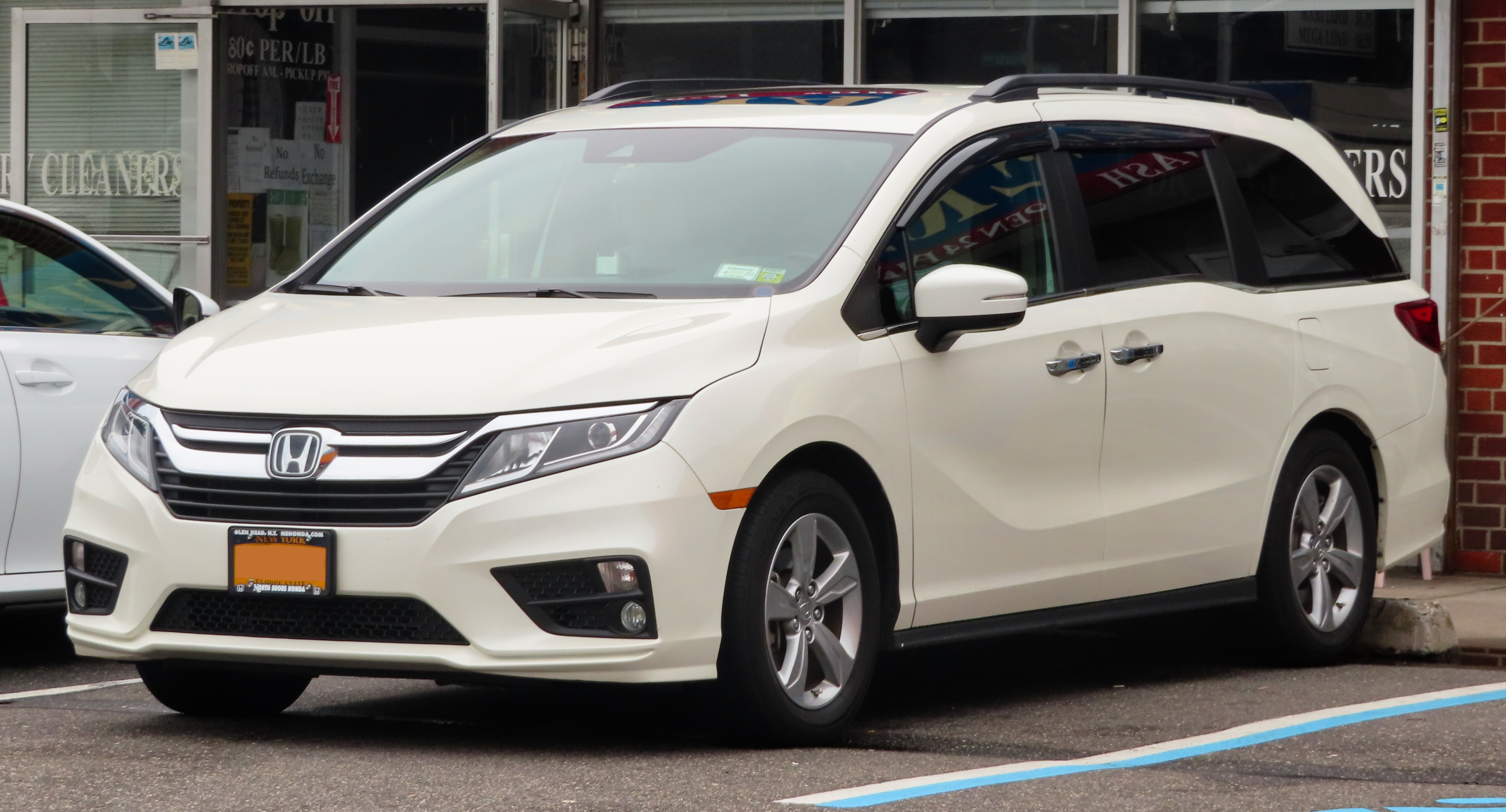
- 2018 Honda Odyssey EX-L

Overview
- Model code: RL6
- Production: April 2017–present
- Model years: 2018–present
- Assembly: United States: Lincoln, Alabama (HMA)
- Designer: Randall Smock (2015)

Powertrain
- Engine: 3.5 L J35Y6 V6
- Transmission: 9-speed ZF 9HP automatic (2018–19 non-Touring and Elite models); 10-speed automatic (Touring and Elite models: 2018–19, standard: 2020–)

Dimensions
- Wheelbase: 118.1 in (3,000 mm)
- Length: 203.2 in (5,161 mm)
- Width: 78.5 in (1,994 mm)
- Height: 69.5 in (1,765 mm)
- Curb weight: 4,354–4,593 lb (1,975–2,083 kg)

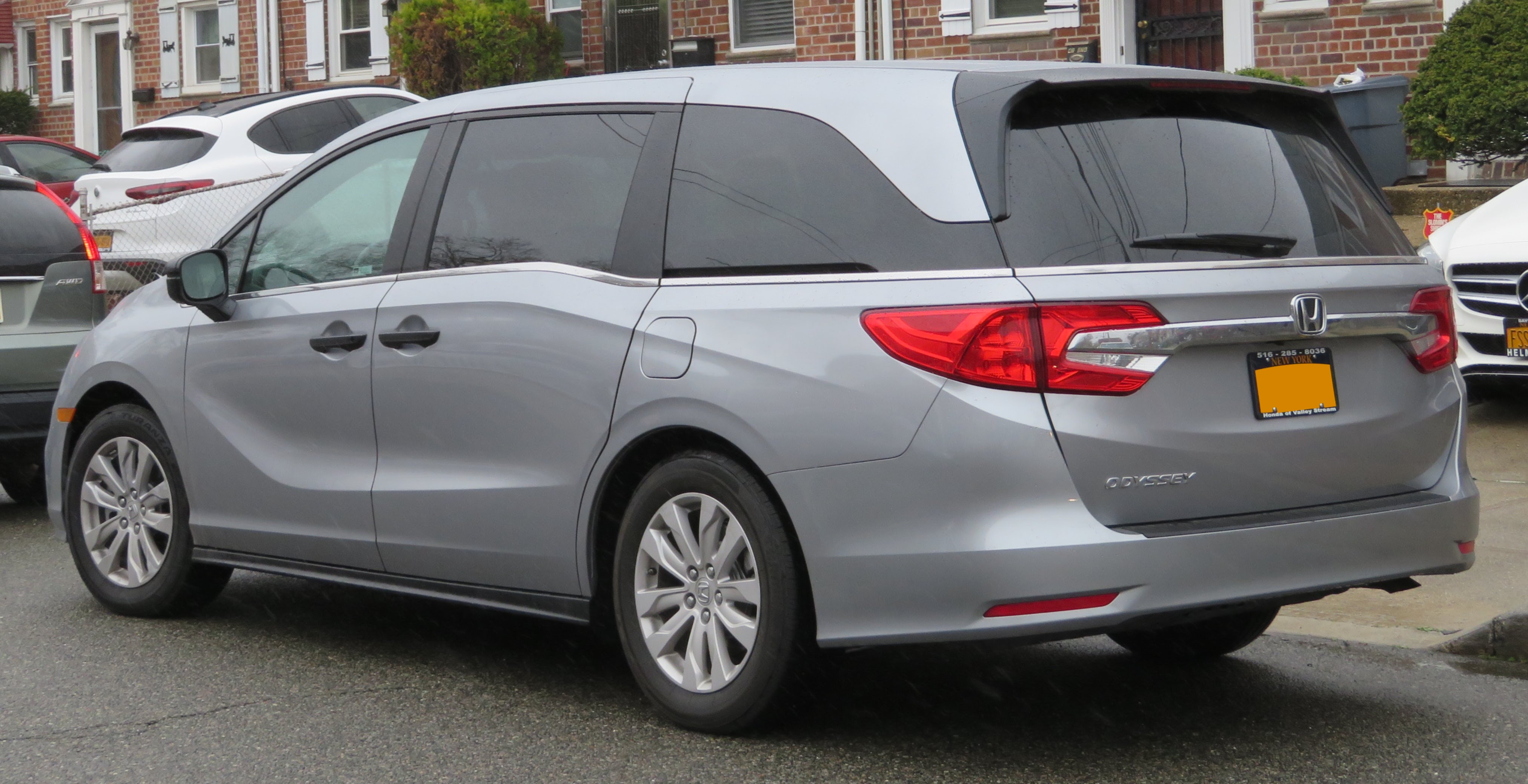
2018 Honda Odyssey LX rear view

The fifth generation Odyssey was unveiled at the 2017 North American International Auto Show in January. Honda Manufacturing of Alabama (HMA) began production on April 26, and sales followed on May 25, 2017 as a 2018 model. A new Honda-developed 10-speed automatic transmission produced at Honda Precision Parts Georgia (HPPG) is Honda's first use of a 10-speed transmission in a production automobile, and reportedly the first 10-speed transmission used in a front-wheel-drive vehicle. It is nearly 29 lb (13 kg) lighter than the previous 6-speed. Trim levels included LX, EX, EX-L, Touring, and Elite.

Compared to its predecessor, the fifth generation is 0.7 in (18 mm) narrower, 1.2 in (30 mm) taller and shares the same 118.1 in (3 m) wheelbase. It also utilizes the latest generation of Honda's Advanced Compatibility Engineering (ACE) body structure which is constructed using advanced materials including ultra-high-strength steel, aluminum and magnesium that minimizes weight to up to 75 lb (34 kg) and improve torsional body rigidity up to 44% from the previous generation. The use of structural body adhesives has increased compared to the 4th gen with 145 ft (44 m) used. High-strength steel comprises 55% of the body. Like the Acura MDX and Pilot, the redesigned Odyssey features a 1500 MPa hot stamped outer front door stiffener ring and forged aluminum front suspension lower control arms. As well as a new dual-pinion electric power steering system and a new rear suspension with stabilizer bar.

For the 2018 model year, the EX trim and above feature the Honda Sensing suite of advanced safety and driver-assistive technologies as standard equipment. Which includes Collision Mitigation Braking System (CMBS), Lane Keeping Assist (LKAS), Road Departure Mitigation (RDM) and Adaptive Cruise Control (ACC). The LaneWatch camera housed in the passenger side-view mirror is replaced for by a Blind Spot Information System (BSI) with Cross Traffic Monitor.

The traditional mechanical gear was replaced with a shift-by-wire push button electronic selector gear on all models. Push button start, previously included only on Smart Entry models (EX and above), is now included on LX due to the Shift-by-Wire technology.

The EX trim and above feature new Magic Slide second-row seats, which can slide sideways and can be removed with ease.

The screens for Honda's navigation system and audio controls have been merged into a single 8-inch Display Audio touchscreen system with CarPlay and Android Auto, as well as CabinControl remote compatibility. Touring and Elite models include CabinWatch day/night video monitor, CabinTalk in-car PA system, 4G LTE in-car Wi-Fi hotspot, a 10.2-inch Rear Entertainment System (RES) with Blu-ray and streaming video, hands-free power tailgate, heated steering wheel, LED accent lighting.

All Odyssey models come with a revised 3.5 L direct injected J35Y6 SOHC V6 engine that makes 280 hp (209 kW) at 6,000 rpm and 262 lb⋅ft (355 N⋅m) of torque at 4,700 rpm. This engine returned to using a version of Variable Cylinder Management (VCM) that only has a 3 cylinder and 6 cylinder mode as opposed to the 3-, 4-, and 6-cylinder modes found on models from 2008–2017, which improved EPA fuel economy ratings of 19/28/22 mpg city/highway/combined. Like its predecessors, this engine uses a timing belt with scheduled replacement required every 100,000 miles.

Beginning for the 2020 model year, all models come equipped with Honda's developed 10-speed automatic transmission, as the ZF 9HP transmission was discontinued.

=== 2021 facelift ===
In March 2020, for the 2021 model year, the Odyssey features a minor restyling that includes a redesigned front grille and tailgate trim and adds 4-way power lumbar adjustability to the front passenger seat alongside perforated leather with contrasting piping options. Honda Sensing became standard on all trims. A rear seat occupant reminder is added to the CabinWatch system to help prevent heatstroke among children.

The Navigation and Rear Entertainment System option was removed from the EX-L.

Headlight improvements for the following year's model makes the 2022 Odyssey an IIHS Top Safety Pick+.

For the 2023 model year, the base LX trim is discontinued, and a new Sport trim is placed between EX-L and Touring which features a sport-styled interior and exterior. The Canada and Mexico markets introduce a new Top-of-the-Line Black Edition which features black trim throughout the vehicle, gloss black side mirrors, a black grille, and darkened LED taillights, black aluminum wheels, gloss black side skirts and a trunk spoiler. The steering wheel and upholstery are black leather with red stitching and inserts on the first and second row seatbacks, as well as red ambient lighting. It is also the first Odyssey to include body-colored door handles, on the Sport trim, since the third generation Odyssey (2005-2010).

In the IIHS' updated Moderate Overlap test, which emphasizes rear occupant safety, the 2023 Odyssey received a Poor rating. It is the only minivan to receive a Poor rating in the updated test.

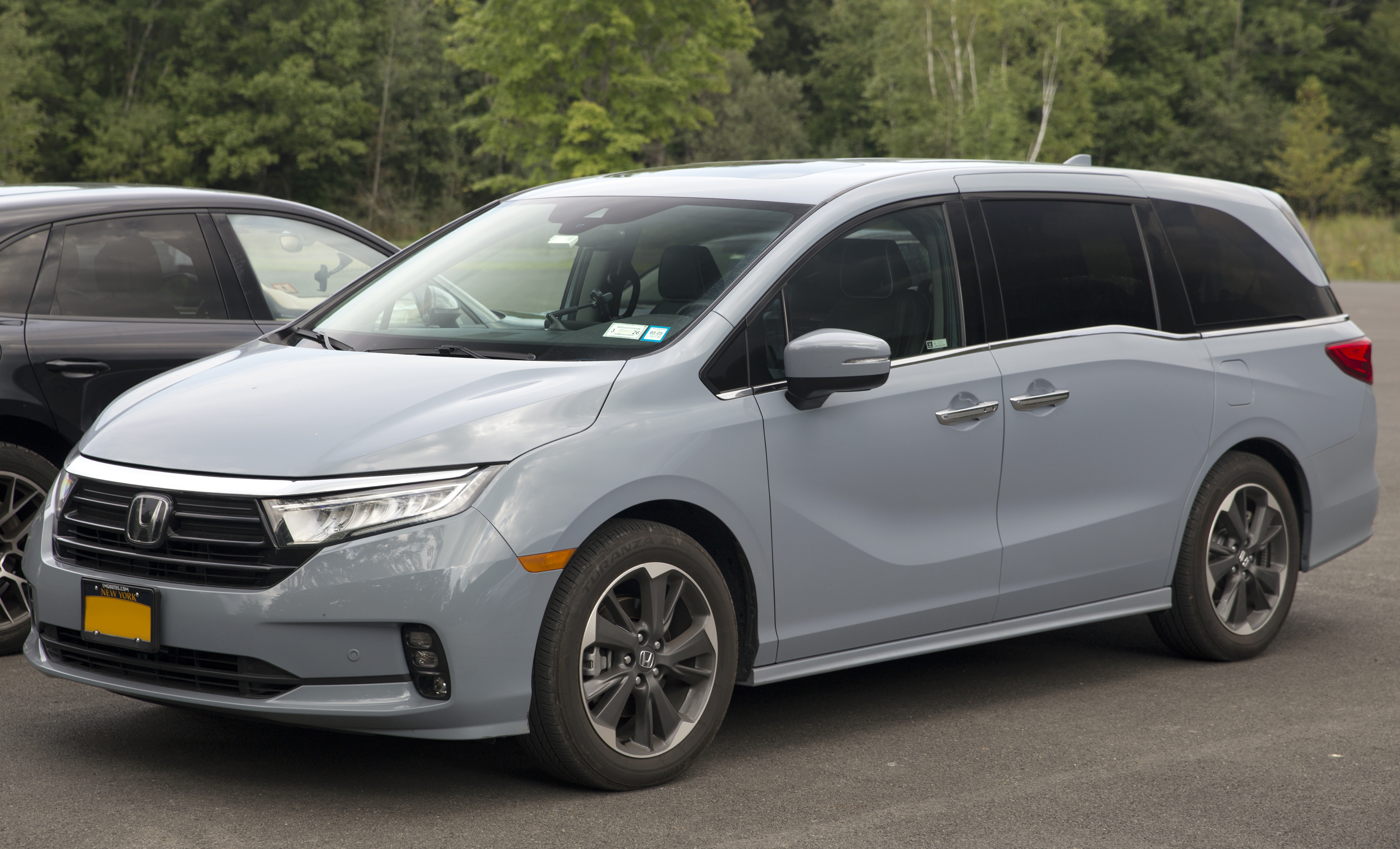
2024 Honda Odyssey Elite (facelift)

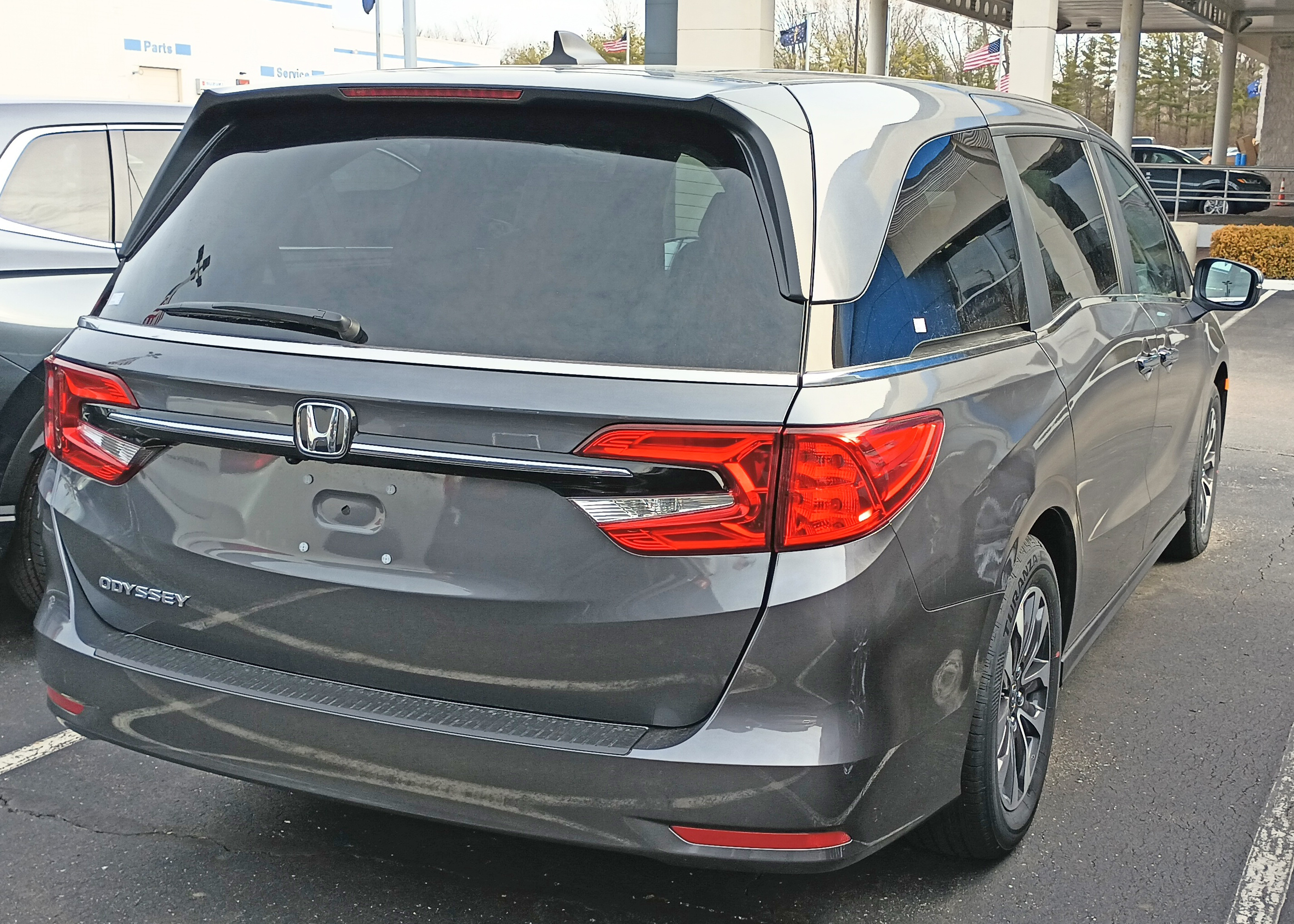
Facelift, rear view (2023)

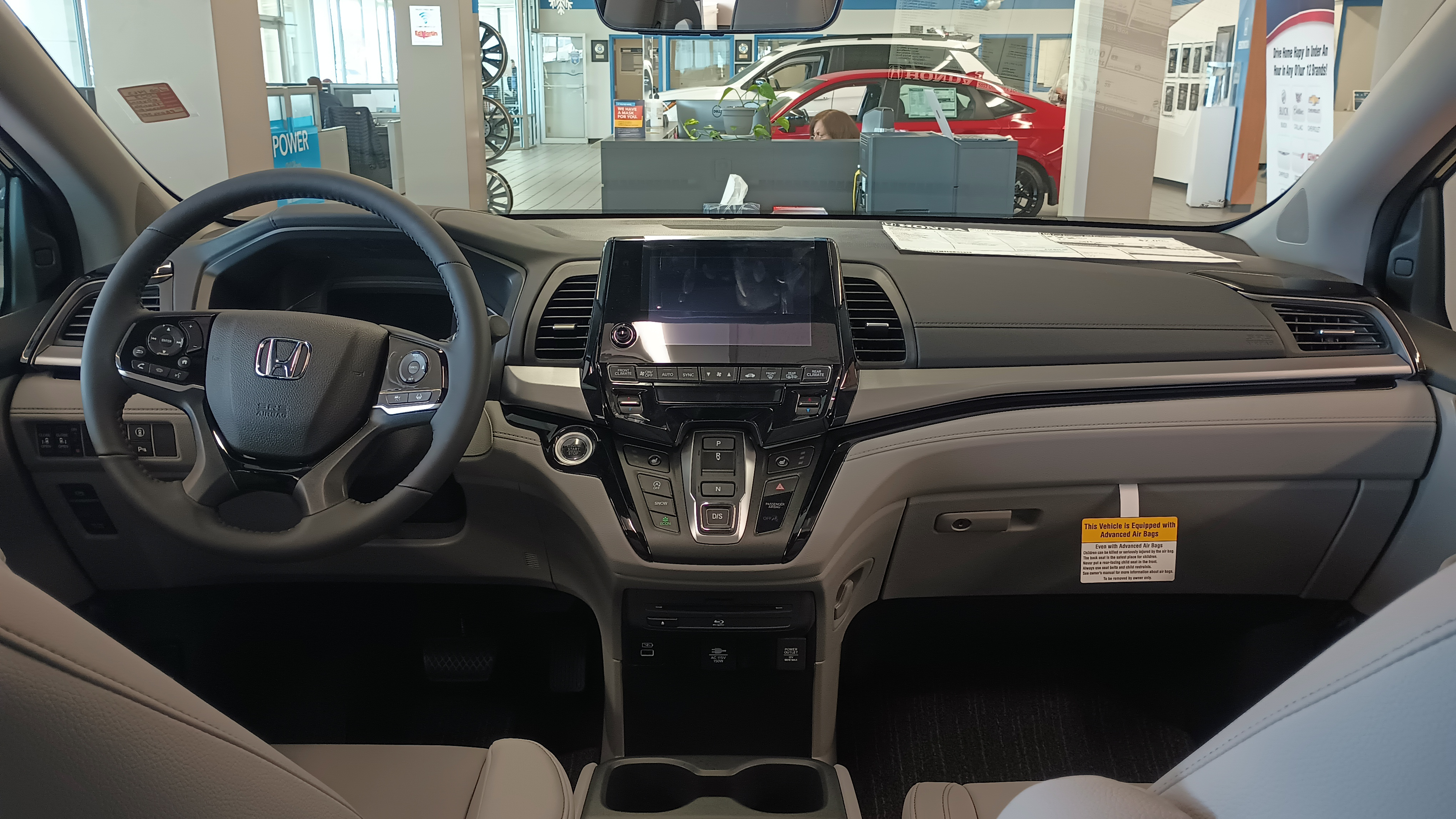
Interior

=== 2025 facelift ===
In July 2024, for the 2025 model year, the EX trim was discontinued, leaving the EX-L as the base model, along with the Sport (which is renamed Sport-L), Touring, and Elite trims. The exterior features a sporty new grille, and reshaped front and rear fascias. The front fascia features larger black fog light surrounds and the redesigned rear bumper integrates the same vertical reflectors used on the second-generation Acura NSX supercar.

Inside, all models received a new 7-inch digital instrument display, featuring an all-digital tachometer on the left and a physical speedometer on the right. A larger 9-inch Display Audio touchscreen with a faster processor, wireless Apple CarPlay and Android Auto compatibility, a wireless phone charger, and more USB-C ports are added throughout the cabin.

The Rear Entertainment System has been updated with a larger 12.8-inch high-resolution screen. The HDMI port has been relocated to the inside of the console, which offers a dedicated storage compartment for streaming devices. The Blu-ray/DVD player has been discontinued.

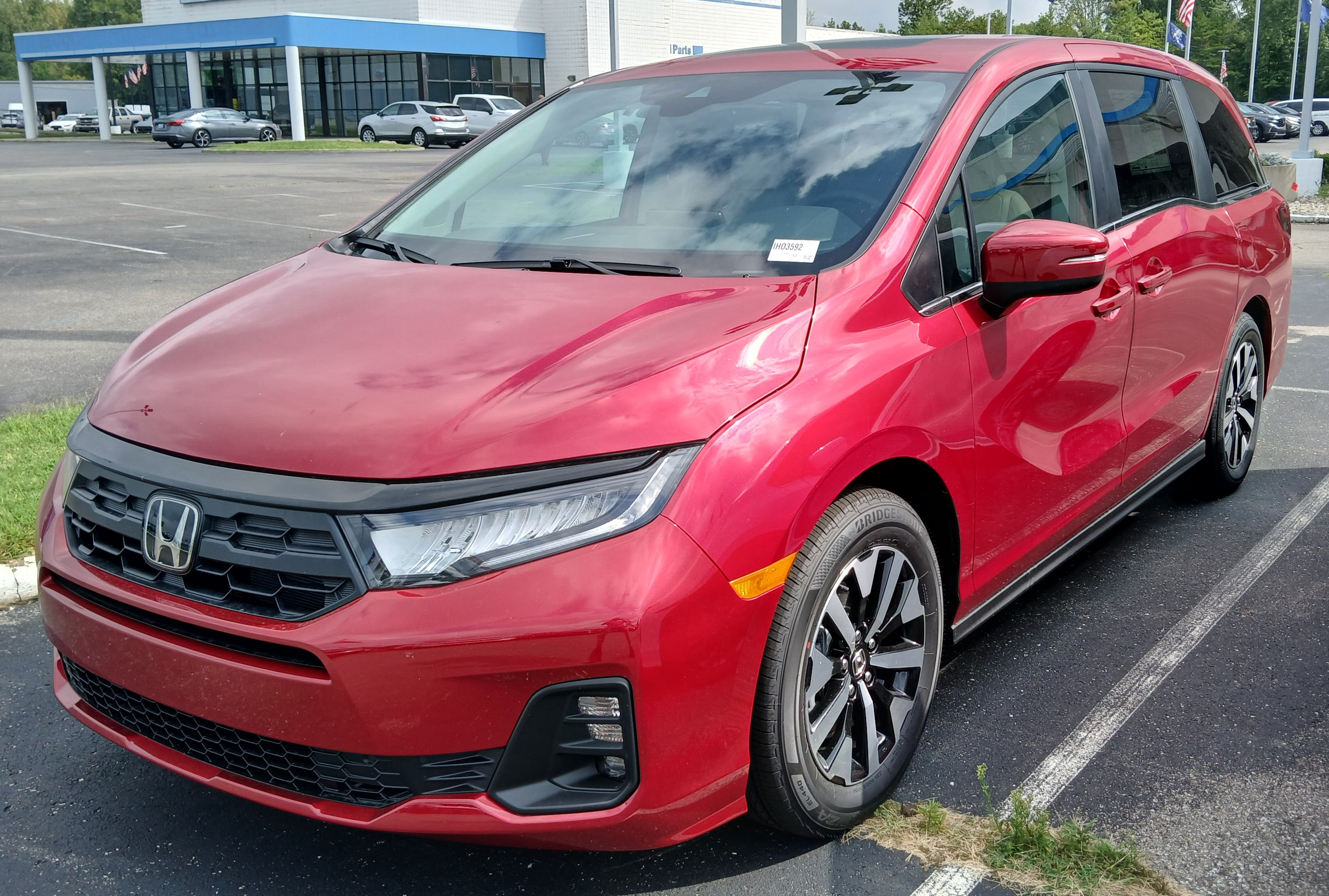
2025 Odyssey front (second facelift)

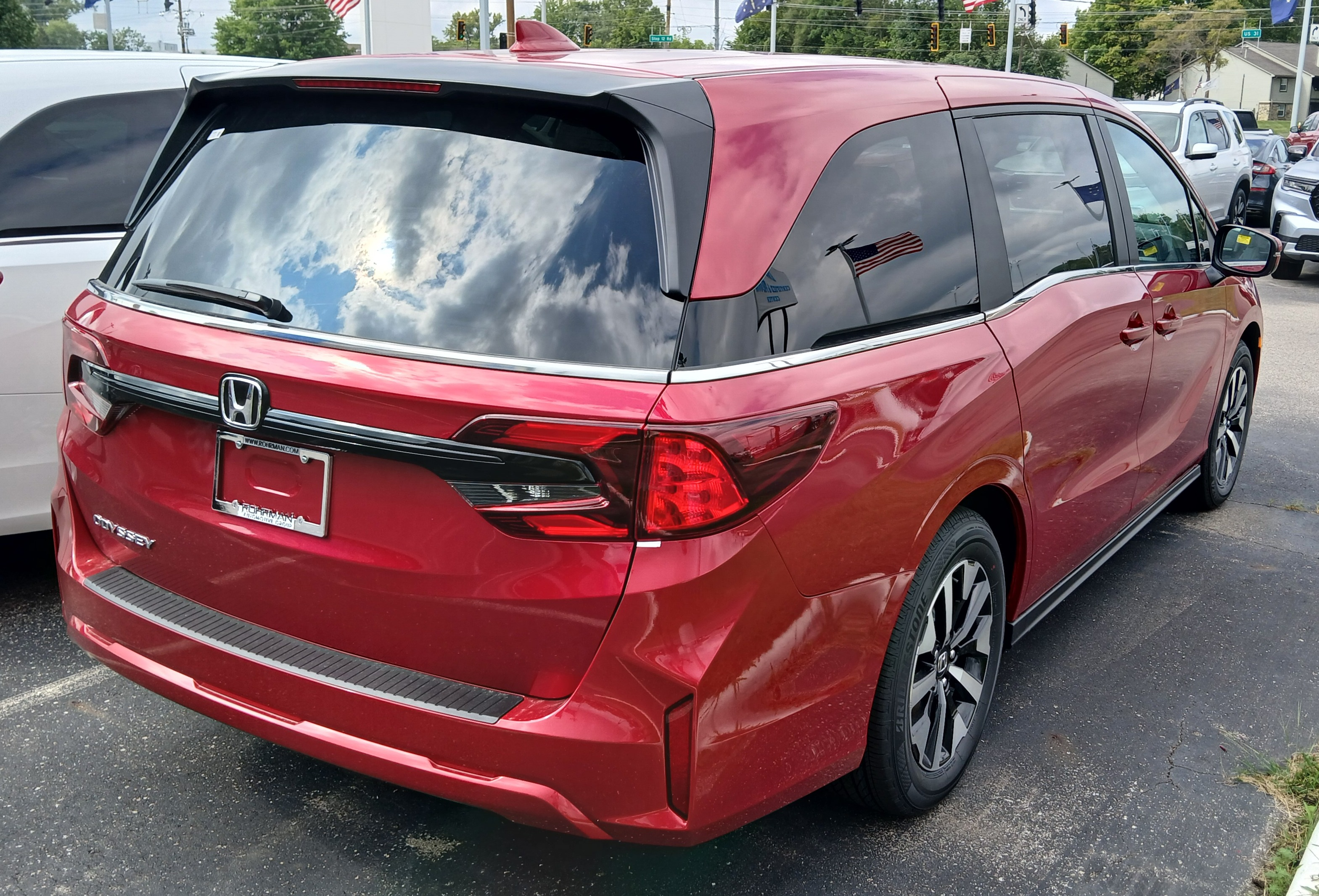
2025 Odyssey rear (second facelift)

=== Safety ===
The 2018 model year Odyssey received a "Top Safety Pick+" award by the IIHS.

IIHS scores
Test	Rating		
Small overlap front (driver side)	Good		
Small overlap front (passenger side)	Good		
Moderate overlap front (original test)	Good		
Side (original test)	Good		
Side (updated test)	Good		
Roof strength	Good		
Head restraints and seats	Good		
Headlights	Acceptable	Marginal	Poor
Front crash prevention: vehicle-to-vehicle (2018–2020 models with optional equipment)	Superior		
Child seat anchors (LATCH) ease of use	Good+		

== Reception ==
At its debut, the Odyssey won the Japan Car of the Year Award (Special Category) and the RJC New Car of the Year Award. By September 1997, the Odyssey had sold more than 300,000 units, becoming Honda's fastest-selling new car and breaking the Civic's record. The Odyssey was Wheels magazine's Car of the Year for 1995. At the Odyssey's European launch, where it was marketed as the Shuttle, British ex-Grand Prix driver Jonathan Palmer described its handling as equal of any "executive sedan". Subsequent generations of the Odyssey have given the nameplate a reputation "as the most car-like minivan available".

In a 1995 owner survey, 98% of the respondents rated the Odyssey's handling as above average, 50.3 percent rating engine power to be good — and 25 percent wanted a more powerful engine. A later review of the first generation Odyssey summarized the minivan's market reception:

The Odyssey was misplaced in the minivan market, which favors a huge, comfortable amount of interior space and versatility.

== Awards and recognition ==
The Odyssey has received numerous awards since its inception, winning both Car and Driver's "5 Best Trucks" and Consumer Reports' "Top Pick Minivan" several times.

== Export vehicle ==
In the middle of 2012, Honda began exporting the fourth generation North American Odyssey minivan to the Philippines. Export of the Odyssey to that market ceased in 2015 after the introduction of the international fifth generation Odyssey which is imported from Japan.

A version of the second generation North American Odyssey was sold in Japan as the Honda LaGreat.

The Odyssey manufactured at HMA in Alabama has also been exported to Canada, Mexico, South America, South Korea, and the Middle East.

== Sales ==
Calendar year	US	Canada	Mexico
1994	230		
1995	25,911		
1996	27,025		
1997	20,333		
1998	20,819		
1999	77,801		
2000	126,705		
2001	131,041		3,018
2002	153,467		2,674
2003	154,063		2,089
2004	154,238		1,921
2005	174,275	12,573	4,360
2006	177,919	13,368	5,414
2007	173,046	12,025	4,391
2008	135,493	10,123	4,264
2009	100,133	6,449	2,457
2010	108,182	8,616	3,029
2011	107,068	9,060	5,410
2012	125,980	9,094	5,207
2013	128,987	10,248	4,787
2014	122,738	11,480	4,741
2015	127,736	11,272	3,739
2016	120,846	12,311	2,494
2017	100,307	11,232	2,725
2018	106,327	11,546	2,700
2019	99,113	9,257	2,313
2020	83,409	5,361	1,073
2021	76,125	4,126	1,172
2022	47,615	2,809	876
2023	74,738	4,274	1,784
2024	80,293		1,682
2025	88,462		1,362

=== Chassis Codes ===
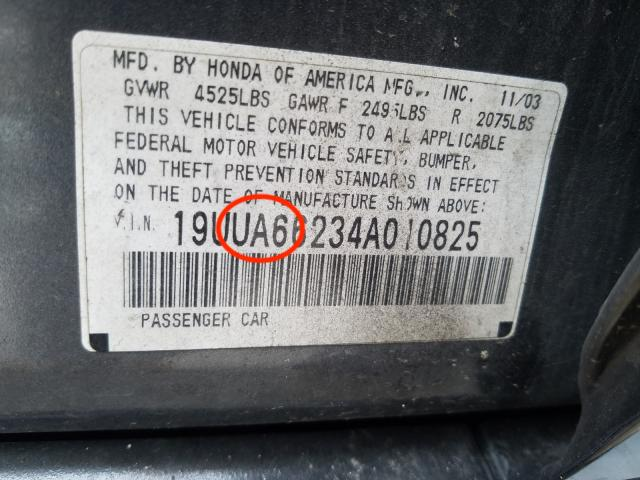

Chassis code are linked with the vehicle's identification number (VIN). The number after the letters RA/RL indicates the type and generation code:

- RA1 = 2.2 F22B6 FWD Odyssey (1995 – 1998)
- RA2 = 2.2 F22B6 4WD Odyssey (1995 – 1998) (Not available in North America)
- RA3 = 2.3 F23B7 FWD Odyssey (1998)
- RA4 = 2.3 F23B7 4WD Odyssey (1998) (Not available in North America)
- RA5 = 3.0 J30A3 Odyssey (1997 – 1998) (Not available in North America)
- RL1 = 3.5 J35A1/4 Odyssey (1999 – 2004)
- RL3 = 3.5 J35A6 Odyssey (LX, EX) (2005 – 2010)
- RL4 = 3.5 J35A7 Odyssey (EX-L, Touring) (2005 – 2010)
- RL5 = 3.5 J35Z8 Odyssey (2011 – 2017)
- RL6 = 3.5 J35Y7 Odyssey (2018 – present)
