= Subaru of Indiana Automotive =

Automobile assembly plant in Lafayette, Indiana

Coordinates: 40.38°N 86.80°W

Subaru of Indiana Automotive, Inc.
- Formerly: Subaru-Isuzu Automotive
- Type: Subsidiary
- Industry: Automotive
- Founded: 1987; 39 years ago
- Headquarters: Lafayette, Indiana, US
- Key people: Fumiaki Hayata (Chairman and CEO)
- Products: Automobiles
- Owner: Subaru Corporation
- Number of employees: 5,900 (2020)
- Website: subaru-sia.com

Location in the United States
Location in Indiana

Subaru of Indiana Automotive, Inc. (often abbreviated as SIA) is an automobile assembly plant in Lafayette, Indiana, United States, which began as "Subaru-Isuzu Automotive, Inc.", a joint venture between Subaru Corporation and Isuzu Motors Ltd. Today, the plant is a wholly owned subsidiary of Subaru Corporation which produces the Ascent, Crosstrek and Forester models. As Subaru's only manufacturing facility outside of Asia, SIA produces about half of all Subaru vehicles sold in North America.

== History ==
Subaru, then known as Fuji Heavy Industries (FHI), and Isuzu signed a joint venture agreement on May 29, 1986, to form Subaru-Isuzu Automotive and to share production facilities at a new plant in Lafayette, Indiana, between Indianapolis and Chicago. The plant was completed in late 1988 and officially began producing the Subaru Legacy and Isuzu Pickup on September 11, 1989. While only about 500 cars were finished in the first full month of production, the plant's annual capacity was 240,000 vehicles.

The Indiana state government gave Subaru-Isuzu US$86 million in incentives to locate in the state, after having lost the Diamond-Star manufacturing plant to neighboring Illinois. Subaru also planned to export about 1,000 Indiana-built Legacys per year to Taiwan.

After Isuzu sales significantly dwindled, Subaru dissolved their joint agreement. On January 1, 2003, Subaru purchased Isuzu's interest in the venture for one dollar and renamed the facility "Subaru of Indiana Automotive." In addition to producing Subaru vehicles, the company continued to produce the Isuzu Rodeo and Honda Passport badge-engineered twins, as well as the Isuzu Amigo and Axiom through July 23, 2004. Next, under a contract with Toyota, SIA built the Camry from February 28, 2007, until May 27, 2016, when additional space was needed for increased Subaru production.

Over the course of its history, SIA has been recognized for a variety of achievements related to safety, quality and the environment. The company is most recognized for becoming the first auto manufacturer in the United States to achieve zero-landfill status on May 4, 2004. In 2019, SIA celebrated multiple milestones, including its 4 millionth Subaru, 10 years as a zero-landfill facility, 30 years of production, and its 6 millionth vehicle overall.

As the popularity of Subaru vehicles has increased in the United States, the plant's production volume has increased as well. For the 2020-21 fiscal year, SIA expected production to increase to 410,000 vehicles.

Free guided tours are typically offered on Mondays and Wednesdays, except during its summer and winter shutdowns.

== Current manufacture at SIA ==
- Subaru Ascent/Evoltis (May 7, 2018 – present)
- Subaru Crosstrek (May 17, 2023 – present)
- Subaru Forester (October 2025 – present)

== Past manufacture at SIA ==
- Isuzu Pickup (September 11, 1989 – 1995)
- Subaru Legacy (September 11, 1989 – September 12, 2025)
- Isuzu Rodeo (May 15, 1990; July 21, 1997 – July 23, 2004)
- Honda Passport (November 16, 1993; July 21, 1997 – 2002)
- Isuzu Amigo (January 8, 1998 – July 23, 2004)
- Subaru Outback (May 17, 1999 – circa October 2025)
- Isuzu Axiom (January 15, 2001 – July 23, 2004)
- Subaru Baja (July 18, 2002 – 2006)
- Subaru Tribeca (April 4, 2005 – January 2014)
- Toyota Camry (February 28, 2007 – May 27, 2016)
- Subaru Impreza (November 1, 2016 – May 2023)
