= Isuzu V engine =

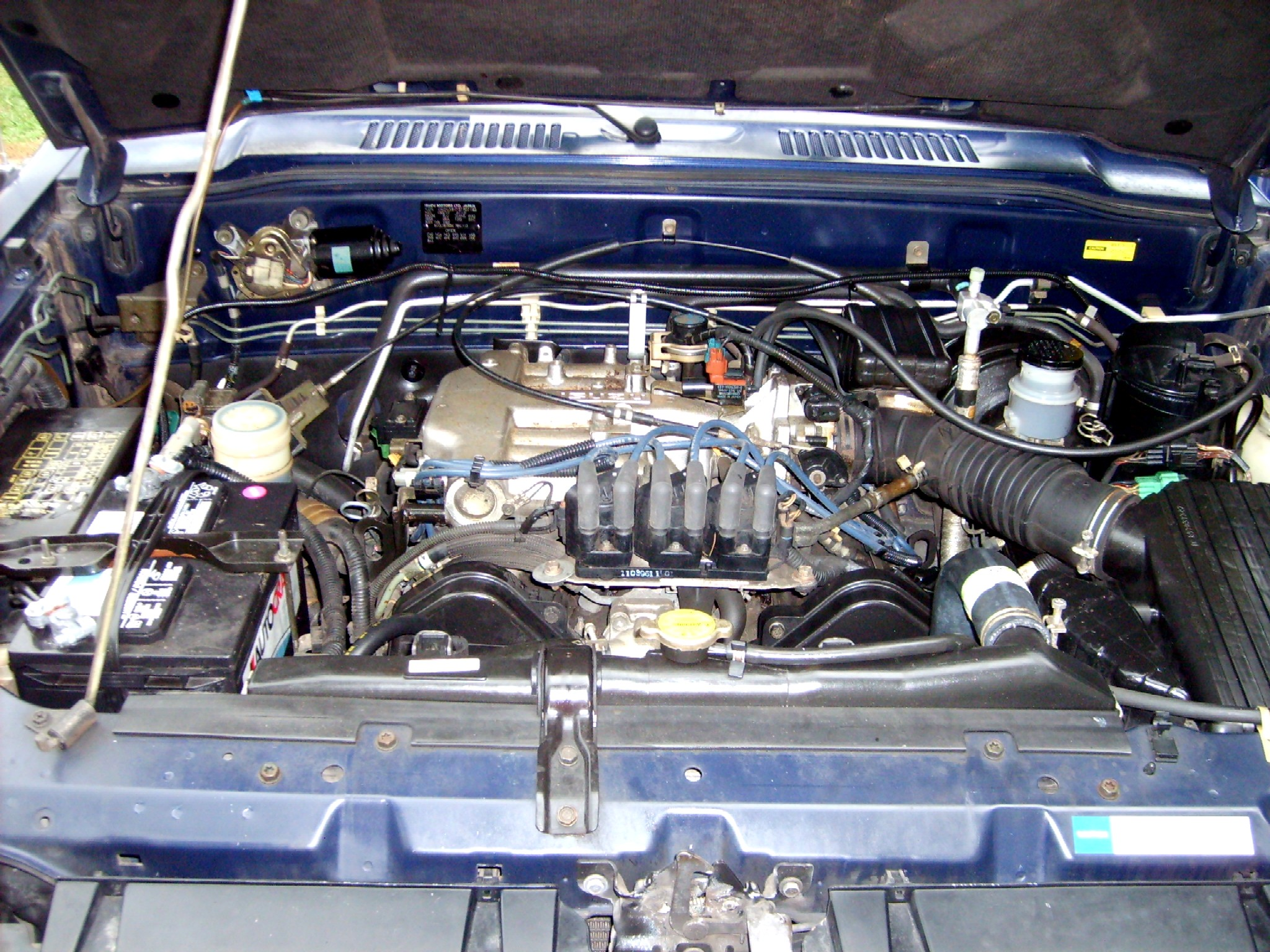
- Isuzu 6VD1 SOHC Engine

Overview
- Manufacturer: Isuzu
- Production: 1992-2004

Layout
- Configuration: 75° V6
- Displacement: 3.2 L 3.5 L
- Cylinder bore: 93.4 mm (3.68 in)
- Piston stroke: 77.0 mm (3.03 in); 85.0 mm (3.35 in)
- Cylinder block material: Aluminum
- Cylinder head material: Aluminum
- Valvetrain: SOHC; DOHC

Combustion
- Fuel system: Multi-port fuel injection; Gasoline direct injection
- Fuel type: Gasoline
- Oil system: Wet sump
- Cooling system: Water-cooled

Chronology
- Predecessor: General Motors LG6 engine
- Successor: General Motors LL8 engine

The Isuzu V engine is a family of all-aluminum 75° V6 gasoline engines produced by Isuzu. They feature either a belt-driven SOHC or DOHC valvetrain. Later versions feature direct ignition as well as gasoline direct injection. These engines are notable for their early adoption of gasoline direct injection technology and also for their uncommon 75° cylinder head bank angle.

== 6VD1 ==
The first generation of 6VD1 3.2 L SOHC and 6VD1-W DOHC V6 engines were used from 1992 to 1995. The original SOHC 6VD1 produced 175 hp (130 kW) at 4,888 RPM and 188 lb⋅ft (255 N⋅m) of torque. The first generation DOHC 6VD1-W was featured only in RS and some LS trim Trooper/Bighorns between 1992 and 1995, outputting 195 hp (145 kW) at 5600 RPM and 195 lb⋅ft (264 N⋅m) of torque at 3600 RPM. This DOHC variant had low impedance injectors as well as a higher compression ratio than the SOHC, necessitating the use of a knock sensor.

The second generation SOHC 6VD1 made 190 hp (140 kW) from 1996 to 1997. In 1998, the same engine was available in DOHC form with 205 hp (153 kW) as the 6VD1-W. It was produced until 2002 with the termination of the Isuzu Trooper. Both versions feature a 93.4 mm (3.68 in) bore and a 77.0 mm (3.03 in) stroke, giving it a total displacement of 3,165 cc (193.1 cu in).

Applications:

- Isuzu Trooper
- Isuzu MU
- Isuzu Faster
- Isuzu Rodeo / Isuzu Rodeo Sport / Isuzu Amigo / Honda Passport
- Isuzu VehiCROSS
- Opel Frontera B

== 6VE1 ==
The 6VE1-W 3.5 L DOHC 24V V6 was introduced in 1998 with 215 hp (160 kW) and used until 2004 with the termination of the Isuzu Axiom. Drive by wire was introduced in 2002 and increased output to 230 hp (173 kW). Gasoline direct injection was added for 2004 only and boosted output to 250 hp (186 kW). This was a stroked version of the 6VD1; having an 85.0 mm (3.35 in) stroke and a total displacement of 3,494 cc (213.2 cu in).

Applications:

- Chevrolet LUV D-Max
- Isuzu Trooper
- Isuzu VehiCROSS
- Isuzu MU
- Isuzu Axiom
- Isuzu Rodeo
