= GM 4L30-E transmission =

4L30-E

Overview
- Manufacturer: General Motors
- Production: 1991–2004

Body and chassis
- Class: 4-speed longitudinal automatic transmission

Chronology
- Predecessor: TH180/3L30
- Successor: 5L40-E/5L50

The 4L30-E was an automatic transmission developed and produced by General Motors. It was developed for light-duty use in longitudinal engine rear-wheel drive vehicles, replacing the similar TH180/3L30. The 4L30-E was used in many European and Japanese vehicles, including the BMW 3- and 5 Series, Isuzu Rodeo and its derivatives, and Opel Omega/Cadillac Catera. It was replaced by the 5-speed 5L40-E/5L50. The 4L30-E was built at GM's transmission plant in Strasbourg, France.

== Technical data ==
=== Gear ratios ===
Type/Gear	1	2	3	4	R
A (Opel/BMW)	2,400	1,467	1,000	0,723	-2,000
B (Isuzu Trooper/Rodeo)	2,860	1,620	1,000	0,723	-2,000

=== Torque ===
The 4L30-E can handle up to 350 Nm of engine torque.

== Applications ==
- 1996–2000 Acura SLX
- 1992–1998 BMW 318i
- 1997–1999 BMW 323i
- 1992–1995 BMW 325i
- 1996–1999 BMW 328i
- 1990–1996 BMW 518i: Type A
- 1990–1996 BMW 525i
- 1992–1996 BMW 525td: Type B
- 1996–1999 BMW 528i
- 1996–2000 BMW Z3
- 1997–2001 Cadillac Catera
- 1992–1998 Chevrolet Omega
- 1994–2001 Honda Passport
- 1998–2000 Isuzu Amigo
- 2002–2003 Isuzu Axiom
- 1999–2001 Isuzu VehiCROSS
- 1991–2003 Isuzu Rodeo
- 2001–2003 Isuzu Rodeo Sport
- 1990–2002 Isuzu Trooper
- 1996– Opel Frontera
- 1998–1999 Opel Monterey
- 1995–2001 Opel Omega B

== See also ==
- List of GM transmissions
