= Isuzu Axiom =

Mid-size SUV

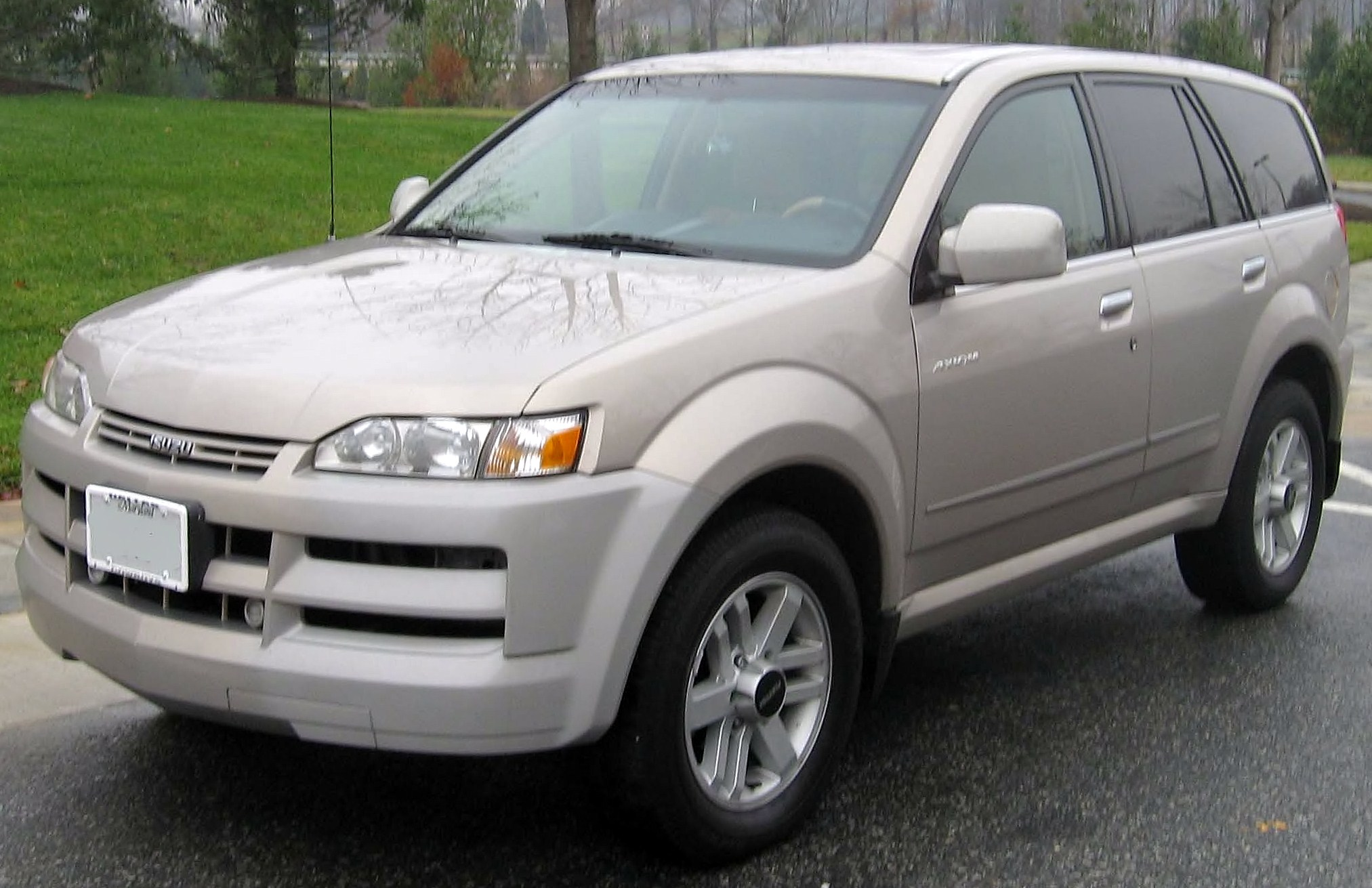

Overview
- Manufacturer: Isuzu
- Production: 2001–2004
- Model years: 2002–2004
- Assembly: United States: Lafayette, Indiana (Subaru Isuzu Automotive)

Body and chassis
- Class: Mid-size SUV
- Body style: 5-door SUV
- Layout: Front-engine, rear-wheel drive or four-wheel drive
- Chassis: Body-on-frame
- Related: Isuzu Rodeo

Powertrain
- Engine: 3.5 L GDI 6VE1-DI V6/3.5 L 6VE1 V6 (gasoline)
- Transmission: 4-speed automatic AW 30-40LS / GM 4L30-E transmission

Dimensions
- Wheelbase: 106.4 in (2,703 mm)
- Length: 182.6 in (4,638 mm)
- Width: 70.7 in (1,796 mm)
- Height: 67.2 in (1,707 mm)

Chronology
- Predecessor: Isuzu Trooper
- Successor: Isuzu Ascender (short wheelbase)

The Isuzu Axiom is a mid-size SUV introduced by Isuzu in 2001 for the 2002 model year. The Axiom is derived from the Isuzu Rodeo and was intended to be Isuzu's response to the popularity of car-based SUVs, such as the Toyota Highlander, replacing the Trooper as Isuzu's flagship vehicle in the United States.

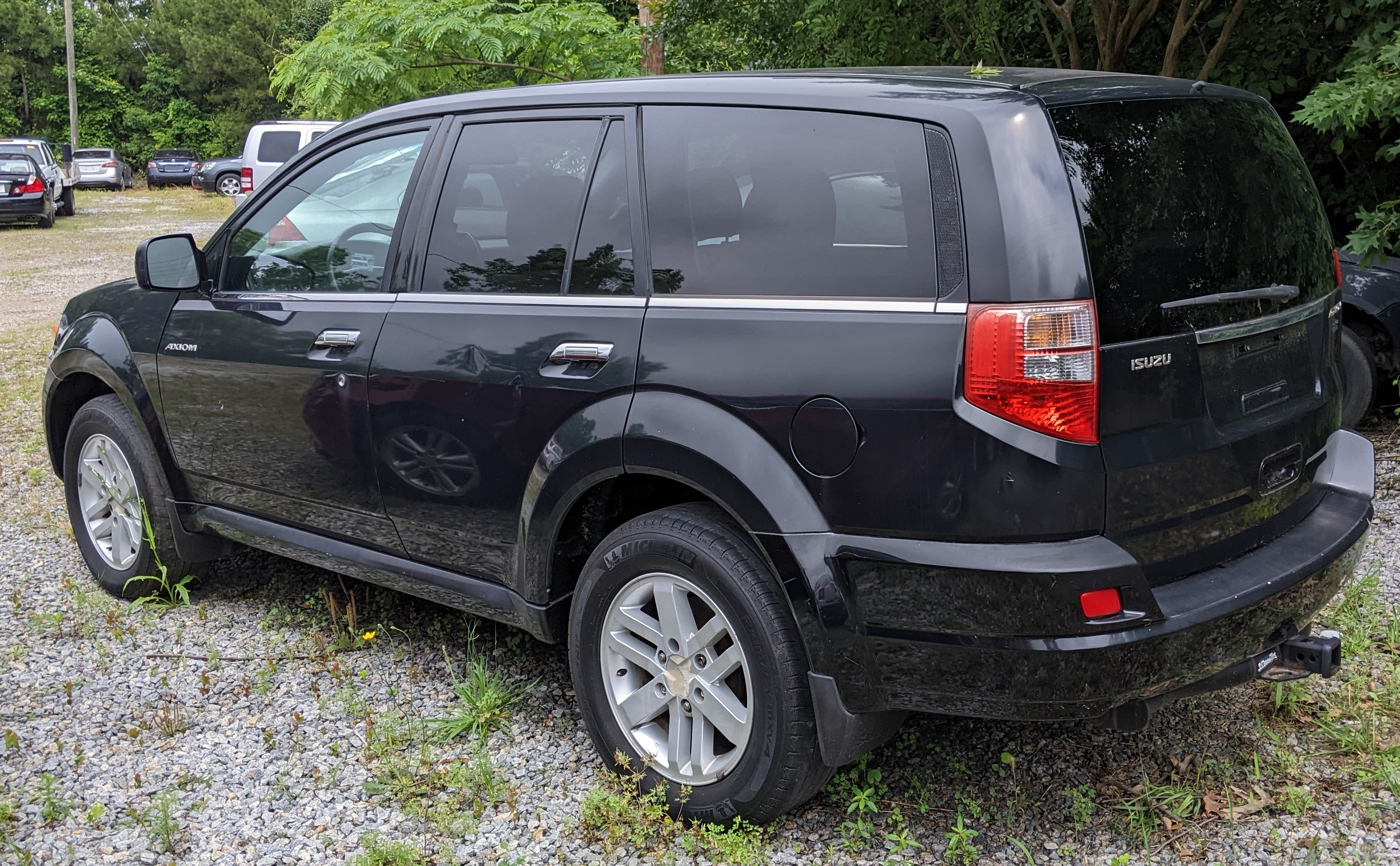
Rear view

Exclusively sold in the United States and Costa Rica, the Axiom was built alongside the Rodeo in Lafayette, Indiana, at Subaru Isuzu Automotive, Inc. The peculiar styling and truck-based platform was poorly received in the marketplace. The Axiom was discontinued and replaced by the Chevrolet TrailBlazer-derived Isuzu Ascender in 2004, leading to Isuzu's withdrawal from manufacturing and selling passenger vehicles in North America in 2009.

The Axiom had two trim levels: the base and the up-level XS. The XS trim had features like fog lamps, a sunroof, heated front seats, an auto-dimming mirror with Homelink, 12-speaker premium audio, and leather upholstery. The name "Axiom" was determined by a naming contest held by Isuzu and won by Dr. Hakan Urey from Redmond, Washington, who suggested the name and won his own Axiom in 2001. The word means an established, accepted, or self-evidently true statement or proposition.

The Axiom is available with a Torque-On-Demand four-wheel drive system, a direct-injection 6VE1-DI V6 engine and an Aisin Warner AW30-40LS automatic transmission was added in 2004, boosting power from 230 to 250 hp (172 to 186 kW). A new chrome bar grille and liftgate chrome that stretched tail light to tail light was also added.

The Axiom was discontinued in July 2004, and the Lafayette plant was retooled to build the Subaru B9 Tribeca. With the retirement of the Rodeo and Axiom, Isuzu, which once sold a complete line of cars, trucks and SUVs, no longer offered any Japanese-built consumer vehicles in the United States (from 2004–2009, the lineup consisted only of rebadged General Motors vehicles).

In 2013, a recall was issued for the Isuzu Axiom for frames with severe rust issues, NHTSA Campaign Number 13V547000. Similar related vehicles, 1998–2002 Isuzu Rodeo and Honda Passport NHTSA Recall Campaign Number 10V436000, and Isuzu Amigo in 2012, Campaign Number 12V306000.

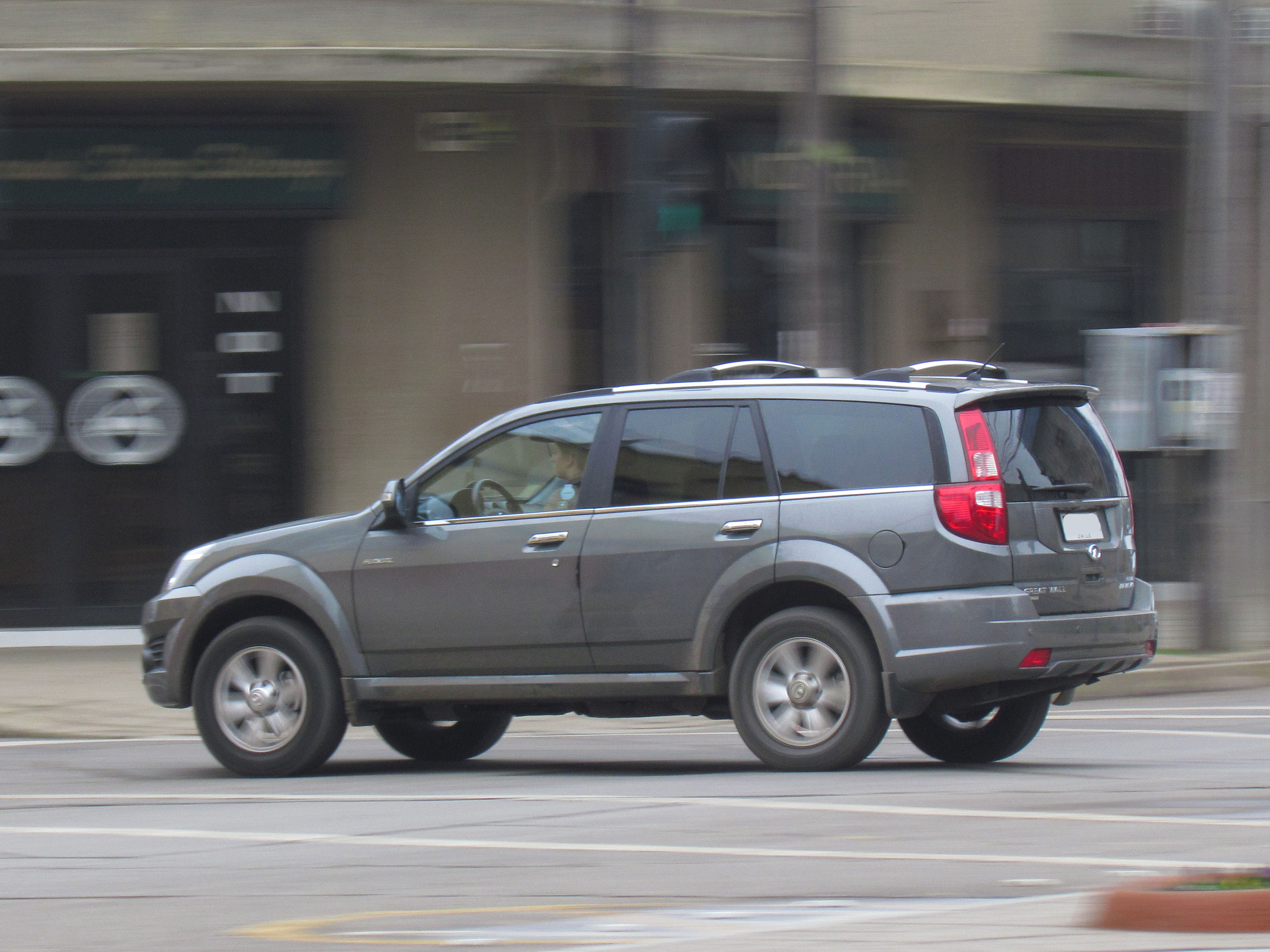
Haval H3

The Axiom is a slightly diluted production version of the 1999 Isuzu ZXS concept that debuted at the 1999 Tokyo Motor Show. Isuzu also built 3 Axiom concepts: the 2001 Axiom XSF, 2002 Axiom XSR, and 2003 Axiom XST.

Chinese manufacturer Great Wall later copied the design of the Axiom for their Haval H3/Hover SUV, albeit with a minor restyling of the body.

The 2001 movie Spy Kids and its 2002 sequel featured an Isuzu Axiom as part of a promotion, even having a lenticular poster and an RC car made by RadioShack.
