= Opel Frontera =

Opel Frontera may refer to:

- a sport utility vehicle (SUV) produced in the UK, based on the Isuzu MU
- Opel Frontera (2024), a petrol and electric B-segment crossover SUV
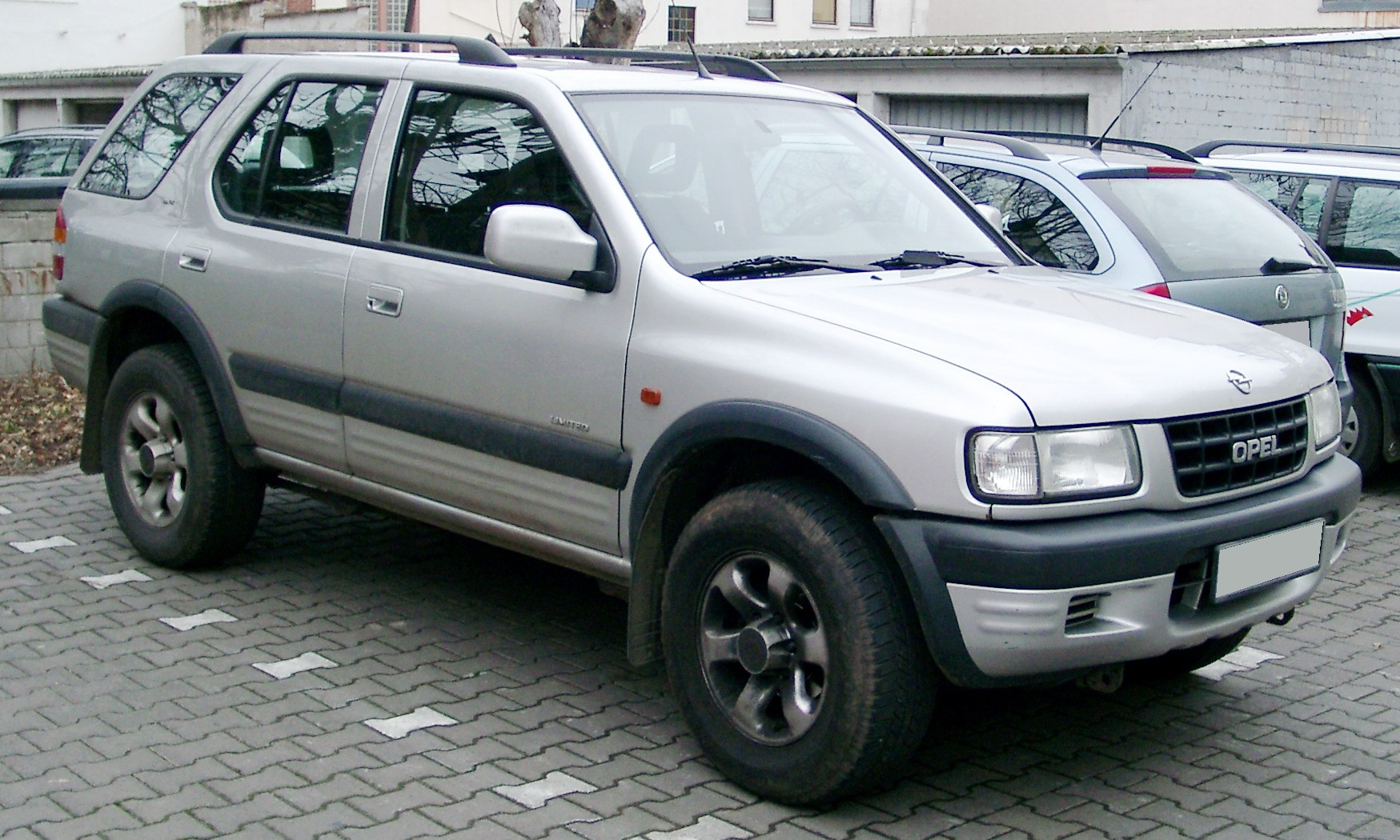
Opel Frontera

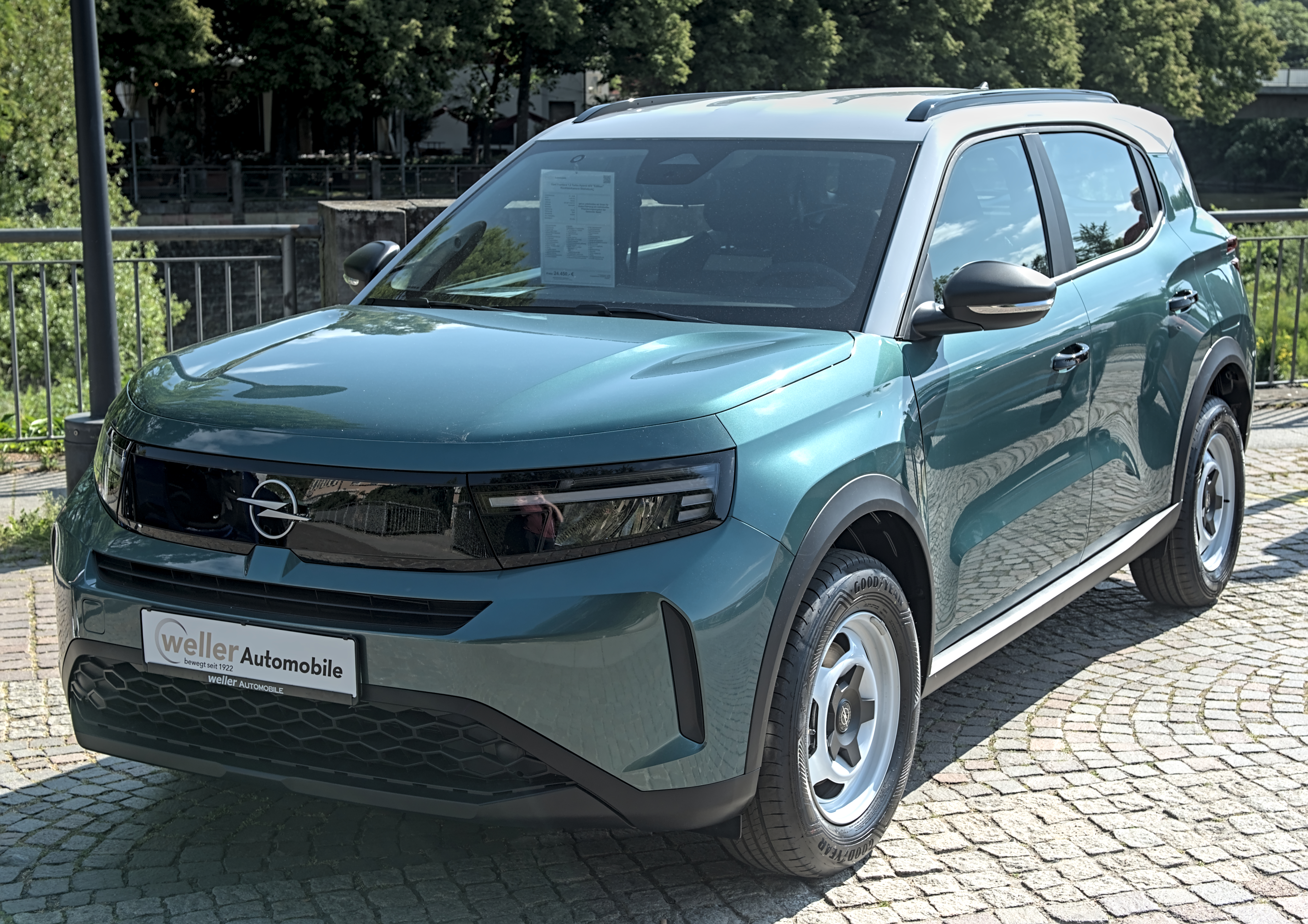
Opel Frontera (2024)

== See also ==
- Vauxhall Frontera
