= Isuzu MU =

Mid-size SUV

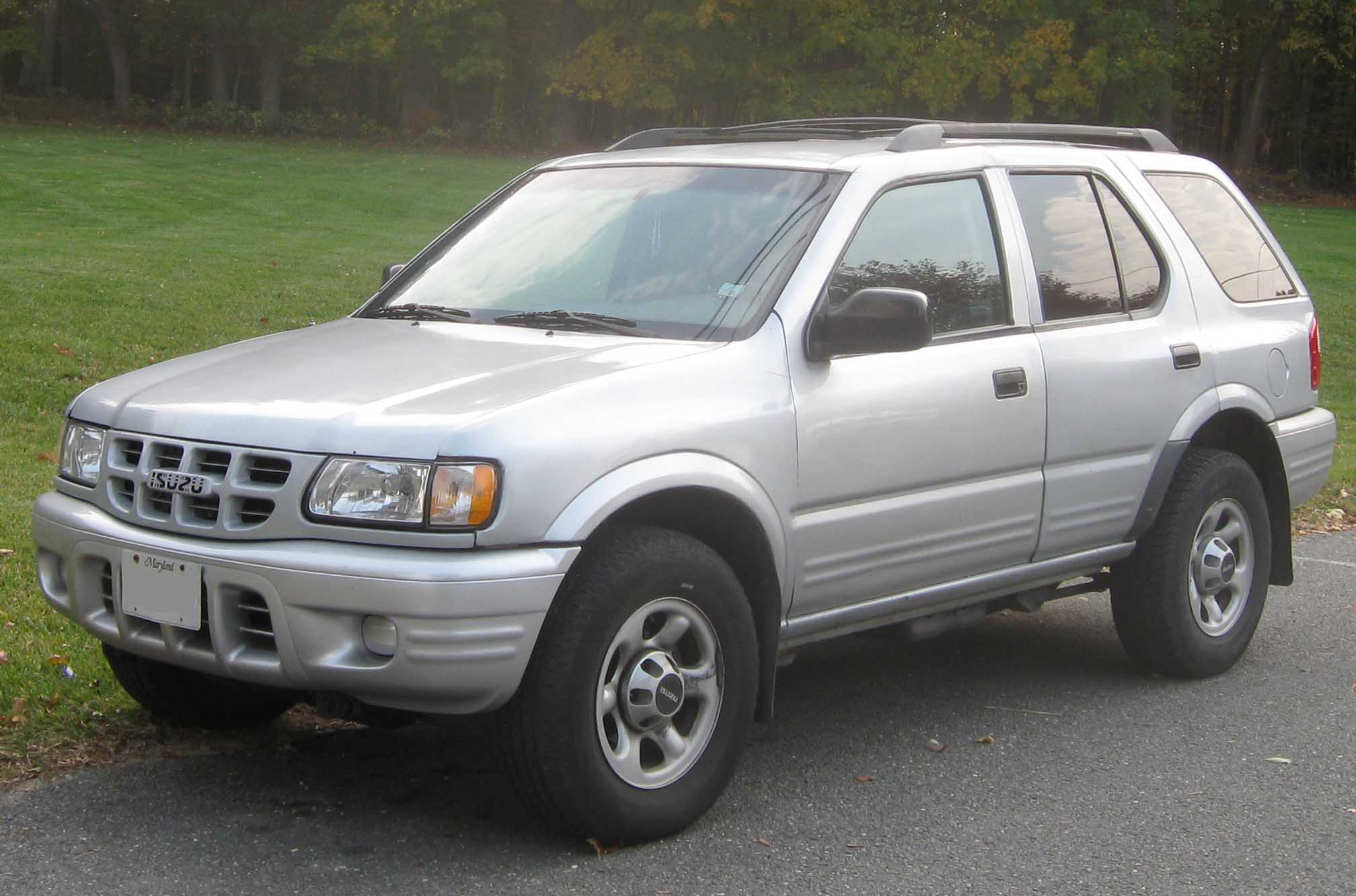

Overview
- Manufacturer: Isuzu
- Production: 1989–2005

Body and chassis
- Class: Mid-size SUV
- Body style: 3/5-door SUV
- Layout: Front-engine, rear-wheel drive / four-wheel drive
- Chassis: Body-on-frame

Chronology
- Successor: Isuzu Ascender (North America); Isuzu MU-7 (Southeast Asia); Opel Frontera (Europe); Vauxhall Frontera (United Kingdom)

The Isuzu MU is a mid-size SUV which was produced by Japan-based manufacturer Isuzu from 1989 to 2005.

The three-door MU was introduced in 1989, followed in 1990 by the five-door version called Isuzu MU Wizard. Production of these first generation models ceased in 1998 to be replaced by a second generation. This time, the five-door version dropped the "MU" prefix, to become the Isuzu Wizard. The acronym "MU" is short for "Mysterious Utility". Isuzu manufactured several variations to the MU and its derivates for sale in other countries.

The short-wheelbase (three-door) version was sold as the Isuzu MU and Honda Jazz in Japan, with the names Isuzu Amigo and later Isuzu Rodeo Sport used in the United States. Throughout continental Europe, the three-door was called the Opel Frontera Sport, with the Vauxhall Frontera Sport name used in the United Kingdom, and Holden Frontera Sport in Australia.

The long-wheelbase (five-door) version was available as the Isuzu Wizard in Japan, and in North America as Isuzu Rodeo and the Honda Passport. Opel, Vauxhall, and Holden each also sold rebadged versions of the five-door as the Opel Frontera, Vauxhall Frontera, and Holden Frontera. It was also sold as the Chevrolet Frontera in Egypt, the Isuzu Cameo and Isuzu Vega in Thailand, the Isuzu Frontier in South Africa, and as the Chevrolet Rodeo in Ecuador, Colombia and Bolivia.

== First generation (1989) ==
First generation
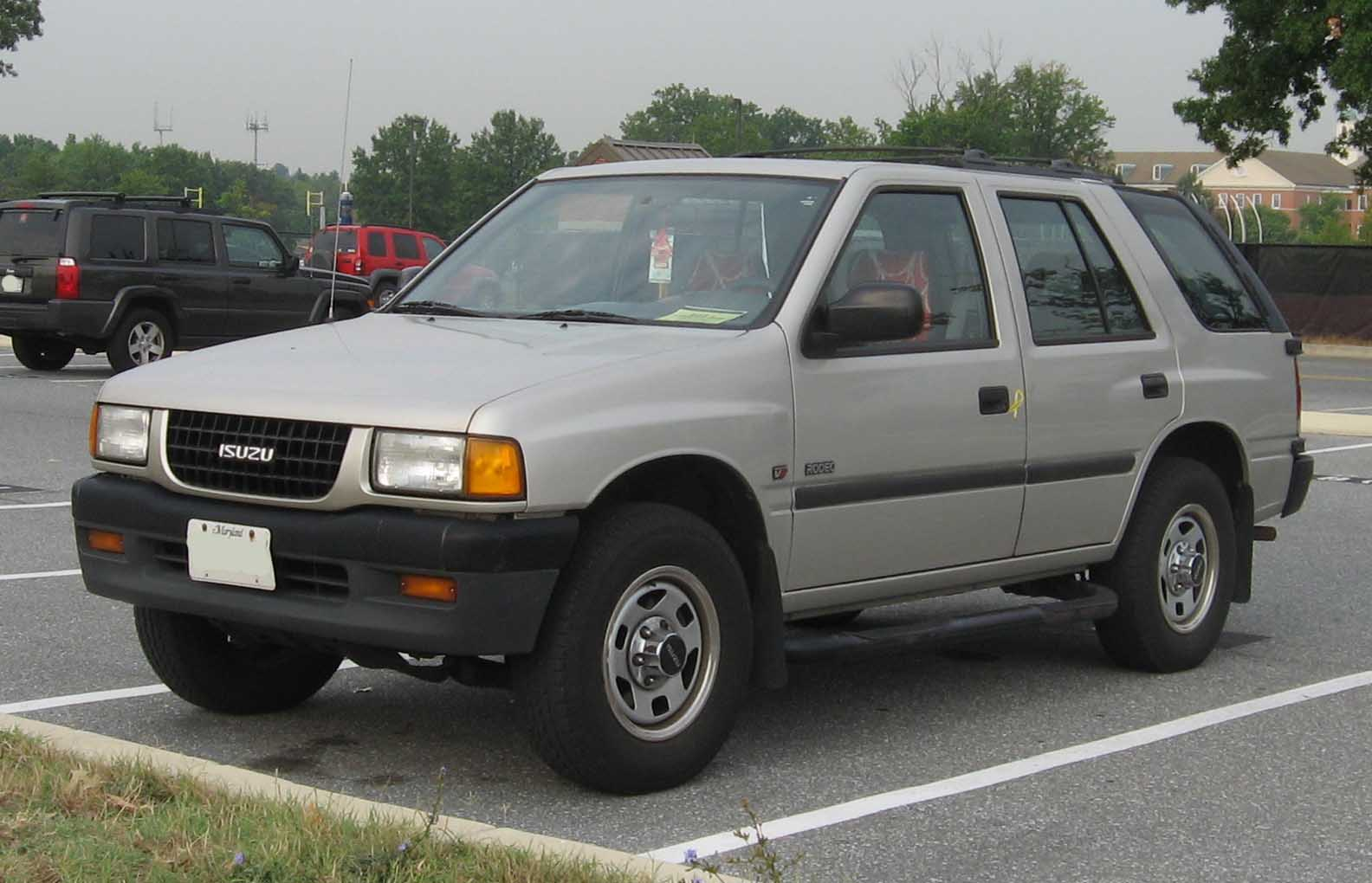
- Isuzu Rodeo

Overview
- Model code: UCS55; UCS69GW
- Also called: Isuzu Amigo; Isuzu Mysterious Utility Wizard (Japan); Isuzu Cameo (Thailand); Isuzu Frontier (South Africa); Isuzu Rodeo; Isuzu Vega (Thailand); Chevrolet Frontera (Egypt); Chevrolet Rodeo; Holden Frontera; Honda Jazz; Honda Passport; Opel Frontera; Vauxhall Frontera
- Production: 1989–1998; 1993–2002 (Thailand); 1998–2003 (Egypt)
- Assembly: Japan: Fujisawa, Kanagawa (Fujisawa Plant); Egypt: 6th of October City; Thailand: Rayong (Isuzu Motors Co, Thailand); United Kingdom: Luton (IBC Vehicles); United States: Lafayette, Indiana (Subaru of Indiana Automotive, Inc.)
- Designer: Hiromu Wada (1987)

Body and chassis
- Related: Isuzu Faster (TF); Landwind X6/X9

Powertrain
- Engine: gasoline: 2.0 L C20NE/X20SE I4; 2.2 L X22XE I4; 2.3 L 4ZD1 I4; 2.4 L C24NE I4 (Europe); 2.6 L 4ZE1 I4; 3.1 L LG6 V6; 3.2 L 6VD1/6VD1W V6; diesel: 2.3 L 23DTR turbo I4; 2.5 L 4JA1 I4 (Cameo, TH); 2.5 L VM41B OHV turbo I4; 2.8 L 4JB1-T turbo I4; 3.0 L 4JH1-T turbo I4; 3.1 L 4JG2 turbo I4
- Transmission: 5-speed manual 4-speed 4L30-E Technomatic automatic

Dimensions
- Wheelbase: SWB: 91.7 in (2,329 mm); LWB: 108.7 in (2,761 mm)
- Curb weight: 3,490–3,820 lb (1,580–1,730 kg)

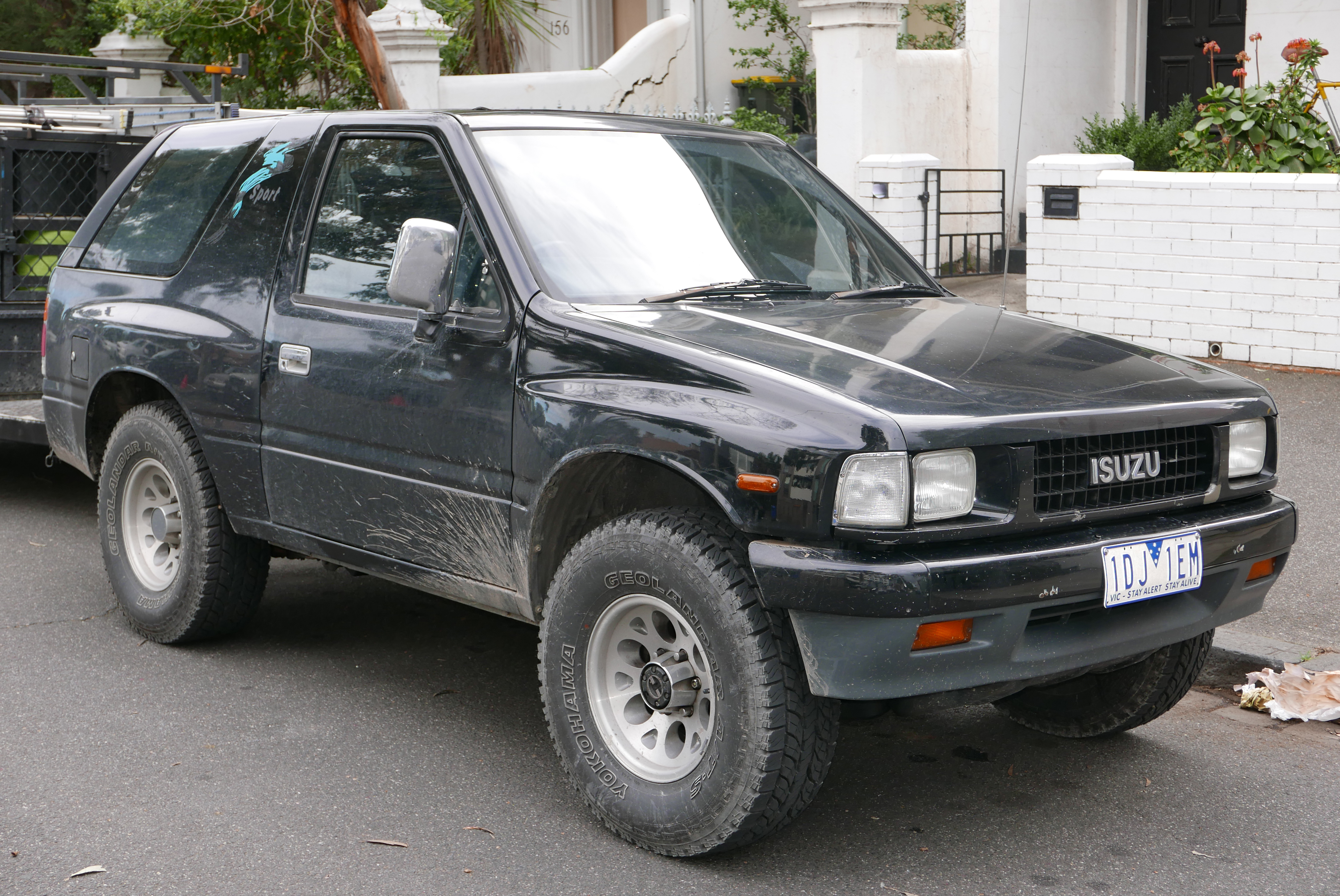
1989–1992 Isuzu MU (UCS55) 3-door (Australia)

The three-door Isuzu MU made its debut in Japan during 1989, with the five-door MU Wizard introduced the following year. Based on the Isuzu Faster (TF) pickup truck of 1988, both the three- and five-door models shared bodywork and most internal components from the front doors forward. Like the Faster pickup, the MU and MU Wizard featured rear- and four-wheel drive layout configurations.

Between 1993 and 1996, Honda retailed three-door versions of the MU under the name Honda Jazz for the Japanese market under a model sharing arrangement that resulted in several Isuzu models being badged Honda and vice versa.

=== Markets ===
==== North America ====
Sales of the three-door began in the United States during the second quarter of 1989 under the Isuzu Amigo name. A 2.3-liter 4ZD1 inline-four engine, producing 102 hp (76 kW) came standard with the RWD while the 4WD was offered with the 2.6-liter 4ZE1 engine. The transmission was initially manual only. There were very limited options for the early Amigo including air conditioning, seating for two or four, and two trim levels to choose from, S or XS.

Some of the model year changes throughout production included:

- 1991: small cosmetic alterations, including a more rounded grille
- 1992: the standardization of the 2.6-liter engine and the added availability of a four-speed automatic transmission on the RWD version for 1992.
- 1993: the grille was enlarged and the front bumper slightly altered.
- 1994, a high mount rear stop light was added and power steering and mirrors were made standard.
- 1995: The Amigo was dropped by Isuzu in the US market.

A limited number of XS-F editions (with the "F" standing for "Frontera") were produced which had additional options such as power windows and locking as well as four-wheel anti-lock brakes (ABS), which were inactive in low-range 4WD mode and only active on the rear wheels in 4WD high-range. This version of the Amigo had only 49-state emissions (reasons unknown) and there are no official sales numbers, although most dealers agree there were fewer than 75 sold. The only badging used to distinguish this model from the outside was a sport-blue XS symbol with a sport-font "F" beside it (also finished in sport blue).

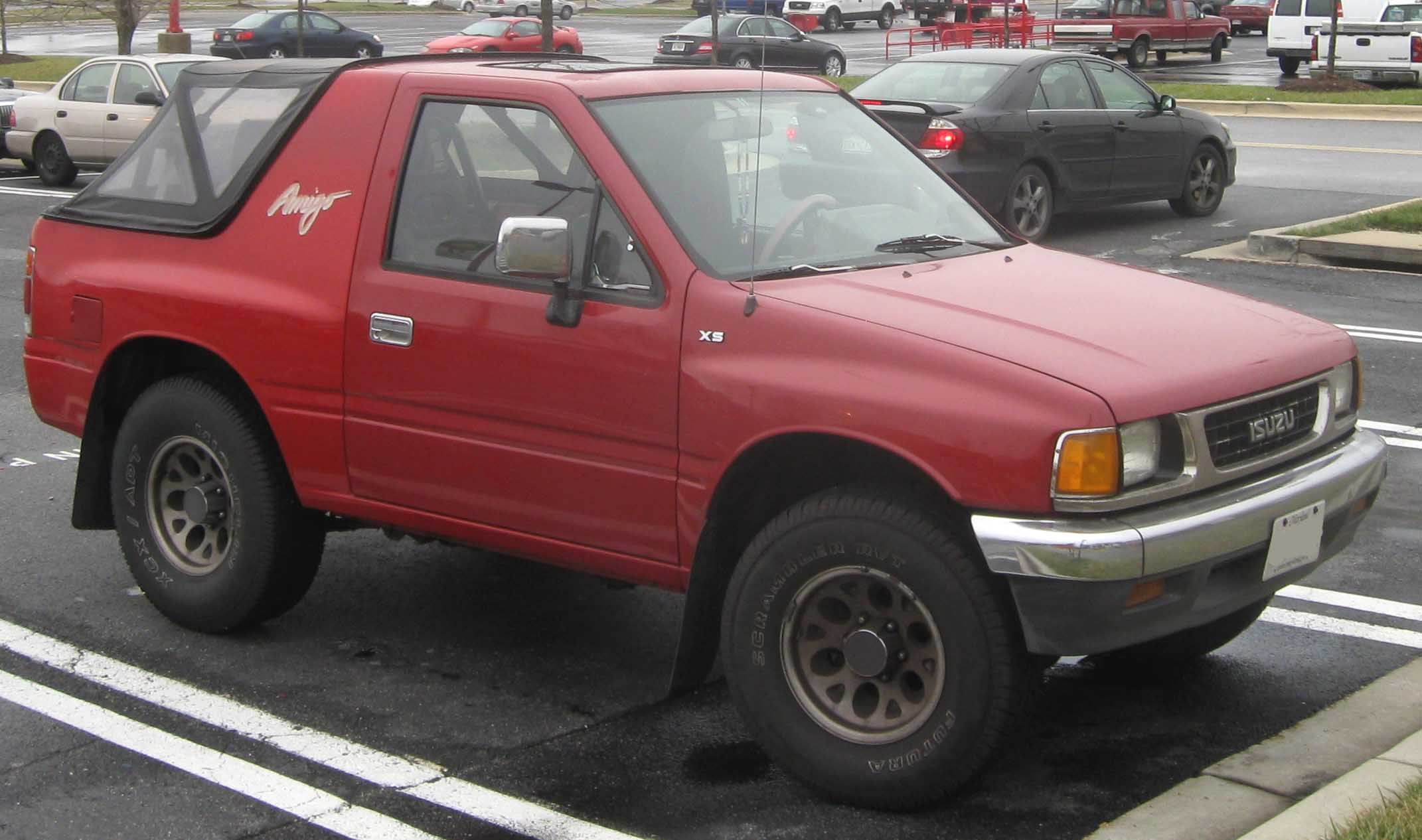
1991–1992 Isuzu Amigo XS (US)

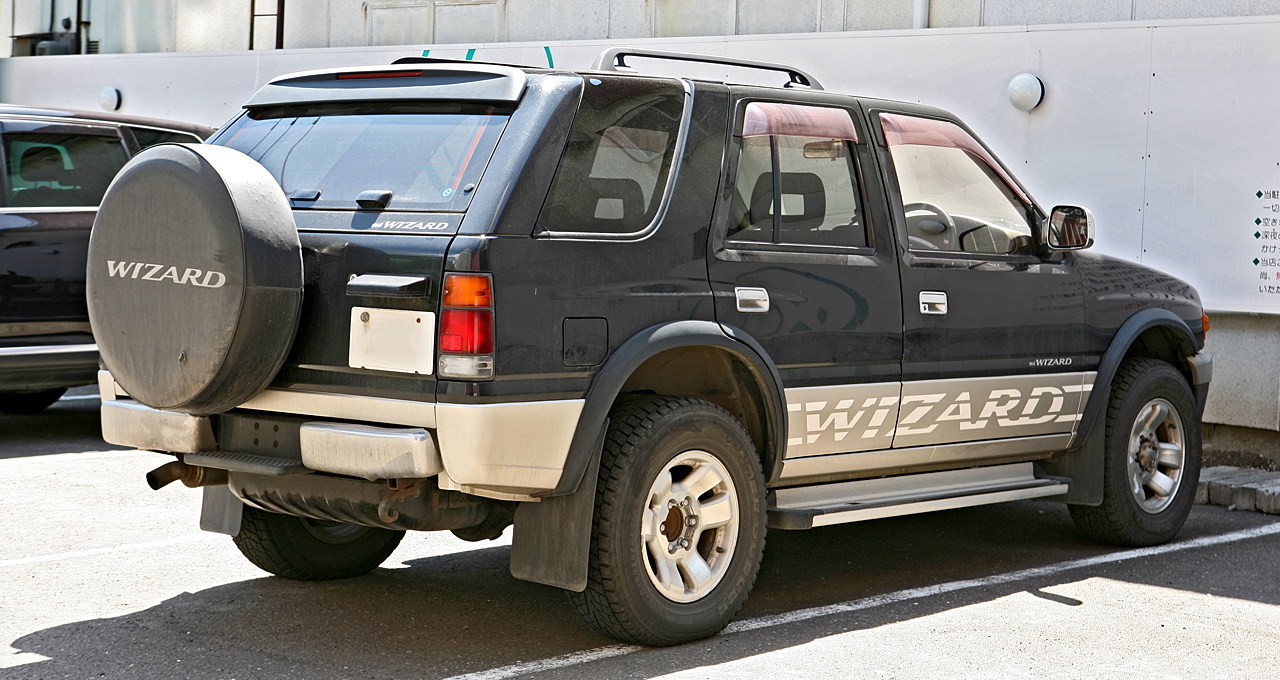
1995–1998 Isuzu MU Wizard 3.1 D Turbo Type X (UCS69GW; Japan)

Isuzu introduced the five-door Isuzu Rodeo to the United States in 1990 for the 1991 model year. It was available with either a 2.6-liter inline-four engine rated at 119 horsepower or a 3.1-liter V6 engine made by General Motors (GM), which had the same horsepower output as the 2.6 but more torque. An automatic transmission was available for the V6.

Like the Amigo, the Rodeo was available in both RWD and 4WD, with the latter featuring manually locking hubs on the S version and automatically locking hubs on the XS and top-of-the-line LS. Rear-wheel ABS were standard feature on 4WDs. A RWD manual transmission model with a 21.9 US gal (83 L) tank was rated at 18 mpg_{‑US} (13 L/100 km) in city driving by the EPA, and 22 mpg_{‑US} (11 L/100 km) on the highway. A 4WD model with the V6 and automatic transmission was rated at 15 mpg_{‑US} (16 L/100 km) city and 18 mpg_{‑US} (13 L/100 km) highway.

All Rodeos had a rear seat bottom which folded forward and rear seat back which folded down, extending the 35-cubic-foot (990 L) cargo area. The vehicle's lug wrench was stored under the seat bottom, concealed by a carpeted Velcro flap. The jack was located behind a plastic panel in the rear left of the cargo area along with the rear windshield washer fluid reservoir if equipped. The LS was available with privacy glass, velour upholstery, and split-folding rear seats. A secret locking compartment was fitted in the depths of the center console below a removable cassette storage bin. The vehicle weighed 3,490–3,820 pounds (1,580–1,730 kg), depending on engine and options.

For the 1993 model year, Isuzu replaced the GM V6 engine with their own 3.2-liter 24-valve SOHC V6 which was rated at 174 hp (130 kW). Manually locking hubs were eliminated, but the floor-mounted transfer case shifter remained. The 1993 Rodeo featured a recalibrated suspension system, softened spring rates and softened shock valving. The Rodeo now weighed between 3,536–4,120 pounds (1,604–1,869 kg) and the EPA rating was 18 mpg_{‑US} (13 L/100 km) city and 21 mpg_{‑US} (11 L/100 km) highway. Also for 1993, a Family II 2.4 litre four-cylinder engine from Holden was introduced, and the Rodeo gained a third brake light above the rear window and a more refined center console. The "V6" badge on V6 models was moved behind the front wheels. Midway through 1995, the Rodeo received an updated dashboard and steering wheel, both of which added airbags. The "ISUZU" badge on the front grille also shrunk in size. For 1996 Isuzu increased the power of their 3.2-liter V6 up to 194 hp (145 kW) and 262 N⋅m (193 lb⋅ft) of torque, and the top level trim LS received the same 16-inch aluminium wheels as the Trooper, and was available in two-tone exterior colors.

Isuzu sold 24,612 Rodeos in 1991 and 45,257 Rodeos in 1992. US models were manufactured at Subaru-Isuzu Automotive, Inc. (now, Subaru of Indiana Automotive, Inc.) in Lafayette, Indiana. The vehicle was still considered an import, as 75 percent of its parts were made overseas.

The first-generation Isuzu Rodeo and its twin, the Honda Passport, received a rating of "Poor" in the IIHS frontal offset test conducted at 40 mph due to a poor safety cage and dummy movement, and excessive footwell intrusion that contributed to injuries to both legs.

==== Europe ====
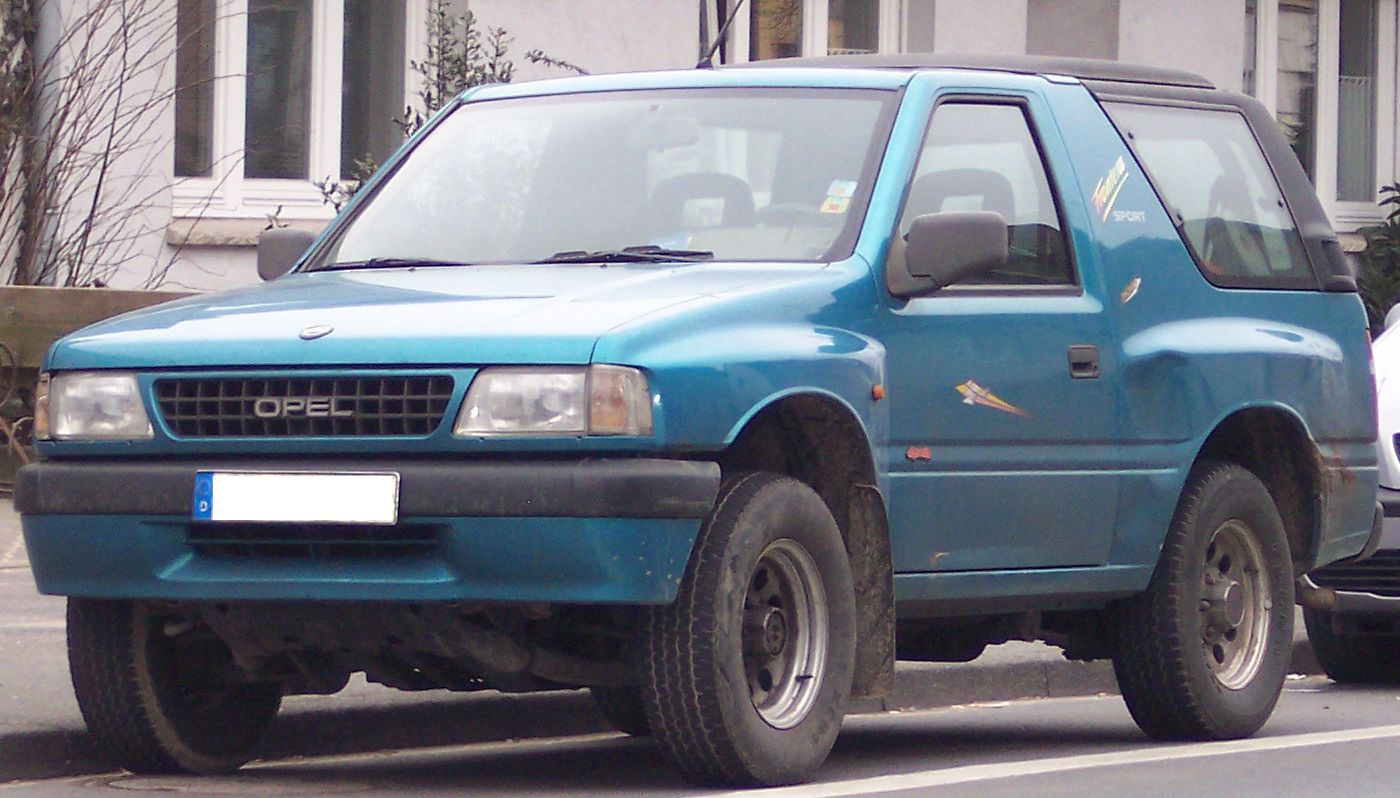
1991–1998 Opel Frontera Sport

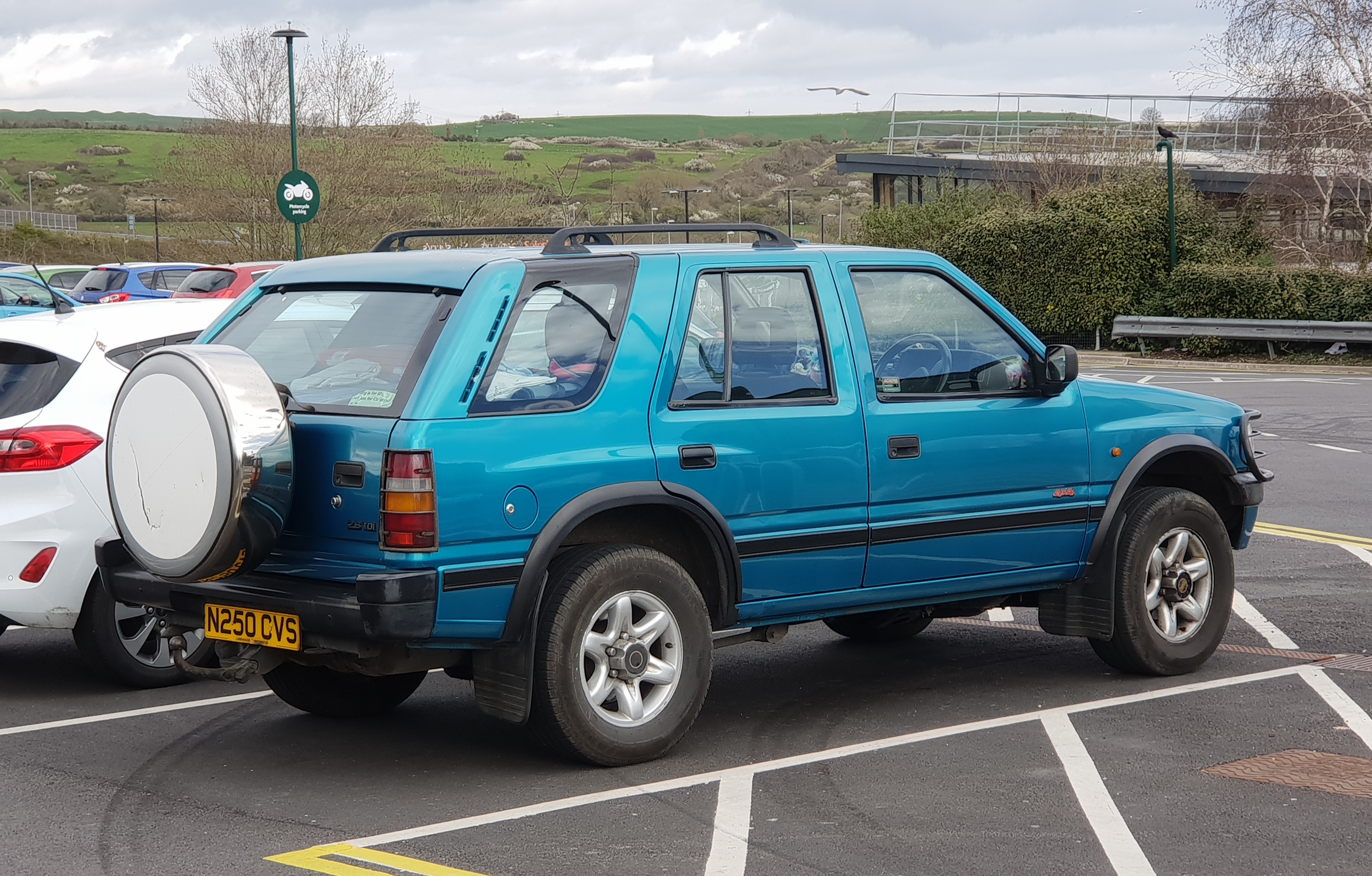
1995 Vauxhall Frontera 2.8 TDI

This series was known in the United Kingdom as the Vauxhall Frontera and in the rest of Europe as the Opel Frontera. It was launched in November 1991 and built at the former Bedford van factory in Luton, England; it would become known as the IBC factory (Isuzu Bedford Company). In the 1980s the plant had come under joint control between Isuzu and General Motors, with the Frontera being built alongside a number of other commercial vehicle models. The Australian and New Zealand version of the model range was known as the Holden Frontera and these were also produced at the Luton facility. The Frontera was Vauxhall's answer to the growing demand for 4X4 vehicles in Europe - particularly the right-hand drive British market - during the 1980s, where Japanese imported products from Daihatsu, Mitsubishi, Nissan, Suzuki and Toyota had proven hugely successful, not to mention the success of the long-running British Land Rover and Range Rover. Despite the vast and growing competition in the 4X4 market, the Frontera sold well throughout Europe.

The early cars (to 1995) had a choice of engines, with the LWB available with either a 2.4-liter petrol (C24NE) engine (developed in the Opel Manta i240) or the 2.3-liter diesel (23DTR) engine originally fitted in the Bedford CF van and Vauxhall Carlton. The Frontera sport (Isuzu Amigo) was available with the 2.0-liter petrol Vauxhall Cavalier engine (C20NE).

In 1995, the model went through a facelift and the Frontera received rear coil springs and a new line up of engines. The SWB gained a new 2.0-liter petrol (X20 series) engine, updated trim, and also the first diesel engine available for the SWB, the 2.8-liter (4JB1-TC). The LWB also had new engines, with the 2.2-liter petrol (X22SE) and the 2.8 diesel 4JB1-TC being made available.

In the 1996–1997 models interior trim, including the dashboard, was changed, and a new 2.5-liter diesel (VM41) engine was fitted. This engine was also used in the Range Rover Classic and Jeep Cherokee in the UK.

==== Australia ====
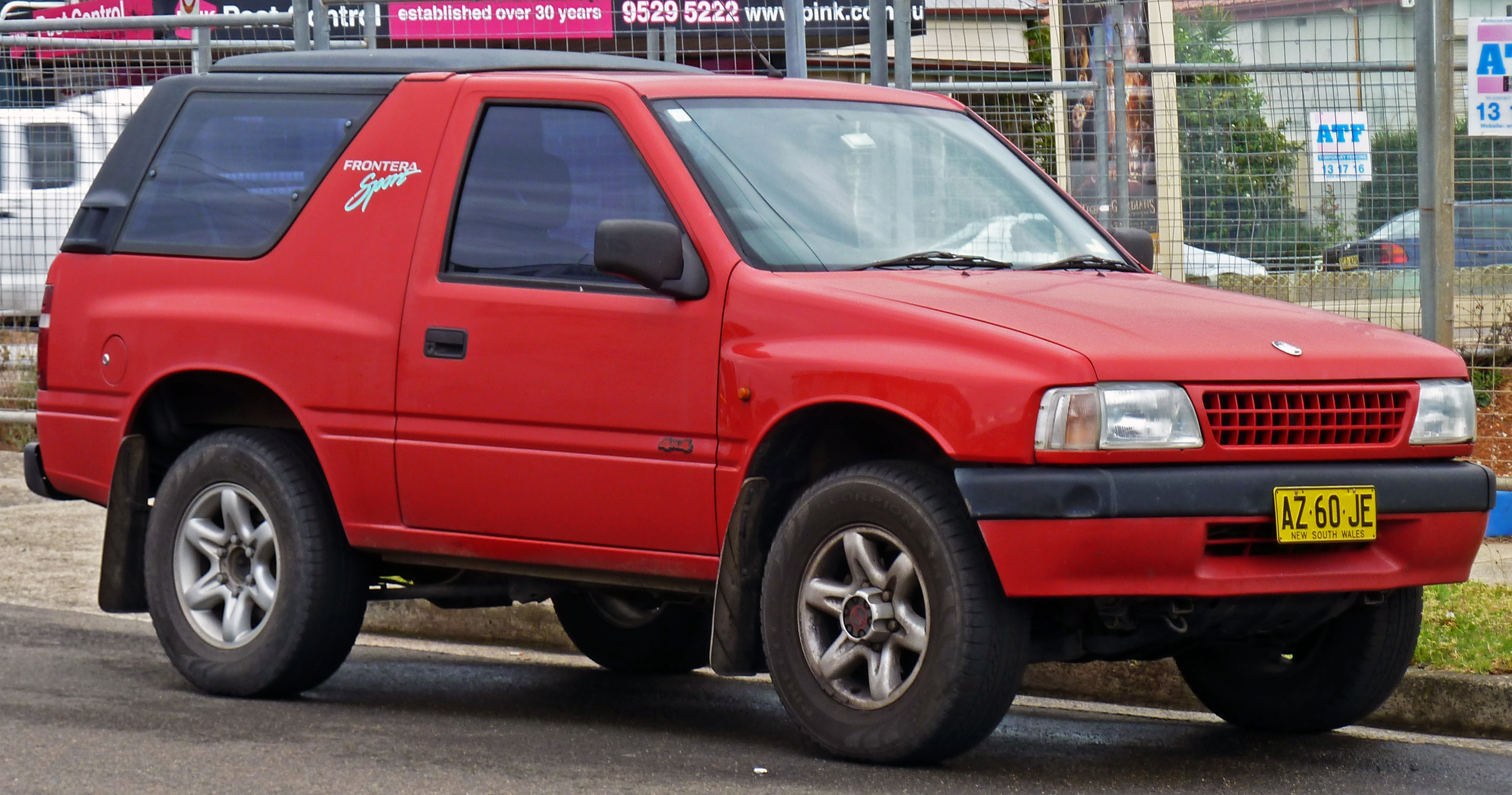
1995–1998 Holden Frontera (UT) Sport hardtop (Australia)

In October 1995, Holden of Australia and New Zealand introduced the MU under the Holden "Frontera" badge in Australia and Holden "Wizard" badge in New Zealand. Designated the UT or M7 series, the Holden was based on the three-door body and manufactured in the United Kingdom. It was offered in one level of trim, the "Sport 4×4", offered solely with a manual transmission.

==== Asia ====
Jiangling (Jiangling Motors Corporation Limited) Landwind in China produces a copy of the Isuzu Rodeo for the Chinese market. It is the first SUV to fail the Euro NCAP crash tests. The Landwind is based on the first generation Rodeo although there was no collaboration between JMC and Isuzu or GM. While the Landwind looks like the Rodeo it is not an Isuzu vehicle.

For the Thai market, the MU Wizard was sold as the Isuzu Cameo (1993–1996) and Isuzu Vega (1999–2004) in Thailand. The Cameo using a 2.5-liter 4JA1 diesel direct injection engine, producing 90 PS (66 kW) at 3,900 rpm and the maximum torque of 17.8 kg⋅m (175 N⋅m; 129 lb⋅ft) at 1,800 rpm came standard. The transmission was 5-speed manual with rear wheel drive only. The equipment is the same as in the TF and the only body style available is a five-door wagon. In 1999, Isuzu Thailand decided to have a major change for Cameo and gave it new name Vega, equipped with four-wheel drive only. Exterior differences from Cameo including the new frontal design, halogen headlights, 15-inch wheels with 265/70R15 tires and the spare wheel on the back door. It was introduced with 2.8-liter engine 4JB1-T and the brand new 3.0-liter 4JH1-T turbodiesel, producing 120 PS (88 kW) at 3,800 rpm and maximum torque of 24.5 kg⋅m (240 N⋅m; 177 lb⋅ft) at 2,000 rpm, because of the development of the CCI (ISUZU Computer Controlled Injection) and HPI (ISUZU High Pressure Fuel Injection). In addition, it connected with a choice of 5-speed manual and "Technomatics" 4-speed automatic controlled by the TCM system (Transmission Control Module). The driver can manually choose style of driving by "Normal mode" and "Power mode".

== Second generation (1998) ==
Second generation
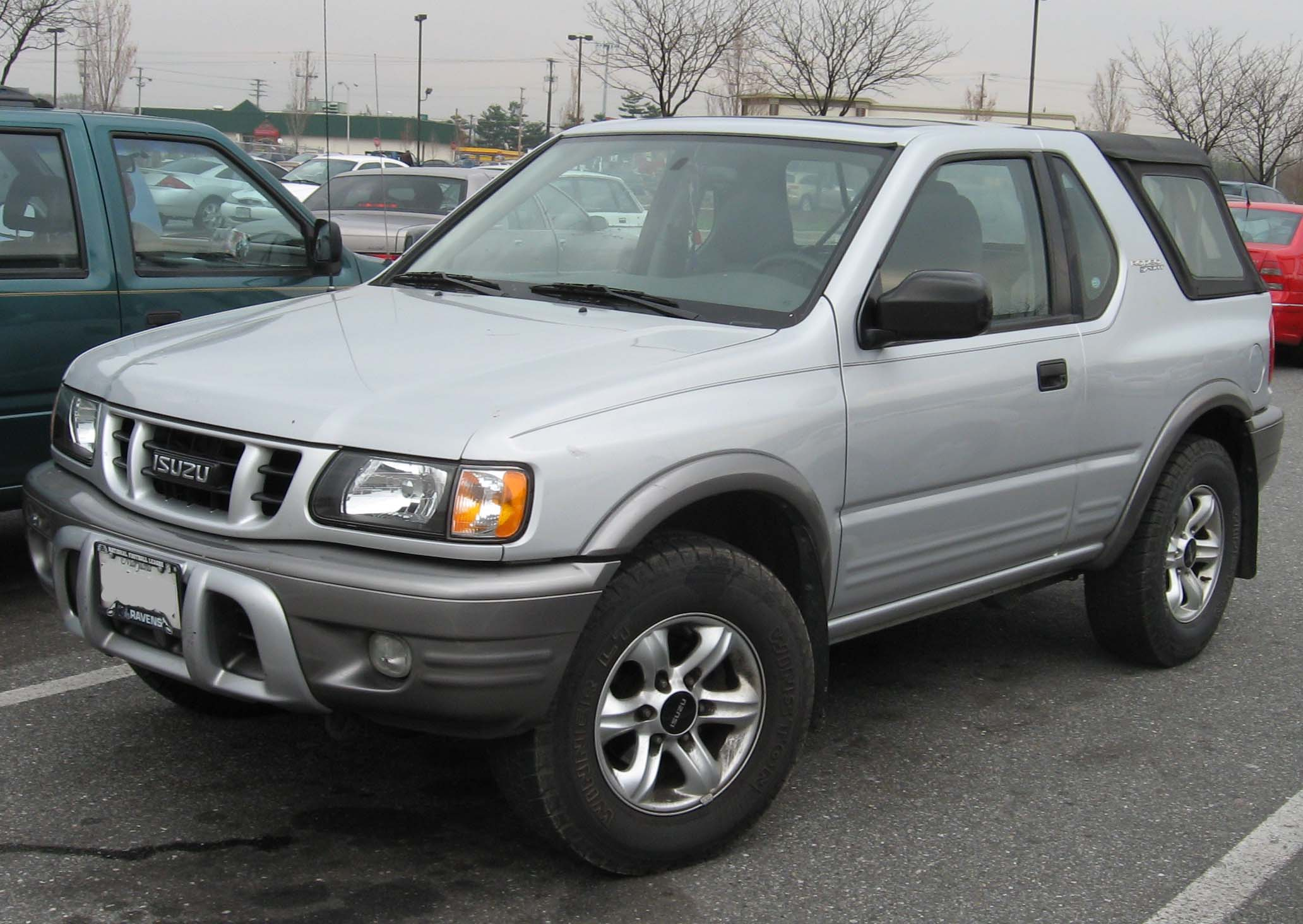

Overview
- Model code: UER25FW; UES25FW; UES73FW
- Also called: Chevrolet Frontera; Isuzu Amigo; Isuzu Rodeo; Isuzu Rodeo Sport; Isuzu Wizard (Japan); Holden Frontera; Holden Frontera Sport; Honda Passport; Opel Frontera; Opel Frontera Sport; Vauxhall Frontera; Vauxhall Frontera Sport
- Production: 1998–2005
- Assembly: Japan: Fujisawa, Kanagawa (Fujisawa Plant); United States: Lafayette, Indiana.; United Kingdom: Luton (IBC Vehicles); Tunisia: Kairouan (IMM)
- Designer: Takahiro Uematsu (1996)

Body and chassis
- Related: Isuzu Axiom

Powertrain
- Engine: gasoline: 2.2 L X22SE/Y22SE I4; 3.2 L 6VD1 V6; 3.5 L 6VE1W V6; diesel: 2.2 L X22DTH/Y22DTH turbo I4
- Transmission: 5-speed MUA5 manual; 4-speed 4L30-E automatic; 4-speed AW30-40LS automatic

Dimensions
- Wheelbase: SWB: 2,461 mm (96.9 in); LWB: 2,700 mm (106.3 in)
- Length: SWB: 4,267 mm (168.0 in) (w/ spare tire); LWB: 4,488 mm (176.7 in); 4,653 mm (183.2 in) (w/ spare tire)
- Width: 1,788 mm (70.4 in)
- Height: SWB: 1,702 mm (67.0 in); LWB: 1,679 mm (66.1 in)
- Curb weight: SWB: 1,510–1,706 kg (3,329–3,762 lb); LWB: 1,585–1,781 kg (3,495–3,926 lb)

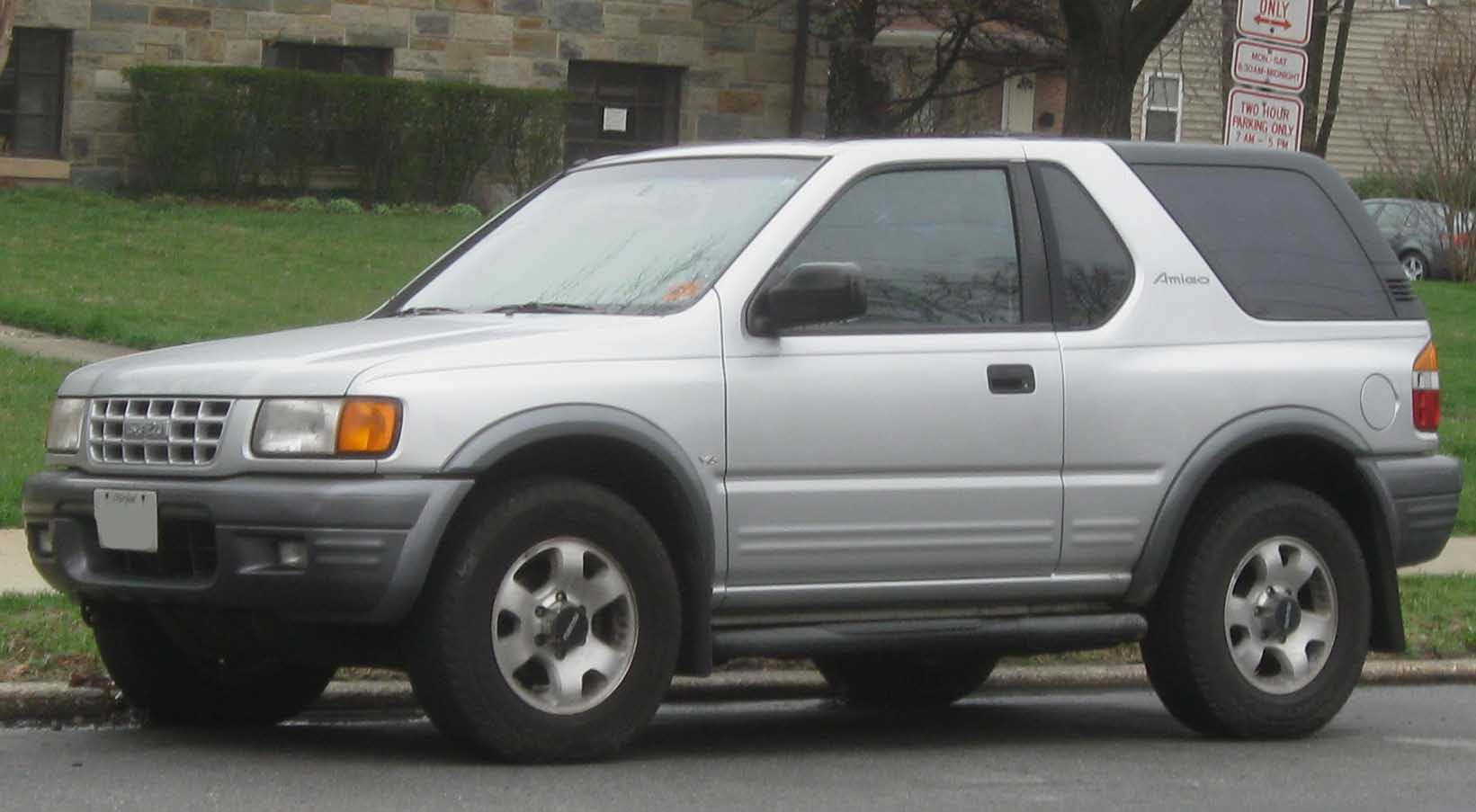
1999 Isuzu Amigo (US)

In September 1997, the second-generation MU (three-door) and Wizard (five-door; now with "MU" prefix dropped) were shown at the Tokyo Motor Show, with Japanese sales starting May 1998. North American and European sales began shortly thereafter.

In 2004, Isuzu added the optional 3.5-liter V6 gasoline direct injection (GDI) engine with 250 hp (186 kW) and 246 lb⋅ft (334 N⋅m) of torque. Isuzu was the first to offer (GDI) in a vehicle priced under US$100,000. The Rodeo weighs in at a little over 1,700 kg (3,800 lb), with an EPA estimated gas mileage for 2007 of 16 mpg_{‑US} (15 L/100 km) city and 22 mpg_{‑US} (11 L/100 km) highway for the two wheel drive model, and 15 mpg_{‑US} (16 L/100 km) city and 20 mpg_{‑US} (12 L/100 km) highway for the four wheel drive model.

The second generation Isuzu Rodeo and its twin, the Honda Passport received a rating of "marginal" in the IIHS frontal offset test conducted at 40 mph (64 km/h) due to a possible injury to the right leg and the head, but dummy movement was reasonably well controlled.

=== Markets ===
==== North America ====
The Amigo made a comeback in the US for 1998 after a three-year hiatus with the second generation model alongside the redesigned Rodeo. The Amigo was originally only available only as a soft top with a five-speed transmission. Standard rear-mounted spare tire, ABS, and removable sunroof rounded out the feature set. Fender flares and special 16-inch wheels were available on the V6 and 4WD models. The Rodeo could also be optioned with a rear-mounted spare tire and its own 16-inch wheels on higher trim packages.

A new 2.2-liter X22SE engine built by Holden in Australia served as the base engine. Isuzu also offered the 205 hp (153 kW) 6VD1 V6 that produced 214 lb⋅ft (290 N⋅m) of torque at 3000 rpm. Fuel consumption is an estimated 22 mpg_{‑US} (11 L/100 km) highway. From a technical perspective, the Rodeo and Amigo were built with a rigid frame that has eight crossmembers. Front suspension has independent lower and upper arms, with a solid rear axle. The Rodeo and Amigo 4WD models came with a modified Dana 44 rear axle and push-button four-wheel drive. They also had a traditional floor mounted lever for switching from high- to low-range. Underneath, both vehicles came with protective skid plates as a standard feature.

The North American Isuzu Amigo and Isuzu Rodeo were built at the Subaru Isuzu Automotive, Inc. assembly plant in Lafayette, Indiana.

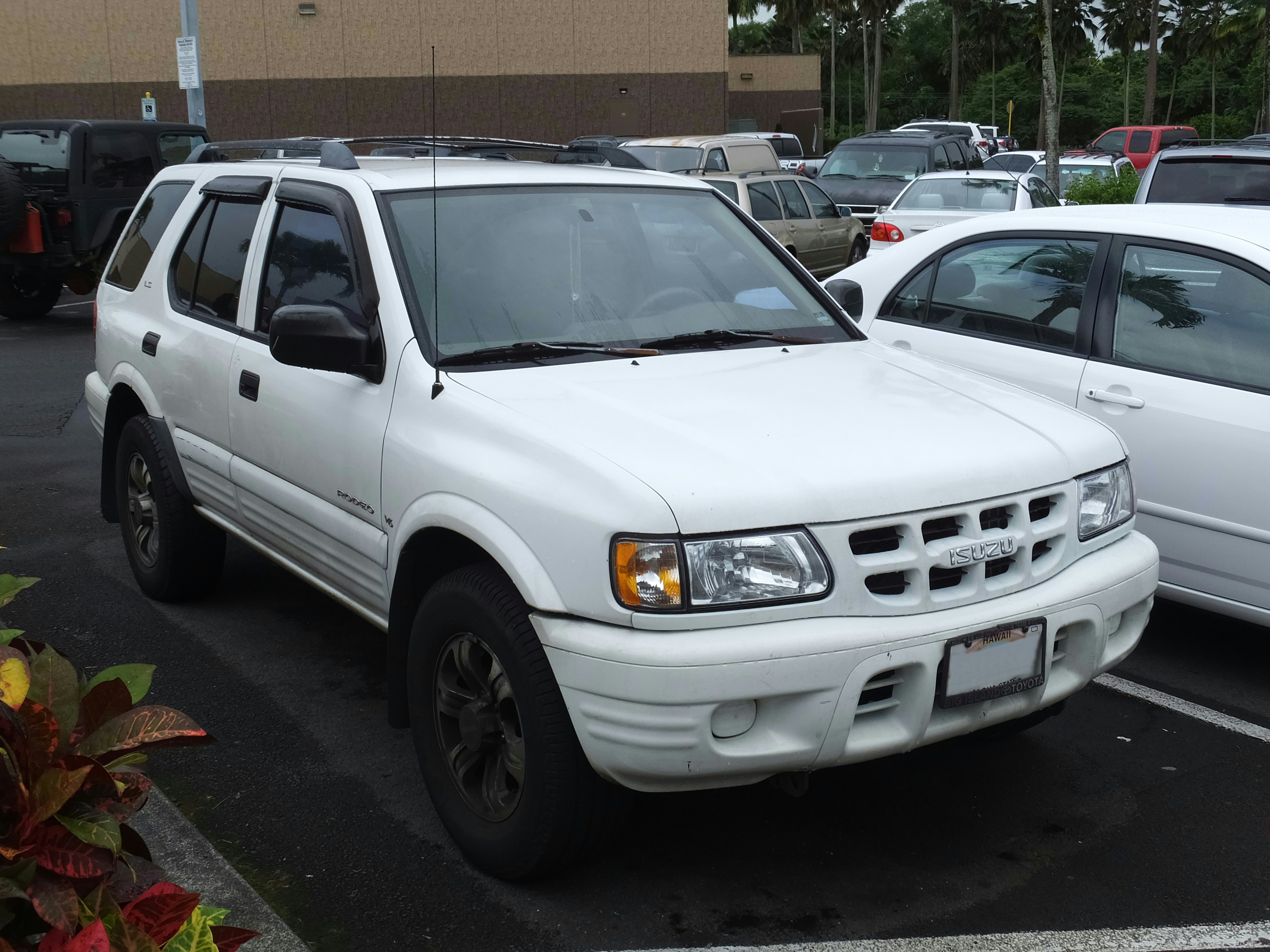
2001–2002 Isuzu Rodeo LS 4WD (US)

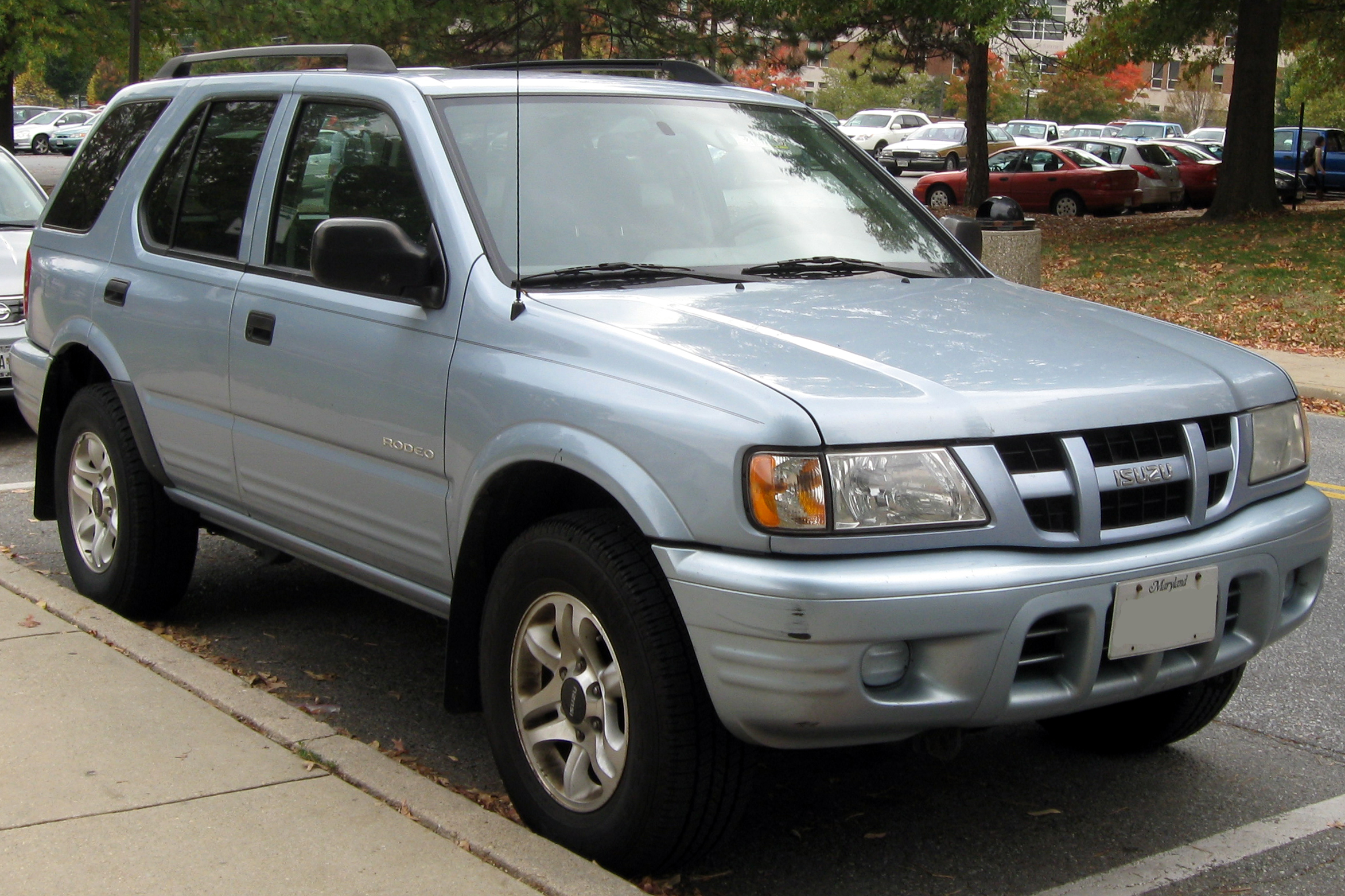

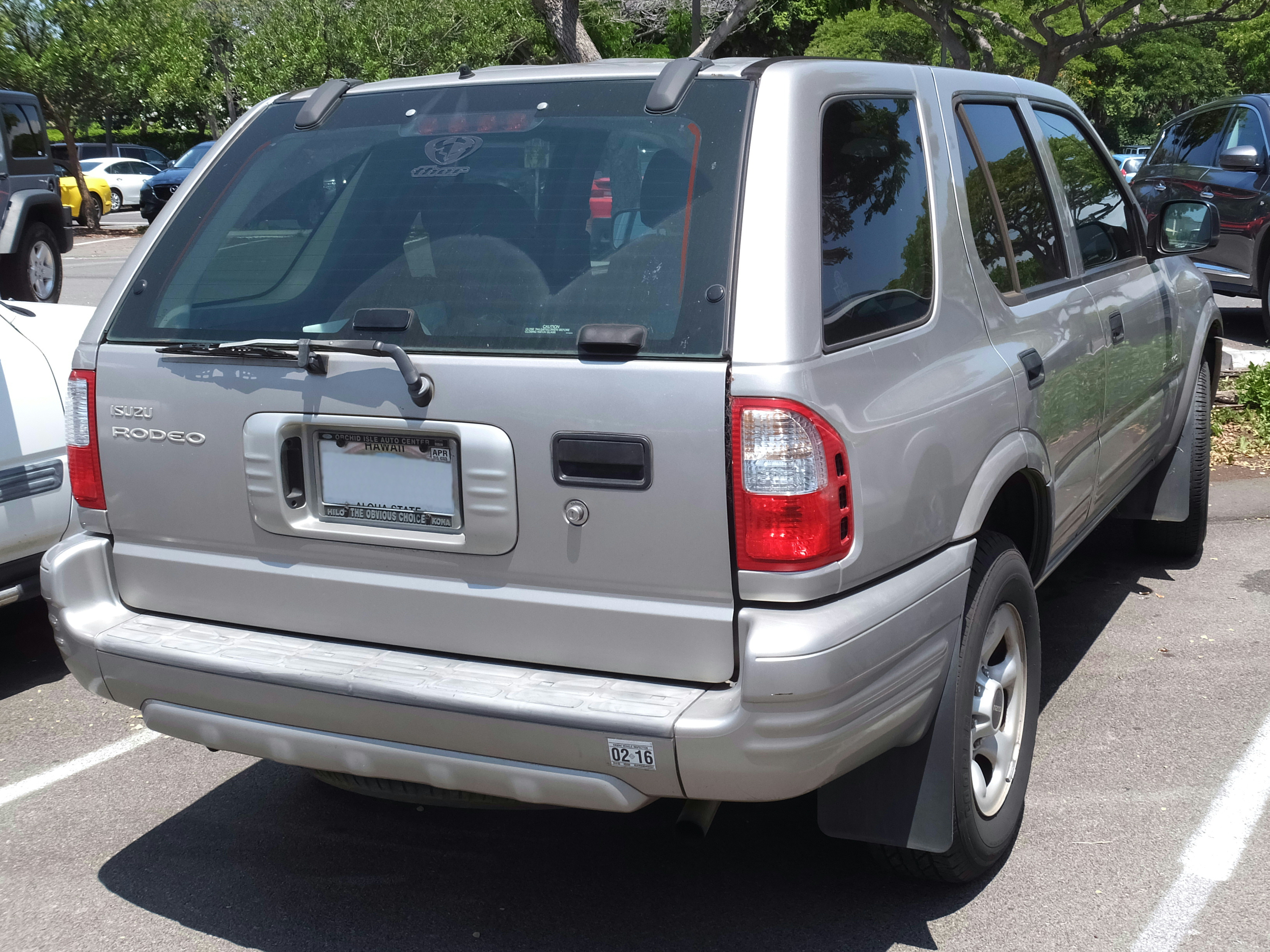
2003–2004 Isuzu Rodeo (US)

- 1998: Second generation Rodeo and Amigo debut.
- 1999: The Amigo gains a hardtop version and an optional automatic transmission. The Amigo logo is changed to block letters to better match the Rodeo and other Isuzu models.
- 2000: The Rodeo and Amigo receive a visual refresh with beefier bumpers, new headlights, tail lights, and grille designs. On the inside, new seats and seat fabrics are introduced. The Amigo gets its own unique grille, light gray bumpers with faux bumper guard, matching light gray fender flares, and black-trimmed headlights. For the five-door Rodeo, adjustable shock absorbers were new this year and 16-inch tires became standard on all models. Cruise control was now standard on V6 Rodeos, and an automatic transmission became standard on the LSE edition. A new Intelligent Suspension Control featuring a dashboard button to adjust shock damping between sport and normal settings became standard on the LSE and optional on LS models. The Honda Passport did not get the adjustable-shock system. A new Ironman package debuted for the LS, marking Isuzu's sponsorship of the Ironman triathlon competition. The package included white or black paint over gray lower body panels, crossbars for the roof rack, and special graphics.
- 2001: In celebration of Isuzu's 85th anniversary, an Anniversary Edition was added, along with a revised Ironman Package. The Amigo is renamed the Rodeo Sport.
- 2002: Last model year for Rodeo sales in Canada, as a result of Isuzu withdrawing from Canada after the 2002 model year. This is also the last year for the Honda Passport.
- 2003: New grille and headlights debut; as well as a revised dash and steering wheel. Last year for the Rodeo Sport. Halfway through the 2003 model year Isuzu switched to the Aisin AW30-40LS automatic transmission. This resulted in 4WD models losing their physical shifter and gaining a dash mounted knob to engage high and low-range.
- 2004: The Rodeo Sport (three-door model) is discontinued as well as the four-cylinder engine on the Rodeo. However, a new optional 3.5-liter 250 hp (186 kW) engine debuts. Added midyear was a standard tire-pressure monitor.

In October 2010, the U.S. National Highway Traffic Safety Administration (NHTSA) recalled 1998–2002 Rodeos, 2002 Isuzu Axioms, and 1998–2002 Honda Passports due to corrosion of the vehicle's frame in the vicinity of the rear suspension. Vehicles without corrosion in the affected area would be treated with an anti-corrosion compound. Vehicles with more severe corrosion would have a reinforcement bracket installed. In some cases, corrosion was so severe that repairs could not be made, resulting in Isuzu and Honda purchasing vehicles from the owners. The final MU rolled of the assembly line on June 5, 2004.

==== Europe ====
In the United Kingdom, the second generation Isuzu MU and Wizard were sold as the Vauxhall Frontera (five-door) and Vauxhall Frontera Sport (three-door). In continental Europe it was sold as the Opel Frontera (five-door) and Opel Frontera Sport (three-door).

After General Motors took full control over the IBC Vehicles factory in 1998, the Frontera production line was planned to be transferred to General Motors' Vauxhall plant in Ellesmere Port. However, with the closure of the Vauxhall Luton plant the decision to move was reversed. In 1998 the new model series was introduced with a choice of 2.2- petrol, 2.2-liter diesel (X22DTH) and 3.2-liter V6 petrol engines. Further modifications were carried out on the diesel engine post-2001, with the final version to be fitted in the marque being the 2.2-liter (Y22) version. This model met the Euro 3 Emissions standard.

The Frontera was discontinued from production at IBC Luton in 2005 (the final models in the UK were produced in Olympus trim). In Australia and New Zealand, the Holden Frontera was replaced by a Holden badged version of the Chevrolet Captiva model range, while in Europe it was replaced by the Opel Antara, that was also available as a Vauxhall.

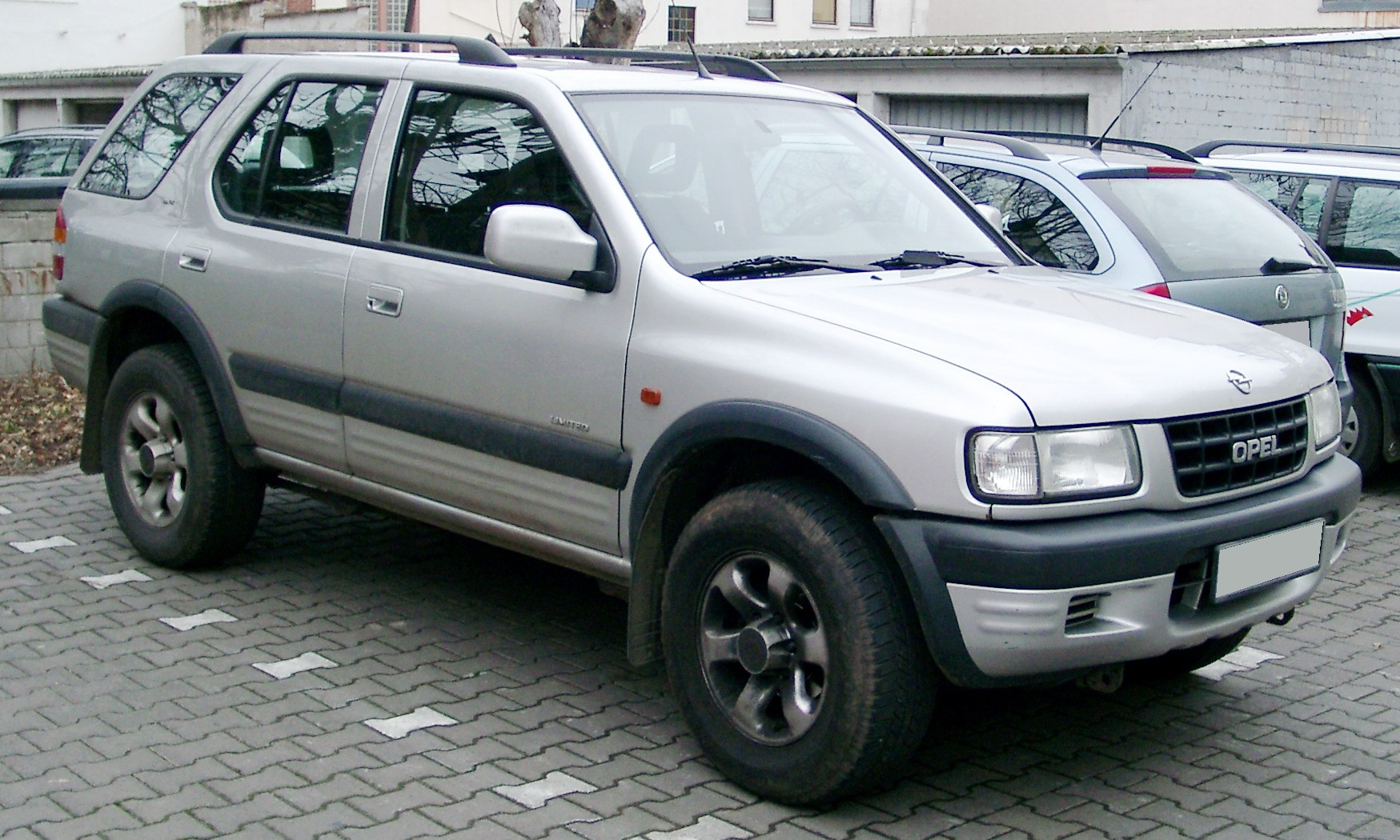
Opel Frontera (Europe)

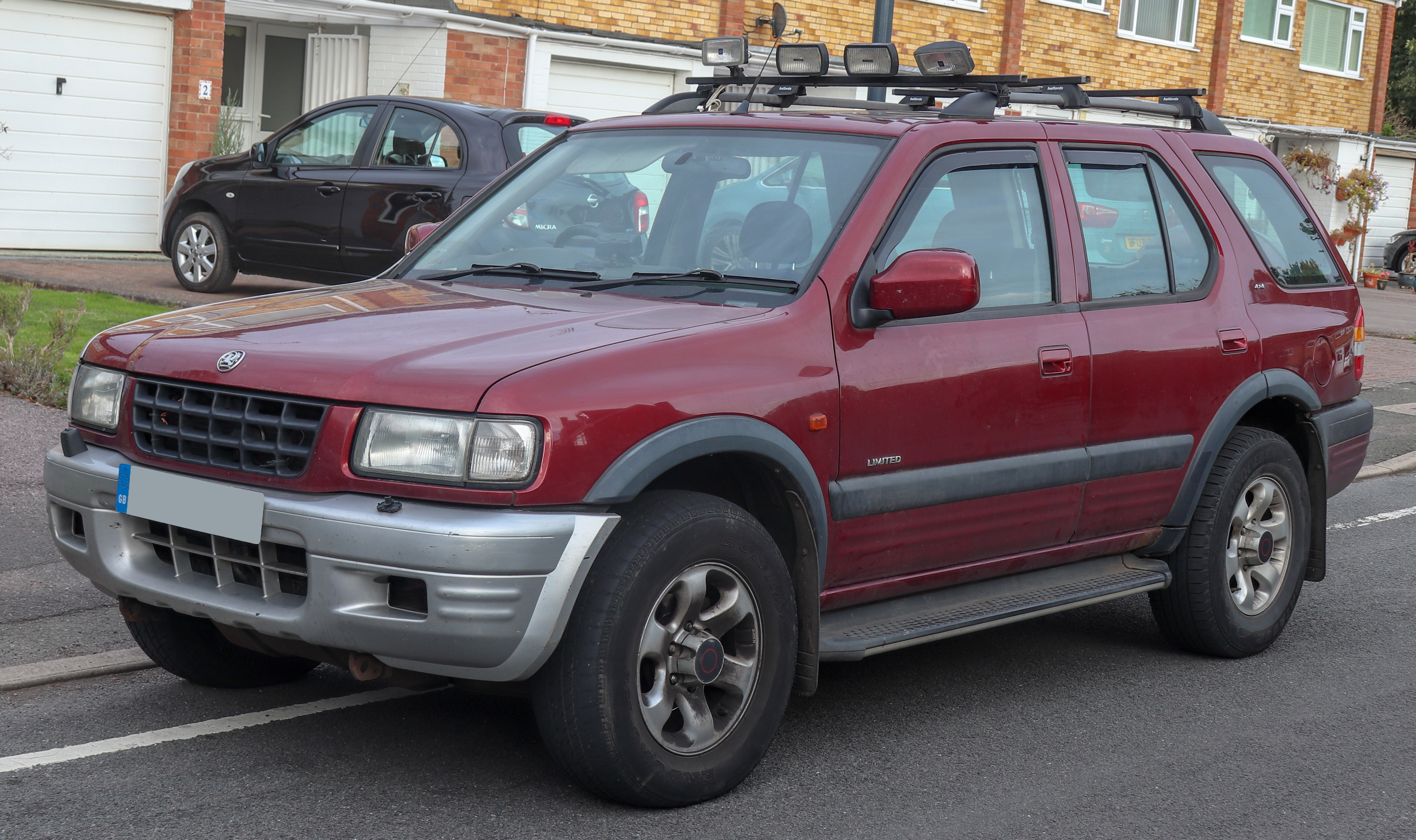
Vauxhall Frontera (UK)

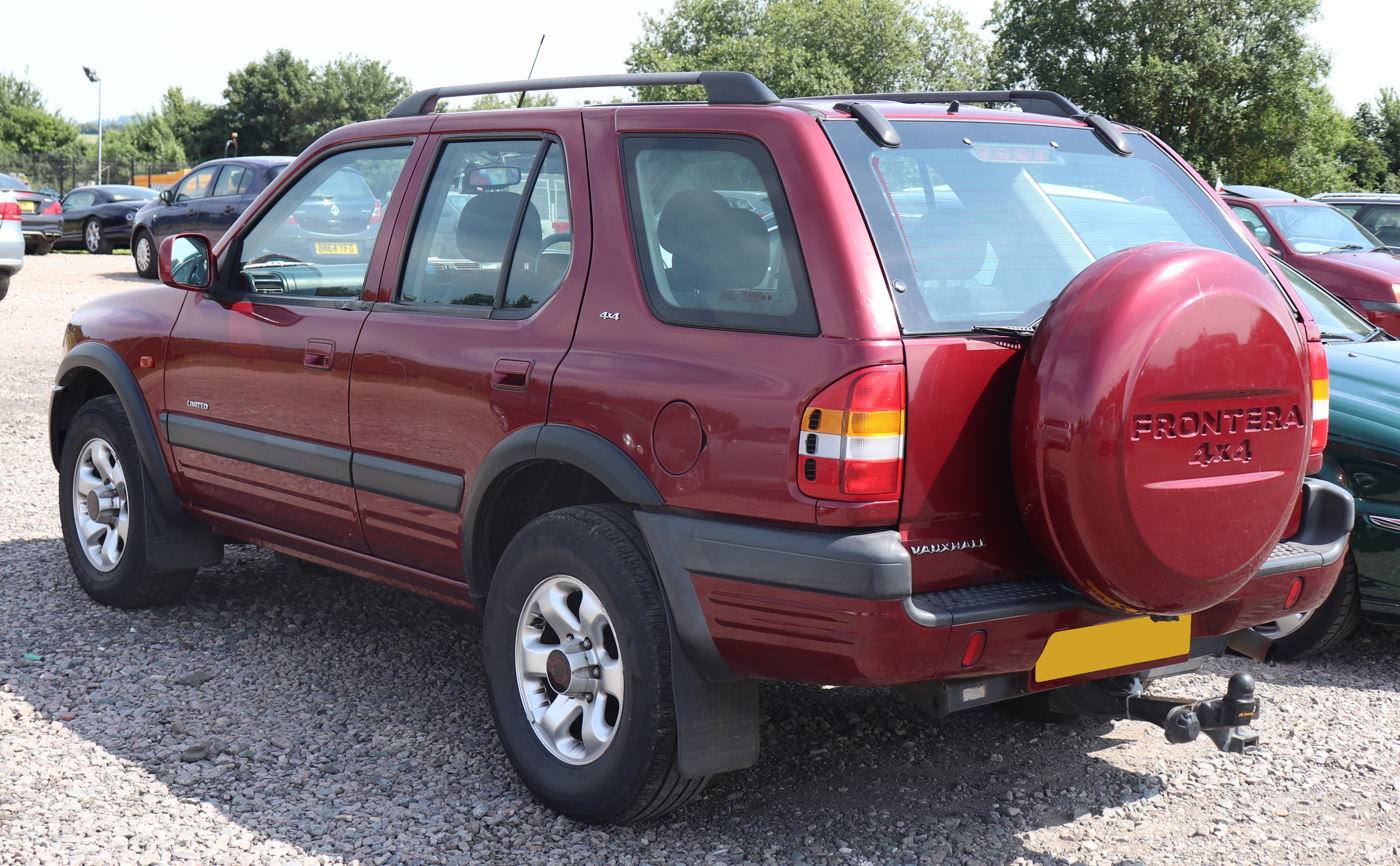
Vauxhall Frontera (UK)

==== Australia ====
Holden in Australia and New Zealand also retailed the second generation model from February 1999 as the UE or MX series Frontera. This time, both three- and five-door bodies were offered—now produced in the US. The five-door models had the 3.2-liter V6 engine rated at 151 kW (202 hp) and 290 N⋅m (214 lbf⋅ft) with optional automatic transmission, whilst the three-door Frontera Sport retained a four-cylinder engine and manual transmission only. Although the Frontera Sport came in just one specification, the five-door wagon offered base, S and SE trims. Holden facelifted the model in 2000 with a revised front grille and front bumper, reshaped headlamps and new taillamp lenses. In late 2001, a second upgrade arrived, bringing reductions in engine noise, the fitment of an electronic throttle, a change to the SE model's ABS calibration to bring improvements to dirt road performance, and several interior upgrades. Holden discontinued the Frontera Sport in June 2002. The five-door wagon continued until 2003, but it was ultimately semi-replaced with the Adventra that year.

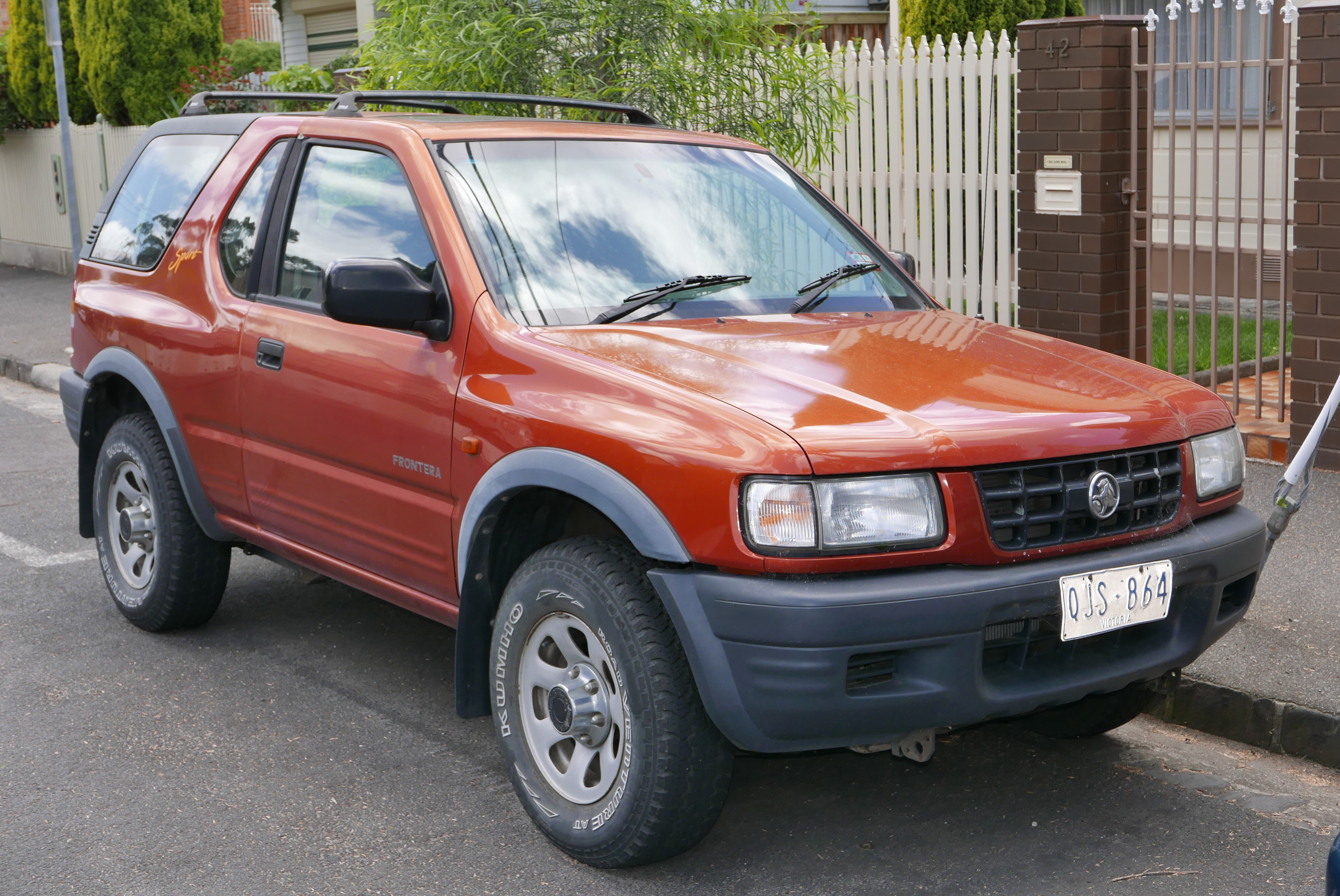
Holden Frontera Sport 3-door

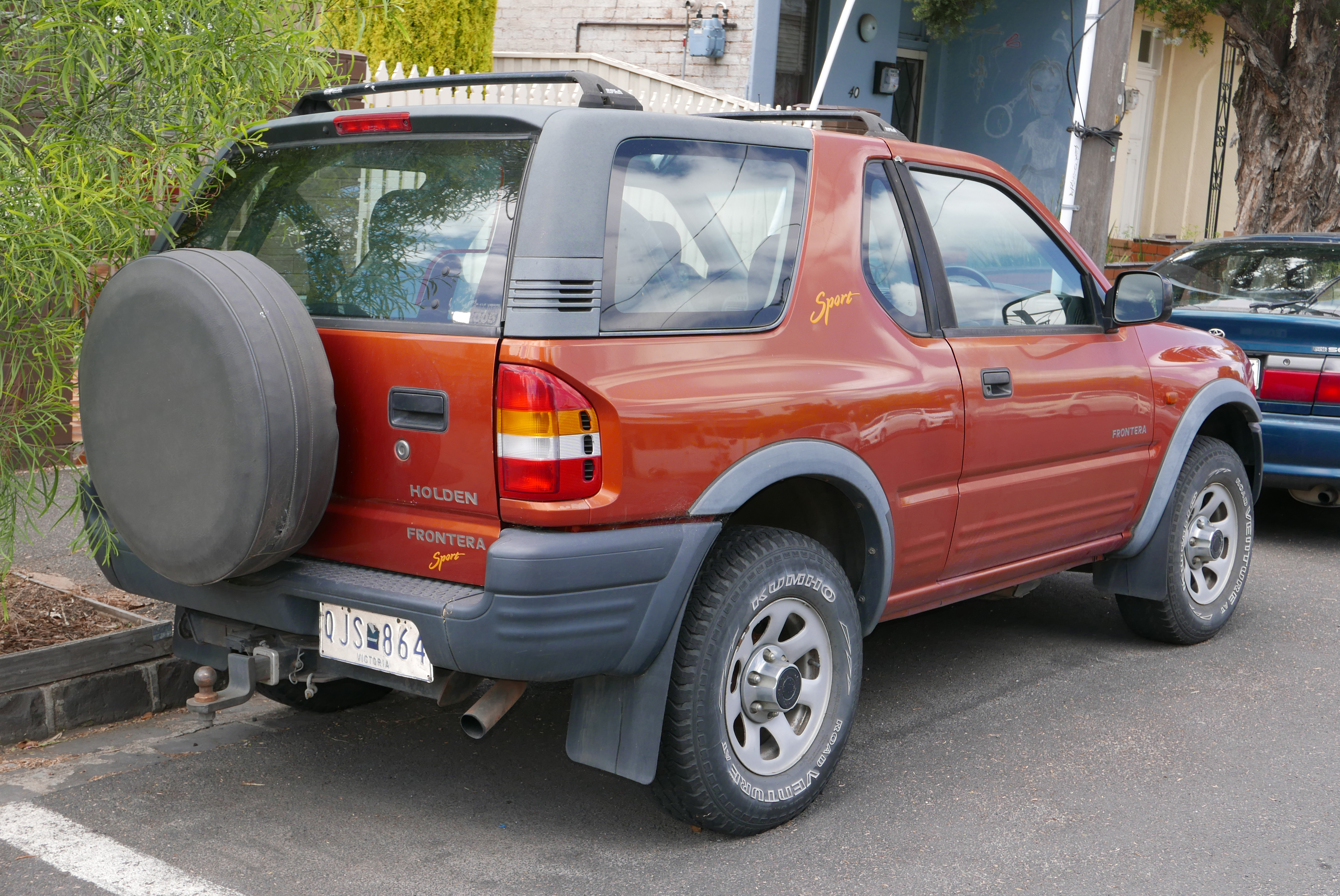
Holden Frontera Sport 3-door
