= Vauxhall Frontera =

Vauxhall Frontera may refer to:

- Vauxhall Frontera (1991–2004), an SUV produced in the UK based on the Isuzu MU
- Vauxhall Frontera (2024), a petrol and electric B-segment crossover SUV

== See also ==
- Opel Frontera
