= Isuzu Rodeo =

The Isuzu Rodeo is an automotive nameplate that was used by the Japanese automobile manufacturer Isuzu between 1988 and 2004. Isuzu has utilized the "Rodeo" name on two different vehicles—a compact pickup truck sold in Japan, and a midsize SUV offered in North America.

Prior to its establishment as a stand-alone model, the "Rodeo" title had previously suffixed four-wheel drive versions of the Japanese market Isuzu Faster (rear-wheel drive) pickup from 1978. These vehicles, titled "Isuzu Faster Rodeo" spanned two generations. It was not until the third iteration, offered between 1988 and 1994, that the firm simplified the name of four-wheel drive models to "Isuzu Rodeo". Moreover, in Japan from 1981, the name "Isuzu Bighorn Rodeo" was used on the SUV that Isuzu shortly abbreviated to "Isuzu Bighorn"—known as the "Isuzu Trooper" in most international markets.

Isuzu in North America deployed the "Rodeo" name in 1990 for the 1991 model year to a five-door SUV sold in the Japanese market as the Isuzu Wizard. Isuzu North America also offered a three-door version under the name Isuzu Amigo, sold as the Isuzu MU in Japan. A second generation of the SUV was released in 1998 for the 1998 model year, with the three-door Amigo becoming the "Rodeo Sport" in 2000 for the 2001 model year. Production of both SUVs concluded in 2004. Slightly altered rebadged versions of the Rodeo were sold as the Honda Passport in the United States market until 2002. The Isuzu Rodeo got a slight redesign after 2002, the speedometer and some of the interior was updated.

Isuzu Japan had Yokohama Motor Sales manufacture from 1990-1993 a four-berth camper on the TFS55H LWB chassis platform. With an over all length of 6150 mm, this was a popular 4WD version which gave offroad accessibility and comfort. This option only came in 2.8 litre diesel engine (4JB1T) option and 5-speed manual with low/high transferbox. There was no automatic transmission offered.

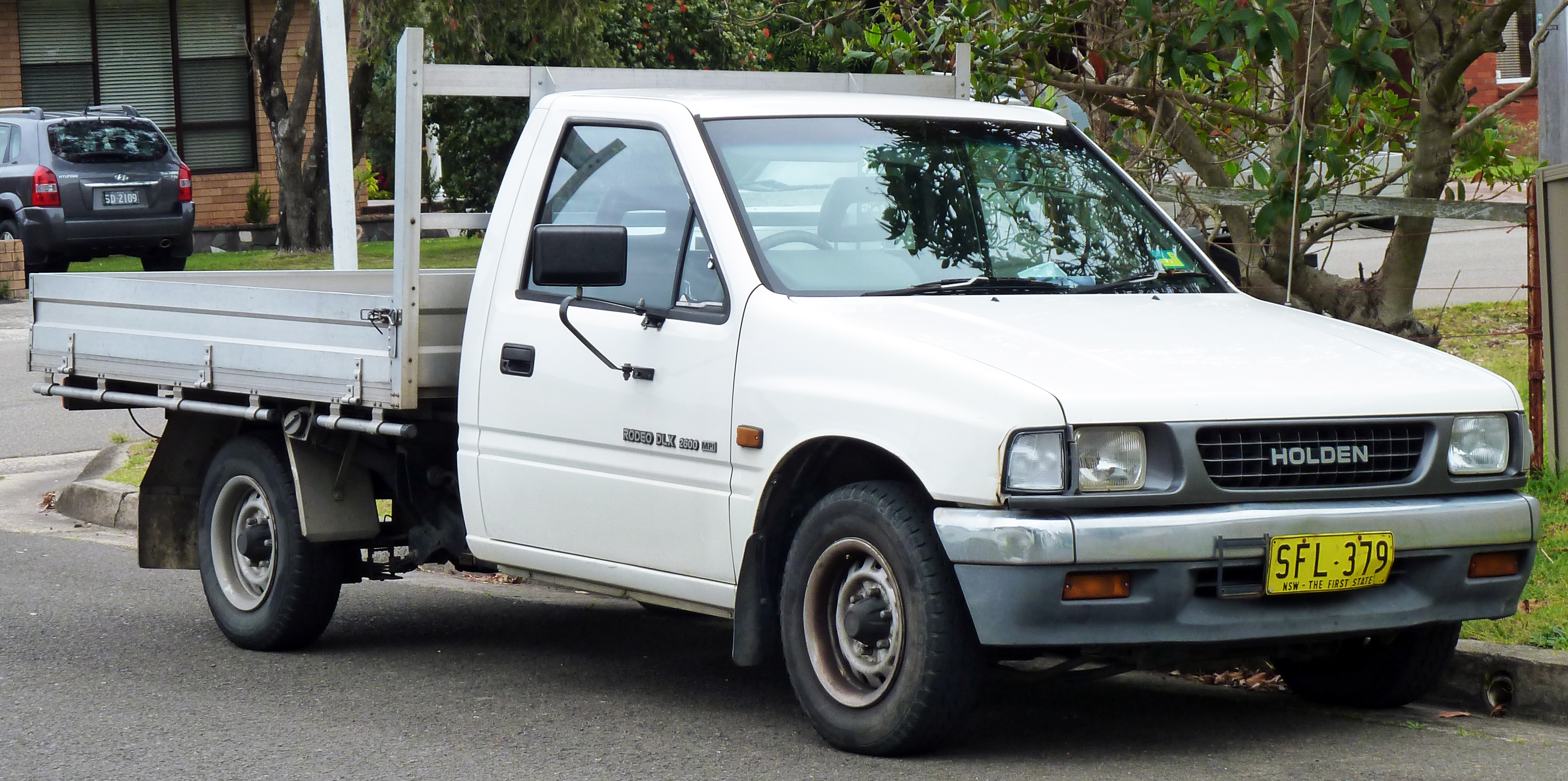
Compact pickup

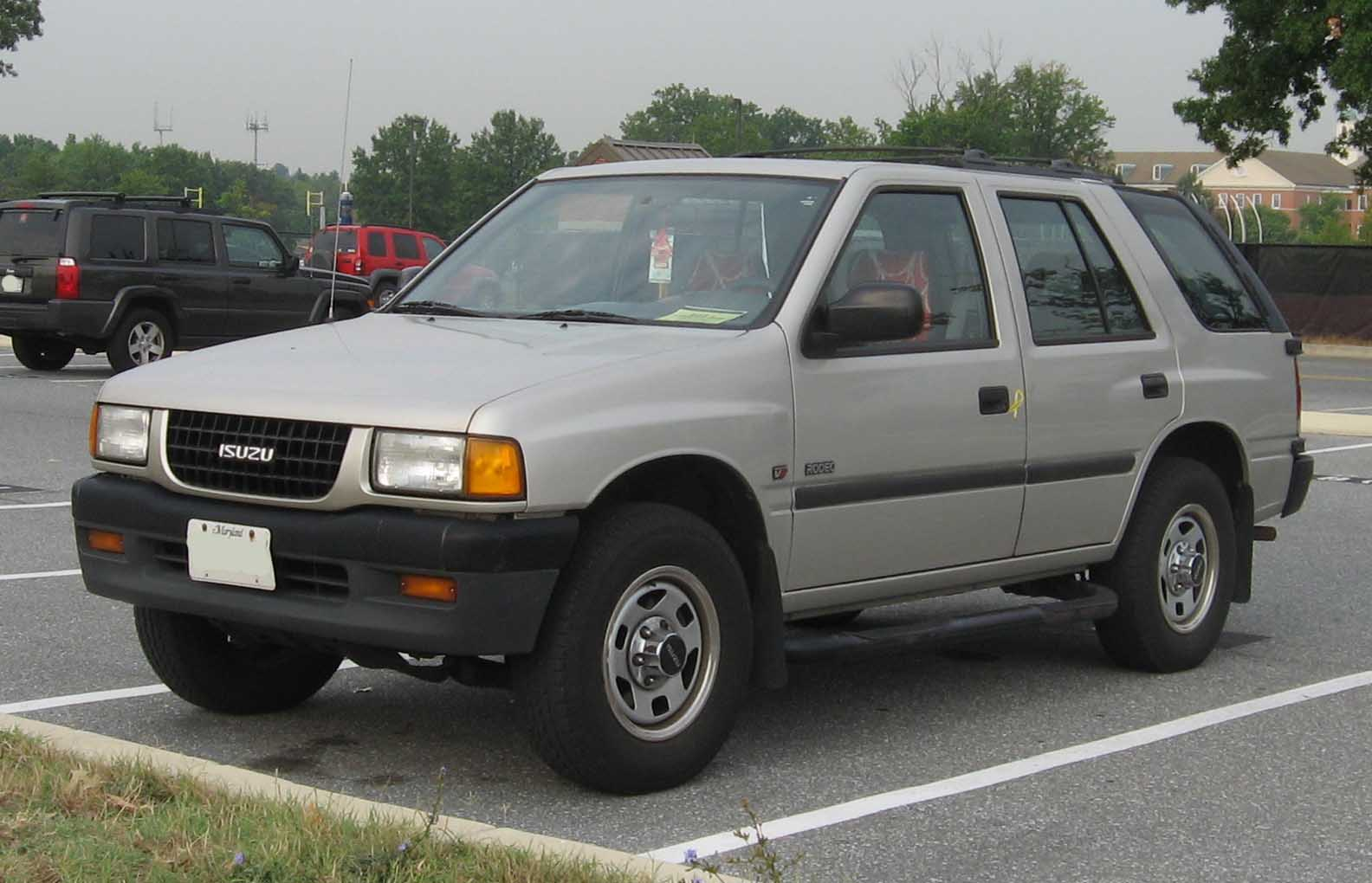
Mid-size SUV (first generation)

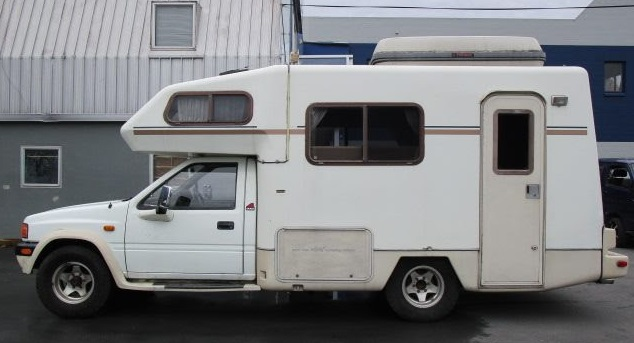
Isuzu Rodeo Camper TFS55H

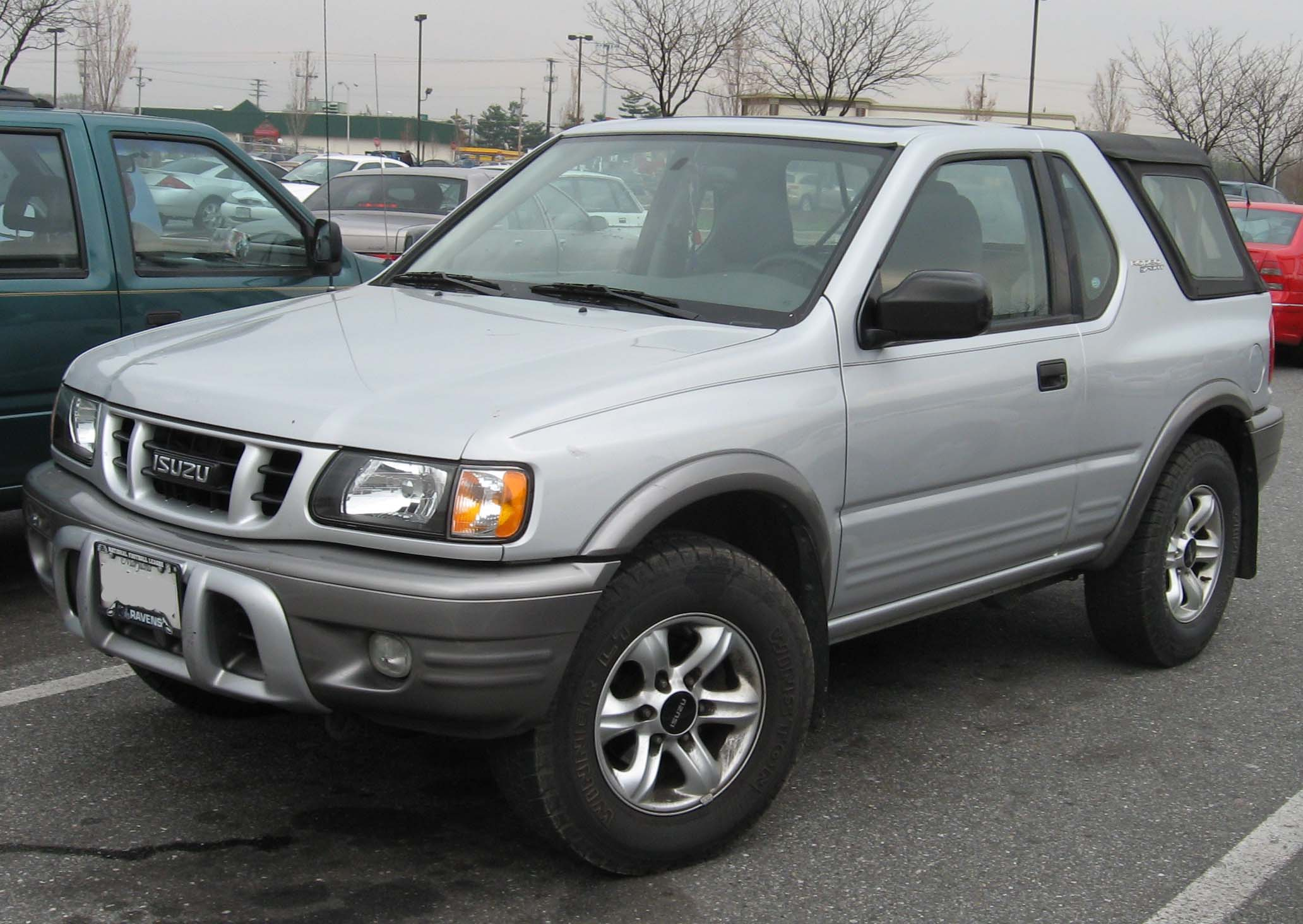
Isuzu Rodeo sport/amigo 1998-2004 2nd Gen

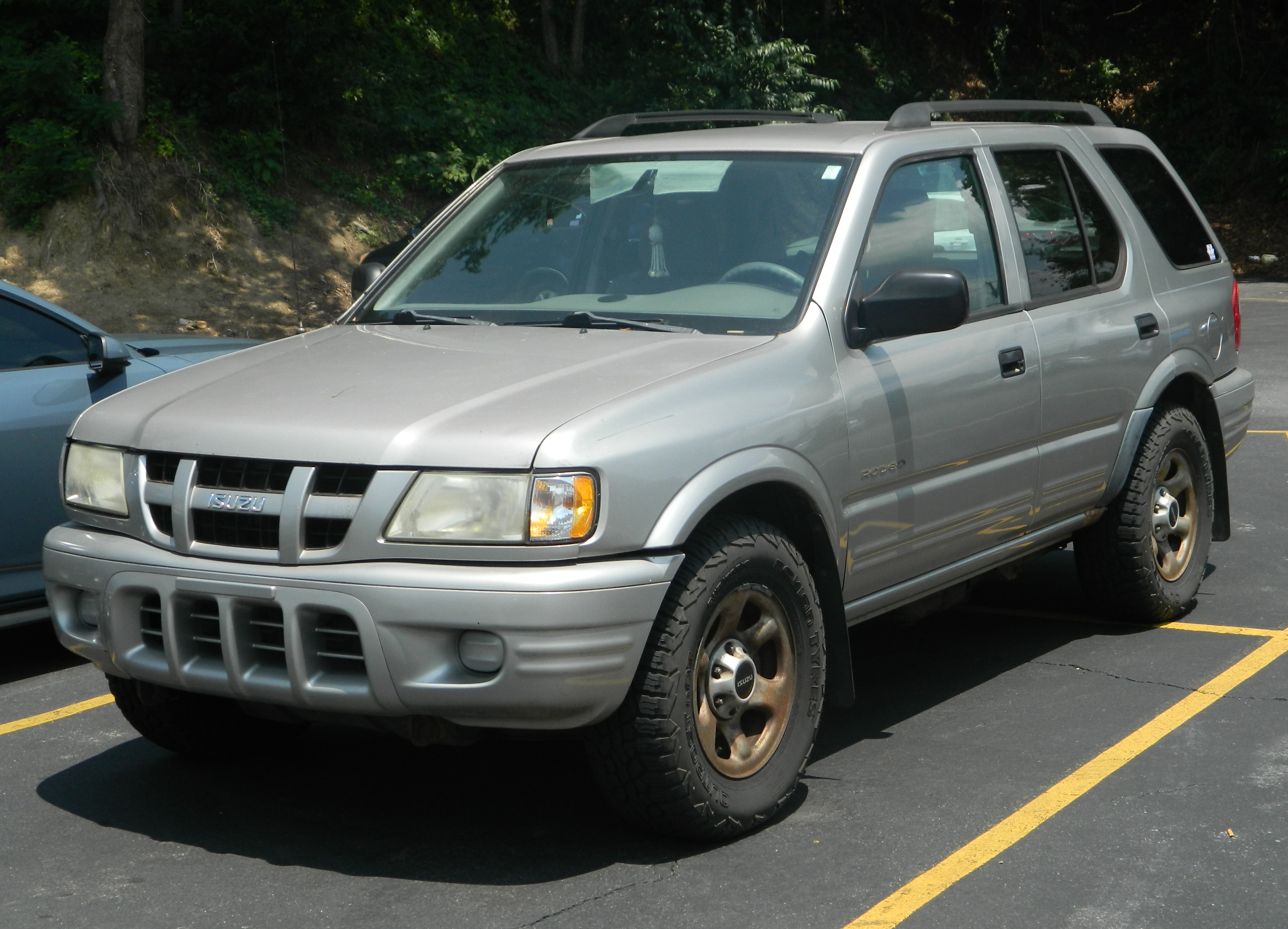
1998-2004 Isuzu Rodeo 2nd Gen

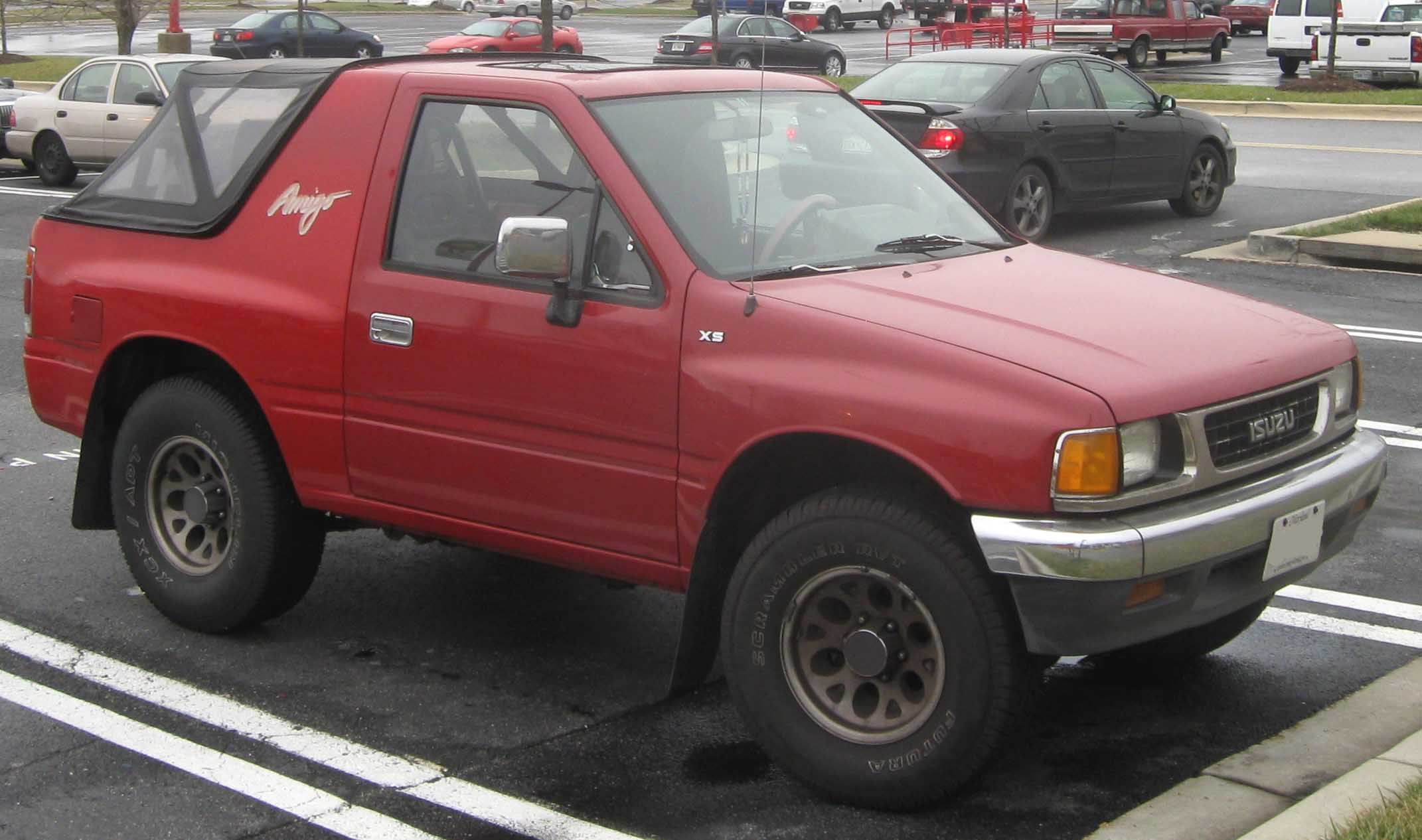
1st Gen Isuzu Amigo
