= American Honda Motor Company =

American automobile distributor

Coordinates: 33.8378194°N 118.3152342°W

American Honda Motor Company, Inc.

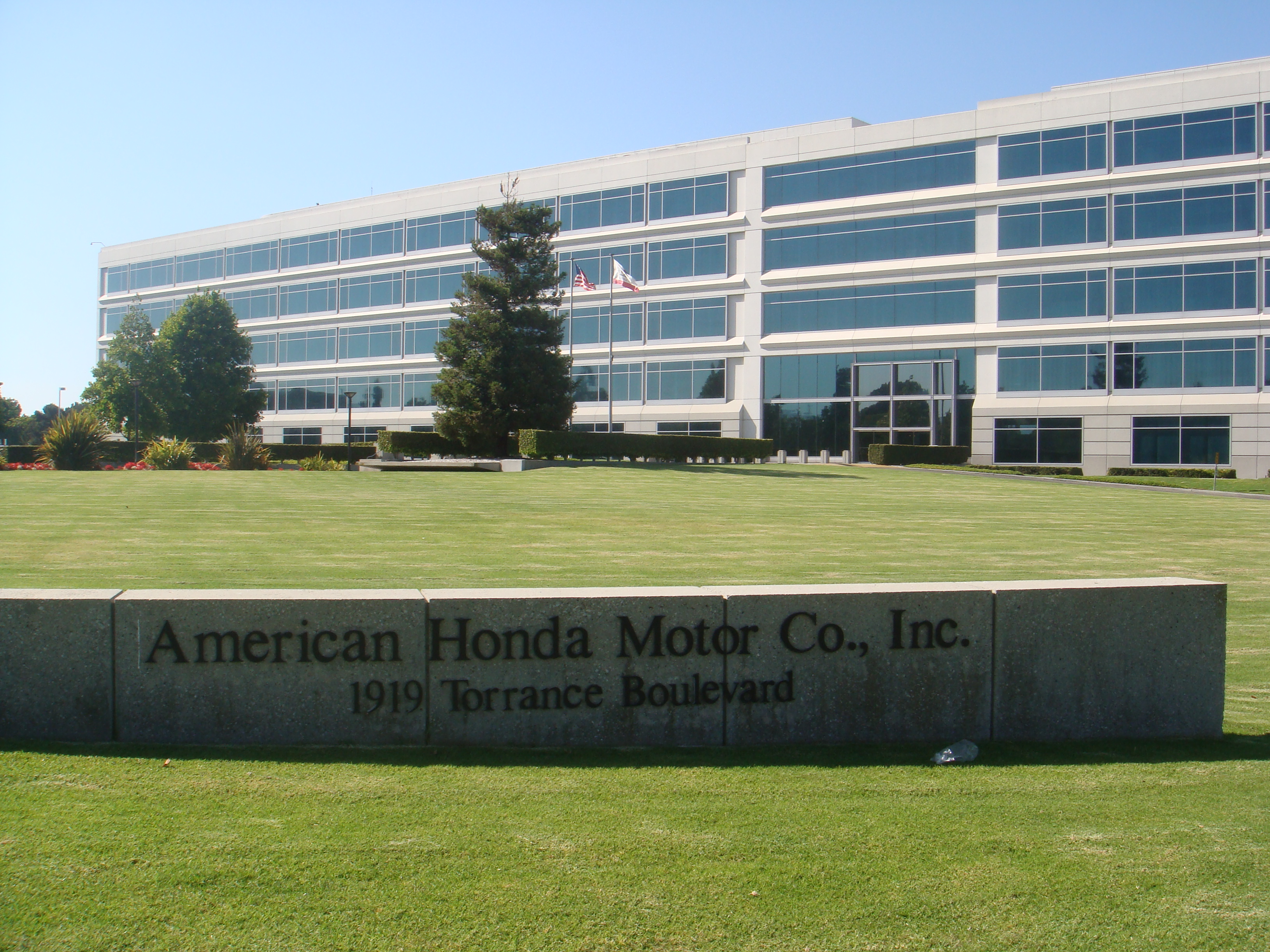
- American Honda headquarters in Torrance, California
- Type: Subsidiary
- Industry: Automotive
- Founded: 1959; 67 years ago in Los Angeles
- Headquarters: Torrance, California, United States
- Area served: North America
- Key people: Eiji Fujimura (president & CEO)
- Owner: Honda
- Divisions: Acura
- Website: honda.com

The American Honda Motor Company, Inc. (sometimes abbreviated as AHM) is the North American subsidiary of Japanese Honda Motor Company. Founded in 1959, the company combines product sales, service and coordinating functions of Honda in North America, and is responsible for distribution, marketing and sales of Honda and Acura brand automobiles, Honda Powersports products (motorcycles, scooters and all-terrain vehicles), Honda Power Equipment products (garden tools, generators, and lawn mowers), Honda Engines products, Honda Marine engines, and the HondaJet aircraft.

As of 2025, Honda-brand automobile models include the Accord, Civic, CR-V, HR-V, Odyssey, Passport, Pilot and Ridgeline. Acura-brand models are the Integra, ADX, MDX, RDX, and ZDX. Honda claims several firsts for a Japanese car maker in the United States. The company was the first to create a subsidiary to market and sell its vehicles in the country, and the first to manufacture automobiles in North America.

American Honda Motor Co., Inc., Honda's first overseas subsidiary opened in Los Angeles in 1959 which was unusual for the time, as other foreign auto companies typically relied on independent distributors.

== History ==
American Honda Motor Co., Inc., Honda's first overseas subsidiary, opened in Los Angeles on June 11, 1959 with capital investment of $250,000 ($2,761,130 in 2025 dollars) and three employees. The creation of a subsidiary was unusual for the time, as other foreign auto companies typically relied on independent distributors. The headquarters in 1959 were at 4077 West Pico Boulevard in Los Angeles. The office was moved to the nearby suburb of Gardena at 100 West Alondra in 1963. In 1990, they relocated to 1919 Torrance Boulevard in Torrance, California, in the Los Angeles metropolitan area. The Honda headquarters have 101 acres (41 ha) of space.

In 1960, the first full year of operations, American Honda sold fewer than 2,000 motorcycles through three product lines: the Dream, Benly and Honda 50 (Super Cub). The following year, Honda established 500 motorcycle dealers and spent $150,000 on advertising in regions where it operated ($1,632,452 in 2025 dollars). Honda's expansion into new U.S. markets was undertaken one region at a time over a five-year period, starting on the West Coast and moving east, creating new demand for motorcycles.

Sales in the U.S. did not increase notably until 1963, when the company launched its "You meet the nicest people on a Honda" advertising campaign, the first of its scale to position motorcycles to mainstream Americans. By the end of the year, Honda had sold more than 100,000 units in the U.S., more than all other motorcycle manufacturers combined. Expansion at this time led the company to move to a new headquarters facility in Gardena, California, in September 1963, and total unit sales in 1964 represented nearly half of the U.S. motorcycle market.

Honda had an easier time expanding in the U.S. than in Japan, where Honda first began as a motorcycle manufacturer, only later entering the automobile market in competition with other established competitors including Toyota and Nissan. By 1983, Honda had 805 dealerships in the U.S. In the early 1990s, Honda sold two cars in the U.S. for every one car it sold in Japan. In 1990, American Honda took up residence in its current headquarters facility in Torrance, California. Following the death of founder Soichiro Honda in 1991, the company's global operations were re-organized, forming four regional operations including North America.

As of 2018, Honda employed more than 31,000 associates in the U.S. with a payroll of $2.5 billion. Another 159,000 workers are employed at authorized dealerships in the U.S., and tens of thousands more work for the company's 607 U.S. original equipment (OEM) suppliers.

== Vehicles ==
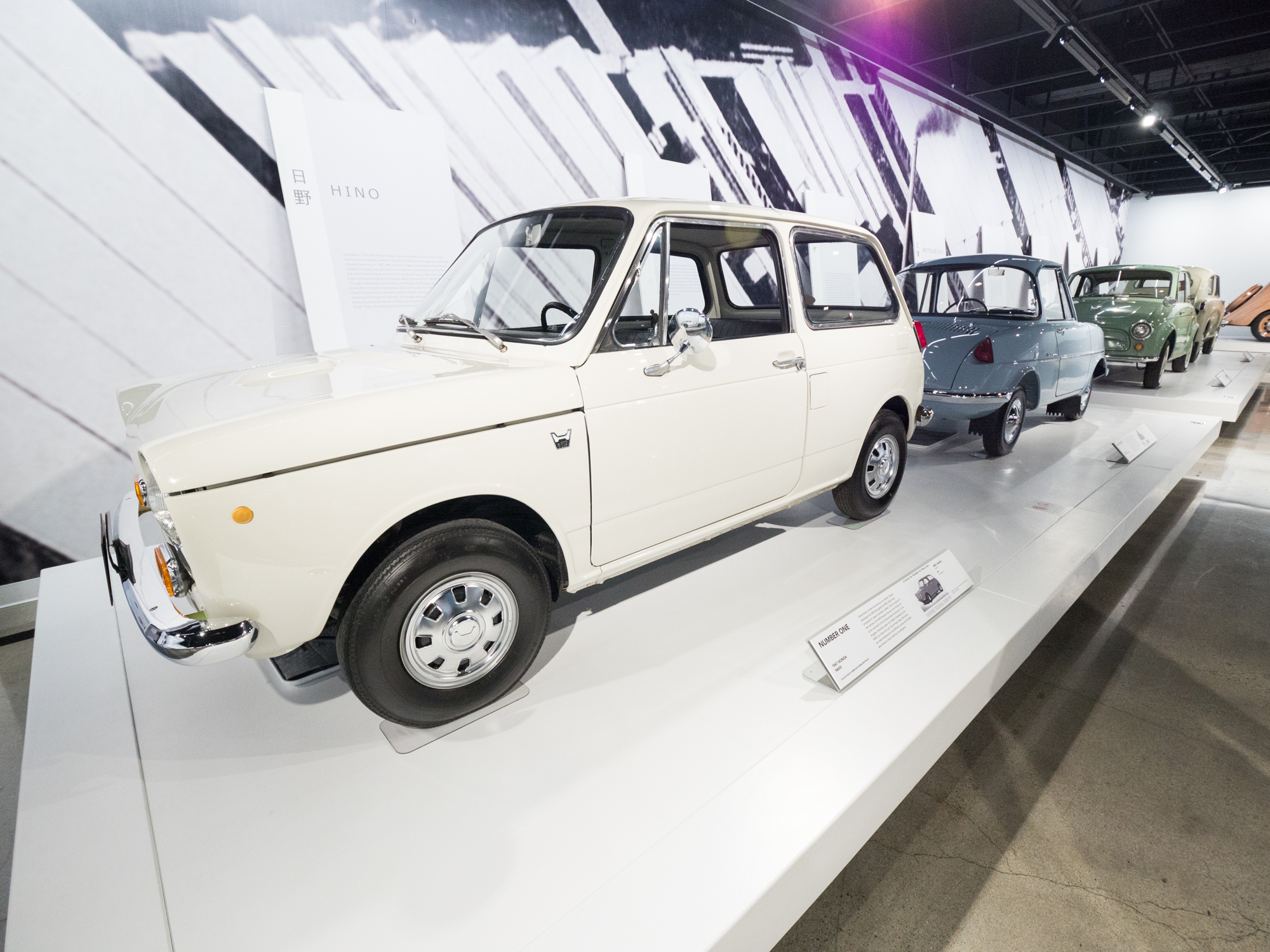
Honda N600 sedan, serial number 1000001 at Petersen Automotive Museum

Honda first introduced passenger cars to the North American market in 1970 with sales of the Honda N600 sedan through 32 dealers in the western United States. The first Honda car sold in the United States was sold and retired at the same dealership at Manly Honda, in Santa Rosa, California; however, sales of the vehicle and subsequent model, the Z600 coupe, only reached 20,000 units in 1972. During the 1970s energy crisis, however, lightweight, fuel-efficient cars experienced a surge in demand. The Honda Civic, introduced in 1973, became popular in the United States, leading a significant expansion of Honda into the American market.

By 1976, the company had 630 automobile dealers, and Honda followed the Civic with the Accord hatchback, which became the best-selling passenger car in the United States from 1990 to 1992. In 1977, the company partnered with J.D. Power and Associates to conduct a survey of its U.S. dealers and customers concerning their satisfaction with Honda. The initiative led to the creation of the J.D. Power and Associates Customer Satisfaction Index.

Following the Accord's success with middle-class customers, Honda became the first Japanese automaker to enter the luxury automobile market, in 1986, when it launched the Acura brand. In 1987, Acura became America's best-selling import luxury nameplate with its Integra and Legend product lines. To differentiate the brand from its Honda line, the company created a second, completely new dealer network, requiring that Acura dealerships be located a minimum of 10 miles (16 km) from existing Honda outlets, and requiring each to invest $3 million to get started. Nearby at 19988 Van Ness Ave, Honda maintains the American Honda Museum collection, which is not open to the general public, but can be viewed by appointment for group visits.

=== Environmental vehicles ===
Honda has also had several firsts in the area of advanced environmental vehicles. In 1974, the Civic CVCC was introduced as the first car to meet 1970 U.S. Clean Air Act requirements without the need for a catalytic converter and using either regular or unleaded gasoline, and was also rated #1 in fuel economy by the United States Environmental Protection Agency in its first ranking of America's most fuel-efficient automobiles.

In December 1999, it launched the Honda Insight, America's first gas-electric hybrid car. It later released the Civic Hybrid, the first application of hybrid technology to an existing, mass-produced automobile; and the Accord Hybrid, the U.S. market's first V-6 hybrid car. A second-generation Insight hybrid was launched in 2009, followed in 2010 by the CR-Z, a two-passenger car.

American Honda has also been active in the deployment of low-emissions vehicles in the U.S., including the first gasoline-powered vehicles to meet California's Low-Emission Vehicle (LEV), Ultra-Low Emission Vehicle (ULEV), and Super Ultra-Low Emission Vehicle (SULEV) exhaust emissions requirements.

As of 2011, Honda is the sole automaker in America marketing a mass-produced natural gas vehicle, the Civic GX, which is produced at its plant in Greensburg, Indiana. The Civic GX was recognized by the American Council for an Energy-Efficient Economy (ACEEE) as the "greenest vehicle" in 2010; representing the seventh consecutive year receiving this distinction.

Honda offered the first fuel cell electric vehicle to retail customers in the United States, with its first generation FCX vehicle in December 2002. In 2008, Honda introduced an all-new FCX Clarity, a fuel cell sedan, which in 2010 was in the hands of more than two dozen retail customers based on lease sale agreements.

In January 2010, the company began operating its third version of a prototype solar-powered hydrogen refueling station for fuel cell electric vehicles on its Torrance, California, campus. The station utilized Honda developed and manufactured thin-film solar cells to provide energy for the reformation of hydrogen from water via electrolysis, producing enough hydrogen to power a fuel cell electric vehicle 10,000 miles per year via a daily, eight-hour overnight fill.

=== Products ===
Model	Class	Propulsion
Accord	Mid-size sedan	Gasoline
Accord	Mid-size sedan	Hybrid
Civic	Compact sedan	Gasoline
Civic	Compact sedan	Hybrid
Civic	Compact hatchback	Gasoline
Civic	Compact hatchback	Hybrid
Civic Si	Sport compact sedan	Gasoline
Civic Type R	Sport compact hatchback	Gasoline
CR-V	Compact crossover SUV	Gasoline
CR-V	Compact crossover SUV	Hybrid
HR-V	Compact crossover SUV	Gasoline
Odyssey	Minivan	Gasoline
Passport	Mid-size crossover SUV	Gasoline
Pilot	Mid-size crossover SUV	Gasoline
Ridgeline	Mid-size pickup truck	Gasoline
Prelude	Sport compact coupe	Hybrid

== Manufacturing ==
In the 1980s, Honda established its own automobile plants in the U.S., becoming the first Japanese automaker to build cars in the U.S. Honda already had begun producing motorcycles in the U.S., in 1979 in Marysville, Ohio and in 1982, Honda began producing Accord sedans at its first U.S. auto plant, also in Marysville. The 1,000,000-square-foot (93,000 m^{2}) plant cost nearly $300 million to build. As of 2010, the plant measured 3,600,000 square feet (330,000 m^{2}) with cumulative capital investment of $3.8 billion.

During the next 10 years, Honda expanded its auto manufacturing presence, and as of 2010, the company was operating nine U.S. plants in six states. Collectively, these plants produce Honda and Acura automobiles, engines and transmissions, as well as Honda all-terrain vehicles and Honda power equipment products. In 2010, Honda America continued construction on two new factories in North Carolina, one for the production of the HondaJet very light jet, in Greensboro, and a second to produce its GE Honda HF120 turbofan engines, in Burlington.

On November 9, 2026, Honda announced plans to invest US$3 billion in a new automobile assembly plant in central Ohio to expand production of hybrid vehicles. The plant was expected to begin production in 2029, with annual capacity of 240,000 vehicles and approximately 2,000 new jobs. Planned for a site between the existing Marysville and East Liberty plants, the facility would also be capable of producing conventional internal-combustion. Its addition would increase Honda's annual North American automobile production capacity from 1.67 million to 1.91 million vehicles.

== Research and development ==
Honda established U.S. research and development operations in Southern California in 1975 as Honda Research California, an arm of American Honda Motor, Co., Inc. In 1979, Honda Research of America, Inc. (HRA) was created as a subsidiary of Honda R&D Co., Ltd. As of 2010, the company operates as Honda R&D Americas, Inc. with 14 facilities in North America, including two product research and design studios for Honda and Acura, in Torrance, California, an automobile and motorcycle new-model development center in Raymond, Ohio, and a power equipment research, development and testing center in Swepsonville, North Carolina.

The company's first U.S. development was the 1989 Accord SEi. In the early to mid-1990s, HRA developed a series of derivative models including two generations of Accord Wagon (1991 and 1994), the 1998 Accord Coupe, and the 1997 Acura CL coupe (1997), based heavily on the Accord platform.

In the 2000s (decade), the company created two generations of the Honda Pilot and Acura MDX sport-utility vehicles; three generations of the Acura TL sedan; the Honda Element SUV; the 2006 Honda Ridgeline, Honda's first U.S. pickup truck; and the 2010 Acura ZDX crossover coupe. Both the 2001 MDX and 2006 Ridgeline earned recognition as North American Truck of the Year, as well as Motor Trend SUV of the Year (MDX) and Truck of the Year (Ridgeline), while the Pilot received five consecutive "5 Best Truck" awards from Car and Driver magazine (2003–2007).

In model year 2010, one-third of the Honda and Acura models sold in the U.S. and five of the eight light-trucks were models developed by Honda R&D Americas. In September 2010, the third generation Honda Odyssey minivan was released as a 2011 model, the most recent vehicle developed by the company exclusively in the U.S.

== Motorsports ==
American Honda joined U.S. open-wheel racing competition with its entry into the Championship Auto Racing Teams (CART) series in 1994, following Honda's six consecutive Formula One World Championships from 1986 to 1991. The company, under the auspices of its U.S. racing subsidiary, Honda Performance Development (HPD), captured six Driver's Championships and four Manufacturer's titles, winning 65 of 164 races between 1992 and 2002.

HPD entered the IndyCar Series in 2003 and from 2003 to 2005, Honda teams and drivers achieved 28 victories in 49 races, including the 2004 and 2005 Indianapolis 500s. Honda won the IndyCar Series Manufacturers' Championships in 2004 and 2005, while Honda-powered drivers won the drivers' championships in the same years. In 2006, Honda became the single engine supplier to the IndyCar Series and has committed itself to the series through 2011.

Since 2007, HPD has also provided engines to prototype-class teams in American Le Mans Series sports-car racing, and these engines have scored numerous victories, beginning with an LMP2-class win in Honda's inaugural ALMS race, at Sebring in 2007. HPD was the first manufacturer to score ALMS class wins in both LMP1 and LMP2 on the same weekend with its wins at St. Petersburg in 2009. HPD went on to win LMP1 and LMP2 Manufacturers' Championships for Acura in 2009. In 2010, the company began providing engines and support for sports-car competition in both America and Europe, earning a class win in its inaugural attempt at the 24 Hours of Le Mans.

== Advertising ==
During its history in the United States, Honda has had several taglines and produced a number of noteworthy advertising campaigns. Honda's first advertising slogan, promoting the Honda motorcycle to young families, was "You meet the nicest people on a Honda." The company's slogan for its automobiles from 1977 - 1984 was "We make it simple" (replacing the tagline "What The World Is Coming To" when the Civic was the only automobile marketed). By 1983, Honda's advertising budget, sponsoring National Football League games and other sporting events, rivaled the cost of building its Marysville motorcycle plant. The company has used slogans "A Car Ahead" (1993) and "Simplify" (1996). In September 2007, the company launched its current marketing slogan, "Honda: The Power of Dreams". The early 2010s ad campaign for its automobile lineup opens up with a doorbell sound that recalls the "Honda" choir audio tagline from the 1980s.

In 2009, American Honda released the "Dream the Impossible" documentary series, a collection of 5–8 minute web vignettes that focus on the core philosophies of Honda. Current short films include Failure: The Secret to Success, Kick Out the Ladder and Mobility 2088. They feature Honda employees as well as Danica Patrick, Christopher Guest, Ben Bova, Chee Pearlman, Joe Johnston and Orson Scott Card. The film series plays at dreams.honda.com.

In Southern California, Honda employees from the region appear on commercials titled "Random Acts of Helpfulness" on radio and television in English and Spanish and helped hundreds of families succeed with "Random Acts of Helpfulness".

== See also ==
- History of the Japanese in Los Angeles
