= Lincoln, Alabama =

City in Alabama, United States

- City
- Seal Logo
- Motto: "Come Grow With Us"
- Location of Lincoln in Talladega County, Alabama.
- Coordinates: 33°34′30″N 86°08′42″W
- Country: United States
- State: Alabama
- County: Talladega

Area
  - Total: 25.87 sq mi (67.00 km^{2})
  - Land: 25.67 sq mi (66.49 km^{2})
  - Water: 0.20 sq mi (0.52 km^{2})
- Elevation: 528 ft (161 m)

Population (2020)
  - Total: 6,845
  - Density: 266.7/sq mi (102.96/km^{2})
- Time zone: UTC-6 (Central (CST))
  - Summer (DST): UTC-5 (CDT)
- ZIP code: 35096
- Area codes: 205, 659 256
- FIPS code: 01-43120
- GNIS feature ID: 2404929
- Website: www.lincolnalabama.com

Lincoln is a city in Talladega County, Alabama, United States. It was incorporated in 1911. At the 2020 census, the population was 6,845. It was named for Major General Benjamin Lincoln, who served in the American army during the Revolutionary War.

The Talladega Superspeedway, the International Motorsports Hall of Fame and the Talladega Municipal Airport are all located in Lincoln.

== Geography ==
Lincoln is home to Honda Manufacturing of Alabama, employing over 4,000 people. Talladega Superspeedway race track is located near the city. It is located off of exit 173 along I-20, which is just outside the city limits.

According to the U.S. Census Bureau, the city has a total area of 21.5 square miles (56 km^{2}), of which 21.3 square miles (55 km^{2}) is land and 0.1 square miles (0.26 km^{2}) (0.61%) is water.

The city is located along Interstate 20, which runs west to east through the southern part of the city. Access to the city can be found from exits 165 and 168. Via I-20, Birmingham is 44 mi (71 km) west, and Atlanta is 106 mi (171 km) east. U.S. Route 78 also runs west to east through the city. Alabama State Route 77 connects the city with Talladega, which is 13 mi (21 km) south.

== Education ==
Lincoln has three public schools in the Talladega County Schools, Lincoln Elementary School, Charles R. Drew Middle School, and Lincoln High School, Home of The Golden Bears. The first graduate of Lincoln High School was the famous Cities Service Company CEO Burl S. Watson, who graduated from LHS in 1912.

The Birmingham Supplementary School Inc. (BSS, バーミングハム日本語補習校 Bāminguhamu Nihongo Hoshūkō), a part-time Japanese school, has its offices at the Honda Manufacturing of Alabama, LLC facility in unincorporated Talladega County, near Lincoln. It holds its classes at the Shelby-Hoover campus of Jefferson State Community College in Hoover. The school first opened on September 1, 2001.

== Demographics ==
Historical population
Census	Pop.	Note	%±
1920	498		—
1930	429		−13.9%
1940	420		−2.1%
1950	547		30.2%
1960	629		15.0%
1970	1,127		79.2%
1980	2,081		84.6%
1990	2,941		41.3%
2000	4,577		55.6%
2010	6,266		36.9%
2020	6,845		9.2%
U.S. Decennial Census; 2013 Estimate

=== 2020 census ===
As of the 2020 census, Lincoln had a population of 6,845 and 1,908 families. The median age was 40.6 years. 22.0% of residents were under the age of 18 and 16.6% were 65 years of age or older. For every 100 females there were 90.9 males, and for every 100 females age 18 and over there were 87.5 males age 18 and over.

0.0% of residents lived in urban areas, while 100.0% lived in rural areas.

There were 2,765 households in Lincoln, of which 32.6% had children under the age of 18 living in them. Of all households, 49.4% were married-couple households, 16.5% were households with a male householder and no spouse or partner present, and 28.0% were households with a female householder and no spouse or partner present. About 25.0% of all households were made up of individuals and 10.5% had someone living alone who was 65 years of age or older.

There were 3,287 housing units, of which 15.9% were vacant. The homeowner vacancy rate was 1.9% and the rental vacancy rate was 22.7%.

Racial composition as of the 2020 census
Race	Number	Percent
White	4,748	69.4%
Black or African American	1,734	25.3%
American Indian and Alaska Native	13	0.2%
Asian	40	0.6%
Native Hawaiian and Other Pacific Islander	6	0.1%
Some other race	49	0.7%
Two or more races	255	3.7%
Hispanic or Latino (of any race)	115	1.7%

=== 2010 census ===
At the 2010 census, there were 6,266 people, 2,478 households, and 1,785 families living in the city. The population density was 294.2 inhabitants per square mile (113.6/km^{2}). There were 3,197 housing units at an average density of 150.1 per square mile (58.0/km^{2}). The racial makeup of the city was 73.3% White, 23.4% Black or African American, 0.5% Native American, 0.4% Asian, 1.0% from other races, and 1.4% from two or more races. 1.9% of the population were Hispanic or Latino of any race.

Of the 1,831 households 29.3% had children under the age of 18 living with them, 51.5% were married couples living together, 15.3% had a female householder with no husband present, and 28.0% were non-families. 22.9% of households were one person and 7.5% were one person aged 65 or older. The average household size was 2.51 and the average family size was 2.94.

The age distribution was 23.1% under the age of 18, 7.8% from 18 to 24, 27.4% from 25 to 44, 29.2% from 45 to 64, and 12.5% 65 or older. The median age was 39.4 years. For every 100 females, there were 96.8 males. For every 100 females age 18 and over, there were 95.0 males.

The median household income was $36,919 and the median family income was $42,139. Males had a median income of $36,991 versus $21,804 for females. The per capita income for the city was $19,123. About 11.1% of families and 14.3% of the population were below the poverty line, including 22.4% of those under age 18 and 16.7% of those age 65 or over.

=== 2000 census ===
At the 2000 census, there were 4,577 people, 1,831 households, and 1,354 families living in the city. The population density was 214.6 inhabitants per square mile (82.9/km^{2}). There were 2,297 housing units at an average density of 107.7 per square mile (41.6/km^{2}). The racial makeup of the city was 71.90% White, 27.05% Black or African American, 0.31% Native American, 0.07% Asian, 0.07% from other races, and 0.61% from two or more races. 0.70% of the population were Hispanic or Latino of any race.

Of the 1,831 households 28.5% had children under the age of 18 living with them, 58.0% were married couples living together, 12.7% had a female householder with no husband present, and 26.0% were non-families. 22.3% of households were one person and 5.9% were one person aged 65 or older. The average household size was 2.50 and the average family size was 2.89.

The age distribution was 22.9% under the age of 18, 8.3% from 18 to 24, 28.4% from 25 to 44, 28.8% from 45 to 64, and 11.6% 65 or older. The median age was 39 years. For every 100 females, there were 95.2 males. For every 100 females age 18 and over, there were 92.5 males.

The median household income was $34,053 and the median family income was $36,900. Males had a median income of $29,407 versus $24,102 for females. The per capita income for the city was $18,442. About 9.4% of families and 13.4% of the population were below the poverty line, including 17.6% of those under age 18 and 26.1% of those age 65 or over.

== Industry ==
Honda, through its subsidiary, Honda Manufacturing of Alabama, operates a manufacturing plant in Lincoln. As of 2020, Honda Odyssey, Honda Pilot, and Honda Ridgeline vehicles are built there, as well as the Honda J-series V6 engine.

== Notable people ==
- Pleasant Crump, last verifiable veteran who fought for the Confederacy during the American Civil War
- Burl S. Watson, President and CEO of Cities Service Company during parts of the 1950s and 1960s
