= Honda Manufacturing of Alabama =

Automobile factory in the United States

Honda Manufacturing of Alabama, LLC
- Built: 1999–2001
- Operated: November 14, 2001
- Location: Lincoln, Alabama, United States
- Coordinates: 33°36′58″N 86°08′44″W
- Industry: Automotive
- Products: Honda Odyssey; Honda Pilot; Honda Ridgeline; Honda Passport; Honda J engine
- Employees: about 5,800
- Area: 1,350 acres (550 ha)
- Volume: 4,900,000 sq ft (460,000 m^{2})
- Owner: Honda
- Website: hondaalabama.com

Honda Manufacturing of Alabama (HM) is an automobile factory located in Lincoln, Alabama. It builds light truck Honda vehicles (pickup trucks and crossover SUVs) for sale in North America. Production began on November 14, 2001 and was the first Honda factory to both produce engines and assemble vehicles under the same roof. HM is the sole manufacturer of the Honda Odyssey, Honda Passport, Honda Pilot, and Honda Ridgeline. Honda Alabama no longer goes by the acronym of HMA.

The facility has almost 5,800 employees, with a $493 million payroll and average earnings of $85,488. It contributed $12 billion in economic impact in 2024, with its suppliers, supporting 47,000 across Alabama. Together with its suppliers, the facility generated more than $265 million in state and local tax revenue.

The first vehicle the factory produced was the Honda Odyssey in November 2001. In 2004 the Honda Pilot was added as the second vehicle the factory was producing. In 2009 the Alabama factory picked up production of the Honda Ridgeline. Between 2009-2010 the factory produced the V6-engined model of the Honda Accord, but all production of the Accord has since moved back to the Marysville Auto Plant. In 2013 the factory began production of the 2014 Acura MDX. From May 2017 Honda started to dual-source Acura MDX from both Alabama and East Liberty Auto Plant until Alabama switched from producing MDX to additional Pilot at the end of 2017.

In 2019, Honda Alabama produced over 351,000 vehicles and V6 engines, and over 369,500 vehicles and V6 engines in 2016.

In 2026, Honda announced to invest $462 million to expand auto production and a new V6 hybrid engine assembly line. It will create two hundred new jobs. The plant's Line 1 will be renovated to add flexibility to build multiple vehicle models.

== Vehicles ==
- Honda Odyssey 2001-present
- Honda Pilot 2003-present
- Honda Ridgeline 2005-present
- Honda Passport 2019-present

== Engines ==
- Honda J engine

== Previously Produced Vehicles ==
- Honda Accord: V6 model only, between 2009-2010
- Acura MDX: 2013-2017
