= Honda R&D Americas =

American division of Honda Motor Company

Honda R&D Americas, Inc.
- Company type: Division of Honda
- Founded: 1975
- Headquarters: Torrance, California, United States
- Area served: International
- Key people: James A. Keller, President
- Products: Honda Odyssey; Honda Pilot; Honda Ridgeline; Acura TL; Acura MDX; Acura ZDX; Acura TLX; Honda Civic
- Number of employees: more than 10,000
- Parent: Honda
- Website: www.hondaresearch.com

Honda R&D Americas, Inc. (HRA) is an American division of Honda Motor Company that develops automobiles, motorcycles, all-terrain vehicles, outdoor power equipment; lawnmowers, boat outboard engines, and jet engines. It develops vehicles for Honda and Acura sales in conjunction with other global R&D centers.

Honda R&D Americas has 14 facilities in Canada and U.S., including Torrance, California, Raymond, Ohio; Detroit, Michigan; Denver, Colorado; Haw River, North Carolina; Cincinnati, Ohio; Los Angeles downtown; Burlington, North Carolina; Timmonsville, South Carolina; Grant-Valkaria, Florida; Toronto, Ontario and Halifax, Nova Scotia.

== See also ==
- Honda
- Acura
- HondaJet
