= Honda Ridgeline =

Mid-size pickup truck

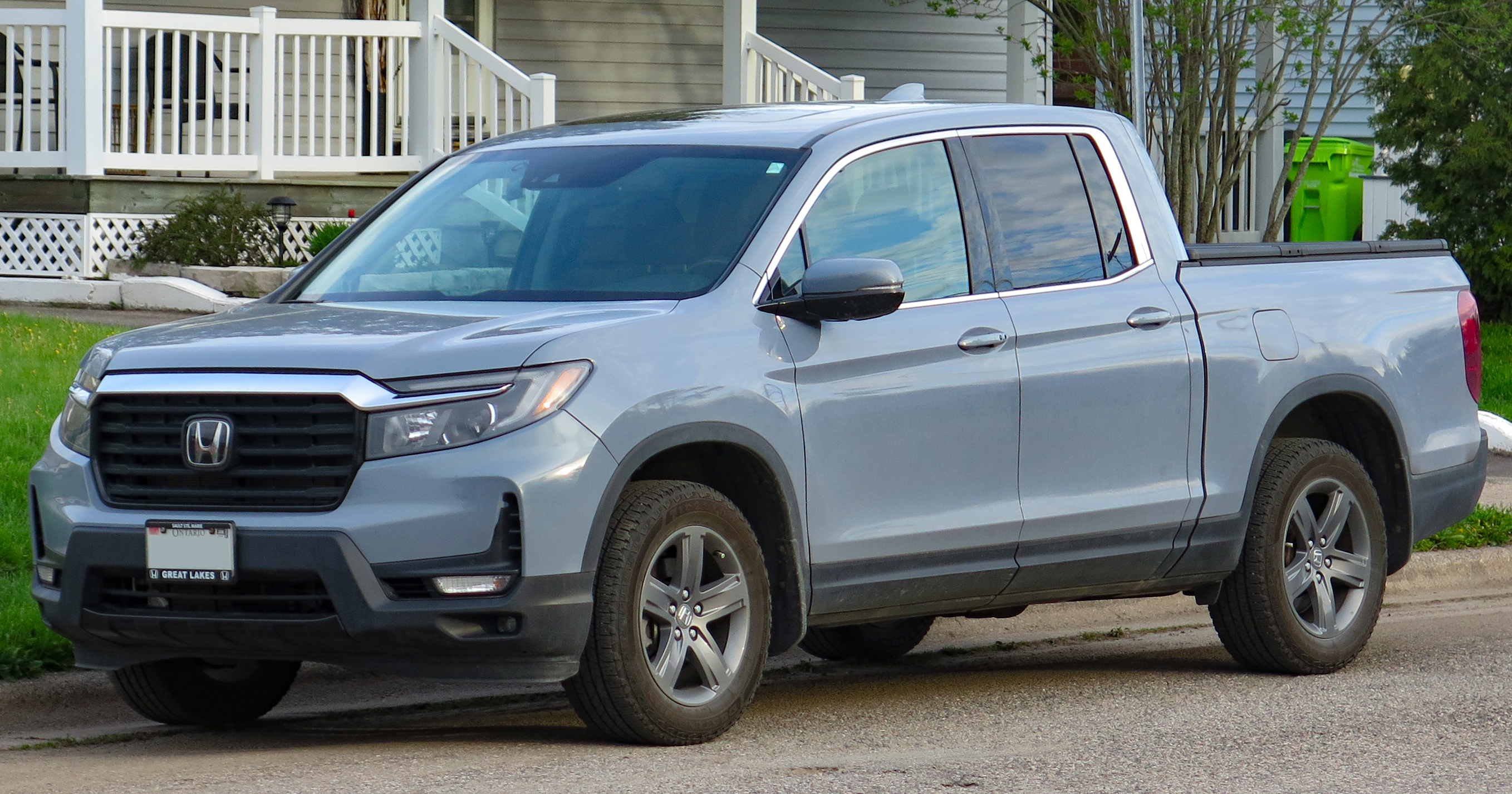
- 2022 Honda Ridgeline

Overview
- Manufacturer: Honda
- Production: 2005–early 2015; 2016–present
- Model years: 2006–2014; 2017–present
- Assembly: Canada: Alliston, Ontario (HCM) (2004–2009); United States: Lincoln, Alabama (HMA) (2008–2015, 2016–present)

Body and chassis
- Class: Mid-size pickup truck
- Body style: 4-door pickup truck
- Layout: Front-engine, all-wheel drive (2006–present); Front-engine, front-wheel-drive (select 2017–2020)
- Chassis: Unibody

The Honda Ridgeline is a mid-size pickup truck manufactured and marketed by Honda since the 2006 model year, over two generations in a unibody, crew–cab, short-box configuration with a transverse-mounted engine.

== First generation (YK1; 2006) ==
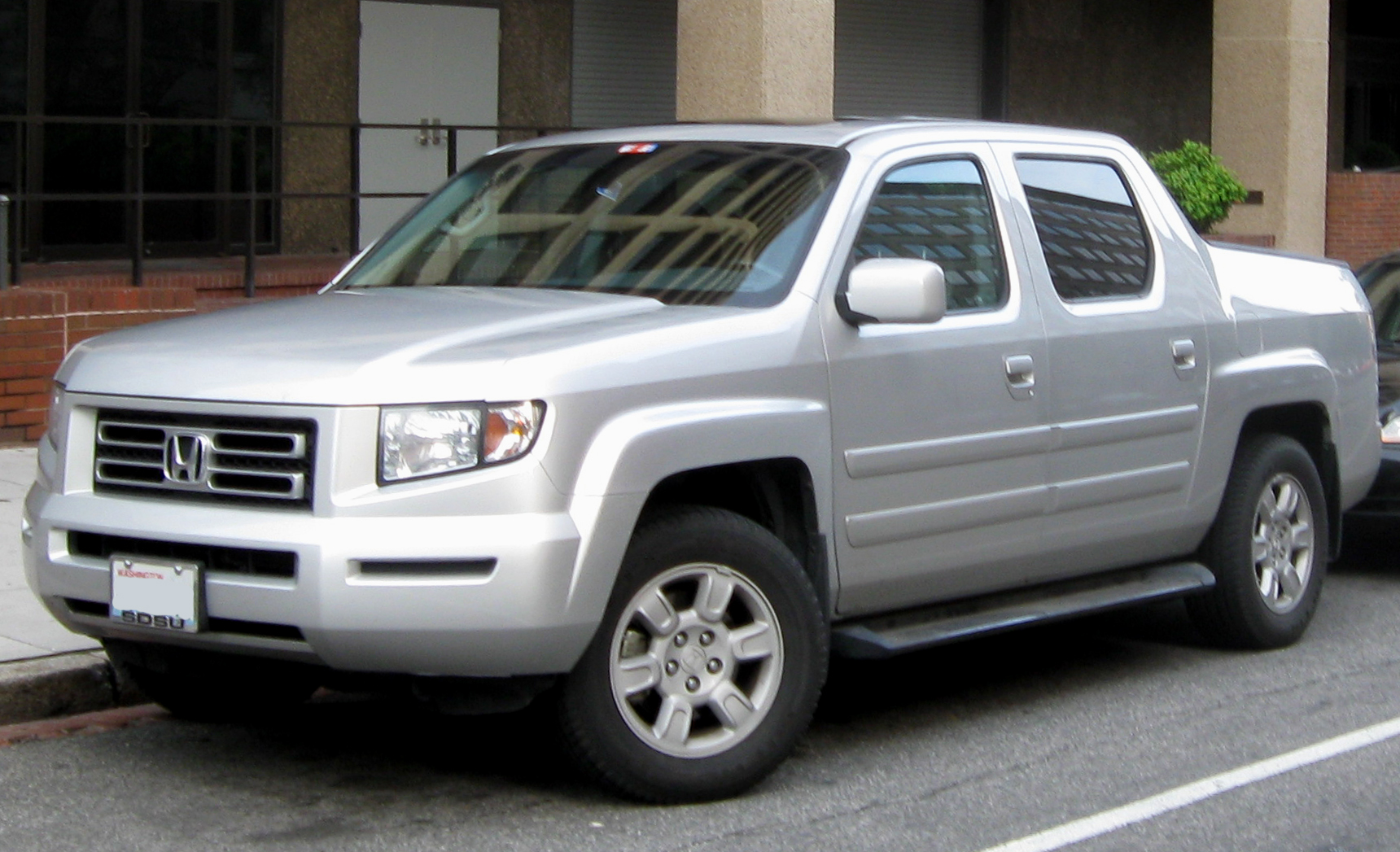
First-generation Honda Ridgeline

The first-generation Ridgeline went on sale in March 2005 as a 2006 model year vehicle. The Car Design Yearbook called it "Honda's first foray into the true heartland of the American automotive way of life—the pickup truck." An engineering team from Honda R&D Americas, led by Gary Flint, designed the vehicle. According to the author of Driving Honda, the automaker wanted to target buyers who were looking to move to a pickup from sedans, minivans, and sport utility vehicles (SUV).

The development started in 2001 with a development mule using an extended version of a first-generation Acura MDX with a competitor's pickup bed integrated into the rear structure. After four years of development, a Sport Utility Truck Concept was shown at the 2004 North American International Auto Show. Later that same year, Honda unveiled a revised version at the Specialty Equipment Market Association show and announced the official name of the vehicle, the Ridgeline. The production version of the Ridgeline was unveiled the following year at the 2005 North American International Auto Show.

Honda's publications claim that the first-generation Ridgeline shared only 7% of its components with other Honda vehicles. Its powertrain resembled the one used in the first-generation Acura MDX but was "extensively calibrated and strengthened" for heavier hauling and towing duties.

Production of the first generation Ridgeline ended in early 2015.

== Second generation (YK2/3; 2017) ==
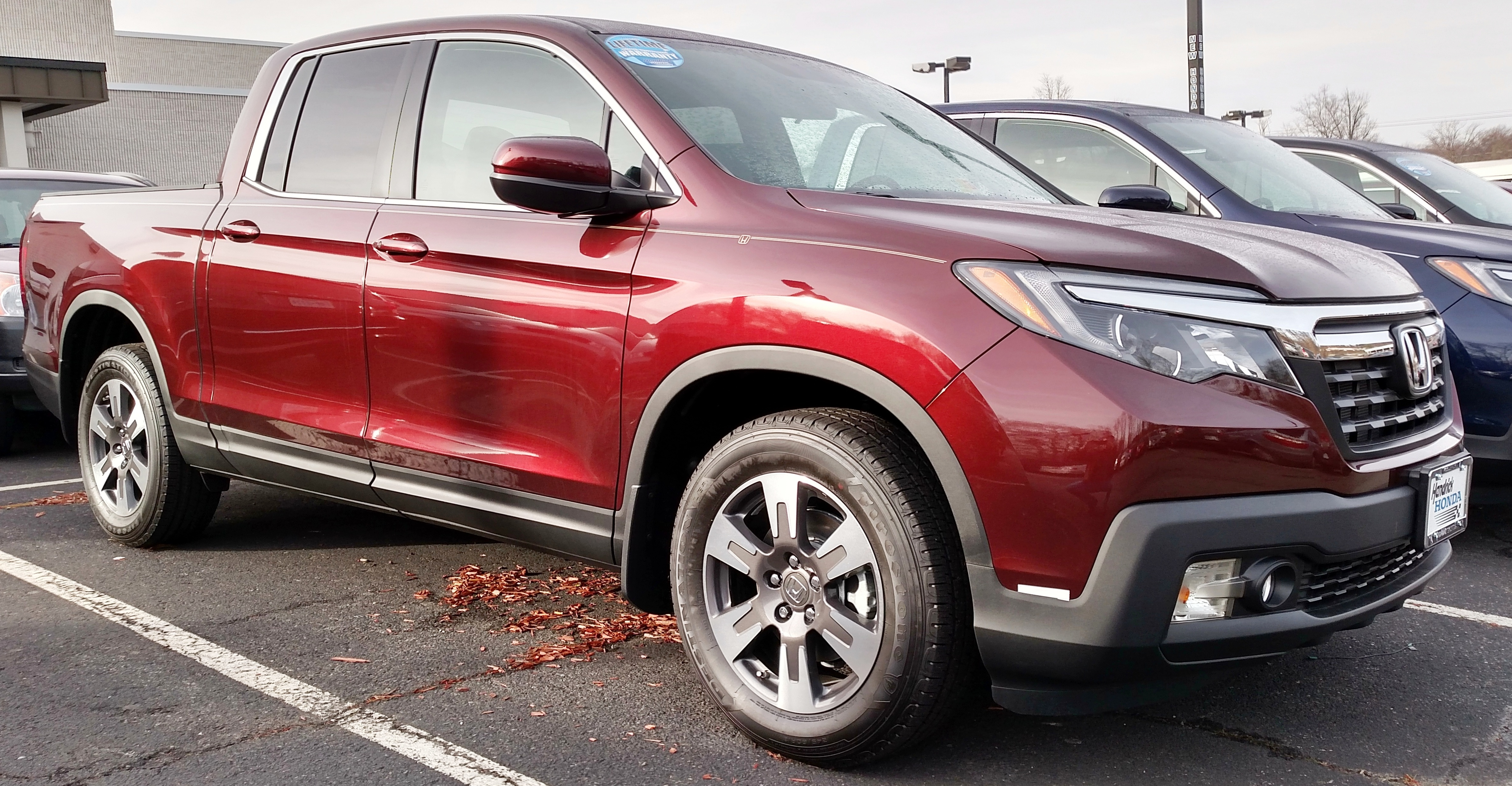
2017 Ridgeline RTL (front-wheel drive model)

After a one-year hiatus in Ridgeline production, the second-generation went on sale in June 2016 as a 2017 model year vehicle. The second-generation Ridgeline took a different approach in design from the first generation Ridgeline by sharing Honda's new "global light truck platform," used for the third-generation Honda Pilot as well as other large Honda vehicles. Honda modified the Pilot platform, including extending the wheelbase and various parts to support hauling, towing, and off-road use. Honda reported that 73% of the second-generation Ridgeline's components remain common with the third-generation Pilot. Major changes included a 17% stronger front structure, a 31% sturdier rear, and 50% of the chassis' components changed or were strengthened for the second generation Ridgeline. The second generation Ridgeline's new structure gives it an average 78 lb (35 kg) reduction in weight from the first generation pickup. The C-pillar and rear subframe were strengthened giving the second generation 28% more torsional rigidity over the first generation Ridgeline.

== Third generation ==
On July 23, 2026, Honda confirmed a third-generation Ridgeline midsize pickup, to be released within the next two years, featuring a more rugged design and a new, high-efficiency platform. The next-generation pickup is styled at Honda’s Southern California design studio and engineered at Ohio's Auto Development Center. Production of the current model will pause for 18 months at the Alabama plant to facilitate this transition.

== Marketing ==
The design of the unibody pickup with a transverse-mounted engine and a crew-cab short-box configuration makes the Ridgeline unique. Some in the automotive press that have studied the first-generation Ridgeline, such as PickupTrucks.com, consider it "one of those odd vehicles". They wrote, "The Ridgeline can't really do what most people who like trucks need it to do." Others in the automotive press had differing views, such as The Driver's Seat TV, who called the Ridgeline "the Swiss Army knife of trucks". They also described the Ridgeline as "the anti-truck" and summarized their view by stating, "The Ridgeline scores high on practicality but very low on image."

Compared to the first-generation Ridgeline, Honda's second-generation Ridgeline has the automotive press changing its tune, yet it still has an image problem. Gearheads.org wrote the "2017 Honda Ridgeline still won’t get respect but should" stating, its "downside is going to be looks." Car and Driver wrote, "The company [Honda] readily admits that the problem with the first generation pickup was that the styling was off-putting, but then it went ahead and made the next iteration of the truck just as unconventional as before." "The Ridgeline’s roomy cabin, ample storage, smooth ride, and innovative touches make its rivals seem outdated. ...it not only has cargo space, but also the makings of a great tailgate party..."

Karl Forster, an SAE trailer towing group member who was vehicle dynamics project leader on Honda's unibody Ridgeline pickup and Pilot SUV described studies of pickup usage and "found out that 84 percent of truck buyers tow 5000 pounds or less."

== Production and sales ==
According to Honda, the Ridgeline was not designed to take sales from the traditional trucks marketed in North America, but was developed to "give the 18% of Honda owners who also own pickups a chance to make their garages a Honda-only parking area." Despite the first generation Ridgeline's poor sales, according to the author of Driving Honda, this mid-size pickup was one of the more profitable vehicles for Honda with reported sales in over 20 countries.

The second generation Ridgeline sales appeared to start strong but comparing sales in the US between 2017 and 2018 shows a 12% decline overall. A 2018 Autoline Daily report stated the Ridgeline is the only mid-size truck in North America whose sales are down in a market that "suggests there’s room for more players."

Ridgeline sales and production
Calendar year	Sales		Production
Calendar year	USA	CAN	Production
2004			199
2005	42,593	3,512	60,679
2006	50,193	4,988	56,866
2007	42,795	4,519	55,150
2008	33,875	3,987	25,264
2009	16,464	3,546	16,180
2010	16,142	3,200	20,180
2011	9,759	1,713	13,356
2012	14,068	2,226	21,361
2013	17,723	2,122	19,557
2014	13,389	1,803	10,015
2015	520	229	154
2016	23,668	2,622	34,599
2017	34,749	4,632	39,282
2018	30,592	4,094	46,123
2019	33,334	3,405	29,246
2020	32,168	3,369	34,055
2021	41,355	3,491	41,822
2022	42,762	3,135	50,434
2023	52,001	3,114	54,934
2024	45,421	3,435	55,843
2025	48,448	3,314	50,221

== Awards ==
- North American Car of the Year for 2006 and 2017.
- Canadian Car of the Year and Best New Pickup for 2006
- MotorTrend's 2006 Truck of the Year
- Car and Driver's #1 mid-size truck for 2006, and 2017–2019
- Autobytel's 2006 Truck of the Year
- Sobre Ruedas (On Wheels, a Latin American automotive magazine) 2005 Best Pick-up Truck
- Auto123.com's 2017 Pickup of the Year
- J.D. Power and Associates' Automotive Performance, Execution, and Layout (APEAL) Award for 2006–2008, 2017, and 2018
- Green Car Journal's 2017 Green Truck of the Year
- Consumer Guide Automotive's Best Buy Award for 2017–2019
- Kelley Blue Book's Top Ten Best Resale Value Award for 2017–2019
- The Car Connection's Best Pickup to Buy for 2018
- Women's Choice Awards in the Eco-Friendly and Safety categories for 2018
- Popular Mechanics' 2006 Automotive Excellence Award for functionality
- Society of Plastics Engineers 2006 Grand Award for the composite in–bed trunk
- National Highway Traffic Safety Administration's first four-door pickup to earn five-star safety rating
- IIHS's first pickup to earn the Top Safety Pick-Plus award (2017) and has also earned the Top Safety Pick award for 2009, 2012, and 2013, and is the only pickup to earn the award for 2018 and 2019
- SCORE Baja off-road race winner in the Stock Mini Class in 2008 and 2010 as well as Class 7 in 2015, 2016, 2018, and 2019
- iSeeCars.com's longest-lasting truck, most likely to reach 200,000 miles
