= Honda Pilot =

Mid-size crossover SUV

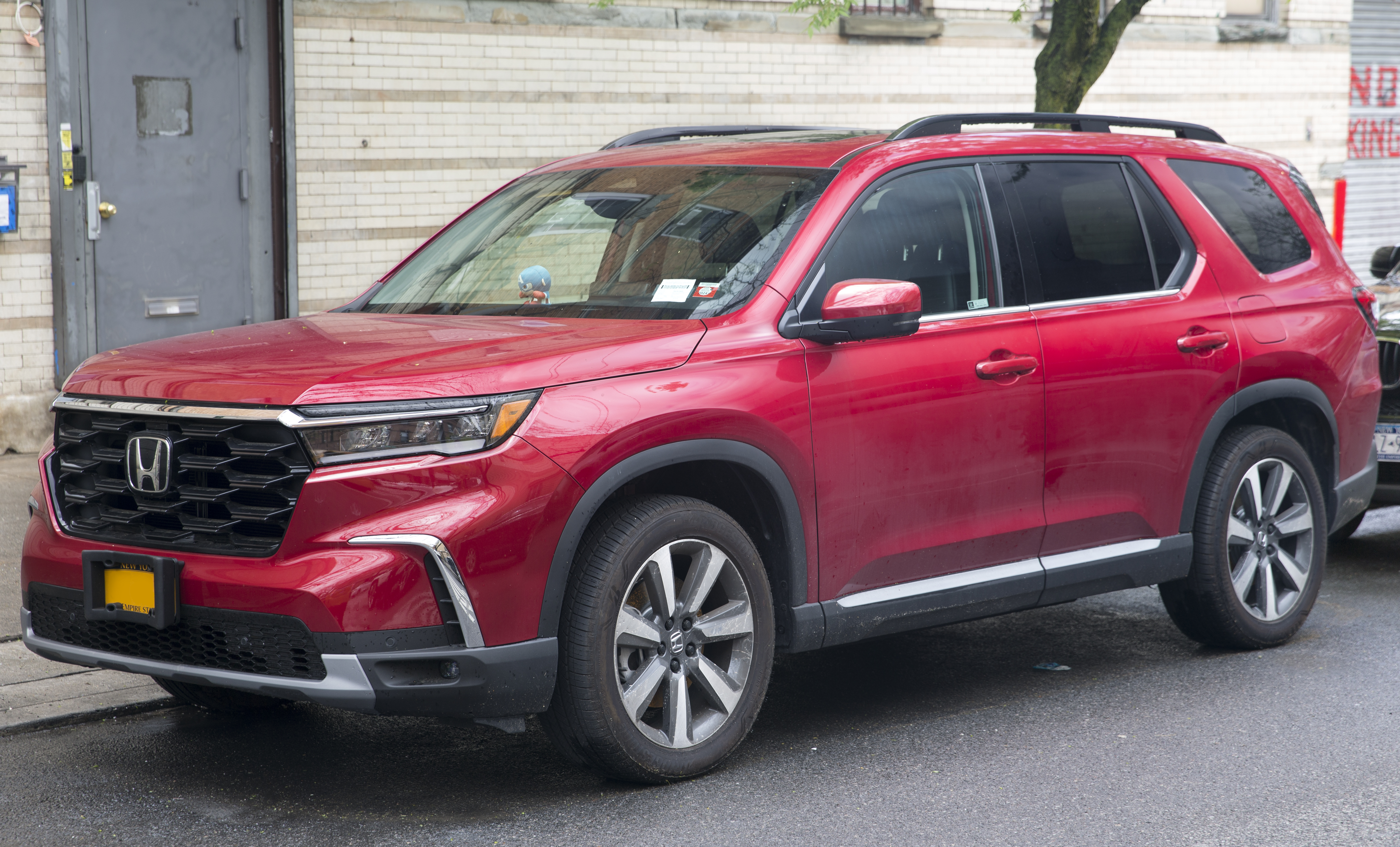
- Fourth-generation Pilot

Overview
- Manufacturer: Honda
- Production: 2002–present
- Model years: 2003–present

Body and chassis
- Class: Mid-size crossover SUV
- Body style: 5-door SUV
- Layout: Front-engine, four-wheel-drive (2003–present); Front-engine, front-wheel-drive (2006–present)

The Honda Pilot is a mid-size sport utility vehicle with three-row seating manufactured by Honda since 2002 for the 2003 model year. Primarily aimed at the North American market, the Pilot is the largest SUV produced by Honda. As of 2025, the Pilot is manufactured in Lincoln, Alabama, and the Pilot was produced in Alliston, Ontario, until April 2007. The first generation Pilot was released in April 2002 as a 2003 model.

The Pilot shares its platform with the Acura MDX, as well as the North American market Odyssey minivan. The Pilot's unibody construction and independent suspension are designed to provide handling similar to that of a car, and it has integrated perimeter frame rails to permit towing and light off-road use.

Prior to the introduction of the Pilot, Honda marketed the compact crossover CR-V, midsize crossover MDX, the midsize Passport (rebadged Isuzu Rodeo) fullsize Crossroad (rebadged Land Rover Discovery series 1) and Acura SLX (rebadged Isuzu Trooper). Unlike the Passport, Crossroad and SLX which were truck-based body-on-frame designs, the Pilot shared a unibody construction layout akin to the Accord-based MDX. The Pilot is Honda's largest SUV, although the 2010 Crosstour surpassed the Pilot in length.

The Pilot is sold in North America and the Middle East, while the Honda MDX (first generation Acura MDX) was marketed in Japan and Australia for several years. The second-generation Pilot was also sold in Russia, Ukraine, South Korea, Latin America, and the Philippines.

== First generation (YF1/2; 2003) ==
First generation
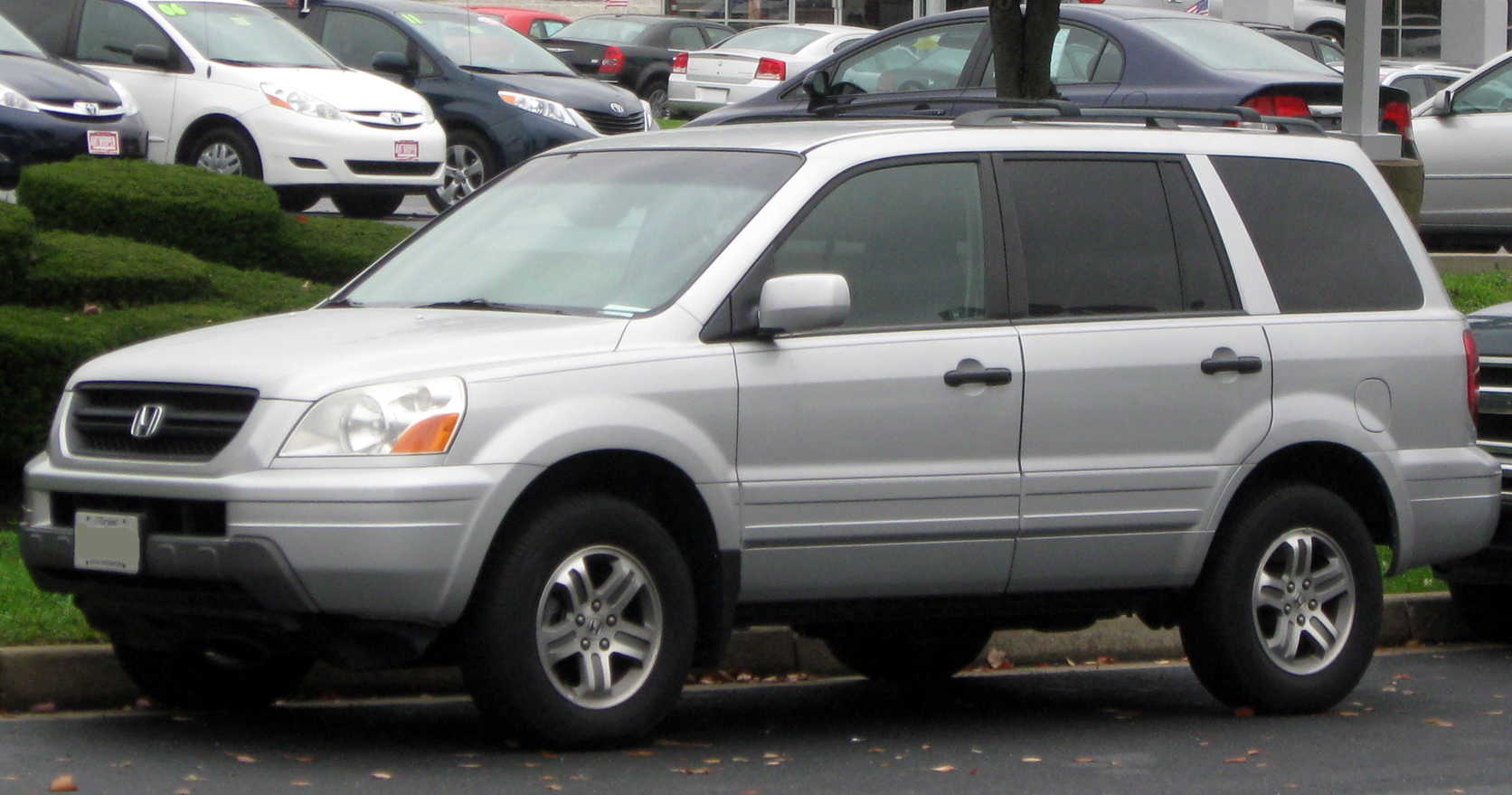
- 2003–2005 Honda Pilot

Overview
- Model code: YF1/2
- Also called: Honda MR-V (Middle East)
- Production: April 2002 – April 2008
- Model years: 2003–2008
- Assembly: Canada: Alliston, Ontario (HCM; 2003–2007); United States: Lincoln, Alabama (HMA)
- Designer: Ricky Hsu (1999)

Body and chassis
- Related: Acura MDX; Honda Odyssey

Powertrain
- Engine: 3.5 L J35A4 V6 (2003-2004); 3.5 L J35A6 V6 (2005); 3.5 L J35Z1 V6 (2006-2008 FWD); 3.5 L J35A9 V6 (2006-2008 4WD)
- Transmission: 5-speed automatic

Dimensions
- Wheelbase: 106.3 in (2,700 mm)
- Length: 188.0 in (4,775 mm)
- Width: 2003–05: 77.3 in (1,963 mm); 2003–05 LX: 76.3 in (1,938 mm); 2006–08: 77.5 in (1,968 mm)
- Height: 2003–05: 71.7 in (1,821 mm); 2003–05: 70.6 in (1,793 mm); 2006–08 2WD LX: 70.1 in (1,781 mm); 2006–08 4WD LX: 70.4 in (1,788 mm); 2006–08 2WD EX/EX-L: 71.3 in (1,811 mm); 2006–08 4WD EX/EX-L: 71.7 in (1,821 mm)

=== Specifications ===
The first-generation Pilot was unveiled in December 2001 and later released for sale on June 3, 2002 for the 2003 model year. The 2003 and 2004 Pilot models featured the J35A4 engine, an all-aluminum 3.5L V6 SOHC with VTEC, producing 240 hp (179 kW) and 242 lb⋅ft (328 N⋅m) of torque.

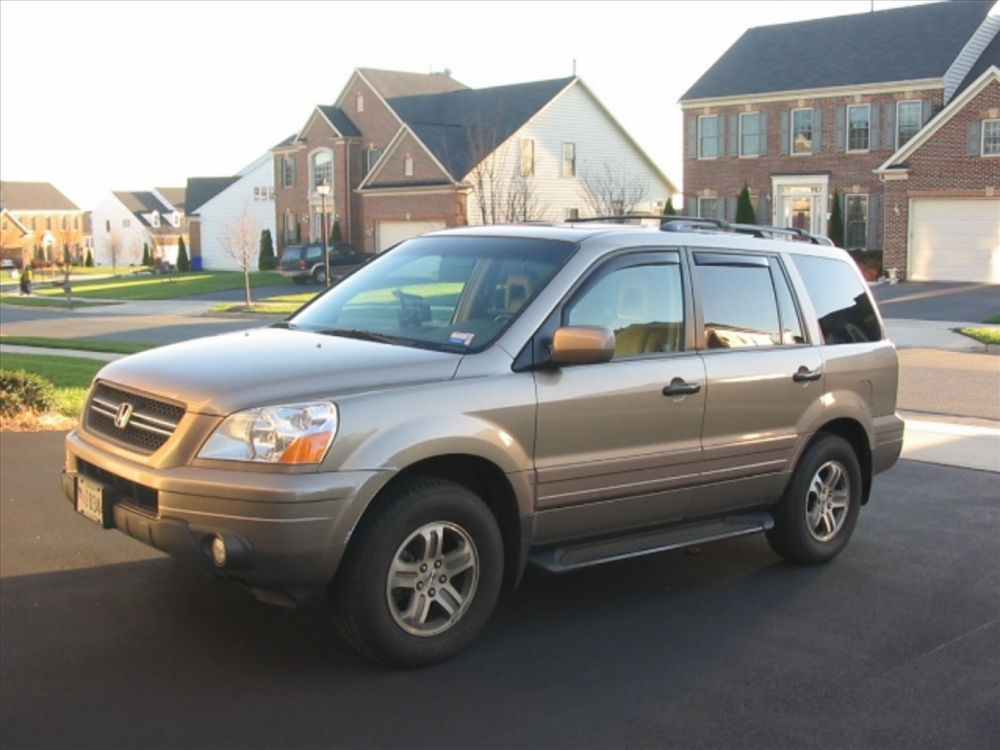
2003 Honda Pilot EX-L RES in Sandstone Metallic

The 2005 Pilot received a new engine, the J35A6, which added drive-by-wire throttle and produced 255 hp (190 kW) and 250 lb⋅ft (339 N⋅m) of torque. Other changes included the transmission with revised 4th and 5th gear ratios providing a smoother transition between gears, along with a new fuel tank design, increasing the Pilot's driving range by over 40 mi (64 km). All Pilots from 2003-2005 feature VTM-4, Honda's four-wheel drive system.

The Pilot received more updates in 2005 starting with the 2006 model year, engines were either the J35Z1 (FWD) or the J35A9 (4WD). Both engines were rated at 244 hp (182 kW) and 240 lb⋅ft (325 N⋅m) of torque; the power reduction is because Honda used the updated SAE net power standard. This was the first time 4WD was not standard on the Pilot.

The new FWD models featured Honda's Variable Cylinder Management (VCM) system, which can deactivate up to three cylinders under light load to increase fuel economy, to help control noise from the system Honda added Active Control Engine Mount System (ACM) and Active Noise Cancellation (ANC). Further, this version of the J35 featured updated iVTEC and the automatic transmission a shorter 1st gear ratio. With powertrain updates and the lack of VTM-4 the FWD version had improved fuel economy of 18-city/24-highway, an increase of +1/+2 mpg versus the 4WD.

All Pilots from this generation feature a 5-speed automatic transmission. The Pilot has front struts with a coil-spring, multilink rear suspension for a flat rear load floor. The front track is 66.3 in (1,684 mm) and 66.5 in (1,689 mm) at the rear. The Pilot has a 4,500 lb (2,041 kg) boat/3,500 lb (1,588 kg) trailer towing capability with the optional dealer-installed towing package.

Pilots with Honda's Variable Torque Management 4WD system (VTM-4) sent most power to the front wheels under normal driving conditions. Under acceleration or if wheel slippage is detected at the front wheels, up to 50% of power can be sent to the rear wheels. The system also features a VTM-4 lock button on the dashboard which locks the rear differential and sends 25% of the power to each rear wheel. However, the VTM-4 lock function only operates in first gear, second gear and reverse, and automatically disengages above 18 mph (29 km/h), then re-engages when the speed drops below 18 mph (29 km/h).

=== Design ===
Design of the Pilot was by Honda's Ricky Hsu through 1999, when styling was approved. The Pilot can accommodate eight passengers in three rows configured as stadium seating as a standard feature. The third row can seat three, but the limited legroom makes it suitable only for small children or adults on short trips. Similar to the Honda Odyssey, the rear seats can be folded into flat surfaces for larger cargo. Options include a DVD entertainment system or a navigation system for EX-L models, but both cannot be installed simultaneously on the same car.

Other features include ABS-equipped four-wheel disc brakes, rack-and-pinion steering, four-wheel independent suspension, and 282° of outward visibility.

==== Model year changes ====
For the 2004 model year, Honda increased adjustability on second-row seats and added heated front seats and side mirrors to EX-L models.

For 2005 model year, Honda added tire pressure monitoring, electronic stability control, revised steering, and upgraded the airbags. The front passenger airbag featured occupant-sensing deactivation.

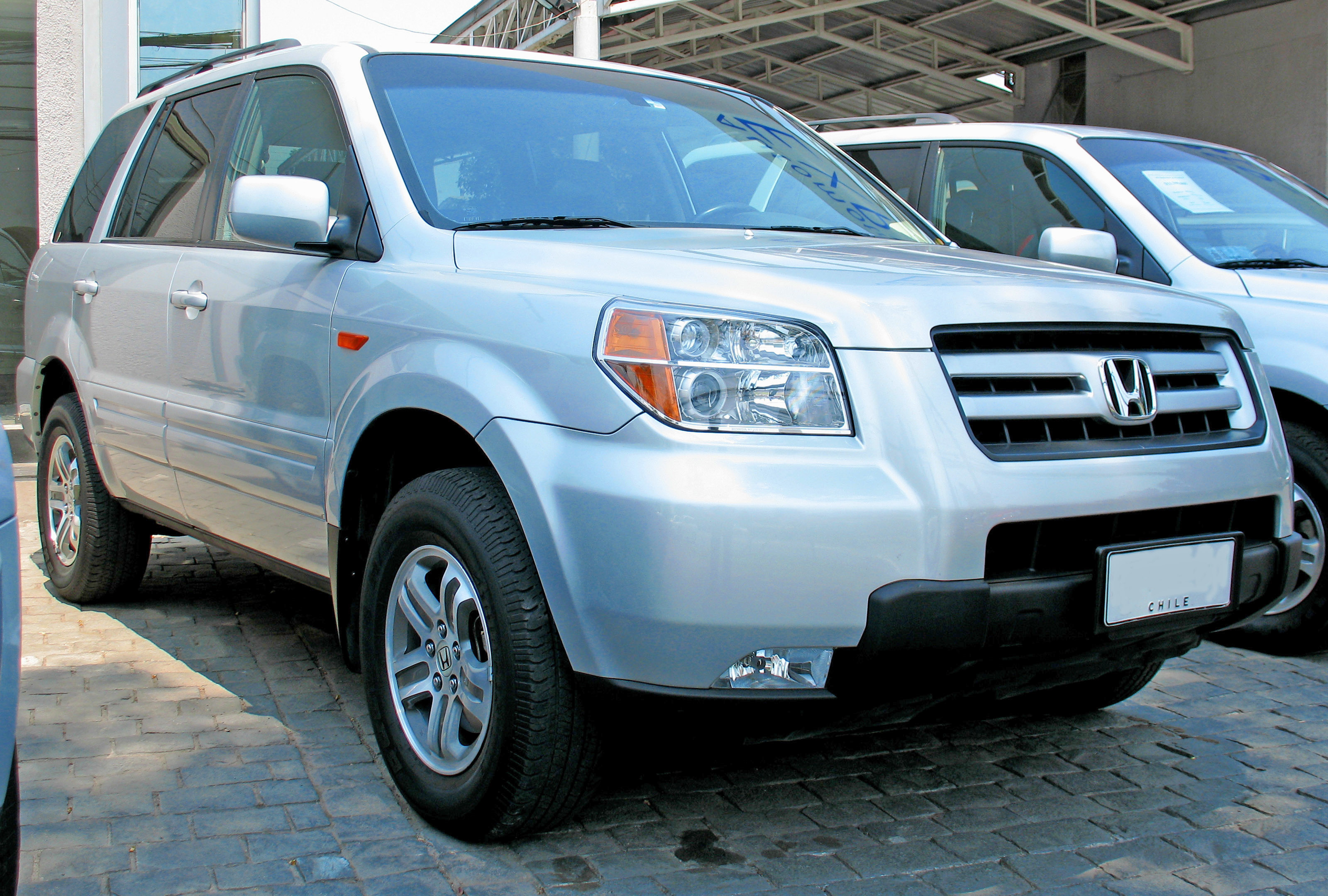
2008 Honda Pilot EX with mid-cycle refresh details.

Honda revised the Pilot in October 2005 for the 2006 model year. Changes to the exterior included a new fascia with a different grille insert and halogen projector headlights, and tail lights with clear lenses. The EX trim level received redesigned wheels, and the original EX wheels were featured on the LX trim. For the first time, body colored door handles are introduced to the Pilot on the EX trim, and a powered moonroof is introduced to the Pilot on the EX-L trim. On the inside, side airbags were provided in the C pillar, the gauge cluster was updated and the center console featured chrome trim and redesigned storage compartments and cup holders. For the 2006 model year, Honda added Variable Cylinder Management to the two-wheel-drive models. This VCM tech proved to be problematic in some cases, which led to a class action lawsuit for Honda Motor Co.

For the 2007 model year, Honda added Nimbus Gray Metallic, Dark Cherry Pearl, Aberdeen Green Metallic, and Formal Black as four new colors to all models.

For the 2008 model year of the first generation Pilot added two new trims. The VP (Value Package) replaces the LX as base trim and SE (special edition) goes in between the EX and EX-L trim off the honda pilot.

== Second generation (YF3/4; 2009) ==
Second generation
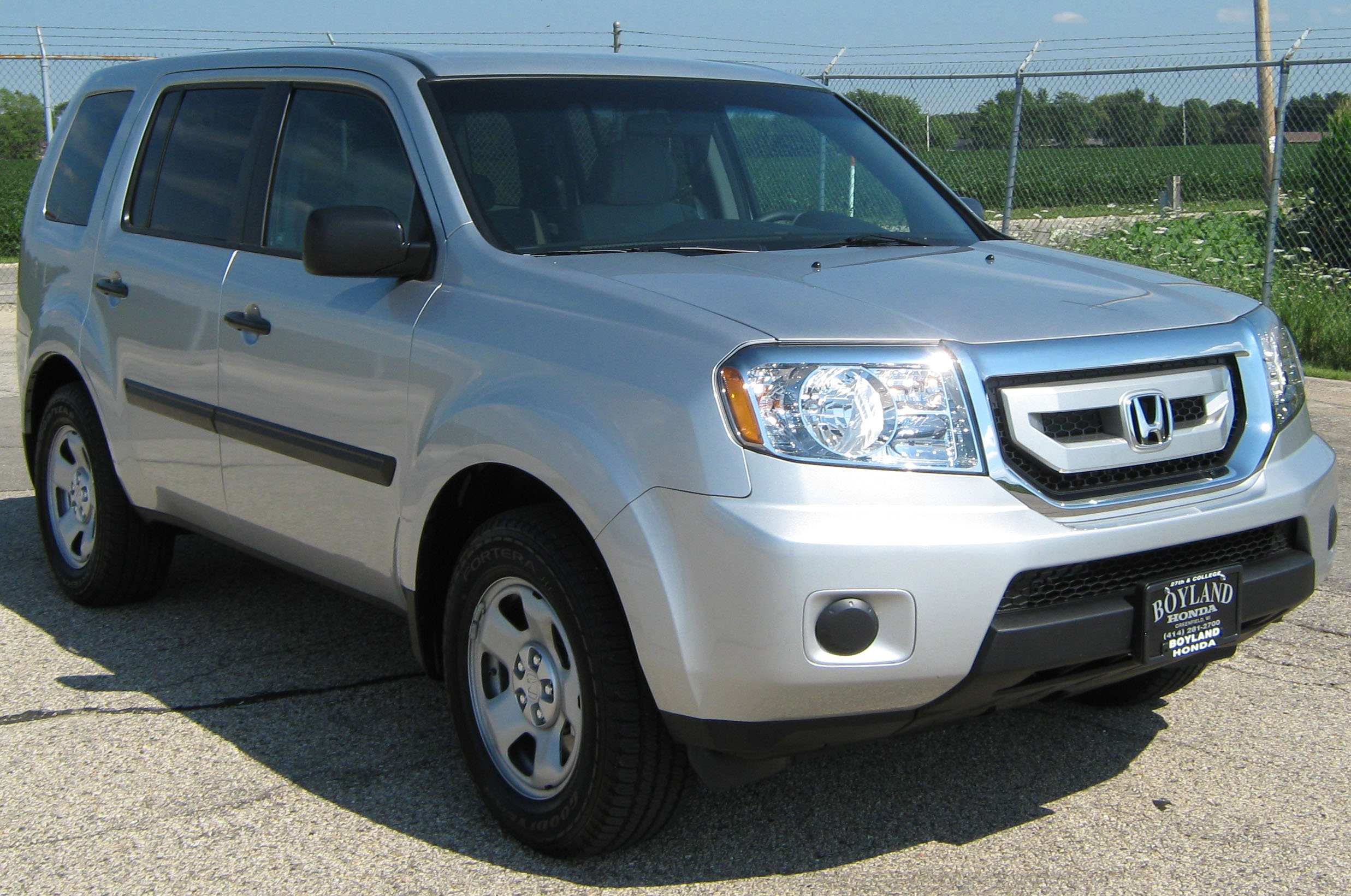
- 2011 Honda Pilot LX

Overview
- Model code: YF3/4
- Production: April 2008 – May 2015
- Model years: 2009–2015
- Assembly: United States: Lincoln, Alabama (HMA)
- Designer: Young Choi (2006)

Body and chassis
- Related: Acura MDX; Honda Odyssey

Powertrain
- Engine: 3.5 L J35Z4 V6
- Transmission: 5-speed automatic

Dimensions
- Wheelbase: 109.2 in (2,774 mm)
- Length: 2009–11: 190.9 in (4,849 mm); 2012–15: 191.4 in (4,862 mm)
- Width: 78.5 in (1,994 mm)
- Height: 2009–11: 72.7 in (1,847 mm); 2012–15: 71.0 in (1,803 mm)

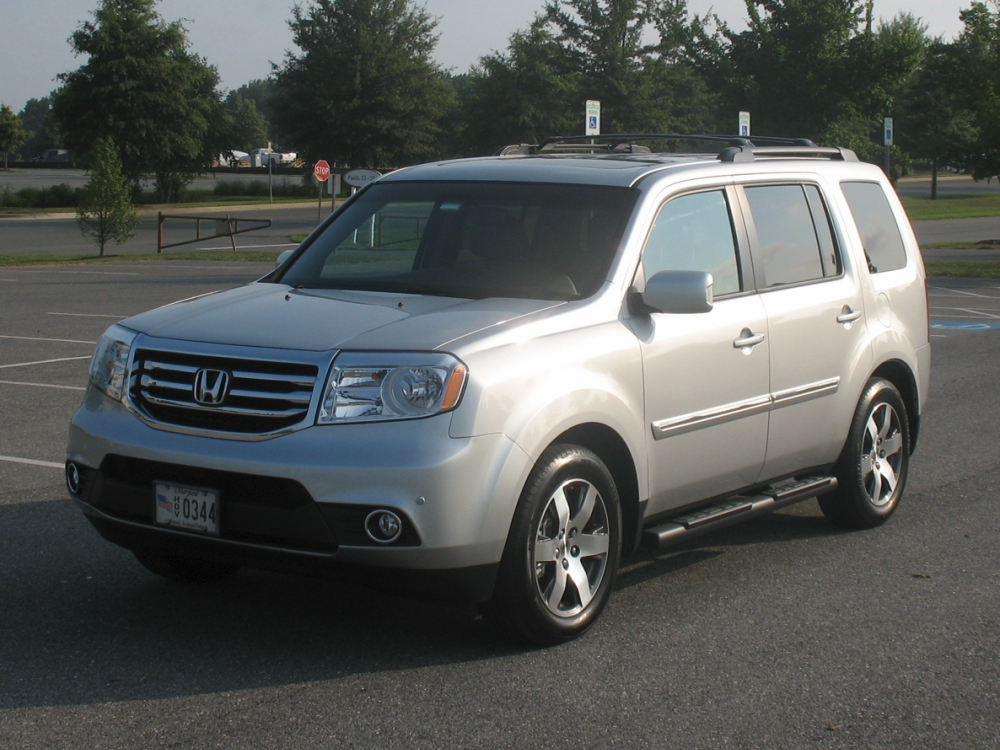
2012 Honda Pilot Touring in Alabaster Silver Metallic

The larger second generation Pilot was unveiled as a prototype in January 2008 at the North American International Auto Show, and was released for sale on May 22, 2008. Assembled at Honda Manufacturing of Alabama in Lincoln, Alabama, it was offered in five trims; LX, EX, EX-L, Touring and SE (2015 only). All second generation Pilots used a new J35Z4 3.5-liter V6 i-VTEC engine producing 250 hp (186 kW; 253 PS) SAE net at 5700 rpm and 253 lb⋅ft (343 N⋅m) of torque at 4800 rpm. EPA fuel economy is rated at 17 mpg_{‑US} (14 L/100 km) city /23 mpg_{‑US} (10 L/100 km) highway with front-wheel-drive and 16 mpg city / 22 mpg highway for all-wheel-drive. Competing with the Toyota 4Runner, it became popular for its truck-like look, which was designed with influences from GM's full-size Chevrolet Tahoe/GMC Yukon. However it was downsized for better fuel efficiency in the third generation.

Both drivetrains were equipped with five-speed automatics. The second generation's wheelbase is 109.2 in (2,774 mm), with a length of 190.9 in (4,849 mm), a width of 78.5 in (1,994 mm), a height of 72.7 in (1,847 mm) and interior space of 153.7 cu ft (4.35 m^{3}). The redesigned headlights lost the previous generation's halogen projectors and return to standard halogen reflectors. Features included new two-position memory settings for the driver's seat, a new power tailgate, and the gear shift was relocated from the steering column to the center console between the front seats. The Touring trim included special "Touring" badging on the right side of the back door, a 120-volt power outlet, and a satellite-linked Honda navigation system.

The backup camera, previously only on Navigation models, was integrated into the rear view mirror of the non-navigation leather-trimmed models (EX-L).

=== Model year changes ===
The 2011 Pilot models had minimal changes. The voice-activated navigation system which was previously exclusive to the Touring trim became available on the EX-L trim and rear entertainment system became standard equipment on the Touring trim.

The 2012 models introduced a redesigned front fascia, new alloy wheels, and updates to the interior along with changes to the bumper. i-MID with integrated backup camera was introduced to EX-L.

The 2013 models included a standard rearview backup camera for LX and EX, i-MID central dashboard 8-inch LCD screen for LX and EX, USB connector, Bluetooth hands-free calling and wireless audio streaming, and tri-zone climate control.

For the 2015 model year, the SE (special edition) trim was added which came standard with a power moonroof, satellite radio, LED headlights (on Touring models), and rear seat entertainment system.

=== Safety ===
The Pilot uses Honda's Advanced Compatibility Engineering front bracket. For the 2013 model year a rearview backup camera was made standard. The Insurance Institute for Highway Safety (IIHS) found the Honda Pilot's driver death rate of 2 deaths per million registered among the ten lowest released in their report

IIHS crash test scores:
Moderate overlap frontal offset	Good
Small overlap frontal offset	Poor*
Side impact	Good
Roof strength	Marginal (2009–11 models)
Roof strength	Good (2012 models)

^{*vehicle structure also rated "Poor"}

NHTSA 2011 Pilot^{†}:
Overall:	4/5 stars
Frontal Driver:	5/5 stars
Frontal Passenger:	4/5 stars
Side Driver:	4/5 stars
Side Passenger:	5/5 stars
Side Pole Driver:	5/5 stars
Rollover FWD:	/ 17.4%
Rollover AWD:	/ 16.4%

^{†}Because of more stringent tests, 2011 and newer model ratings are not comparable to pre–2011 ratings.

== Third generation (YF5/6; 2016) ==
Third generation
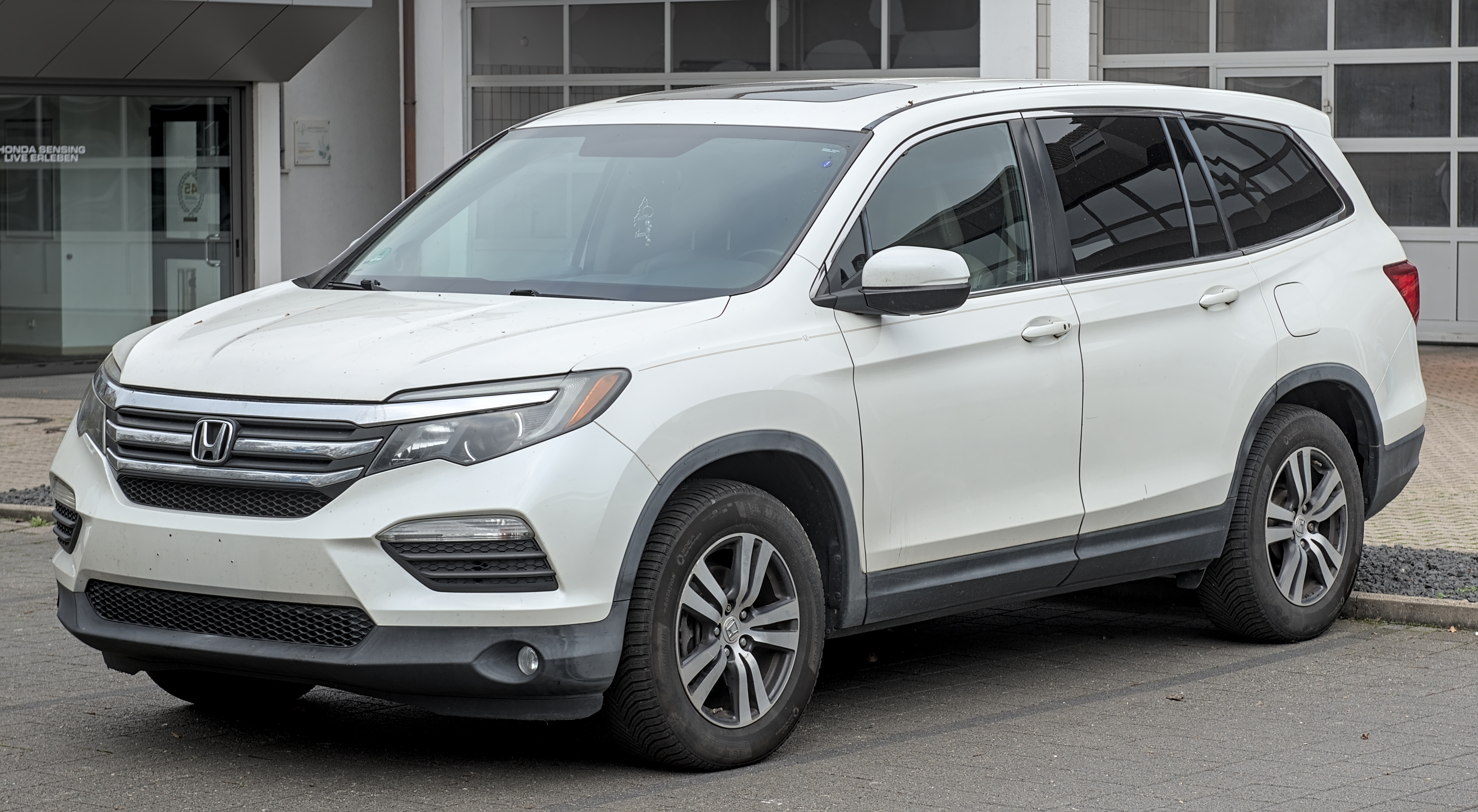

Overview
- Model code: YF5/6
- Production: May 2015 – December 2022
- Model years: 2016–2022
- Assembly: United States: Lincoln, Alabama (HMA)
- Designer: Ben Davidson, Bill Yex

Body and chassis
- Platform: Global Light Truck Platform 2 (GLTP2)
- Related: Acura MDX; Honda Odyssey; Honda Passport; Honda Ridgeline

Powertrain
- Engine: 3.5 L J35Y6 V6
- Transmission: 6-speed Honda H6 automatic (2016–2020); 9-speed ZF 9HP automatic (optional in 2016–2020, standard for 2021–2022)

Dimensions
- Wheelbase: 111.0 in (2,819 mm)
- Length: 196.5 in (4,991 mm)
- Width: 78.6 in (1,996 mm)
- Height: 2016-2018: 69.8 in (1,773 mm); 2019-2022: 70.7 in (1,796 mm)
- Curb weight: 4,054–4,140 lb (1,839–1,878 kg) (FWD); 4,220–4,317 lb (1,914–1,958 kg) (AWD)

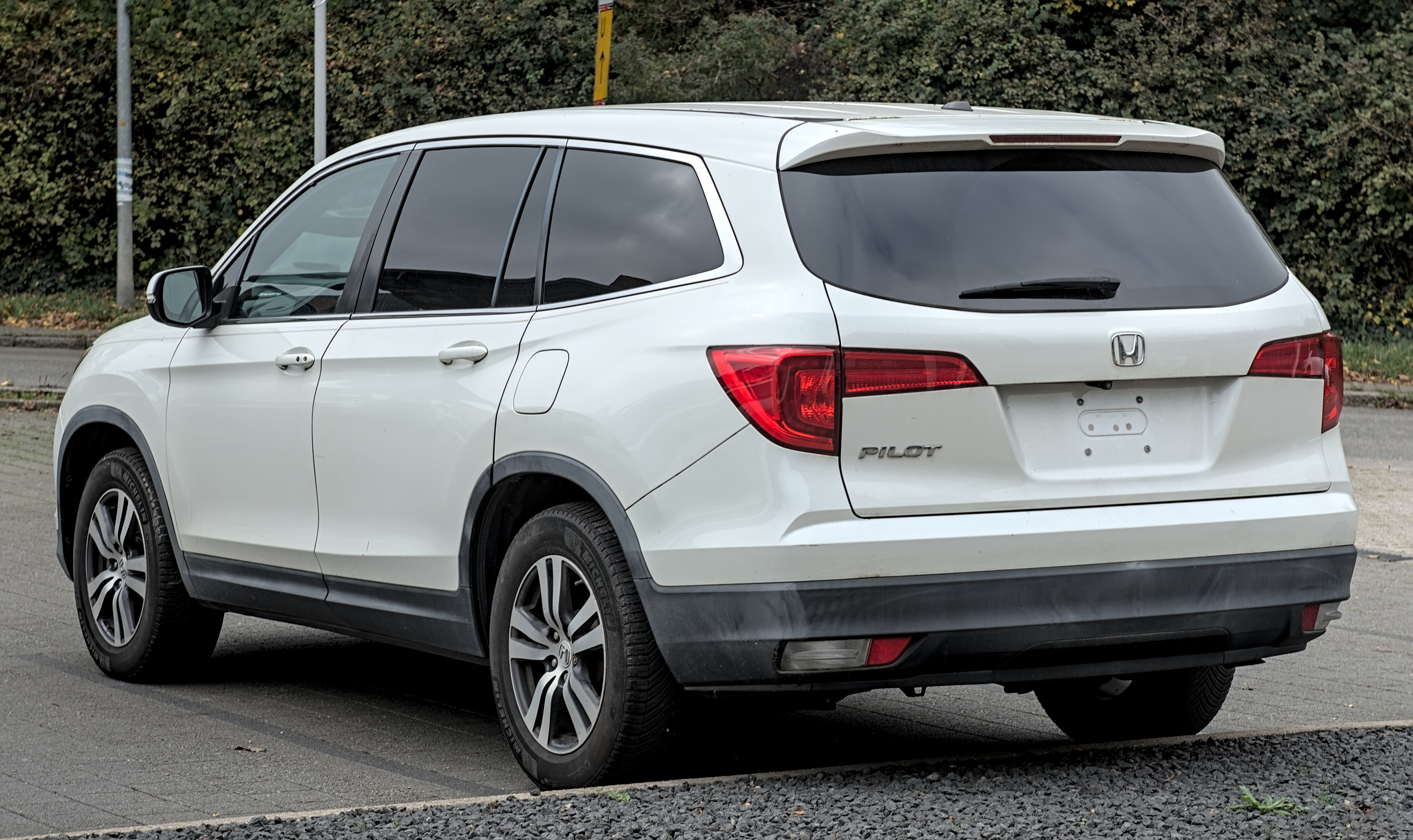
Rear view (pre-facelift)

The third-generation Pilot debuted at the Chicago Auto Show in February 2015, and production began in May. It was made available for sale on June 18, 2015 for the 2016 model year.

The exterior is sleeker in appearance compared to its boxier predecessor with a 10 percent reduction in drag area. Added to the exterior are standard LED brake and tail lights, LED daytime running lights (DRLs) on EX trims and above, and LED headlamps with automatic high-low beam switching the on new Elite model with special "Elite" badging. The Elite trim level also gained features that were new to the Pilot, including ventilated front seats, heated rear captain's chairs which reduced the seating capacity to seven from eight, and a panoramic roof. Alloy wheels became standard.

Newly available safety features include Honda's LaneWatch passenger-side mirror camera or Blind Spot Information (BSI) and rear Cross Traffic Monitor. Additional options, including Forward Collision Warning (FCW) with Collision Mitigation Braking System (CMBS), Lane Departure Warning (LDW) with Lane Keeping Assist System (LKAS) and Road Departure Mitigation (RDM), and Adaptive Cruise Control (ACC) are available as part of the Honda Sensing suite. A tri-angle backup camera is standard with dynamic guidelines optional.

The revised 3.5-liter V6 engine has direct-injection and a start-stop system (on the Touring and Elite trims) with improved power at 280 hp (209 kW; 284 PS), a 6-speed automatic is standard on the LX, EX, and EX-L trims while a ZF 9-speed automatic is standard on the Touring and Elite trims. With all-wheel drive models the amount of engine torque sent to each rear wheel is variable. EPA-estimated fuel economy is improved with front-wheel drive (FWD) 6-speed models registering 19 mpg_{‑US} (12 L/100 km)/27 mpg_{‑US} (8.7 L/100 km)/22 mpg_{‑US} (11 L/100 km), and all-wheel drive (AWD) models registering 18 mpg_{‑US} (13 L/100 km)/26 mpg_{‑US} (9.0 L/100 km)/21 mpg_{‑US} (11 L/100 km) (city/highway/combined). 9-speed models see fuel economy of 20 mpg_{‑US} (12 L/100 km)/27 mpg_{‑US} (8.7 L/100 km)/23 mpg_{‑US} (10 L/100 km) mpg in FWD configuration and 19 mpg_{‑US} (12 L/100 km)/26 mpg_{‑US} (9.0 L/100 km)/22 mpg_{‑US} (11 L/100 km) (city/highway/combined) in AWD configuration.

Though overall dimensions are smaller, the interior becomes more spacious modelled after the Odyssey, and weight is down approximately 300 lb (140 kg) with noise, vibration, and harshness (NVH) reduced. Structurally 21.3% of the Pilot's body is composed of 980, 1300 and 1,500 MPa ultra-high-strength steels, 5% is from aluminum or magnesium, an additional 34.5% is 270 MPa mild strength steel used in areas to minimize repair costs.

=== Model year changes ===
In 2016, for the 2017 model year, Apple CarPlay and Android Auto were added to all trims except for the base LX trim.

In June 2018, for the 2019 model year, Honda refreshed the Pilot inside and out. The powertrain for the Pilot has remained unchanged, but Honda did revise the nine-speed transmission and start-stop system that are only found on the Touring and Elite trims. The exterior featured new bumpers, grille, wheels, standard LED headlights, and revised tail lights. A hands-free tailgate became available. In the interior, the gauge cluster is replaced with a new one, similar to the one found on the Odyssey. The infotainment system is updated with the latest HondaLink software and it also features the CabinControl app (also found in the Odyssey). 4G LTE hotspot, CabinTalk, and a new rear entertainment system became available. The volume slider has also been replaced with a volume knob. Honda has replaced the steering wheel with a new design, also from the Odyssey. Honda Sensing became standard on all trim levels for the Pilot.

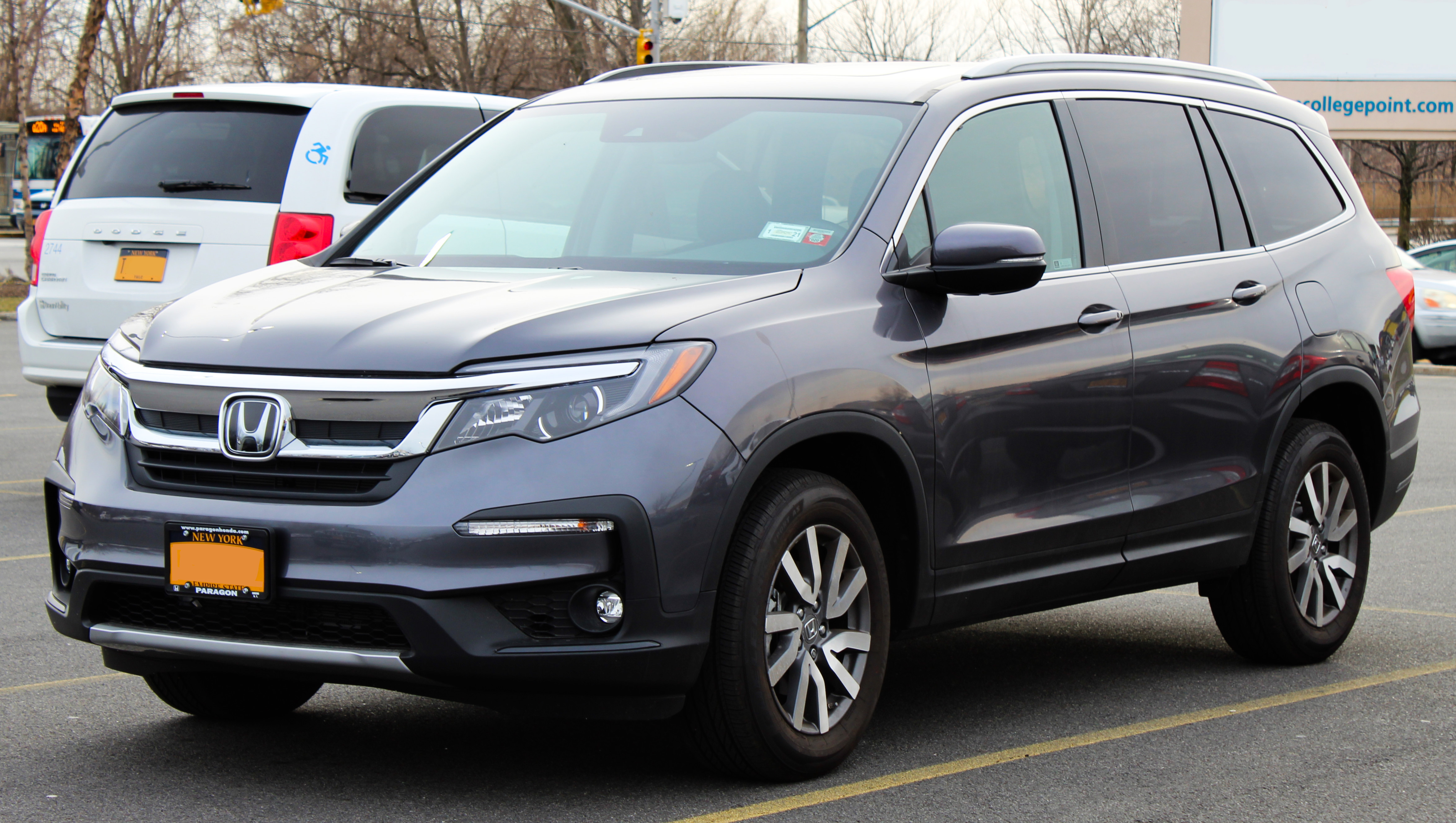
2019 Pilot EX-L (facelift)

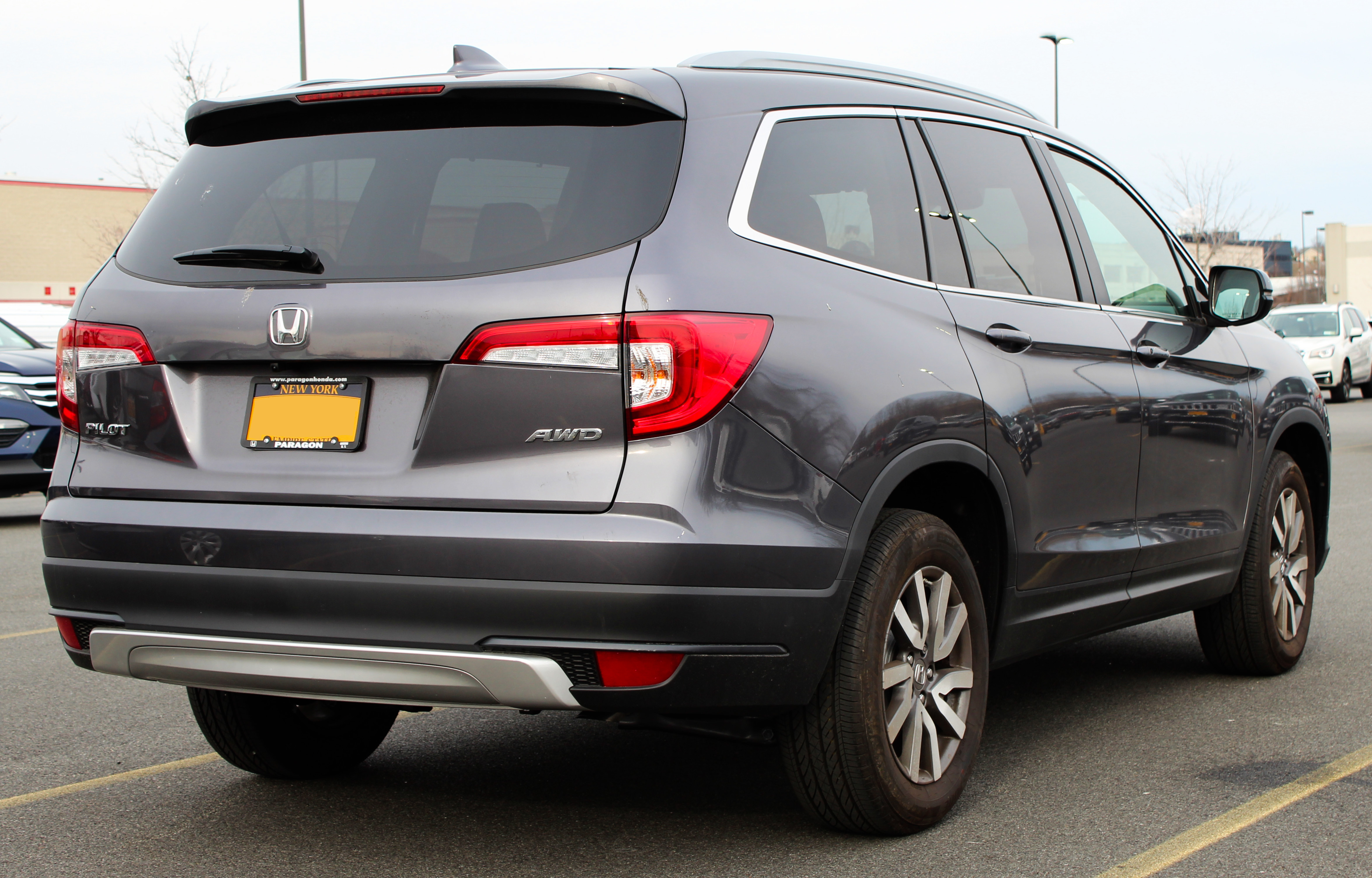
Rear view (facelift)

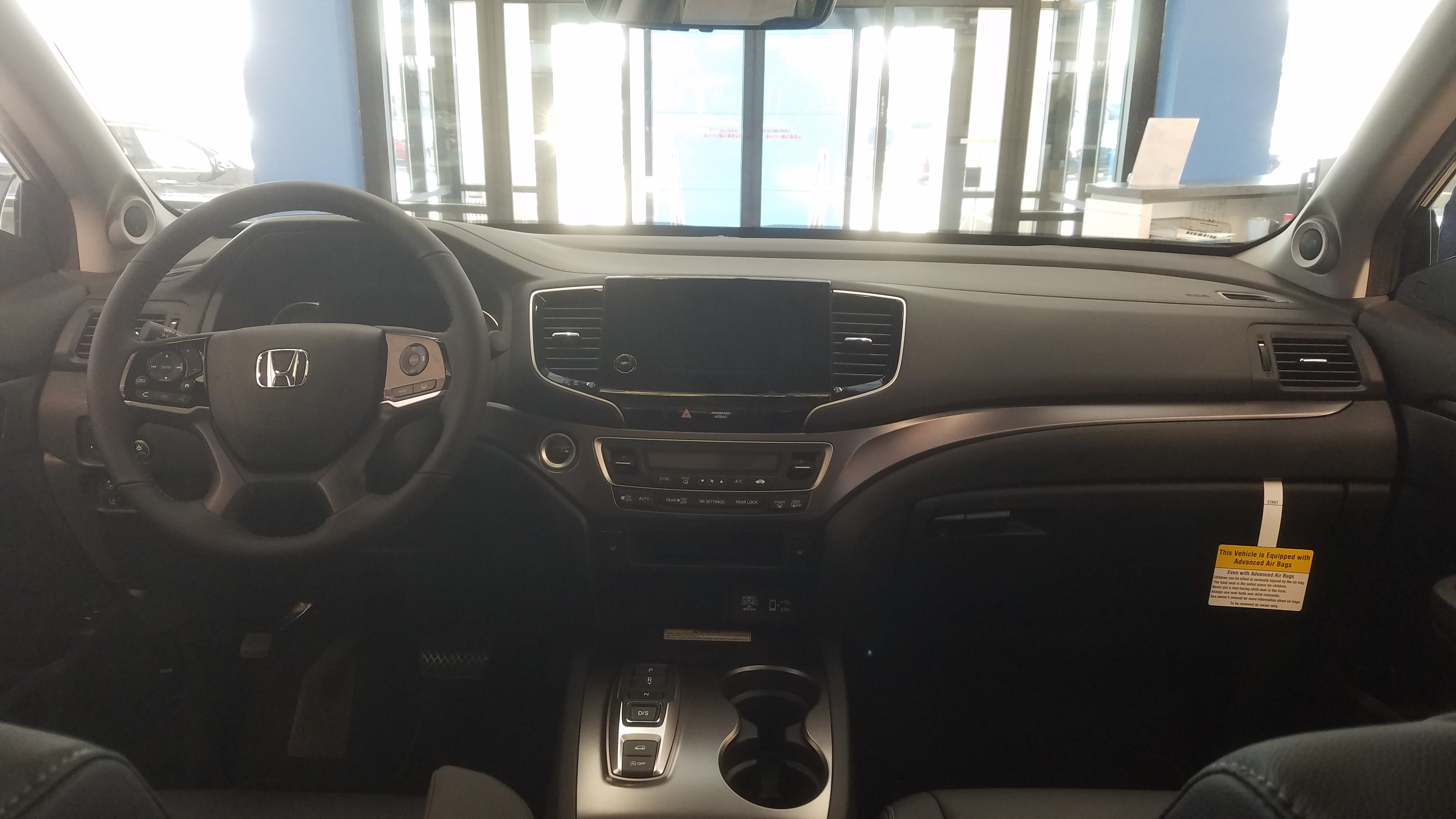
Interior (facelift)

In July 2019, for the 2020 model year, a new Black Edition trim was added to the lineup.

In June 2020, for the 2021 model year, the 9-speed transmission became standard on all trim levels, and a Special Edition is slotted between EX-L and Touring trims.

In 2021, for the 2022 model year, Honda introduced an entry-level Sport trim and a new TrailSport off-road oriented trim. The Sport trim replaced the discontinued LX and EX trim levels. The TrailSport exterior features include a suspension lift that increases ground clearance by 0.6 in (15.2 mm), black exterior trim, 18-inch alloy-wheels, and an orange and black TrailSport badge. On the interior, TrailSport models include TrailSport logos on seats and orange stitching. Other changes for 2022 Pilot models include the 8-inch infotainment system and LED headlights becoming standard equipment and the introduction of a new Sonic Gray Pearl exterior paint color.

=== Safety ===
IIHS - 2016 Pilot
Moderate overlap frontal offset	Good
Small overlap frontal offset	Good^{1}
Side impact	Good
Roof strength	Good^{2}
Headlights (LX, EX, EX-L, Touring)	Poor
Headlights (Elite)	Acceptable

^{1} vehicle structure also rated "Good".
^{2} strength-to-weight ratio: 5.22

NHTSA - 2016 Pilot
Overall:	5/5 stars
Frontal Driver:	5/5 stars
Frontal Passenger:	4/5 stars
Side Driver:	5/5 stars
Side Passenger:	5/5 stars
Side Pole Driver:	5/5 stars
Rollover FWD:	/ 17.5%
Rollover AWD:	/ 16.4%

== Fourth generation (YG1/2; 2023) ==
Fourth generation
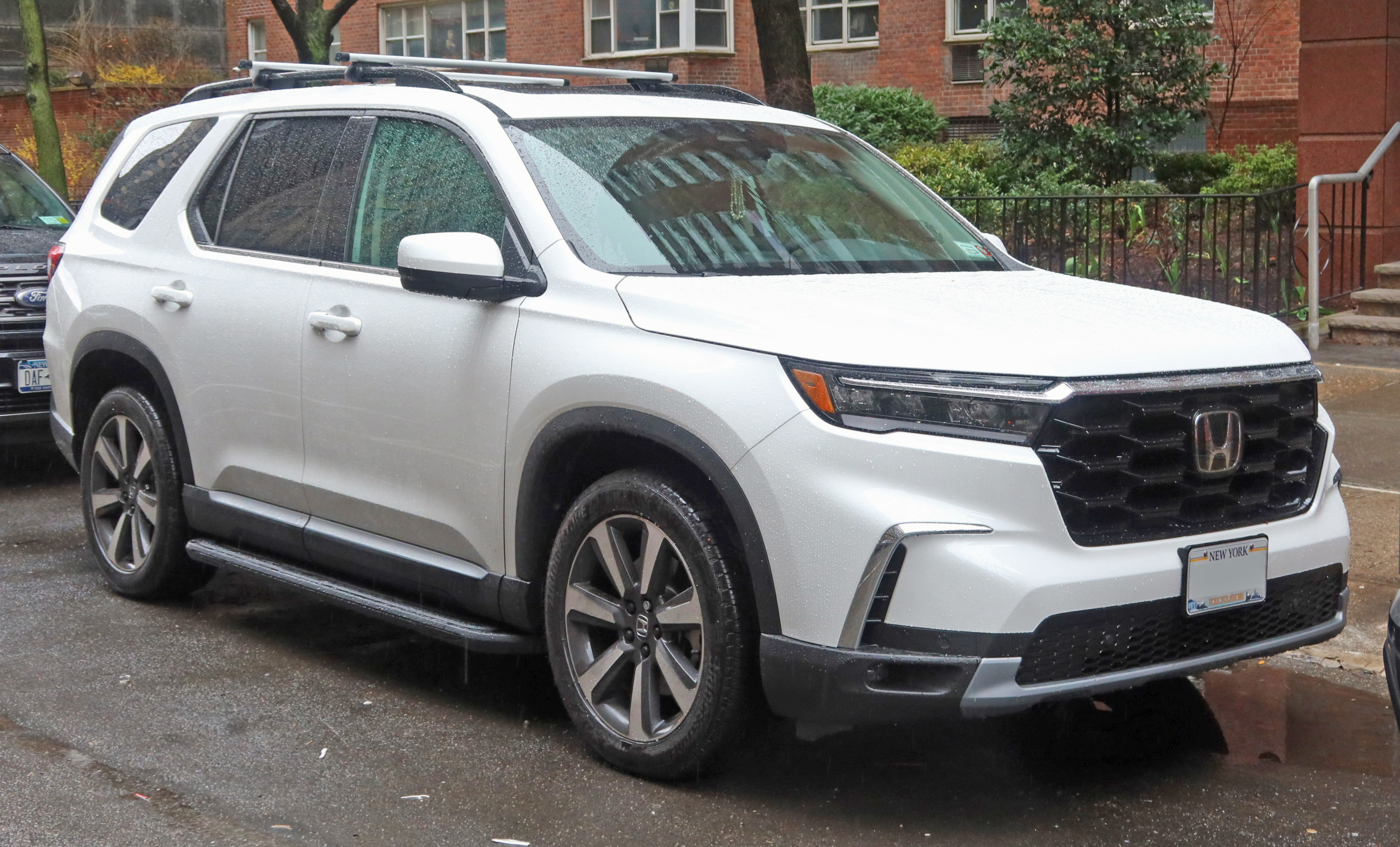
- 2023 Honda Pilot Touring (YG1, US)

Overview
- Model code: YG1/2
- Production: December 2022 – present
- Model years: 2023–present
- Assembly: United States: Lincoln, Alabama (HMA)

Body and chassis
- Platform: Honda PF7
- Related: Honda Passport (fourth generation); Acura MDX (fourth generation)

Powertrain
- Engine: 3.5 L J35Y8 V6
- Transmission: 10-speed automatic

Dimensions
- Wheelbase: 113.8 in (2,891 mm)
- Length: 199.9 in (5,077 mm)
- Width: 78.5 in (1,994 mm)
- Height: 71.0 in (1,803 mm)

The fourth-generation Pilot made its debut on November 7, 2022. It went on sale on December 12, 2022 for the 2023 model year. A DOHC (non-VTEC) 3.5-liter J35Y8 V6 engine with 285 horsepower (213 kW; 289 PS) and 262 lb⋅ft (355 N⋅m) of torque powers this generation Honda Pilot replacing the previous J35Y6 V6 engine. It is paired to a Honda ten-speed automatic gearbox which replaces the ZF 9HP automatic gearbox. This generation of Pilot contends directly with Toyota's 2023 Grand Highlander, becoming bigger in size while keeping the sleek body for reduced drag and weight. At launch, there were six distinct trim levels available: LX, Sport, EX-L, TrailSport, Touring, and Elite. In March 2024, for the 2025 model year, Honda reintroduced the Black Edition (available on the 2020-2022 model year Pilots) trim level to the Pilot. The Black Edition includes 20-inch black alloy wheels, black trim and emblems, red trimmed interior, red LED ambient lighting, Black Edition on seats, and more. The 2025 model year saw the LX trim being discontinued, with the Sport becoming the entry-level trim.

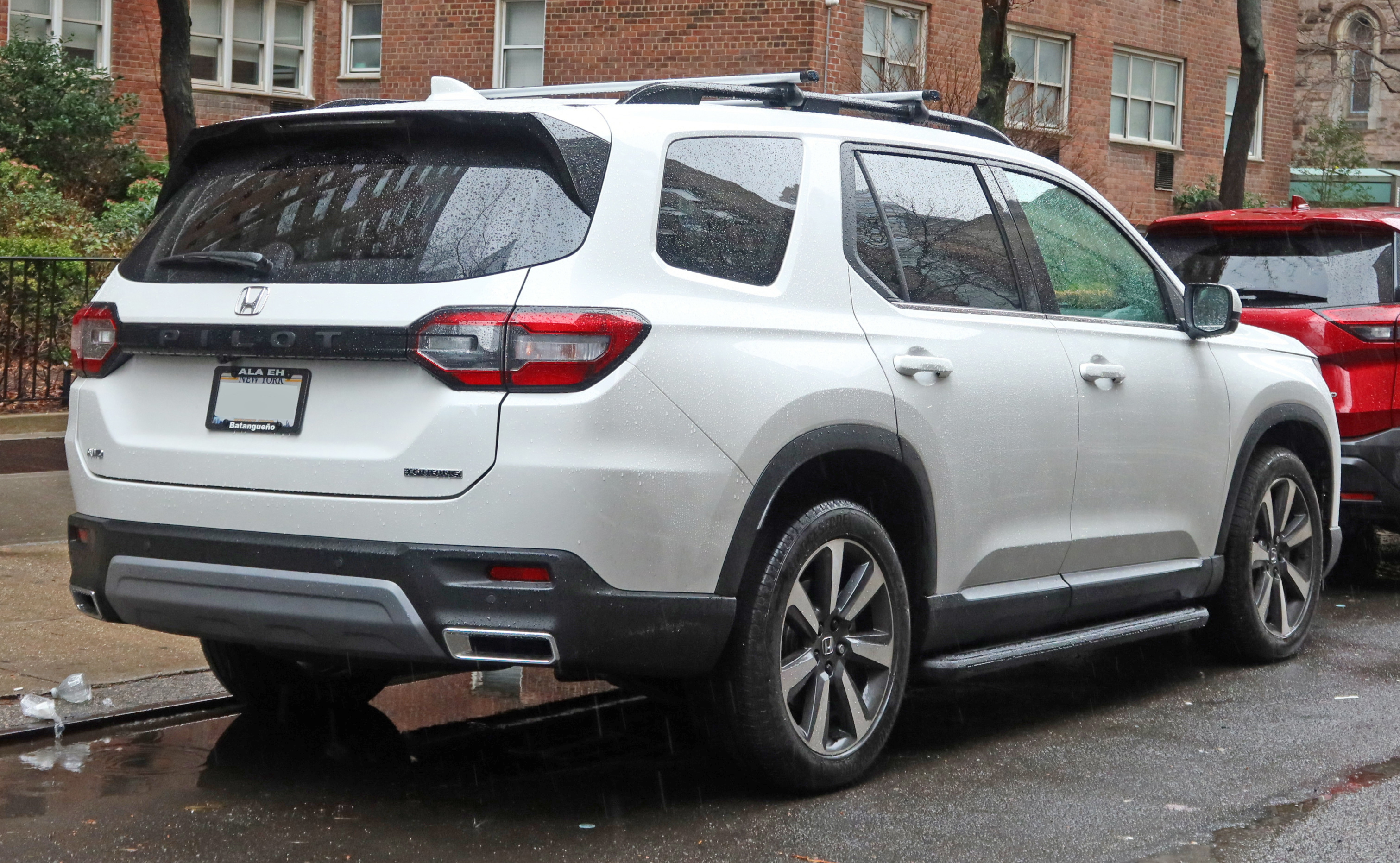
Rear view

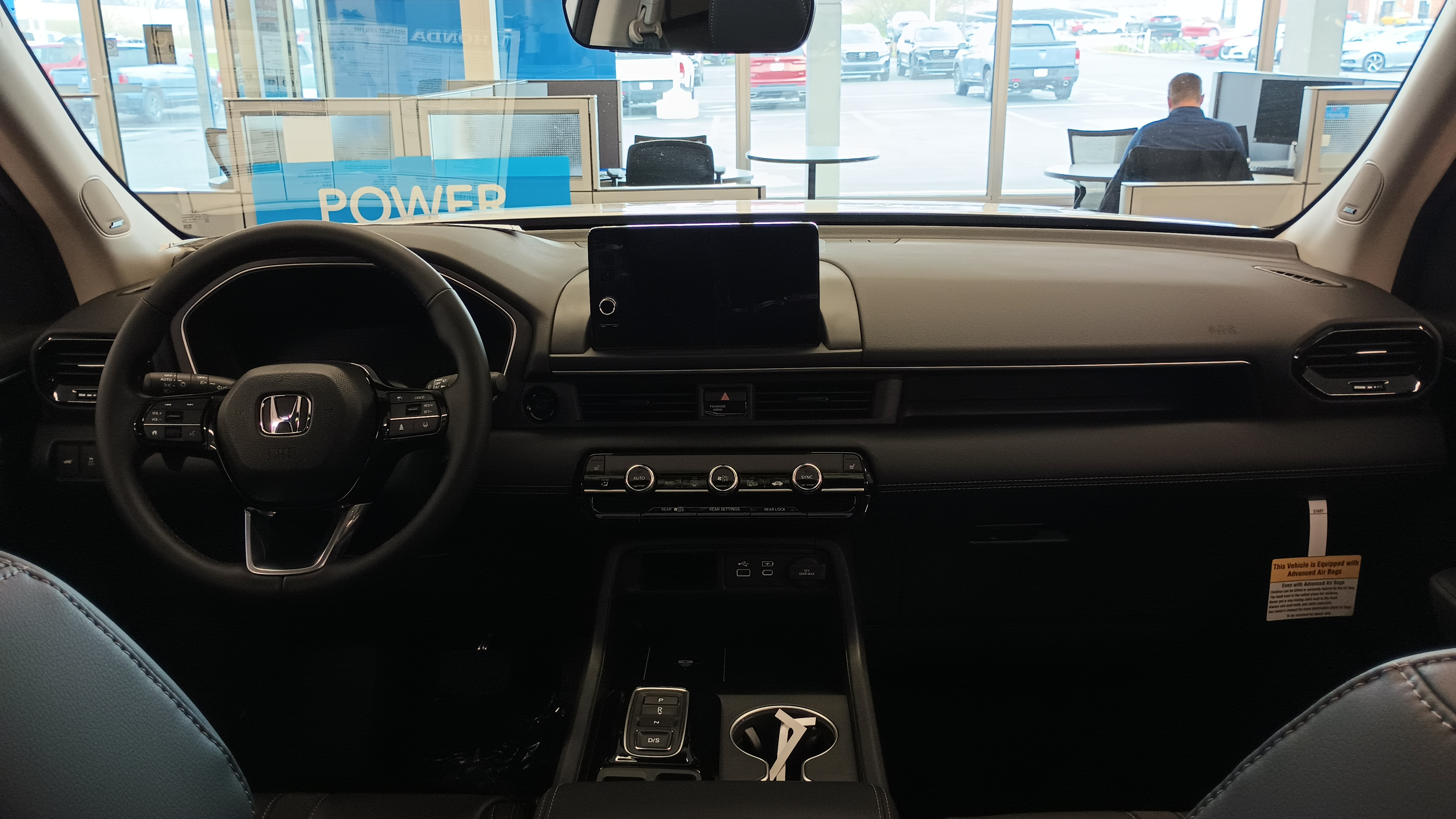
Interior

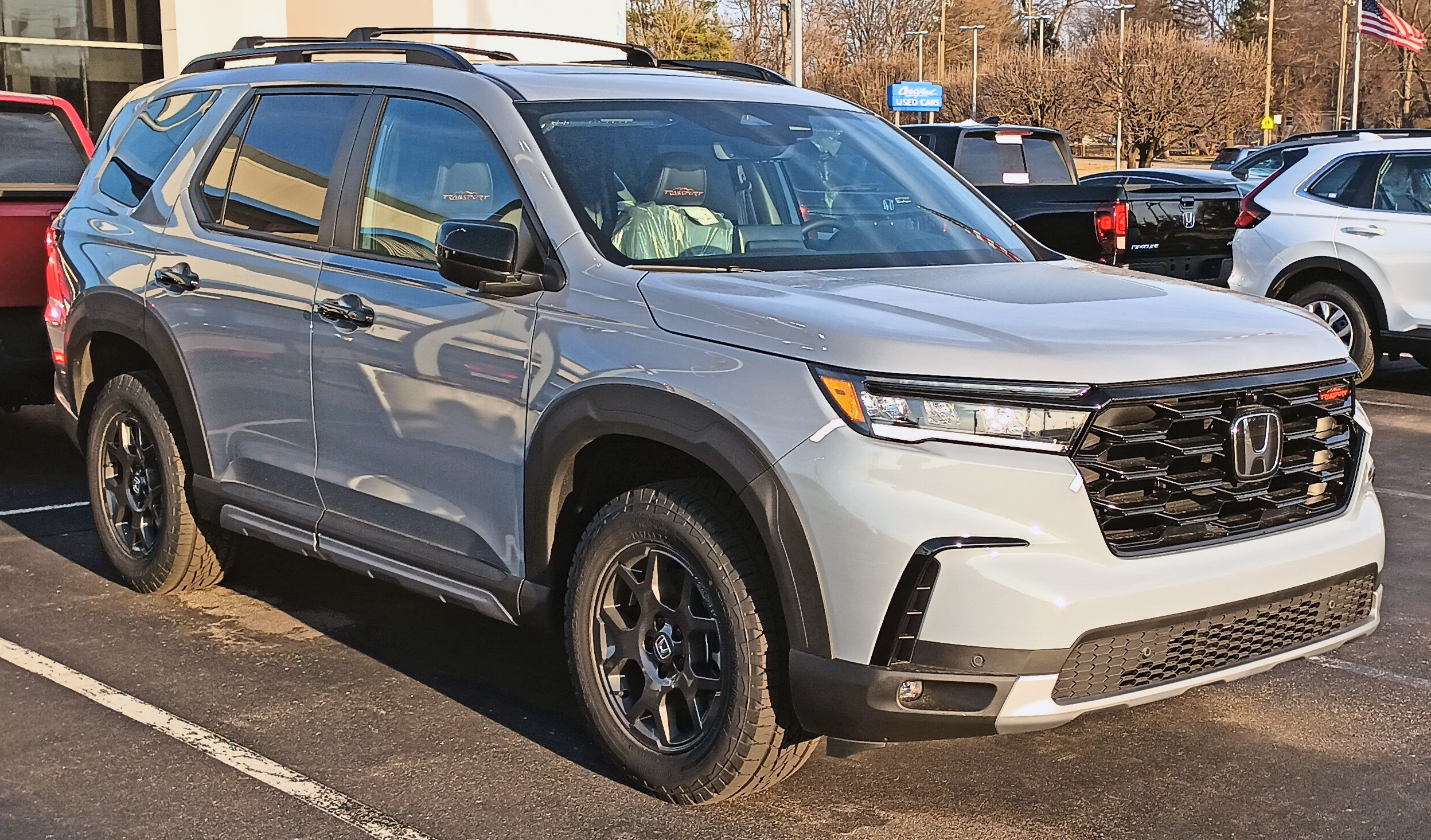
2023 Pilot TrailSport (front)

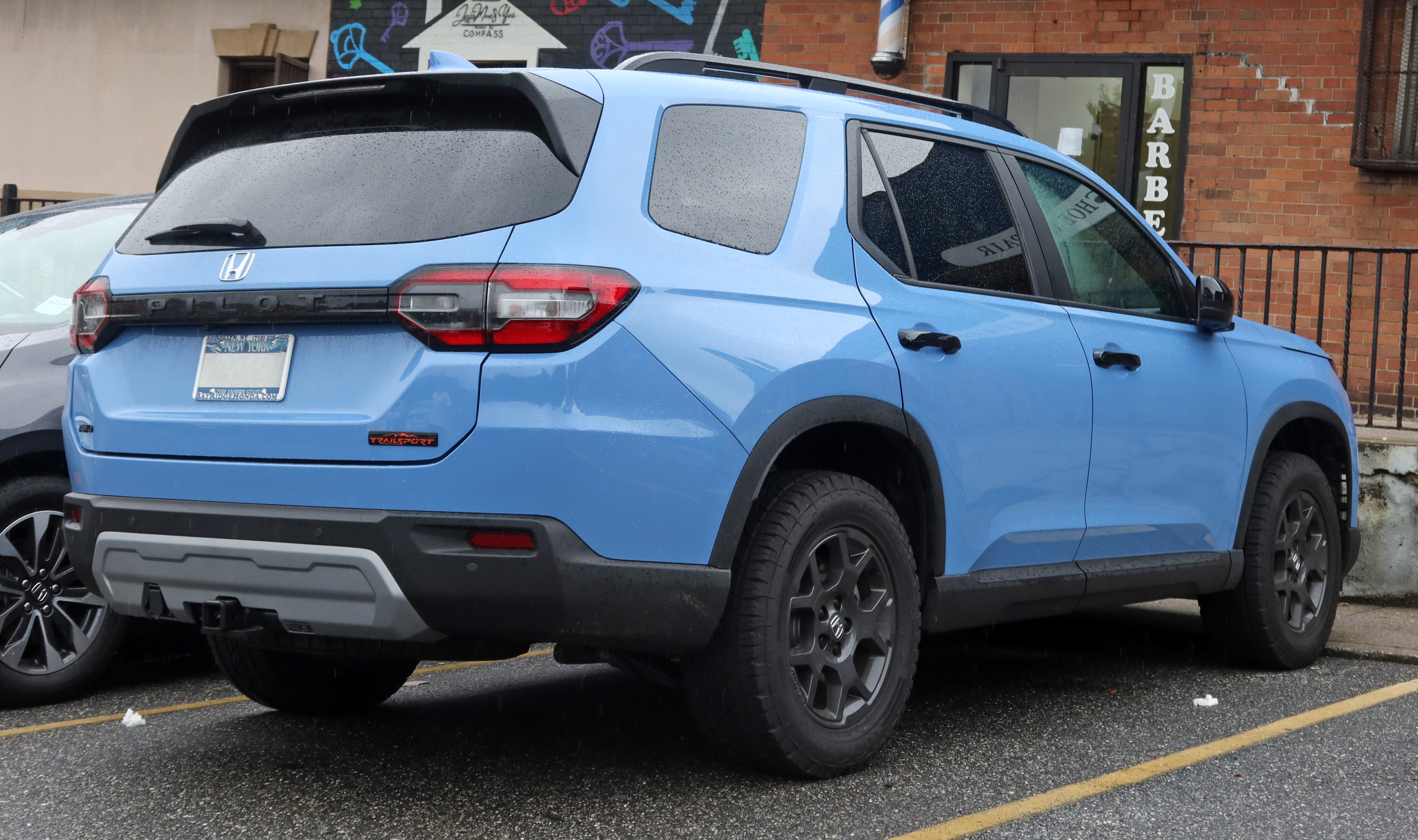
2023 Pilot TrailSport (rear)

=== Facelift (2026) ===
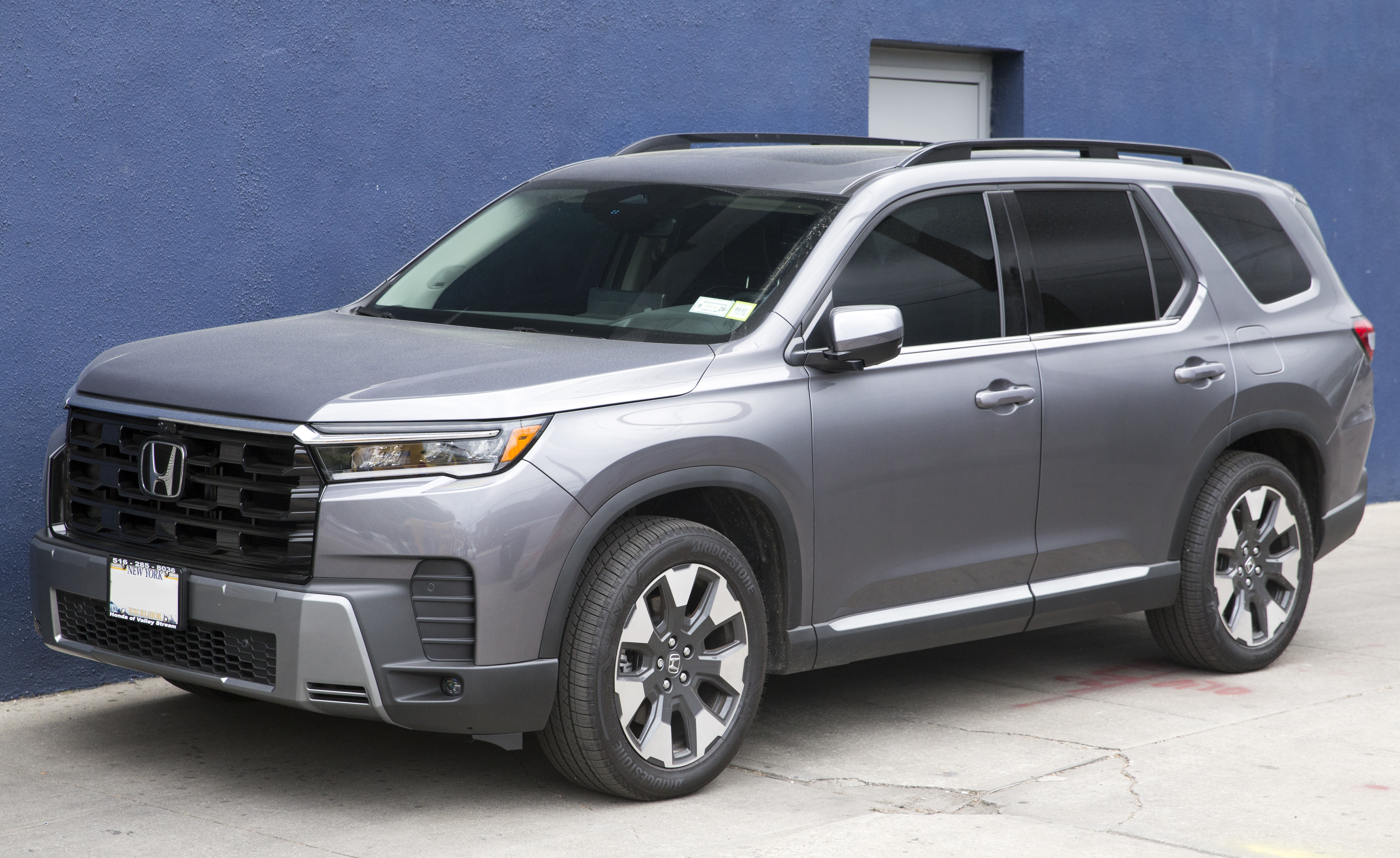
2026 Pilot Elite (facelift)

The 2026 model year Pilot refresh was unveiled on November 18, 2025. The refresh saw a redesigned front fascia with a larger grille, new exterior colors, a larger 10.2-inch Digital Instrument Cluster (43% larger than the pre-facelift model), all models received a new larger 12.3-inch touchscreen (37% larger than the pre-facelift model) with a new Human Machine Interface (HMI) software, wireless compatibility for Android Auto and Apple CarPlay, new interior upholsteries, the addition of insulation materials to reduce engine, road and wind noise, improvised standard equipment across the line-up and a new Post-Collision Braking system.

The TrailSport model for the Pilot was also refreshed for the 2026 model year. The TrailSport model features 18-inch alloy wheels wrapped in all-terrain tires, an off-road tuned suspension with additional ground clearance, tow hooks, a trailer-hitch receiver, a re-tuned electric power steering system, additional drive modes, TrailSport badge on the front grille and tailgate, metallic silver front and rear scuff plates, brown leather upholstery with orange stitching, heated second-row seats, a panoramic moonroof, and a 360-degree camera with off-road views.

=== Safety ===
The 2023 Pilot was awarded the "Top Safety Pick +" by the Insurance Institute for Highway Safety.

IIHS scores
Small overlap front (driver)	Good
Small overlap front (passenger)	Good
Moderate overlap front (original test)	Good
Moderate overlap front (updated test)	Marginal
Side impact	Good
Headlights	Good
Front crash prevention: vehicle-to-pedestrian (Day)	Superior
Front crash prevention: vehicle-to-pedestrian (Night)	Superior
Seat belt reminders	Good
Child seat anchors (LATCH) ease of use	Good+

== Sales ==
Calendar year	US	Canada
2002	52,062	3,396
2003	106,917	4,608
2004	128,158	4,730
2005	143,353	5,213
2006	152,154	5,359
2007	117,146	4,328
2008	106,746	5,564
2009	183,901	4,452
2010	102,323	5,062
2011	116,297	4,366
2012	114,848	5,807
2013	126,678	6,356
2014	108,857	6,113
2015	136,212	8,230
2016	120,772	7,279
2017	127,279	8,905
2018	159,615	8,072
2019	135,008	8,241
2020	123,813	7,709
2021	143,062	7,398
2022	99,567	6,445
2023	110,298	6,619
2024	141,245	
2025	124,209	
