= This Is the Army (musical) =

1942–45 American musical revue

This Is The Army
- The New All-Soldier Show
- This Is The Army Sheet Music
- Music: Irving Berlin
- Lyrics: Irving Berlin
- Basis: Irving Berlin's play Yip Yip Yaphank
- Productions: 1942 Broadway; 1943-1945 traveling show

This Is The Army is an American musical revue in two acts, designed to boost morale in the U.S. during World War II, with a book by James McColl and music and lyrics by Irving Berlin. It was produced by the U.S. Army on Broadway in 1942, with a cast of U.S. soldiers, for the benefit of the Army Emergency Relief Fund.

== Production ==
The revue ran on Broadway, at the Broadway Theatre, from July 4, 1942, to September 26, 1942, for 113 performances.

The Internet Broadway Database names the production team: “Music by Irving Berlin; Book by James McColl and Irving Berlin; Lyrics by Irving Berlin; Musical Director: Milton Rosenstock; Dialogue for Minstrel Show by Pvt. Jack Mendelsohn, Pfc. Richard Burdick and Pvt. Tom McDonnell; Music arrangements for dances by Pvt. Melvin Pahl. Directed by Sgt. Ezra Stone; Choreographed by Cpl. Nelson Barclift and Sgt. Robert Sidney; Additional direction by Joshua Logan; Military Formations by Chester O'Brien. Scenic Design by Pvt. John Koenig; Costume Design by Pvt. John Koenig.” The opening night program gives Rosenstock, who was directing the orchestra, the rank of Corporal.

== Background ==
In May 1941, 7 months before the U.S. joined the fighting in World War II, former Sergeant Irving Berlin was on a tour that took him to his old Army base, Camp Upton in Yaphank, New York. He spoke with the commanding officers, including Capt. Doc Rankin of Special Services, about restaging Berlin's 1917 Army play Yip Yip Yaphank. Gen. George Marshall approved a Broadway production of a wartime musical for the Army, allowing Berlin to make the arrangements and hold rehearsals at Camp Upton, much as he had done during World War I. Sgt. Ezra Stone was selected as director of the new version of the play. They put together the story and crew on weekdays.

Berlin insisted on racial integration and was permitted to add African Americans into this play, which he was not allowed to do in Yip Yip Yaphank. This was unconventional for the United States Army at the time. However, whites and African Americans still did not appear on stage together. According to the opening night program, the show was supposed to open with a military minstrel show. Prologue Magazine reports that "initially, [Berlin] expected the first half hour of This Is the Army to recreate a minstrel show, which was the way he had kicked off Yip Yip Yaphank – 110 men sitting on bleachers, and everyone in blackface. Ezra Stone, the director, was indignant. 'Mr. Berlin,' he said, 'I know the heritage of the minstrel show. Those days are gone. People don't do that anymore.' 'No, no, that's nonsense,' the songwriter replied. After considerable discussion, Stone adopted another approach to convince Berlin to skip the minstrel segment: 'How can we have 110 guys in blackface and then get them out of blackface for the rest of the show?' So Berlin devised a song for the Black soldiers, based on "Puttin' on the Ritz", calling it "What the Well-Dressed Man in Harlem Will Wear" (various U.S. Army uniforms).

== Production and reception ==
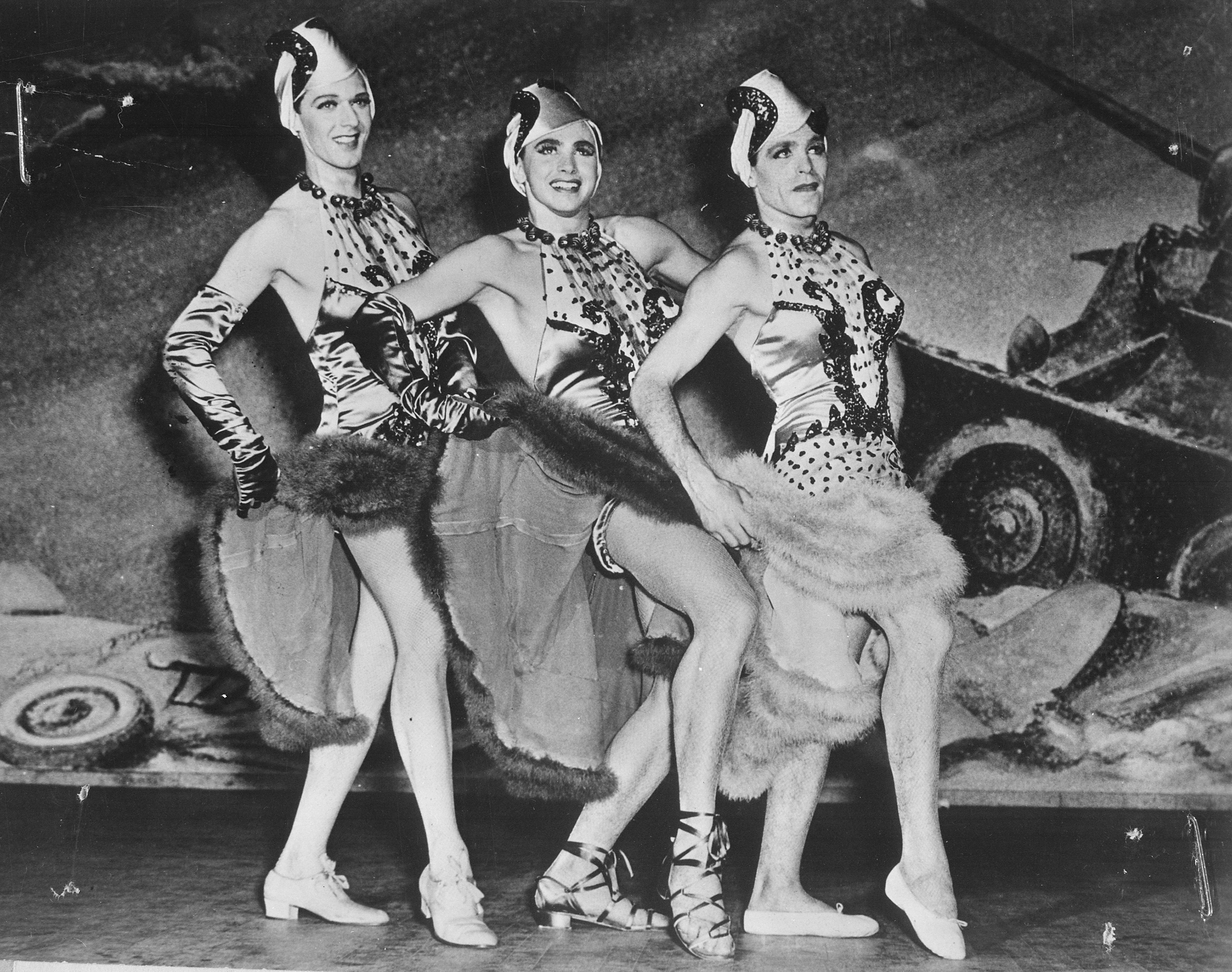
This Is The Army made $40,000 a week for Army Relief.

The opening night cast consisted of 300 actors, including Berlin, Burl Ives, and Stone (the director). The show was a great success, with an opening night gross of $45,000, which, according to The New York Times, "probably is a world's record for an opening night." It was supposed to run for four weeks (to August 4, 1942) and instead ran for 12 weeks (to September 26, 1942). The New York Times article went on to say "it became evident to all concerned that there was the best show of a generation." Brooks Atkinson, writing in The New York Times a month later, said, "No wonder This Is the Army leaves the audience in a glow of enjoyment and loyalty. For Mr. Berlin's taste is perfect ... he has contributed another memorable show to the genius of America."

== Touring company ==
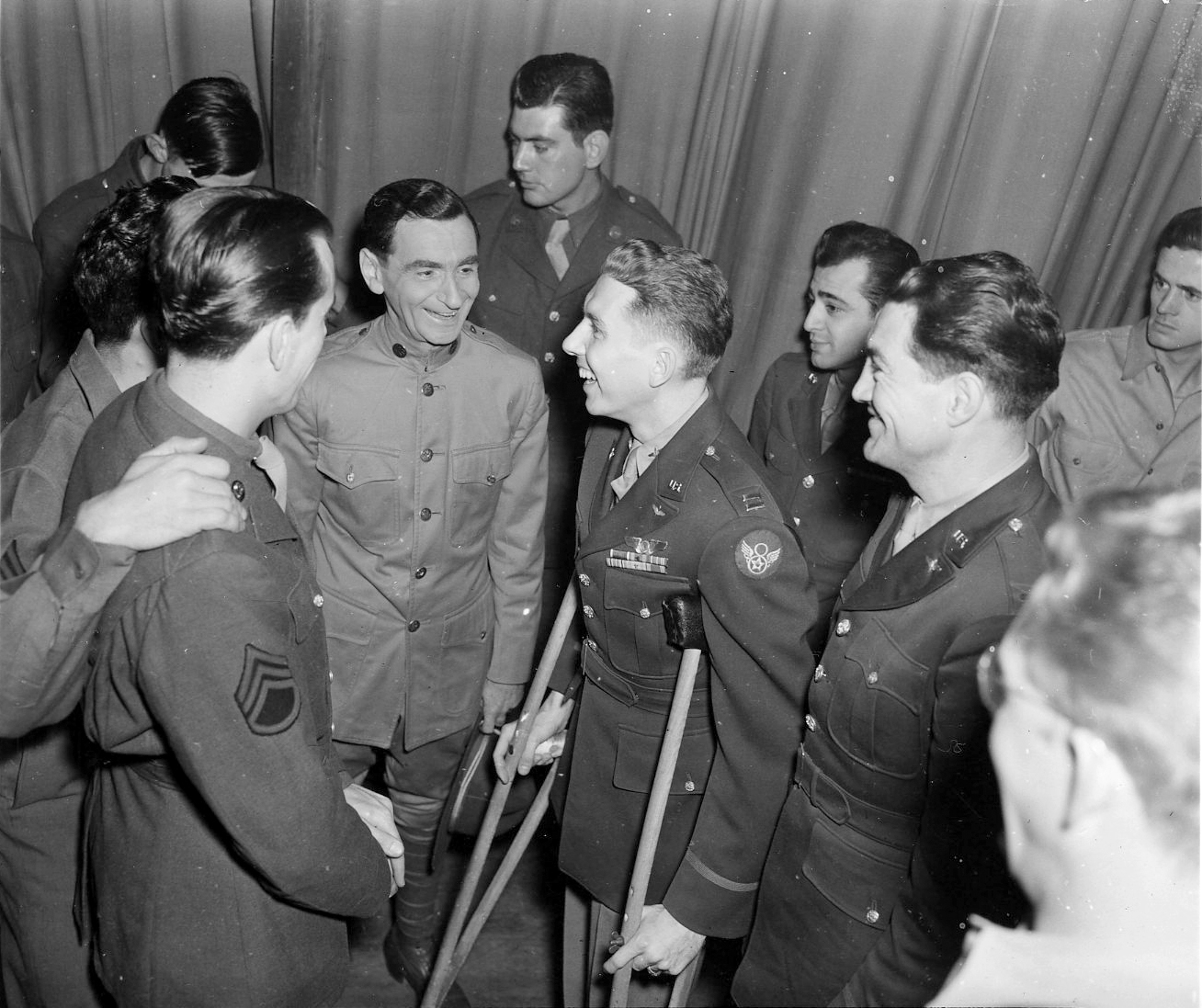
In January 1944, Berlin skipped the first performance of This Is the Army in Bristol, to visit and bring back a hospitalized bombardier and former Broadway hoofer who lost his leg in battle. The airman is shown here, visiting old friends backstage.

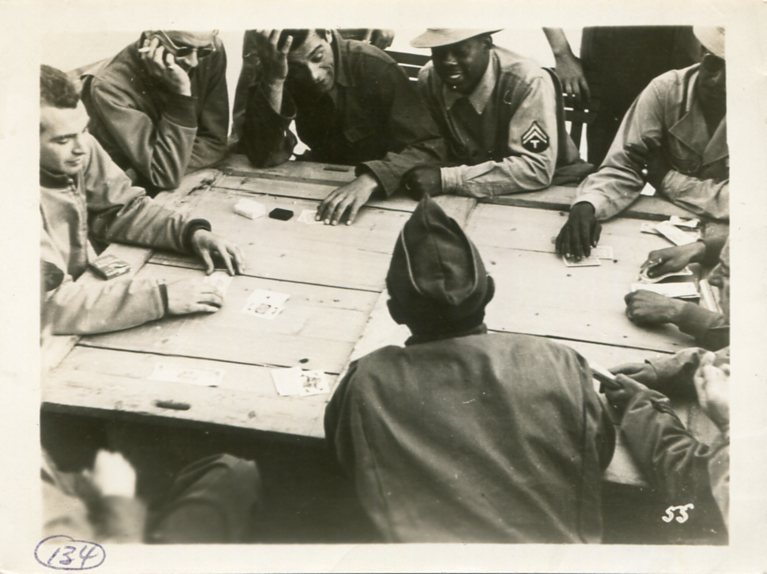
Cast members of the touring company of This Is The Army play blackjack in Italy (May 1944)

Because the show was such a success, it went on the road. The first national tour of the revue went to Washington, D.C., and Philadelphia before continuing to Baltimore, Boston, Cleveland, Cincinnati, St. Louis, Detroit, Chicago, and Los Angeles, ending in San Francisco on February 13, 1943. By that time, it had earned $2 million (equal to $37,211,538 today) for the Army Emergency Relief Fund. The company of men that staged the play were the only fully integrated U.S. Army outfit—except on stage.

The show toured the UK in 1943, appearing at the London Palladium from November 10 to 27 before playing at the Glasgow Empire for a week beginning November 30. Irving Berlin appeared, but some numbers were changed for the UK production. Milton Rosenstock was the musical director. In the "What the Well-dressed Man in Harlem Will Wear” number, James Cross danced with Billy Yates. A note in the Glasgow programme, written by European Theater of Operations commanding general Lt. Gen. Jacob L Devers, said: "following their tour of Great Britain...(the cast of 150 American soldiers)… will be sent to Africa to play before Allied soldiers, then will join America's fighting forces". Proceeds of the British tour were given to British service charities, and it was also stipulated that "the soldiers of our Allies, as well as all American enlisted men, should see this Army show free of cost."

The end of the war saw the end of the roadshow. The last performance took place on the island of Maui, Hawaii, on October 22, 1945, with Irving Berlin once again singing his "Oh! How I Hate to Get Up in the Morning". The Army Emergency Relief Fund collected millions of dollars, but the total amount was never accounted for, nor released to the public.

== Musical numbers ==
According to the opening night program:

Act I

1. A Military Minstrel Show

- "Opening Chorus"
- "This Is the Army"
- "I'm Getting Tired So I Can Sleep"
- "My Sergeant and I"
- "I Left My Heart at the Stage Door Canteen"
- "The Army’s Made a Man Out of Me"
- "Mandy"

2. A Military Vaudeville Show

- "Ladies of the Chorus"
- "That Russian Winter"
- "What the Well Dressed Man in Harlem Will Wear"
- "Finale Act I"

Act II

- "American Eagles"
- "Head in the Clouds"
- "Reprise - "I'm Getting Tired"
- "Stage Door Canteen"
- "Aryans Under the Skin"
- "A Soldier’s Dream"
- "Oh! How I Hate to Get Up in the Morning"
- "This Time"

== Sources ==
- Mantle, Burns (ed.) The Best Plays of 1942–1943, Dodd, Mead & Company, New York, 1943.
- Ewen, David. Complete Book of the American Musical Theater, (2nd Ed.) Henry Holt and Company, New York, 1959, pp. 27–29.
