= Irving Berlin =

American songwriter (1888–1989)

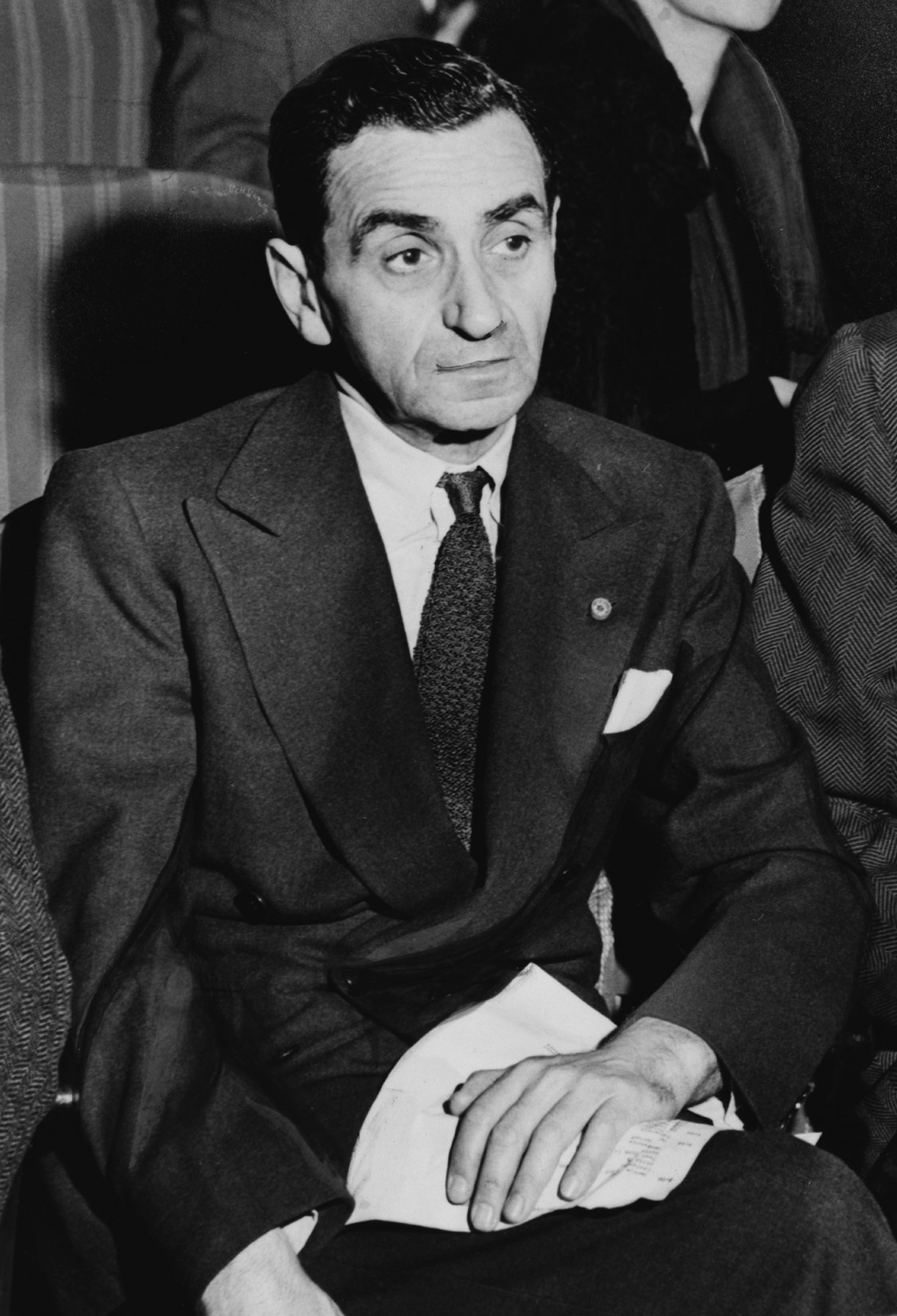
- Berlin in 1948
- Born: Israel Isidore Beilin; May 11, 1888; Tyumen, Russia
- Died: September 22, 1989 (aged 101); New York City, U.S.
- Occupation: Songwriter
- Spouses: Dorothy Goetz (m. 1912; died 1912) Ellin Mackay (m. 1926; died 1988)
- Children: 4, including Mary Ellin Barrett
- Musical career
- Genres: Popular songs; ragtime; Broadway musicals; show tunes
- Years active: 1907–1971
- Military career
- Allegiance: United States
- Branch: United States Army
- Service years: 1918–1919
- Rank: Sergeant
- Unit: 152d Depot Brigade
- Conflicts: World War I

Signature
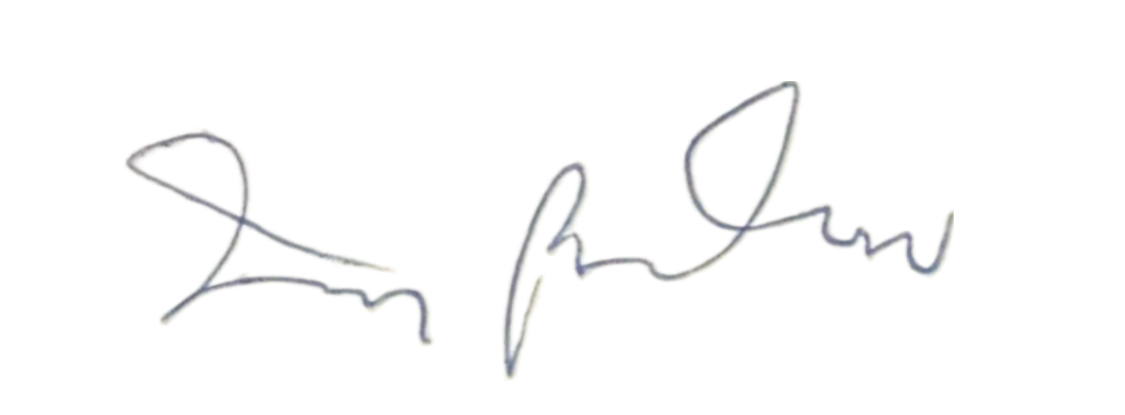

Irving Berlin (born Israel Isidore Beilin; (Note: Yiddish: ישראל איזידור ביילין; Russian: Израиль Моисеевич Бейлин, romanized: Izrail Moiseyevich Beylin.) May 11, 1888 – September 22, 1989) was a Russian-born American songwriter and composer. His music forms a large part of the Great American Songbook. Berlin received numerous honors including an Academy Award, a Grammy Award, and a Tony Award. He also received the Presidential Medal of Freedom from President Gerald R. Ford in 1977. The broadcast journalist Walter Cronkite stated he "helped write the story of this country, capturing the best of who we are and the dreams that shape our lives".

Born in Russia, Berlin arrived in the United States at the age of five. His family left Russia to escape pogroms against the Jewish village of Tolochin. He published his first song, "Marie from Sunny Italy", in 1907, receiving 33 cents for the publishing rights, and became known as the composer of numerous international hits, starting with 1911's "Alexander's Ragtime Band". He also was an owner of the Music Box Theatre on Broadway. For much of his career, Berlin could not read sheet music, and was such a limited piano player that he could only play in the key of F♯; he used his custom piano equipped with a transposing lever when he needed to play in keys other than F♯. He was known for writing music and lyrics in the American vernacular: uncomplicated, simple and direct, with his stated aim being to "reach the heart of the average American", whom he saw as the "real soul of the country".

He wrote hundreds of songs, many becoming major hits, which made him famous before he turned thirty. During his 60-year career he wrote an estimated 1,500 songs, including the scores for 20 original Broadway shows and 15 original Hollywood films, with his songs nominated eight times for Academy Awards. Many songs became popular themes and anthems, including "God Bless America", "Alexander's Ragtime Band", "Blue Skies", "Easter Parade", "Puttin' on the Ritz", "Cheek to Cheek", "White Christmas", "Happy Holiday", "Anything You Can Do (I Can Do Better)", and "There's No Business Like Show Business". His Broadway musical This Is the Army (1942) was adapted into the 1943 film of the same name.

Berlin's songs have reached the top of the US charts 25 times and have been extensively re-recorded by numerous singers. Berlin died in 1989 at the age of 101. Composer Douglas Moore sets Berlin apart from all other contemporary songwriters, and includes him instead with Stephen Foster, Walt Whitman, and Carl Sandburg, as a "great American minstrel"—someone who has "caught and immortalized in his songs what we say, what we think about, and what we believe." Composer George Gershwin called him "the greatest songwriter that has ever lived", and composer Jerome Kern concluded that "Irving Berlin has no place in American music—he is American music."

== Early life ==
=== Life in Russia ===
Berlin was born Israel Beilin (also transliterated as Bailin) on May 11, 1888, in the Russian Empire to a Jewish family. Although his family came from the shtetl of Tolochin (in present-day Belarus), Berlin later learned that he was probably born in Tyumen, Siberia, where his father, an itinerant cantor, had taken his family. He was one of eight children of Moses (1848–1901) and Lena Lipkin Beilin (1850–1922).

According to biographer Laurence Bergreen, as an adult Berlin admitted to no memories of his first five years in Russia except for one: "he was lying on a blanket by the side of a road, watching his house burn to the ground. By daylight the house was in ashes." As an adult, Berlin said he was unaware of being raised in abject poverty since he had known no other life.

=== Settling in New York City ===
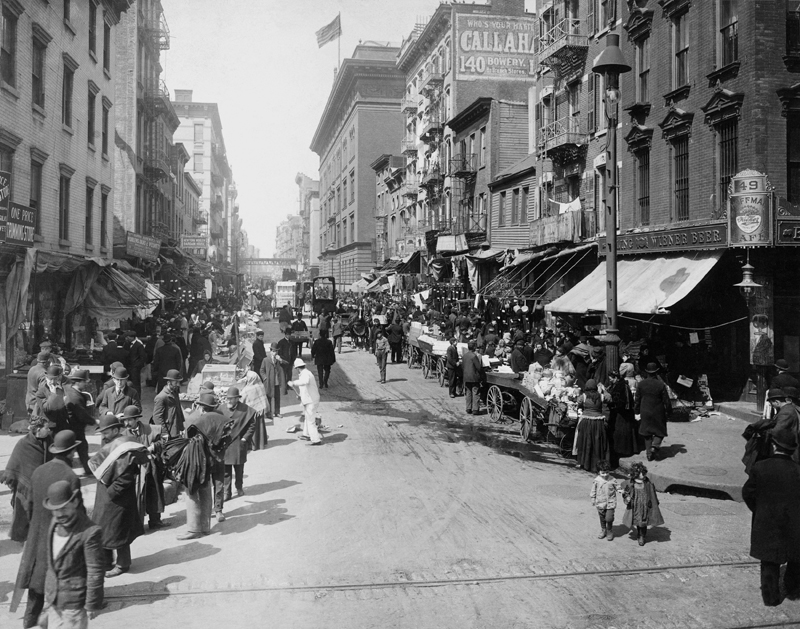
The Lower East Side in 1910

From Tyumen, the family returned to Tolochin, and from there, they travelled to Antwerp and left the old continent aboard the SS Rhynland from the Red Star Line. On September 14, 1893, the family arrived at Ellis Island in New York City. When they arrived, Israel was put in a pen with his brother and five sisters until immigration officials declared them fit to be allowed into the city. After the family's naturalization, the name "Beilin" was changed to "Baline".

The Berlins were one of hundreds of thousands of Jewish families who emigrated to the United States in the late 19th and early 20th century, escaping discrimination, poverty and brutal pogroms. Other such families included those of George and Ira Gershwin, Al Jolson, Sophie Tucker, L. Wolfe Gilbert, Jack Yellen, Louis B. Mayer (of MGM), and the Warner brothers.

After their arrival in New York City, the Baline family lived briefly in a basement flat on Monroe Street, and then moved to a three-room tenement at 330 Cherry Street. His father, unable to find comparable work as a cantor in New York, took a job at a kosher meat market and gave Hebrew lessons on the side to support his family. He died a few years later when Berlin was thirteen years old.

With only a few years of schooling, eight-year-old Berlin began helping to support his family. He became a newspaper boy, hawking The Evening Journal. One day while delivering newspapers, according to Berlin's biographer and friend, Alexander Woollcott, he stopped to look at a ship departing for China and became so entranced that he did not see a swinging crane, which knocked him into the river. When he was fished out after going down for the third time, he was still holding in his clenched fist the five pennies he earned that day.

His mother took a job as a midwife, and three of his sisters worked wrapping cigars, common for immigrant girls. His older brother worked in a sweatshop assembling shirts. Each evening, when the family came home from their day's work, Bergreen writes, "they would deposit the coins they had earned that day into Lena's outspread apron."

Music historian Philip Furia writes that when "Izzy" began to sell newspapers in the Bowery, he was exposed to the music and sounds coming from saloons and restaurants that lined the crowded streets. Young Berlin sang some of the songs he heard while selling papers, and people would toss him some coins. He confessed to his mother one evening that his newest ambition in life was to become a singing waiter in a saloon. From this he stepped up to work as a song plugger and singing waiter in cafes and restaurants in the downtown areas of New York City. His first lyric, written with a café pianist, earned him a royalty of thirty-seven cents.

However, before Berlin was fourteen his meager income was still adding less than his sisters' to the family's budget, which made him feel worthless. He then decided to leave home and join the city's ragged army of other young immigrants. He lived in the Bowery, taking up residence in one of the lodging houses that sheltered the thousands of other homeless boys on the Lower East Side. Bergreen describes them as being uncharitable living quarters, "Dickensian in their meanness, filth, and insensitivity to ordinary human beings."

=== Early jobs ===
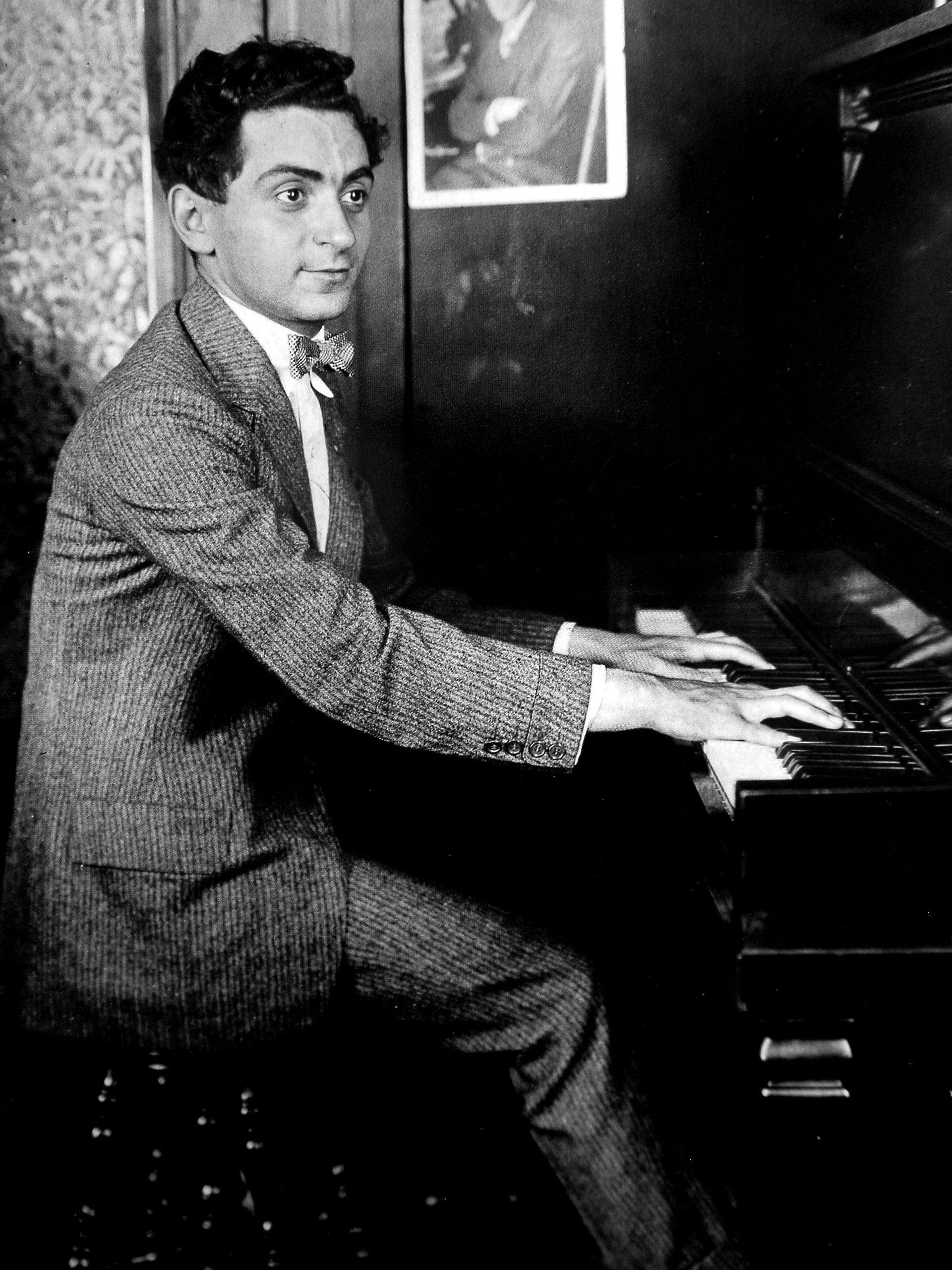
Berlin at his first job with a music publisher, aged 18

Having left school around the age of thirteen, Berlin had few survival skills and realized that formal employment was out of the question. His only ability was acquired from his father's vocation as a singer, and he joined with several other youngsters who went to saloons on the Bowery and sang to customers. Itinerant young singers like them were common on the Lower East Side. Berlin would sing a few of the popular ballads he heard on the street, hoping people would pitch him a few pennies. From these seamy surroundings, he became streetwise, with real and lasting education. Music was his only source of income, and he picked up the language and culture of the ghetto lifestyle.

Berlin learned what kind of songs appealed to audiences, writes Bergreen: "well-known tunes expressing simple sentiments were the most reliable." He soon began plugging songs at Tony Pastor's Music Hall in Union Square and, in 1906, when he was 18, got a job as a singing waiter at the Pelham Cafe in Chinatown. Besides serving drinks, he sang made-up "blue" parodies of hit songs to the delight of customers.

Biographer Charles Hamm writes that in Berlin's free time after hours, he taught himself to play the piano. Never having had lessons, after the bar closed for the night, young Berlin would sit at a piano in the back and begin improvising tunes. He published his first song, "Marie from Sunny Italy", written in collaboration with the Pelham's resident pianist Mike Nicholson, in 1907, receiving 33 cents for the publishing rights. The sheet music to the published song presented his name as "I. Berlin".

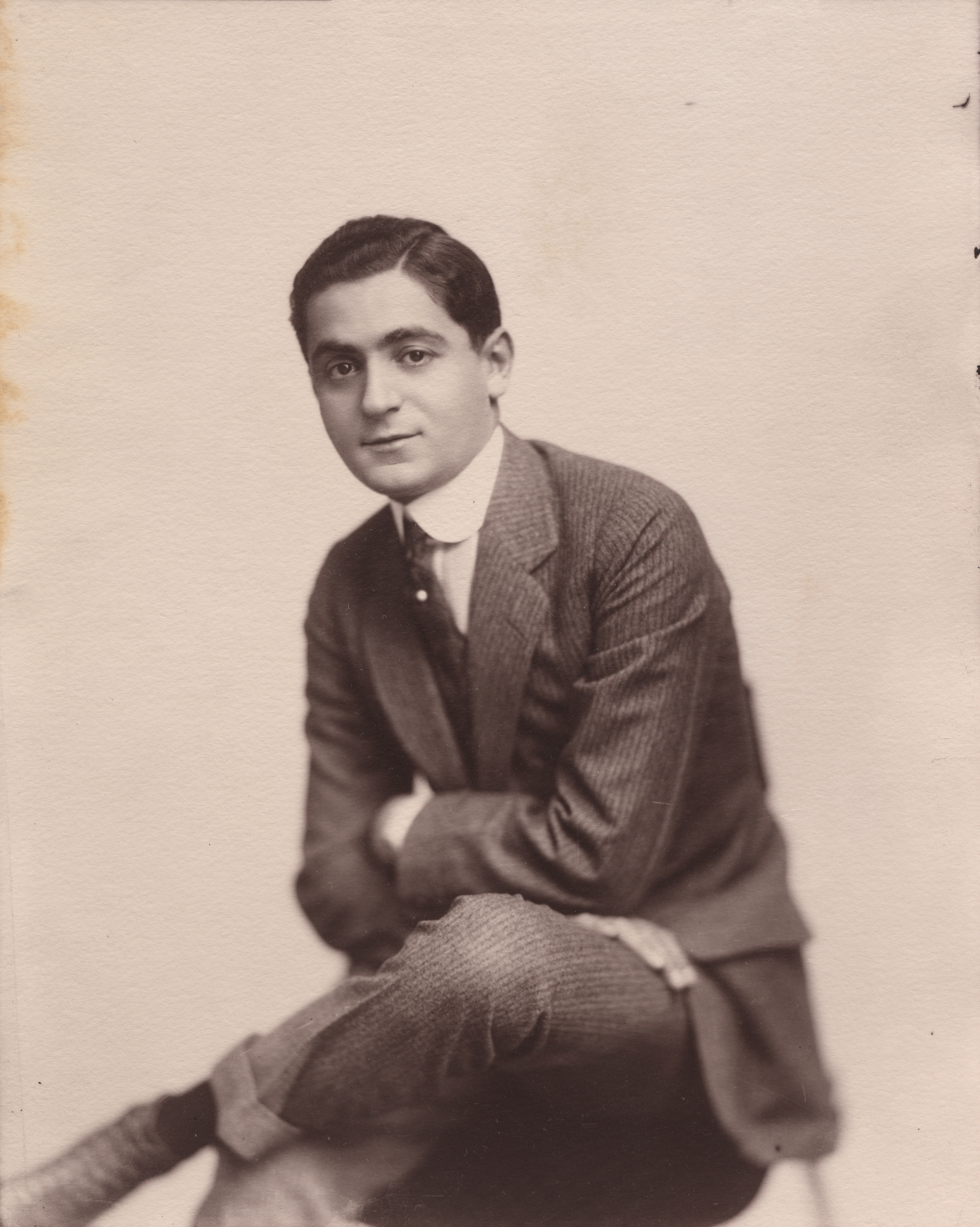
Berlin photographed in 1907 in Pach Brothers Studio

Berlin continued writing and playing music at Pelham Cafe and developing an early style. He liked the words to other people's songs but sometimes the rhythms were "kind of boggy", and he might change them. One night he delivered some hits composed by his friend George M. Cohan, another kid who was getting known on Broadway with his own songs. When Berlin ended with Cohan's "Yankee Doodle Boy", notes Whitcomb, "everybody in the joint applauded the feisty little fellow."

=== Recognition as songwriter ===
Max Winslow (c. 1883–1942), a staff member at music publisher Harry Von Tilzer Company, noticed Berlin's singing on many occasions and became so taken with his talent that he tried to get him a job with his firm. Von Tilzer said that Max claimed to have "discovered a great kid", and raved about him so much that Von Tilzer hired Berlin.

In 1908, when he was 20, Berlin took a new job at a saloon named Jimmy Kelly's in the Union Square neighborhood. There, he was able to collaborate with other young songwriters, such as Edgar Leslie, Ted Snyder, Al Piantadosi, and George A. Whiting. In 1909, the year of the premiere of Israel Zangwill's The Melting Pot, he got another big break as a staff lyricist with the Ted Snyder Company.

Installed as a staff lyricist with a leading Tin Pan Alley music publishing house, Berlin quickly established himself as one of that frantic industry's top writers of words to other composer's melodies. By 1910 he was already in demand and even appeared in a Shubert Broadway revue performing his own songs. It was purely by chance that Berlin started composing music to the words of his songs. A lyric he had submitted to a publisher was thought to be complete with music. Not wishing to lose the sale, Berlin quickly wrote a melody. It was accepted and published. The success of this first effort opened the door to his career as a composer of music as well as lyrics. In 1910, Berlin wrote a hit that solidly established him as one of Tin Pan Alley's leading composers. Alexander's Ragtime Band not only popularized the vogue for "ragtime", but later inspired a major motion picture.

== Songwriting career ==
=== Before 1920 ===
"Alexander's Ragtime Band", performed by Billy Murray, Edison Amberol cylinder, 1911

==== "Alexander's Ragtime Band" (1911) ====
Ragtime a Form of Insanity

'Alexander's Ragtime Band' is a public menace....Hysteria is the form of insanity that an abnormal love for ragtime seems to produce. It is as much a mental disease as acute mania—it has the same symptoms. When there is nothing done to check this form it produces idiocy.

— Dr. Ludwig Gruener
German newspaper story

Berlin rose as a songwriter in Tin Pan Alley and on Broadway. In 1911, Emma Carus introduced his first world-famous hit, "Alexander's Ragtime Band", followed by a performance from Berlin himself at the Friars' Frolic of 1911 with Clifford Hess as his accompanist. He became an instant celebrity, and the featured performer later that year at Oscar Hammerstein's vaudeville house, where he introduced dozens of other songs. The New York Telegraph described how two hundred of his street friends came to see "their boy" onstage: "All the little writer could do was to finger the buttons on his coat while tears ran down his cheeks—in a vaudeville house!"

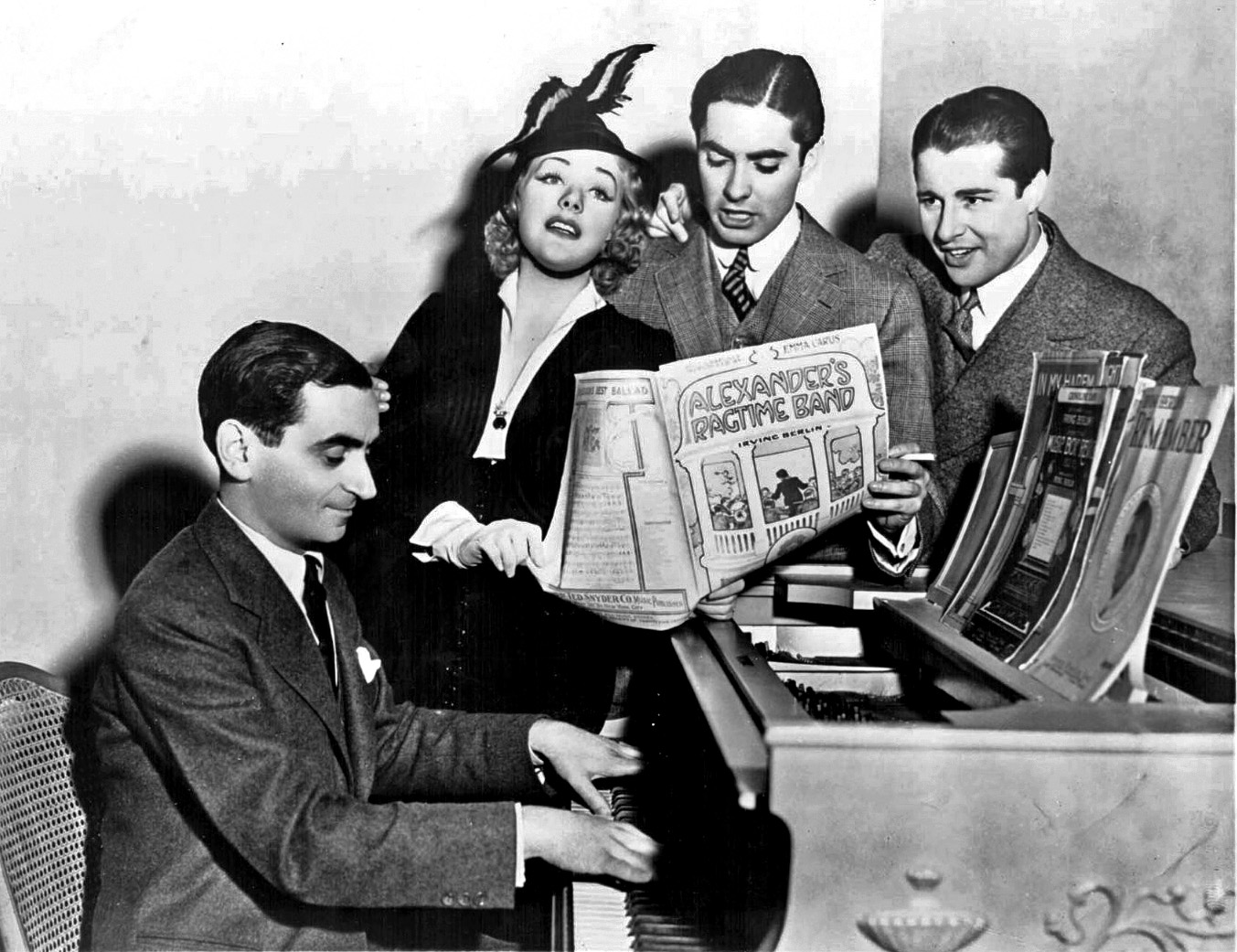
Berlin with film stars Alice Faye, Tyrone Power and Don Ameche singing chorus from Alexander's Ragtime Band (1938)

Richard Corliss, in a Time profile of Berlin, described "Alexander's Ragtime Band" as a march, not a rag, "its savviest musicality comprised quotes from a bugle call and "Swanee River". The tune revived the ragtime fervor that Scott Joplin had begun a decade earlier, and made Berlin a songwriting star. From its first and subsequent releases, the song was near the top of the charts as others sang it: Bessie Smith, in 1927, and Louis Armstrong, in 1937; No. 1 by Bing Crosby and Connee Boswell; Johnny Mercer in 1945; Al Jolson, in 1947 and Nellie Lutcher in 1948. Add Ray Charles's big-band version in 1959, and "Alexander" had a dozen hit versions in just under a half century.

Initially the song was not recognized as a hit, however; Broadway producer Jesse Lasky was uncertain about using it, although he did include it in his "Follies" show. It was performed as an instrumental but did not impress audiences, and was soon dropped from the show's score. Berlin regarded it as a failure. He then wrote lyrics to the score, played it again in another Broadway review, and this time Variety news weekly called it "the musical sensation of the decade". Composer George Gershwin, foreseeing its influence, said it was "the first real American musical work", adding, "Berlin had shown us the way; it was now easier to attain our ideal."

==== Sparking an international dance craze ====
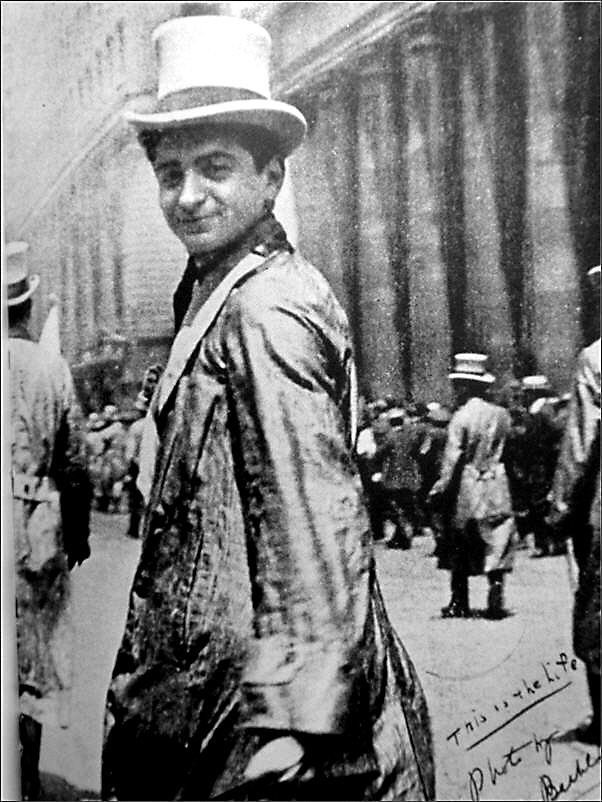
Enjoying early success in New York, c. 1911

Berlin was "flabbergasted" by the sudden international popularity of the song, and wondered why it became a sudden hit. He decided it was partly because the lyrics, "silly though it was, was fundamentally right ... [and] the melody ... started the heels and shoulders of all America and a good section of Europe to rocking." In 1913, Berlin was featured in the London revue Hello Ragtime, where he introduced "That International Rag", a song he had written for the occasion.

Watch Your Step

Furia writes that the international success of "Alexander's Ragtime Band" gave ragtime "new life and sparked a national dance craze". Two dancers who expressed that craze were Vernon and Irene Castle. In 1914, Berlin wrote a ragtime revue, Watch Your Step, which starred the couple and showcased their talents on stage. That musical revue became Berlin's first complete score with songs that "radiated musical and lyrical sophistication". Berlin's songs signified modernism, and they signified the cultural struggle between Victorian gentility and the "purveyors of liberation, indulgence, and leisure", says Furia. The song "Play a Simple Melody" became the first of his famous "double" songs in which two different melodies and lyrics are counterpointed against one another.

Variety called Watch Your Step the "first syncopated musical", where the "sets and the girls were gorgeous". Berlin was then 26, and the success of the show was riding on his name alone. Variety said the show was a "terrific hit" from its opening night. It compared Berlin's newfound status as a composer with that of the Times building: "That youthful marvel of syncopated melody is proving things in Watch Your Step, firstly that he is not alone a rag composer, and that he is one of the greatest lyric writers America has ever produced."

Whitcomb also points out the irony that Russia, the country Berlin's family was forced to leave, flung itself into "the ragtime beat with an abandon bordering on mania". For example, Prince Felix Yusupov, a recent Oxford undergraduate of Russian noble lineage and heir to the largest estate in Russia, was described by his dance partner as "wriggling around the ballroom like a demented worm, screaming for 'more ragtime and more champagne'".

==== Simple and romantic ballads ====
My ambition is to reach the heart of the average American, not the highbrow nor the lowbrow but that vast intermediate crew which is the real soul of the country. The highbrow is likely to be superficial, overtrained, supersensitive. The lowbrow is warped, subnormal. My public is the real people.

— Irving Berlin

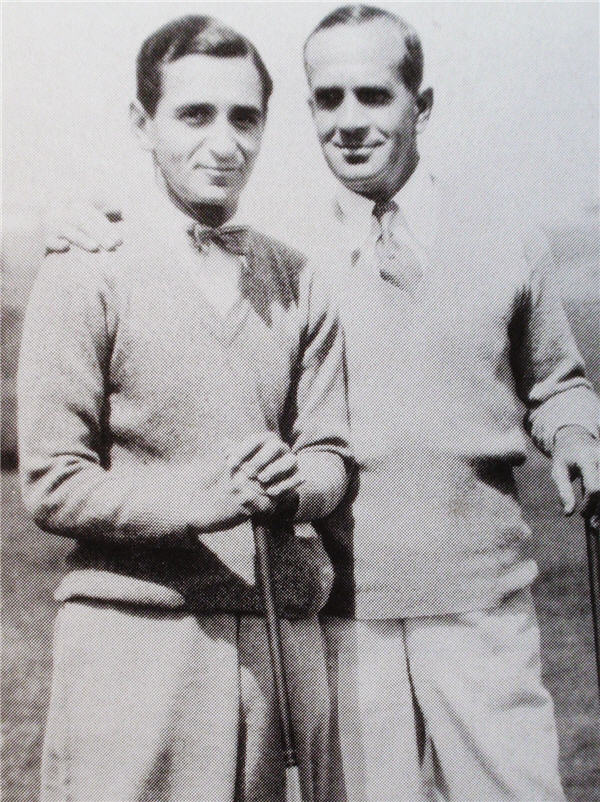
With Al Jolson (r), star of The Jazz Singer, c. 1927

Some of the songs Berlin created came out of his own sadness. For instance, in 1912 he married Dorothy Goetz, the sister of songwriter E. Ray Goetz. She died six months later of typhoid fever contracted during their honeymoon in Havana. The song he wrote to express his grief, "When I Lost You", was his first ballad. It was an immediate popular hit and sold more than a million copies.

He began to realize that ragtime was not a good musical style for serious romantic expression, and over the next few years adapted his style by writing more love songs. In 1915 he wrote the hit "I Love a Piano", a comical and erotic ragtime love song.

By 1918 he had written hundreds of songs, mostly topical, which enjoyed brief popularity. Many of the songs were for the new dances then appearing, such as the grizzly bear, chicken walk, or foxtrot. After a Hawaiian dance craze began, he wrote "That Hula-Hula", and then did a string of Southern songs, such as "When the Midnight Choo-Choo Leaves for Alabam". During this period, he was creating a few new songs every week, including songs aimed at the various immigrant cultures arriving from Europe. On one occasion, Berlin, whose face was still not known, was on a train trip and decided to entertain the fellow passengers with some music. They asked him how he knew so many hit songs, and Berlin modestly replied, "I wrote them."

An important song that Berlin wrote during his transition from writing ragtime to lyrical ballads was "A Pretty Girl is Like a Melody", which became one of Berlin's "first big guns", says historian Alec Wilder. The song was written for Ziegfeld's Follies of 1919 and became the musical's lead song. Its popularity was so great that it later became the theme for all of Ziegfeld's revues, and the theme song in the 1936 film The Great Ziegfeld. Wilder puts it on the same level as Jerome Kern's "pure melodies", and in comparison with Berlin's earlier music, says it is "extraordinary that such a development in style and sophistication should have taken place in a single year".

==== World War I ====
On April 1, 1917, after President Woodrow Wilson declared that America would enter World War I, Berlin felt that Tin Pan Alley should do its duty and support the war with inspirational songs. Berlin wrote the song "For Your Country and My Country", stating that "we must speak with the sword not the pen to show our appreciation to America for opening up her heart and welcoming every immigrant group." He also co-wrote a song aimed at ending ethnic conflict, "Let's All Be Americans Now".

===== Yip Yip Yaphank =====
At the grand finale... Sergeant Berlin led the entire 300-person cast off the stage, marching them down the theater's aisles, singing 'We're on Our Way to France,' all to tumultuous applause. The cast carried off their little producer like he was victor ludorum ... Tin Pan Alley had joined hands with real life

— biographer Ian Whitcomb.

In 1917, Berlin was drafted into the United States Army, and his induction became headline news, with one paper headline reading, "Army Takes Berlin!" But the Army wanted Berlin, now aged 30, to do what he knew best: write songs. While stationed with the 152nd Depot Brigade at Camp Upton, he then composed an all-soldier musical revue titled Yip Yip Yaphank, written as a patriotic tribute to the United States Army. The show was taken to Broadway where it also included a number of hits, including "Mandy" and "Oh! How I Hate to Get Up in the Morning", which Berlin performed himself.

The shows earned $150,000 for a camp service center. One song he wrote for the show but decided not to use, he would introduce 20 years later: "God Bless America".

=== 1920 to 1940 ===
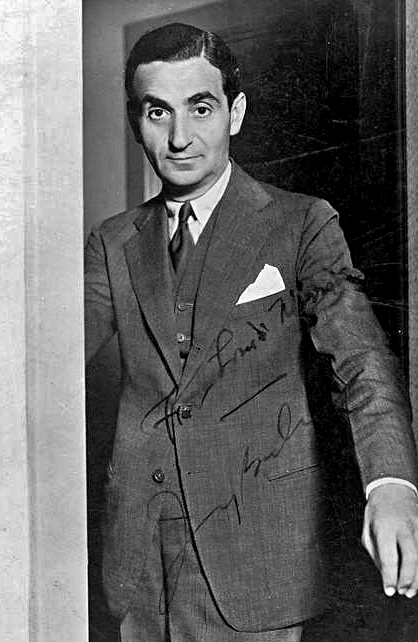
c. 1920

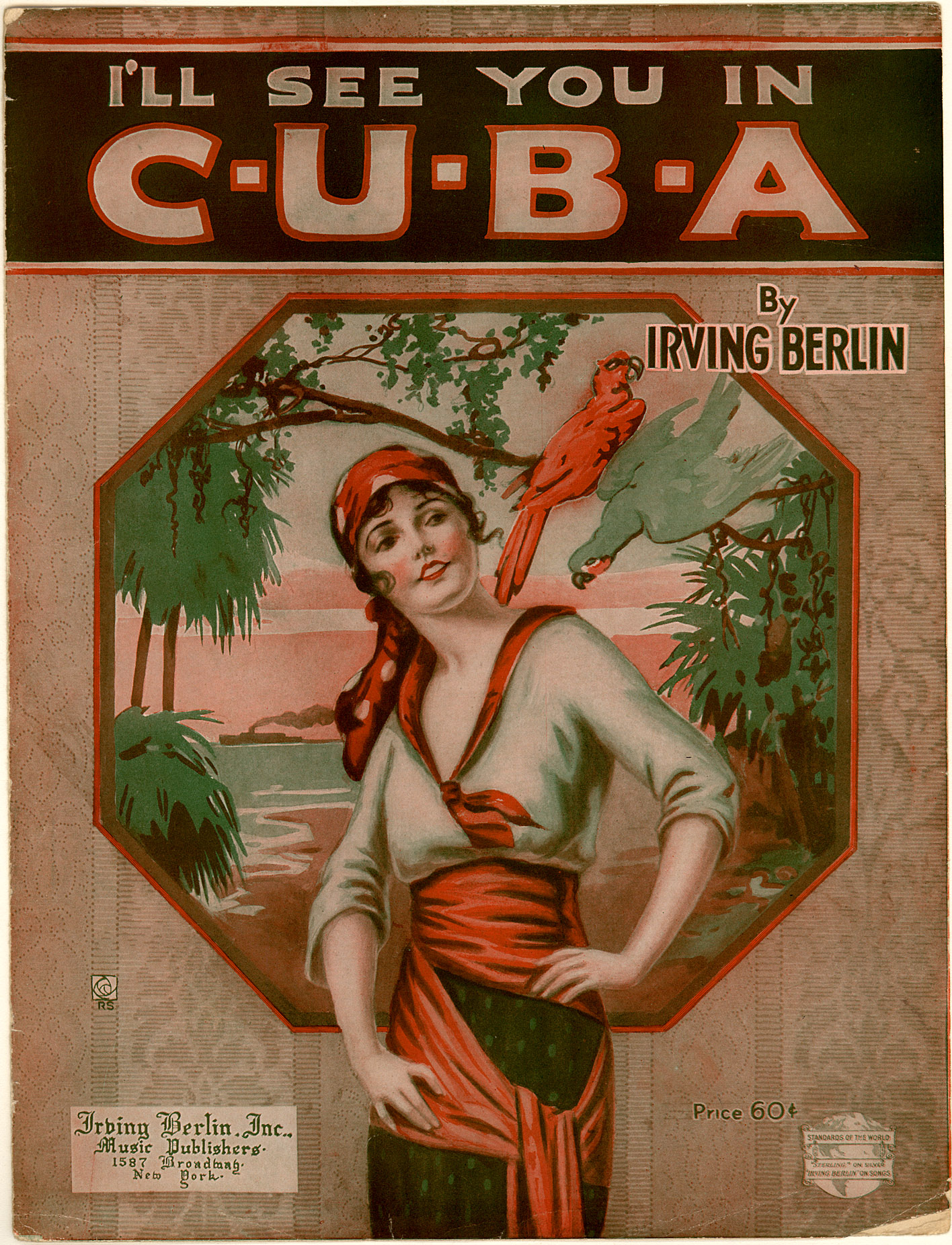
I'll See You in C-U-B-A, cover of 1920 sheet music

Berlin returned to Tin Pan Alley after the war and in 1921 created a partnership with Sam Harris to build the Music Box Theater. He maintained an interest in the theater throughout his life, and even in his last years was known to call the Shubert Organization, his partner, to check on the receipts. In its early years, the theater was a showcase for revues by Berlin. As theater owner, producer and composer, he looked after every detail of his shows, from the costumes and sets to the casting and musical arrangements.

According to Berlin biographer David Leopold, the theater, located at 239 West 45th St., was the only Broadway house built to accommodate the works of a songwriter. It was the home of Berlin's Music Box Revue from 1921 to 1925 and As Thousands Cheer in 1933 and today includes an exhibition devoted to Berlin in the lobby.

==== Various hit songs by Berlin ====
By 1926, Berlin had written the scores to two editions of the Ziegfeld Follies and four annual editions of his Music Box Revue. These shows spanned the years of 1921–1926, premiering songs such as "Say It With Music", "Everybody Step", and "Pack Up Your Things and Go to the Devil". Life magazine called Berlin the "Lullaby Kid", noting that "couples at country-club dances grew misty-eyed when the band went into 'Always', because they were positive that Berlin had written it just for them. When they quarreled and parted in the bitter-sweetness of the 1920s, it was Berlin who gave eloquence to their heartbreak by way of 'What'll I Do' and 'Remember' and 'All Alone'".

"What'll I Do?" (1924)

This ballad of love and longing was a hit record for Paul Whiteman and had several other successful recordings in 1924. Twenty-four years later, the song went to no. 22 for Nat King Cole and no. 23 for Frank Sinatra.

"Always" (1925)

Written when he fell in love with Ellin Mackay, who later became his wife. The song became a hit twice (for Vincent Lopez and George Olsen) in its first incarnation. There were four more hit versions in 1944–45. In 1959, Sammy Turner took the song to no. 2 on the R&B chart. It became Patsy Cline's postmortem anthem and hit no. 18 on the country chart in 1980, 17 years after her death, and a tribute musical called "Always... Patsy Cline", played a two-year Nashville run that ended in 1995. Leonard Cohen included a cover of this song on his 1992 release The Future.

"Blue Skies" (1926)

Written after his first daughter's birth, he distilled his feelings about being married and a father for the first time: "Blue days, all of them gone; nothing but blue skies, from now on." The American public often associated Irving Berlin's music with Jewish cultural sensibility, when Berlin composed "Blue Skies", the question of how a piece that resonated strongly with Jewish culture, became a strong representation of American musical culture came into light. Studying the early performances and its sheet music can help us understand how Jewish culture helped influence the pieces’ composition and popular reaction. Later interpretations transformed the songs’ ethnic and cultural connections. The song was introduced by Belle Baker in Betsy, a Ziegfeld production. It became a hit recording for Ben Selvin and one of several Berlin hits in 1927. It was performed by Al Jolson in the first feature sound film, The Jazz Singer, that same year. In 1946, it returned to the top 10 on the charts with Count Basie and Benny Goodman. In 1978, Willie Nelson made the song a no. 1 country hit, 52 years after it was written.

"Puttin' On the Ritz" (1928)

An instant standard with one of Berlin's most "intricately syncopated choruses", this song is associated with Fred Astaire, who sang and danced to it in the 1946 film Blue Skies. The song was written in 1928 with a separate set of lyrics and was introduced by Harry Richman in a 1930 film of the same name. In 1939, Clark Gable sang it in the movie Idiot's Delight. In 1974 it was featured in the movie Young Frankenstein by Mel Brooks, and was a no. 4 hit for synth-pop artist Taco in 1982, when its composer was 95. In 2012 it was used for a flash mob wedding event in Moscow.

"Marie" (1929)

This waltz-time song was a hit for Rudy Vallée in 1929, and in 1937, updated to a four-quarter-time swing arrangement, was a top hit for Tommy Dorsey. It was on the charts at no. 13 in 1953 for The Four Tunes and at no. 15 for the Bachelors in 1965, 36 years after its first appearance.

"Say It Isn't So" (1932)

Rudy Vallée performed it on his radio show, and the song was a hit for George Olsen, Connee Boswell (she was still known as Connie), and Ozzie Nelson's band. Aretha Franklin produced a single of the song in 1963, 31 years later. Furia notes that when Vallée first introduced the song on his radio show, the "song not only became an overnight hit, it saved Vallée's marriage: The Vallées had planned to get a divorce, but after Vallée sang Berlin's romantic lyrics on the air, "both he and his wife dissolved in tears" and decided to stay together.

"I've Got My Love to Keep Me Warm" (1937)

Performed by Dick Powell in the 1937 film On the Avenue. Later it had four top-12 versions, including by Billie Holiday and Les Brown, who took it to no. 1.

==== "God Bless America" (1938) ====
The song's introduction at that time enshrines a strain of official patriotism intertwined with a religious faith that runs deep in the American psyche. Patriotic razzle-dazzle, sophisticated melancholy and humble sentiments: Berlin songs span the emotional terrain of America with a thoroughness that others may have equaled but none have surpassed.

— The New York Times

The song was written by Berlin twenty years earlier, but he filed it away until 1938 when Kate Smith needed a patriotic song to mark the 20th anniversary of Armistice Day, celebrating the end of World War I. Its release near the end of the Depression, which had by then gone on for nine years, enshrined a "strain of official patriotism intertwined with a religious faith that runs deep in the American psyche," stated The New York Times.

Berlin's daughter, Mary Ellin Barrett, states that the song was actually "very personal" for her father, and was intended as an expression of his deep gratitude to the nation for merely "allowing" him, an immigrant raised in poverty, to become a successful songwriter. "To me," said Berlin, "'God Bless America' was not just a song but an expression of my feeling toward the country to which I owe what I have and what I am." The Economist magazine writes that "Berlin was producing a deep-felt paean to the country that had given him what he would have said was everything."

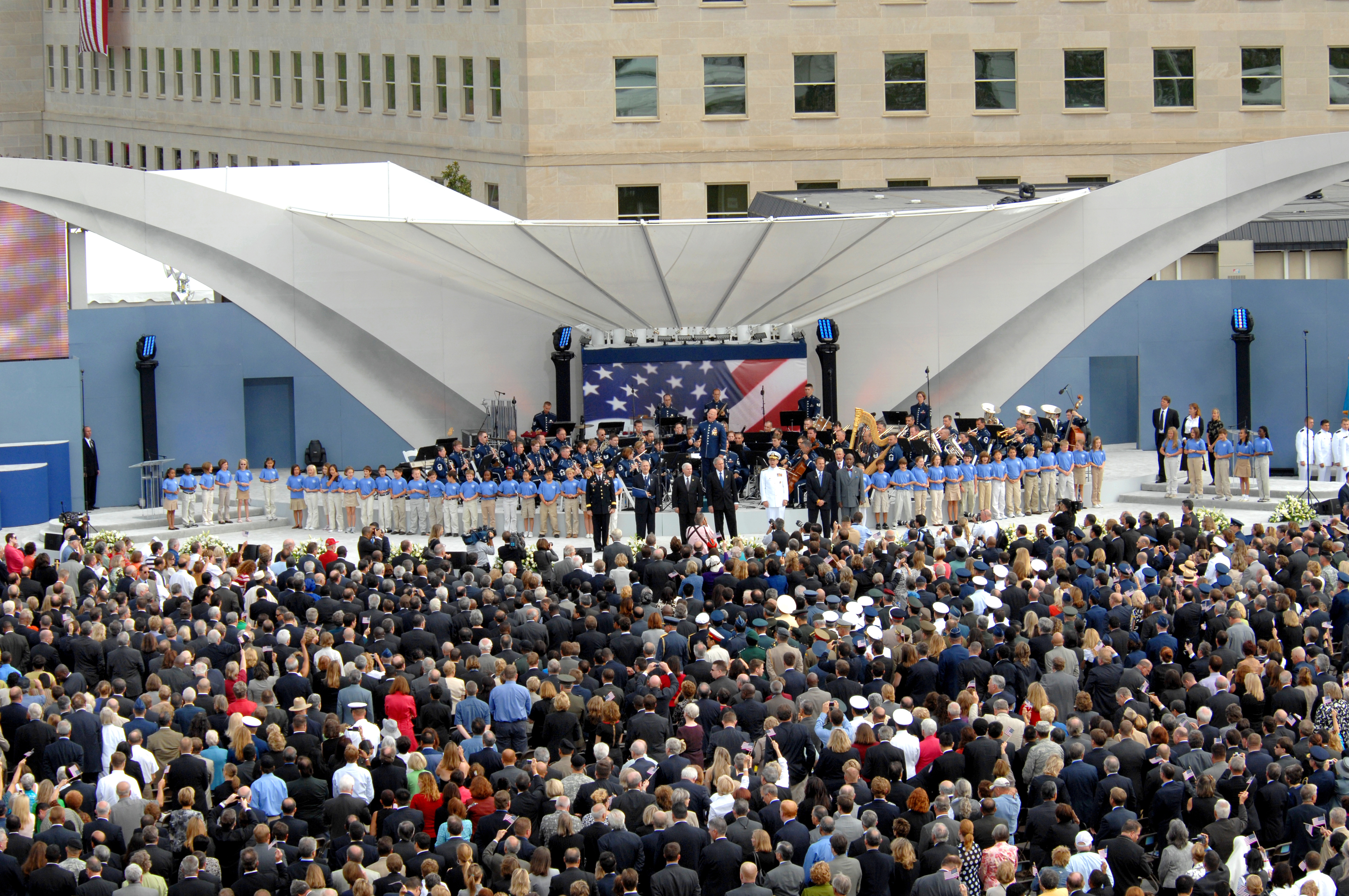
Singing of "God Bless America" at the Pentagon Memorial dedication (September 11, 2008)

It quickly became a second national anthem after America entered World War II a few years later. Over the decades it has earned millions for the Boy Scouts and Girl Scouts, to whom Berlin assigned all royalties. In 1954, Berlin received a special Congressional Gold Medal from President Dwight D. Eisenhower for contributing the song.

The song was heard after September 11, 2001, as U.S. senators and congressmen stood on the Capitol steps and sang it after the terrorist attacks on the World Trade Center. It is often played by sports teams such as major league baseball. The Philadelphia Flyers hockey team started playing it before crucial contests. When the 1980 U.S. Olympic hockey team pulled off the "greatest upset in sports history", referred to as the "Miracle on Ice", the players spontaneously sang it as Americans were overcome by patriotism.

==== Other songs ====
Though most of his works for the Broadway stage took the form of revues—collections of songs with no unifying plot—he did write a number of book shows. The Cocoanuts (1929) was a light comedy with a cast featuring, among others, the Marx Brothers. Face the Music (1932) was a political satire with a book by Moss Hart, and Louisiana Purchase (1940) was a satire of a Southern politician obviously based on the exploits of Huey Long. As Thousands Cheer (1933) was a revue, also with book by Moss Hart, with a theme: each number was presented as an item in a newspaper, some of them touching on issues of the day. The show yielded a succession of hit songs, including "Easter Parade" sung by Marilyn Miller and Clifton Webb, "Heat Wave" (presented as the weather forecast), "Harlem on My Mind", and "Supper Time", a song about racial violence inspired by a newspaper headline about a lynching, sung by Ethel Waters. She once said about the song, "If one song can tell the whole tragic history of a race, 'Supper Time' was that song. In singing it I was telling my comfortable, well-fed, well-dressed listeners about my people...those who had been slaves and those who were now downtrodden and oppressed."

=== 1941 to 1962 ===
==== World War II patriotism—"This is the Army" (1943) ====
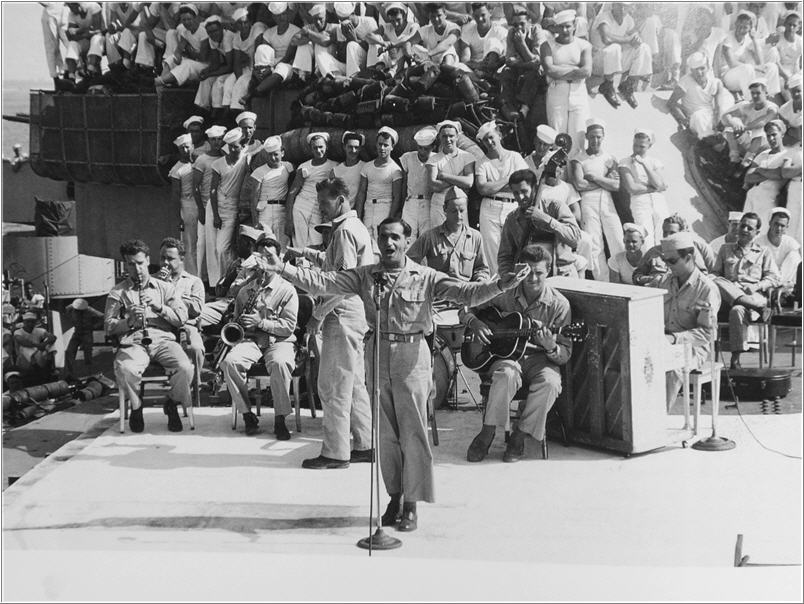
Irving Berlin singing and conducting aboard USS Arkansas, 1944

Berlin loved his country, and wrote many songs reflecting his patriotism. Treasury Secretary Henry Morgenthau requested a song to inspire Americans to buy war bonds, for which he wrote "Any Bonds Today?" He assigned all royalties to the United States Treasury Department. He then wrote songs for various government agencies and likewise assigned all profits to them: "Angels of Mercy" for the American Red Cross; "Arms for the Love of America", for the U.S. Army Ordnance Department; and "I Paid My Income Tax Today", again to Treasury.

When the United States joined World War II after the attack on Pearl Harbor in December 1941, Berlin immediately began composing a number of patriotic songs. His most notable and valuable contribution to the war effort was a stage show he wrote called "This Is The Army". It was taken to Broadway and then on to Washington, D.C. (where President Franklin D. Roosevelt attended). It was eventually shown at military bases throughout the world, including London, North Africa, Italy, Middle East, and Pacific countries, sometimes in close proximity to battle zones. Berlin wrote nearly three dozen songs for the show which contained a cast of 300 men. He supervised the production and traveled with it, always singing "Oh! How I Hate to Get Up in the Morning". The show kept him away from his family for three and a half years, during which time he took neither salary nor expenses, and turned over all profits to the Army Emergency Relief Fund.

The play was adapted into a movie of the same name in 1943, directed by Michael Curtiz, co-starring Joan Leslie and Ronald Reagan, who was then an army lieutenant. Kate Smith also sang "God Bless America" in the film with a backdrop showing families anxious over the coming war. The show became a hit movie and a morale-boosting road show that toured the battlefronts of Europe. The shows and movie combined raised more than $10 million for the Army, and in recognition of his contributions to troop morale, Berlin was awarded the Medal for Merit by President Harry S. Truman. Berlin's daughter, Mary Ellin Barrett, who was 15 when she was at the opening-night performance of "This is the Army" on Broadway, remembered that when her father, who normally shunned the spotlight, appeared in the second act in soldier's garb to sing "Oh, How I Hate to Get Up in the Morning", he was greeted with a standing ovation that lasted 10 minutes. She adds that he was in his mid-50s at the time, and later declared those years with the show were the "most thrilling time of his life".

==== Annie Get Your Gun (1946) ====
The grueling tours Berlin did performing "This Is The Army" left him exhausted, but when his longtime close friend Jerome Kern, who was the composer for Annie Get Your Gun, died suddenly, producers Richard Rodgers and Oscar Hammerstein II persuaded Berlin to take over composing the score.

What distinguishes Berlin is the brilliance of his lyrics. 'You Can't Get a Man With a Gun'—that's as good a comic song as has ever been written by anybody. You look at the jokes and how quickly they're told, and it still has a plot to it. It's sophisticated and very underrated.

— composer-lyricist Stephen Sondheim

Loosely based on the life of sharpshooter Annie Oakley, the music and lyrics were written by Berlin, with a book by Herbert Fields and his sister Dorothy Fields, and directed by Joshua Logan. At first Berlin refused to take on the job, claiming that he knew nothing about "hillbilly music", but the show ran for 1,147 performances and became his most successful score and biggest box office success. It is said that the showstopper song "There's No Business Like Show Business" was almost left out of the show altogether because Berlin mistakenly thought that Rodgers and Hammerstein didn't like it. However, it became the "ultimate uptempo show tune".

On the origin of another of the play's leading songs, Logan described how he and Hammerstein privately discussed wanting another duet between Annie and Frank. Berlin overheard their conversation, and although the show was to go into rehearsal within days, he wrote the song "Anything You Can Do" a few hours later.

One reviewer commented about the play's score, that "its tough wisecracking lyrics are as tersely all-knowing as its melody, which is nailed down in brassy syncopated lines that have been copied—but never equaled in sheer melodic memorability—by hundreds of theater composers ever since." Singer and musicologist Susannah McCorkle writes that the score "meant more to me than ever, now that I knew that he wrote it after a grueling world tour and years of separation from his wife and daughters." Historian and composer Alec Wilder says that the perfection of the score, when compared to his earlier works, was "a profound shock".

Apparently the "creative spurt" in which Berlin turned out several songs for the score in a single weekend was an anomaly. According to his daughter, he usually "sweated blood" to write his songs. Annie Get Your Gun is considered to be Berlin's best musical theatre score not only because of the number of hits it contains, but because its songs successfully combine character and plot development. The song "There's No Business Like Show Business" became "Ethel Merman's trademark".

==== Final shows ====
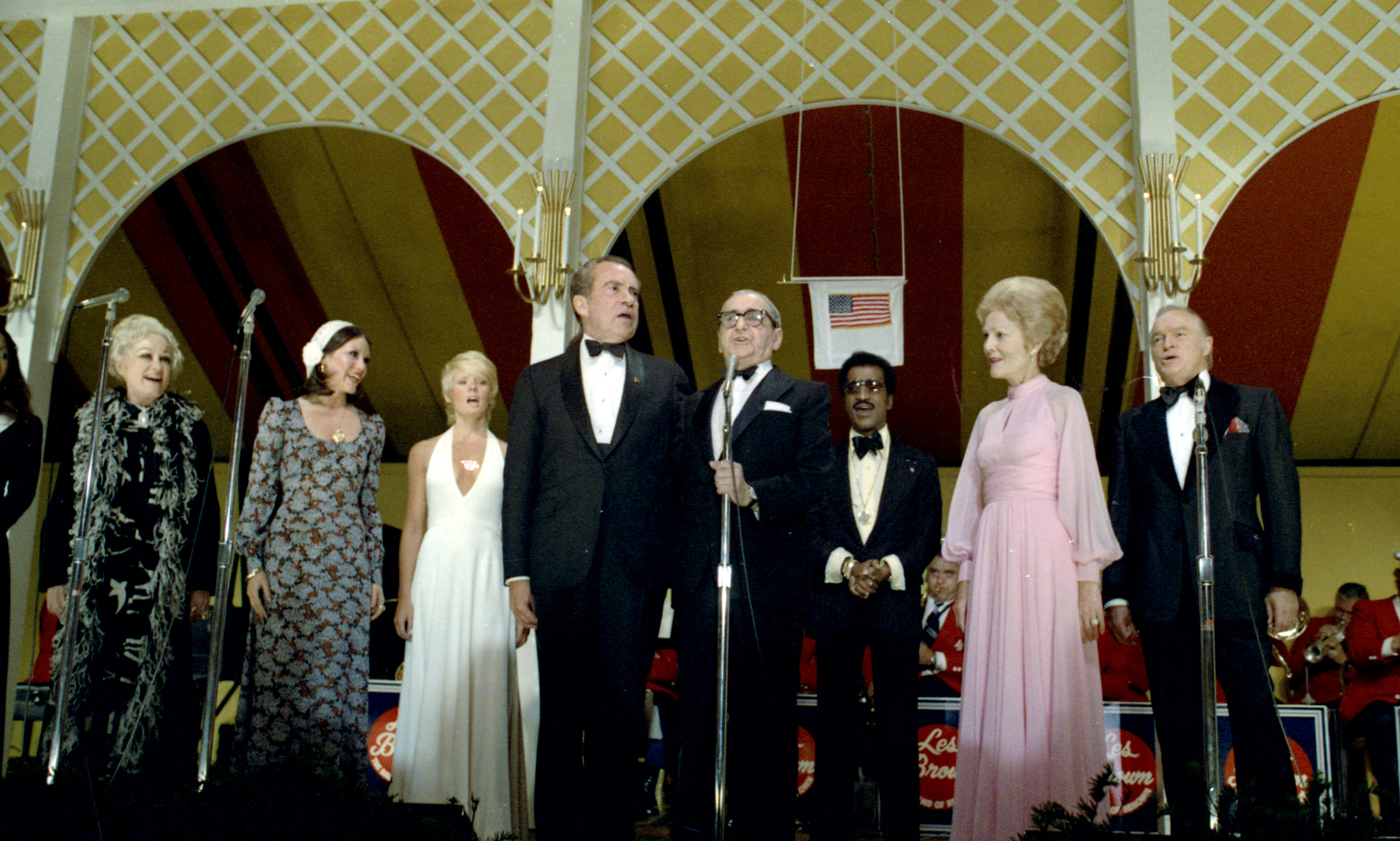
Berlin sings "God Bless America" with President Richard Nixon at the White House Vietnam POW Dinner (1973)

Berlin's next show, Miss Liberty (1949), was disappointing, but Call Me Madam (1950), starring Ethel Merman as Sally Adams, a Washington, D.C., socialite, loosely based on the famous Washington hostess Perle Mesta, fared better, giving him his second-greatest success. Berlin made two attempts to write a musical about his friend, the colorful Addison Mizner, and Addison's con-man brother Wilson. The first was the uncompleted The Last Resorts (1952); a manuscript of Act I is in the Library of Congress. Wise Guy (1956) was completed but never produced, although songs have been published and recorded on The Unsung Irving Berlin (1995). After a failed attempt at retirement, in 1962, at the age of 74, he returned to Broadway with Mr. President. Although it ran for eight months, (with the premiere attended by President John F. Kennedy), it was not one of his successful plays.

Afterwards, Berlin officially announced his retirement and spent his remaining years in New York. He did, however, write one new song, "An Old-Fashioned Wedding", for the 1966 Broadway revival of Annie Get Your Gun starring Ethel Merman. Though he lived 23 more years, this was one of Berlin's final published compositions.

Berlin maintained a low profile through the last decades of his life, almost never appearing in public after the late 1960s, even for events held in his honor. However, he continued to maintain control of his songs through his own music publishing company, which remained in operation for the rest of his life.

== Film scores ==
=== 1920s–1950s ===
In 1927, his song "Blue Skies" was featured in the first feature-length talkie, The Jazz Singer, with Al Jolson. Later, movies such as Top Hat (1935) became the first of a series of distinctive film musicals by Berlin starring performers Bing Crosby, Fred Astaire, Judy Garland, Ginger Rogers, and Alice Faye. Top Hat featured a brand-new score, as did several more, including Follow the Fleet (1936), On the Avenue (1937), Carefree (1938), and Second Fiddle (1939). Starting with Alexander's Ragtime Band (1938), he often blended new songs with existing ones from his catalog. He continued this process with the films Holiday Inn (1942), Blue Skies (1946) and Easter Parade (1948), with Judy Garland and Fred Astaire, and There's No Business Like Show Business (1954).

==== "White Christmas" (1942) ====
The 1942 film Holiday Inn introduced "White Christmas", one of the most recorded songs in history. First sung in the film by Bing Crosby (along with Marjorie Reynolds, whose voice was dubbed by Martha Mears), it stayed no. 1 on the pop and R&B charts for 10 weeks, and went on to over 50 million records. Crosby's version is the best-selling single of all time. Music critic Stephen Holden credits this partly to the fact that "the song also evokes a primal nostalgia—a pure childlike longing for roots, home and childhood—that goes way beyond the greeting imagery."

Richard Corliss also notes that the song was even more significant having been released soon after America entered World War II: [it] "connected with... GIs in their first winter away from home. To them it voiced the ache of separation and the wistfulness they felt for the girl back home, for the innocence of youth...." Poet Carl Sandburg wrote, "We have learned to be a little sad and a little lonesome without being sickly about it. This feeling is caught in the song of a thousand jukeboxes and tune whistled in streets and homes, 'I'm Dreaming of a White Christmas'. When we sing that we don't hate anybody. And there are things we love that we're going to have sometimes if the breaks are not too bad against us. Way down under this latest hit of his, Irving Berlin catches us where we love peace."

"White Christmas" won Berlin the Academy Award for Best Music in an Original Song, one of seven Oscar nominations he received during his career. In subsequent years, it was re-recorded and became a top-10 seller for numerous artists: Frank Sinatra, Jo Stafford, Ernest Tubb, The Ravens and The Drifters. It would also be the last time a Berlin song went to no. 1 upon its release.

Berlin is the only Academy Award presenter and Academy Award winner to open the "envelope" and read his or her own name (for "White Christmas"). This result was so awkward for Berlin (since he had to present the Oscar to himself) that the academy changed the rules of protocol the following year to prevent this situation from arising again.

Talking about Irving Berlin's "White Christmas", composer–lyricist Garrison Hintz stated that although songwriting can be a complicated process, its final result should sound simple. Considering the fact that "White Christmas" has only eight sentences in the entire song, lyrically Mr. Berlin achieved all that was necessary to eventually sell over 100 million copies and capture the hearts of the American public at the same time.

== Songwriting methods ==
According to Saul Bornstein (a.k.a. Sol Bourne, Saul Bourne), Berlin's publishing company manager, "It was a ritual for Berlin to write a complete song, words and music, every day." Berlin said that he "did not believe in inspiration," and felt that although he might be gifted in certain areas, his most successful compositions were a "result of work". He said that he did most of his work under pressure. He would typically begin writing after dinner and continue until 4 or 5 in the morning. "Each day I would attend rehearsals", he said, "and at night write another song and bring it down the next day."

Not always certain about his own writing abilities, he once asked a songwriter friend, Victor Herbert, whether he should study composition. "You have a natural gift for words and music," Mr. Herbert told him. "Learning theory might help you a little, but it could cramp your style." Berlin took his advice. Herbert later became a moving force behind the creation of ASCAP, the American Society of Composers, Authors and Publishers. In 1914, Berlin joined him as a charter member of the organization that has protected the royalties of composers and writers ever since. In 1920, Irving Berlin became a member of SACEM, the French Society of Authors, Composers, and Publishers.

In later years, Berlin emphasized his conviction, saying that "it's the lyrics that makes a song a hit, although the tune, of course, is what makes it last." He played almost entirely in the key of F-sharp so that he could stay on the black keys, and owned three transposing pianos so as to change keys by moving a lever. Though Berlin eventually learned how to produce written music, he never changed his method of dictating songs to a "musical secretary". (Note: Berlin never learned to play in more than one key and used two special pianos (his first piano, purchased second-hand in 1909, was made by Weser Brothers, augmented in 1921 by a second from Somner Brothers) with transposing levers to change keys. Berlin demonstrated his transposing keyboard during a television show with Dinah Shore, and the piano was placed on display in Belgium's Red Star Line Museum in 2013, on loan from the Emmet family. A second transposing piano is on loan from the Peters family to the National Museum of American Jewish History in Philadelphia.)

As a result, Wilder says that many admirers of the music of Jerome Kern, Richard Rodgers and Cole Porter were unlikely to consider Berlin's work in the same category because they forgot or never realized that Berlin wrote many popular tunes, such as "Soft Lights and Sweet Music", "Supper Time", and "Cheek to Cheek". Some are even more confused because he also wrote more romantic melodies, such as "What'll I Do?" and "Always". Wilder adds that "in his lyrics as in his melodies, Berlin reveals a constant awareness of the world around him: the pulse of the times, the society in which his is functioning. There is nothing of the hothouse about his work, urban though it may be."

== Music styles ==
His music has that vitality—both rhythmic and melodic—which never seems to lose any of its exuberant freshness; it has that rich, colorful melodic flow which is ever the wonder of all those of who, too, compose songs; his ideas are endless.

— composer George Gershwin

Composer Jerome Kern recognized that the essence of Irving Berlin's lyrics was his "faith in the American vernacular", an influence so profound that his best-known songs "seem indivisible from the country's history and self-image". Kern, along with George Gershwin, Richard Rodgers, Oscar Hammerstein II and Cole Porter, brought together Afro-American, Latin American, rural pop, and European operetta.

Berlin, however, did not follow that method. Instead, says music critic Stephen Holden, Berlin's songs were always simple, "exquisitely crafted street songs whose diction feels so natural that one scarcely notices the craft....they seem to flow straight out of the rhythms and inflections of everyday speech." Berlin can be credited with helping develop Jazz music. Jeffrey Magee wrote how his song "Everybody Step" was credited by composers such as Gershwin as one of the most important songs for learning jazz music. Berlin achieved this by using varying rhythms, such as the conventional rag and blues rhythms, as well as bringing in references to African American music. It led composer George Gershwin to claim that he learned from Berlin that ragtime, which later became jazz, "was the only musical idiom in existence that could aptly express America".

Among Berlin's contemporaries was Cole Porter, whose music style was often considered more "witty, sophisticated, [and] dirty", according to musicologist Susannah McCorkle. Of the five top songwriters, only Porter and Berlin wrote both their own words and music. However, she notes that Porter, unlike Berlin, was a Yale-educated and wealthy Midwesterner whose songs were not successful until he was in his thirties. She notes further that it was "Berlin [who] got Porter the show that launched his career."

== Personal life ==
=== Marriages ===
In February 1912, after a brief whirlwind courtship, he married 20-year-old Dorothy Goetz of Buffalo, New York, the sister of one of Berlin's collaborators, E. Ray Goetz. During their honeymoon in Havana, she contracted typhoid fever, and doctors were unable to treat her illness when she returned to New York. She died July 17 of that year. Left with writer's block for months after Goetz's death, he eventually wrote his first ballad, "When I Lost You", to express his grief.

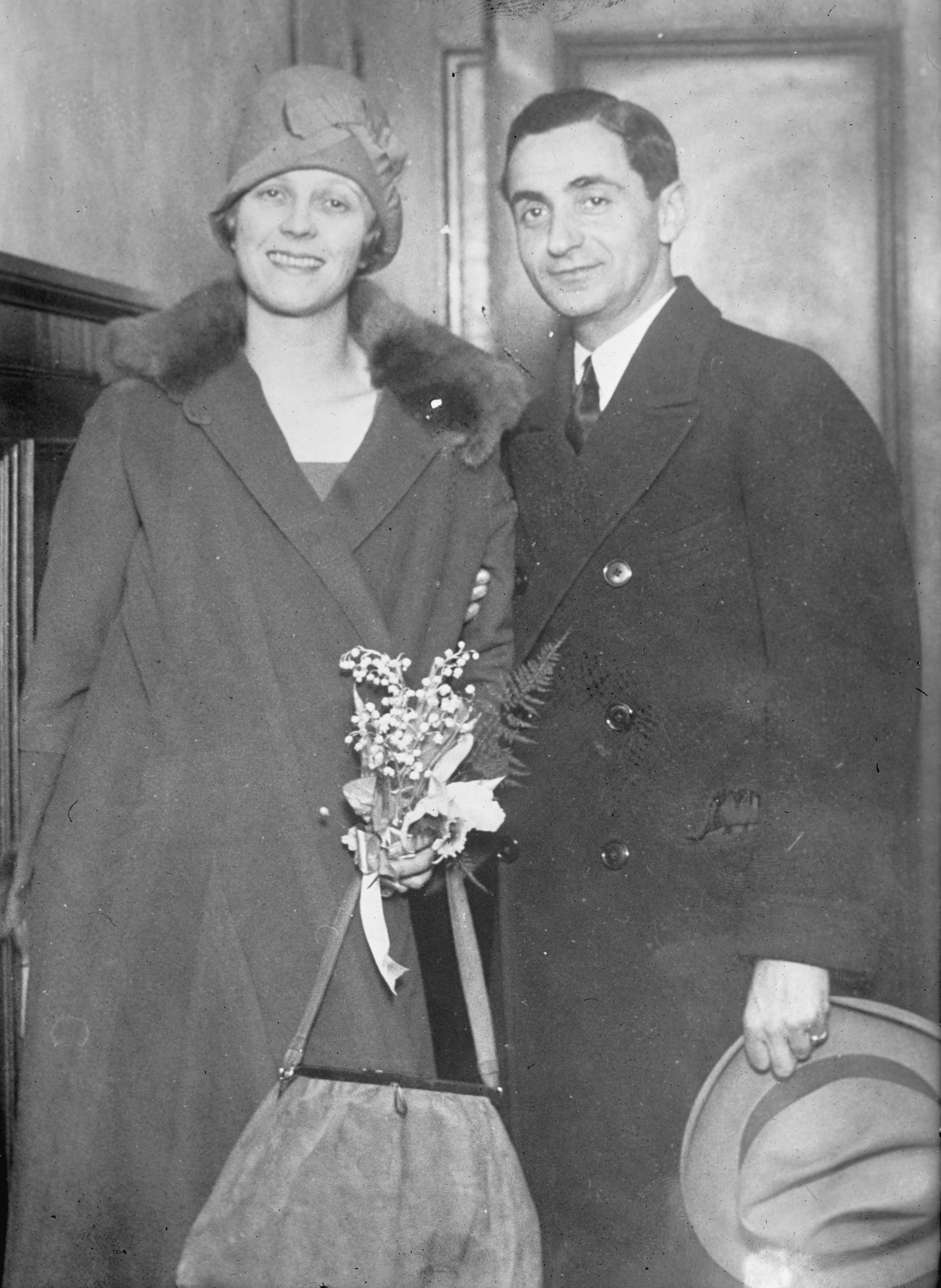
With wife Ellin, c. 1926

Years later, in the 1920s, he fell in love with young author and heiress Ellin Mackay. Because Berlin was Jewish and she was a Catholic of Irish descent, their life was followed by the press, which found the romance of an immigrant from the Lower East Side and a young heiress a good story. Mackay's father, Clarence Mackay, the socially prominent head of the Postal Telegraph Cable Company, objected to their marriage.

They had met in 1924, and her father opposed the match from the start. He sent her off to Europe to find other suitors and forget Berlin. However, Berlin wooed her with letters and songs over the airwaves, such as "Remember" and "All Alone", and she wrote him daily. Biographer Philip Furia writes that newspapers rumored they were engaged before she returned from Europe, and some Broadway shows even performed skits of the "lovelorn songwriter". After her return, she and Berlin were besieged by the press, which followed them everywhere. Variety reported that her father vowed that their marriage "would only happen 'over my dead body.'" As a result, they decided to elope and were married in a simple civil ceremony at the Municipal Building away from media attention.

The wedding news made the front page of The New York Times. The marriage took her father by surprise, and he was stunned when he read about it. The bride's mother, however, who was at the time divorced from Mackay, wanted her daughter to follow the dictates of her own heart. Berlin had gone to her mother's home before the wedding and had obtained her blessing.

There followed reports that the bride's father disowned his daughter because of the marriage. In response, Berlin gave her the rights to "Always", a song still played at weddings, as a wedding present. Ellin was thereby guaranteed a steady income regardless of what might happen with the marriage. For nearly three years, Clarence Mackay refused to speak to the Berlins, but they reconciled after the death of the Berlins' son, Irving Berlin Jr., on Christmas Day 1928, less than one month after he was born.

Their marriage remained a love affair, and they were inseparable until she died in July 1988 at the age of 85. They had four children during their 63 years of marriage: Mary Ellin Barrett in 1926, Irving Berlin Jr., who died in infancy in 1928, Linda Louise Emmet in 1932, and Elizabeth Irving Peters in 1936.

=== Lifestyle ===
In 1916, in the earlier phase of Berlin's career, producer and composer George M. Cohan, during a toast to the young Berlin at a Friar's Club dinner in his honor, said, "The thing I like about Irvie is that although he has moved up-town and made lots of money, it hasn't turned his head. He hasn't forgotten his friends, he doesn't wear funny clothes, and you will find his watch and his handkerchief in his pockets, where they belong."

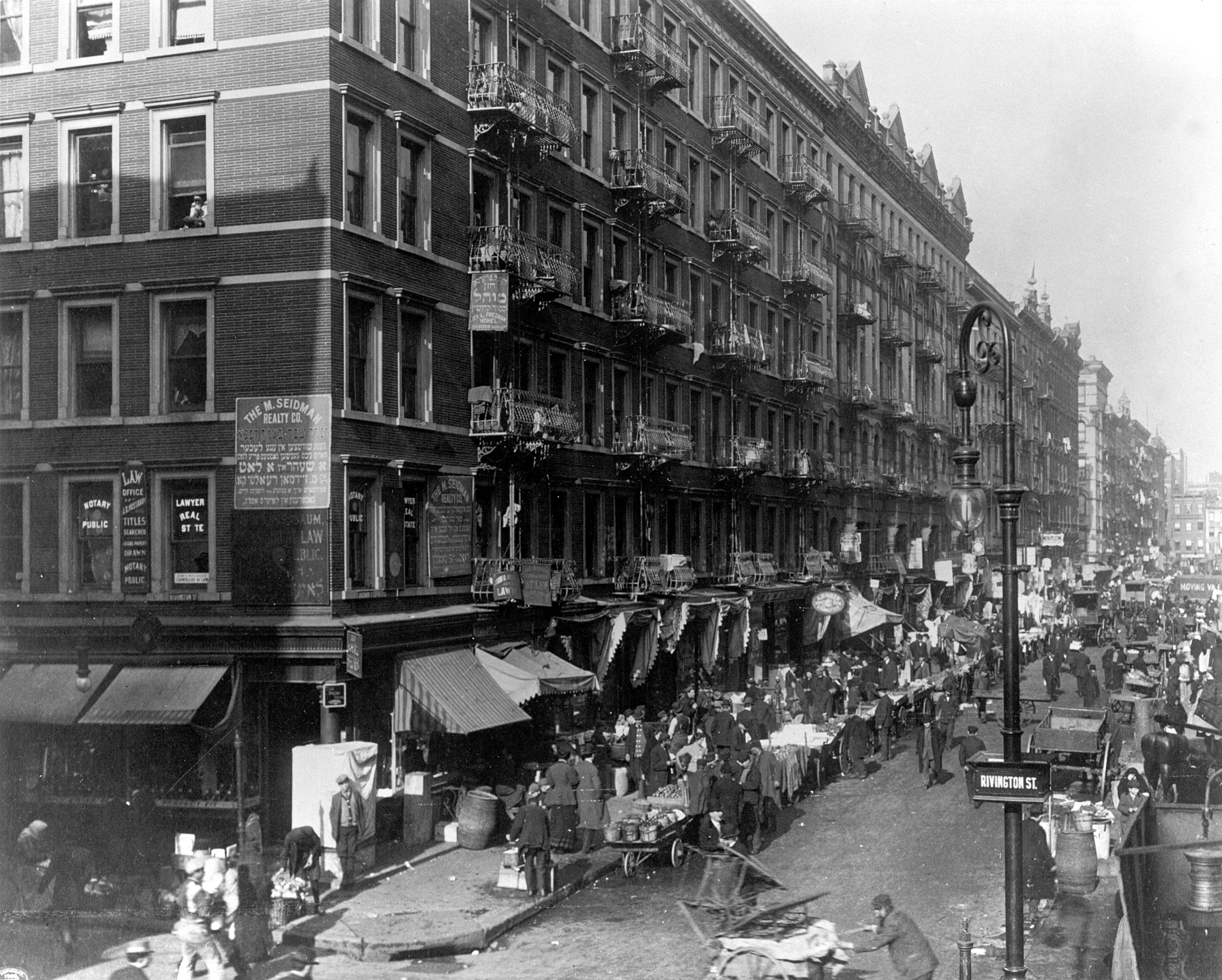
The Lower East Side in 1909. Berlin said he never forgot his childhood years when he slept under tenement steps, ate scraps, wore secondhand clothes and sold newspapers. "Every man should have a Lower East Side in his life," he said.

Furia says that throughout Berlin's life he often returned on foot to his old neighborhoods in Union Square, Chinatown, and the Bowery. He never forgot those childhood years when he "slept under tenement steps, ate scraps, and wore secondhand clothes," and described those years as hard but good. "Every man should have a Lower East Side in his life," he said. He used to visit The Music Box Theater, which he founded and which still stands at 239 West 45th St. From 1947 to 1989, Berlin's home in New York City was 17 Beekman Place.

George Frazier of Life magazine found Berlin to be "intensely nervous", with a habit of tapping his listener with his index finger to emphasize a point, and continually pressing his hair down in back and "picking up any stray crumbs left on a table after a meal". While listening, "he leans forward tensely, with his hands clasped below his knees like a prizefighter waiting in his corner for the bell.... For a man who has known so much glory", wrote Frazier, "Berlin has somehow managed to retain the enthusiasm of a novice."

Berlin's daughter wrote in her memoir that her father was a loving, if workaholic, family man who was "basically an upbeat person, with down periods". In his final decades, he retreated from public life. He did not attend the televised Carnegie Hall celebration of his 100th birthday. Her parents liked to celebrate every single holiday with their children, and "[t]hey seemed to understand the importance, particularly in childhood, of the special day, the same every year, the special stories, foods, and decorations and that special sense of well-being that accompanies a holiday." Although he did comment to his daughter about her mother's lavish Christmas spending, he remarked, "I gave up trying to get your mother to economize. It was easier just to make more money."

Berlin voted for both Democratic and Republican presidential candidates. He supported the presidential candidacy of General Dwight Eisenhower, and his song "I Like Ike" featured prominently in the Eisenhower campaign. In his later years, he also became more conservative in his views on music. According to his daughter, "He was consumed by patriotism." He often said, "I owe all my success to my adopted country," and once rejected his lawyers' advice of investing in tax shelters, insisting, "I want to pay taxes. I love this country."

Berlin was a Freemason, and was a member of Munn Lodge no. 190, New York City, the Scottish Rite Valley of New York City, and Mecca Shrine Temple.

Berlin was a member of the Benevolent and Protective Order of Elks.

Berlin was a staunch advocate of civil rights. He was honored in 1944 by the National Conference of Christians and Jews for "advancing the aims of the conference to eliminate religious and racial conflict". His 1943 production This Is The Army featured the first integrated division army unit in the United States. In 1949, the Young Men's Hebrew Association (YMHA) honored him as one of the twelve "most outstanding Americans of Jewish faith". While he was ethnically and culturally Jewish, he was religiously agnostic. Berlin's Civil Rights Movement support also made him a target of the FBI Director J. Edgar Hoover, who continuously investigated him for years.

== Death ==
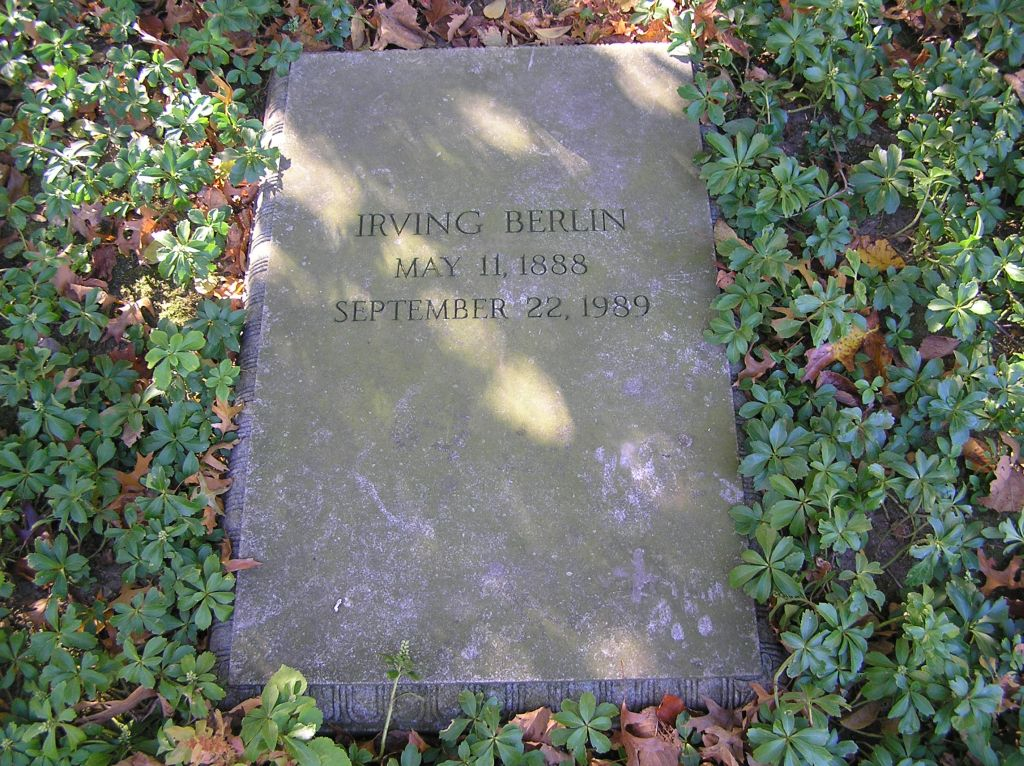
The grave of Irving Berlin in Woodlawn Cemetery, the Bronx, New York

Berlin died in his sleep at his 17 Beekman Place town house in Manhattan on September 22, 1989, at the age of 101, of a heart attack and other natural causes. He was interred in the Woodlawn Cemetery in The Bronx, New York.

On the evening following the announcement of his death, the marquee lights of Broadway playhouses were dimmed before curtain time in his memory. President George H. W. Bush said Berlin was "a legendary man whose words and music will help define the history of our nation". Just minutes before his statement was released, the President joined a crowd of thousands to sing Berlin's "God Bless America" at a luncheon in Boston. Former President Ronald Reagan, who costarred in Berlin's 1943 musical This Is the Army, said, "Nancy and I are deeply saddened by the death of a wonderfully talented man whose musical genius delighted and stirred millions and will live on forever."

Morton Gould, the composer and conductor who was president of the American Society of Composers, Authors and Publishers (ASCAP), of which Berlin was a founder, said, "What to me is fascinating about this unique genius is that he touched so many people in so many age groups over so many years. He sounded our deepest feelings—happiness, sadness, celebration, loneliness." Ginger Rogers, who danced to Berlin tunes with Fred Astaire, told The Associated Press upon hearing of Berlin's death that working with him had been "like heaven". (Note: After his death, Irving Berlin's three daughters donated the songwriter's musical collection of 750,000 items to the music archives of the Library of Congress.)

== Legacy and influence ==
Other nations are defined by their classical composers. America is appropriately defined musically by this Russian immigrant...Germany has Beethoven, France, Ravel, Poland, Chopin, Italy, Verdi; America has Irving Berlin. Though he's not here with us tonight, he will be with us always. Wherever there is America, there is Irving Berlin.

— Walter Cronkite
Kennedy Center Tribute to Irving Berlin, 1987

The New York Times, after his death in 1989, wrote, "Irving Berlin set the tone and the tempo for the tunes America played and sang and danced to for much of the 20th century." His life as an immigrant from Russia became the "classic rags-to-riches story that he never forgot could have happened only in America". A legend by the time he turned 30, he went on to write an estimated 1,500 songs during his career. He composed the scores for 20 original Broadway shows and 15 original Hollywood films, with his songs nominated for Academy Awards on eight occasions. Music historian Susannah McCorkle writes that "in scope, quantity, and quality his work was amazing." Others, such as Broadway musician Anne Phillips, called him "an American institution."

During his six-decade career, from 1907 to 1966, he produced sheet music, Broadway shows, recordings, and scores played on radio, in films and on television, and his tunes continue to evoke powerful emotions for millions around the world. He wrote songs like "Alexander's Ragtime Band", "Cheek to Cheek", "There's No Business Like Show Business", "Blue Skies" and "Puttin' On the Ritz". Some of his songs have become holiday anthems, such as "Easter Parade", "White Christmas" and "Happy Holiday". "White Christmas" alone sold over 50 million records, the top-selling song in recording history. It won an ASCAP and an Academy Award, and is one of the most frequently played songs ever written.

In 1938, "God Bless America" became the unofficial national anthem of the United States, and on September 11, 2001, members of the House of Representatives stood on the steps of the Capitol and solemnly sang "God Bless America" together. The song again became popular shortly after 9/11, when Celine Dion recorded it as the title track of a 9/11 benefit album. The following year, the Postal Service issued a commemorative stamp of Berlin. By then, the Boy Scouts and Girl Scouts of New York had received more than $10 million in royalties from "God Bless America" as a result of Berlin's donation of royalties. According to music historian Gary Giddins,

No other songwriter has written as many anthems... No one else has written as many pop songs, period... [H]is gift for economy, directness, and slang, presents Berlin as an obsessive, often despairing commentator on the passing scene.

In 1934, Time put him on its cover and inside hailed "this itinerant son of a Russian cantor" as "an American institution". And again, in 1943, the same magazine described his songs as follows:

They possess a permanence not generally associated with Tin Pan Alley products and it is more than remotely possible that in days to come Berlin will be looked upon as the Stephen Foster of the 20th century.

At various times, his songs were also rallying cries for different causes: He produced musical editorials supporting Al Smith and Dwight Eisenhower as presidential candidates, he wrote songs opposing Prohibition, defending the gold standard, calming the wounds of the Great Depression, and helping the war against Hitler, and in 1950 he wrote an anthem for the state of Israel. Biographer David Leopold adds that "We all know his songs... they are all part of who we are."

Berlin inadvertently influenced American law when his publishing group sued Mad Magazine for copyright infringement in 1961. The humor magazine had published a collection of parody lyrics which it said could be "sung to the tune of" many popular songs. Berlin objected, and Irving Berlin et al. v. E.C. Publications, Inc. would ultimately become a landmark case. Mad prevailed at every stage. The U.S. District Court for the Southern District of New York ruled largely in favor of Mad in 1963, but Judge Charles Metzner decided that two of the 25 disputed parodies - "Always" (sung to the tune of "Always") and "There's No Business Like No Business" (sung to the tune of "There's No Business Like Show Business") - would require a trial because they relied on the same verbal hooks ("always" and "business") as the originals.

The music publishers pressed on. The following year, the U.S. Court of Appeals not only upheld the pro-Mad decision in regard to the 23 songs, it adopted an approach that was broad enough to strip the publishers of their limited victory regarding the remaining two songs. Writing a unanimous opinion for the United States Court of Appeals for the Second Circuit, Circuit Judge Irving Kaufman observed, "We doubt that even so eminent a composer as plaintiff Irving Berlin should be permitted to claim a property interest in iambic pentameter." The publishers again appealed, but the U.S. Supreme Court refused to hear the appeal, allowing the decision to stand. The precedent-setting 1964 ruling established the rights of parodists and satirists to mimic the meter of popular songs.

At his 100th-birthday celebration in May 1988, violinist Isaac Stern said, "The career of Irving Berlin and American music were intertwined forever ... American music was born at his piano", while songwriter Sammy Cahn pointed out: "If a man, in a lifetime of 50 years, can point to six songs that are immediately identifiable, he has achieved something. Irving Berlin can sing 60 that are immediately identifiable... [Y]ou couldn't have a holiday without his permission." Composer Douglas Moore added:

It's a rare gift which sets Irving Berlin apart from all other contemporary songwriters. It is a gift which qualifies him, along with Stephen Foster, Walt Whitman, Vachel Lindsay and Carl Sandburg, as a great American minstrel. He has caught and immortalized in his songs what we say, what we think about, and what we believe.

ASCAP's records show that 25 of Berlin's songs reached the top of the charts and were re-recorded by dozens of famous singers over the years, such as Eddie Fisher, Al Jolson, Bing Crosby, Frank Sinatra, Barbra Streisand, Linda Ronstadt, Rosemary Clooney, Doris Day, Diana Ross, Nat King Cole and Ella Fitzgerald. In 1924, when Berlin was 36, his biography, The Story of Irving Berlin, was being written by Alexander Woollcott. In a letter to Woollcott, Jerome Kern offered what one writer said "may be the last word" on the significance of Irving Berlin:

Irving Berlin has no place in American music—he is American music. Emotionally, he honestly absorbs the vibrations emanating from the people, manners and life of his time and, in turn, gives these impressions back to the world—simplified, clarified and glorified.

Composer George Gershwin (1898–1937) also tried to describe the importance of Berlin's compositions:

I want to say at once that I frankly believe that Irving Berlin is the greatest songwriter that has ever lived.... His songs are exquisite cameos of perfection, and each one of them is as beautiful as its neighbor. Irving Berlin remains, I think, America's Schubert. But apart from his genuine talent for song-writing, Irving Berlin has had a greater influence upon American music than any other one man. It was Irving Berlin who was the very first to have created a real, inherent American music.... Irving Berlin was the first to free the American song from the nauseating sentimentality which had previously characterized it, and by introducing and perfecting ragtime he had actually given us the first germ of an American musical idiom; he had sown the first seeds of an American music.

== Awards and honors ==
- Academy Award for Best Original Song in 1943 for "White Christmas" in Holiday Inn.
- US Army Medal of Merit from General George Marshall at the direction of President Harry S. Truman.
- Tony Award for Best Original Score in 1951 for the musical Call Me Madam.
- Congressional Gold Medal in 1954 from President Dwight D. Eisenhower for contributing many patriotic songs, including "God Bless America".
- Special Tony Award in 1963.
- Grammy Lifetime Achievement Award in 1968.
- Songwriters Hall of Fame in 1970, which "celebrated its First annual Induction and Awards Ceremony in New York City".
- Presidential Medal of Freedom in 1977 by President Gerald Ford. The citation reads, in part: "Musician, Composer, Humanitarian, And Patriot, Irving Berlin Has Captured The Fondest Dreams And Deepest Emotions Of The American People In The Form Of Popular Music."
- Lawrence Langner Memorial Award for Distinguished Lifetime Achievement in the American Theatre at the 1978 Tony Awards.
- Medal of Liberty during centennial celebrations for the Statue of Liberty in 1986.
- 100th-birthday celebration concert was for the benefit of Carnegie Hall and ASCAP on May 11, 1988.
- Jewish–American Hall of Fame in 1988.
- Star on the Hollywood Walk of Fame on February 1, 1994.
- American Theater Hall of Fame.

== Musical scores ==
The following list includes scores mostly produced by Berlin. Although some of the plays using his songs were later adapted to films, the list will not include the film unless he was the primary composer.

=== Stage ===
- Watch Your Step (1914)
- Stop! Look! Listen! (1915)
- The Century Girl (1916)
- Yip Yip Yaphank (1918)
- Ziegfeld Follies (1919)
- Ziegfeld Follies (1920)
- Music Box Revue (1921)
- Music Box Revue (1922)
- Music Box Revue (1923)
- Music Box Revue (1924)
- The Cocoanuts (1925)
- Ziegfeld Follies (1927)
- Face the Music (1932)
- As Thousands Cheer (1933)
- Louisiana Purchase (1940)
- This Is The Army (1942)
- Annie Get Your Gun (1946)
- Miss Liberty (1949)
- Call Me Madam (1950)
- Mr. President (1962)
- White Christmas (2004 posthumous production)
- Top Hat (2012 posthumous production)
- Holiday Inn (2016 posthumous production)

=== Film scores ===
- The Cocoanuts (1929) *
- Hallelujah (1929)
- Puttin' On the Ritz (1930)
- Mammy (1930)
- Reaching for the Moon (1930)
- Top Hat (1935)
- Follow the Fleet (1936)
- On the Avenue (1937)
- Carefree (1938)
- Alexander's Ragtime Band (1938)
- Second Fiddle (1939)
- Holiday Inn (1942)
- This Is the Army (1943) *
- Blue Skies (1946)
- Easter Parade (1948)
- Annie Get Your Gun (1950) *
- Call Me Madam (1953) *
- There's No Business Like Show Business (1954)
- White Christmas (1954)
- Sayonara Sayonara Goodbay (1957)

*Denotes films originally written for the stage

== Sources ==
- Barrett, Mary Ellin (1994). Irving Berlin: A Daughter's Memoir. Simon & Schuster. ISBN 0-671-72533-5.
- Hamm, Charles, editor (1994). Early Songs, 1907–1914. Music of the United States of America (MUSA) volume 2. Madison, Wisconsin: A-R Editions.
- Hischak, Thomas S. (1991). Word Crazy, Broadway Lyricists from Cohan to Sondheim. Bloomsbury Academic. ISBN 0-275-93849-2.
- Magee, Jeffrey (2012). Irving Berlin's American Musical Theatre. Oxford: Oxford University Press, 2012. ISBN 978-0-19-539826-7.
- Rosen, Jody (2002). White Christmas: The Story of an American Song. Scribner. ISBN 0-7432-1875-2.
- Sears, Benjamin, editor (2012). The Irving Berlin Reader. Oxford: Oxford University Press, 2012. ISBN 978-0-19-538374-4.
