= Oh! How I Hate to Get Up in the Morning =

1918 song written by Irving Berlin

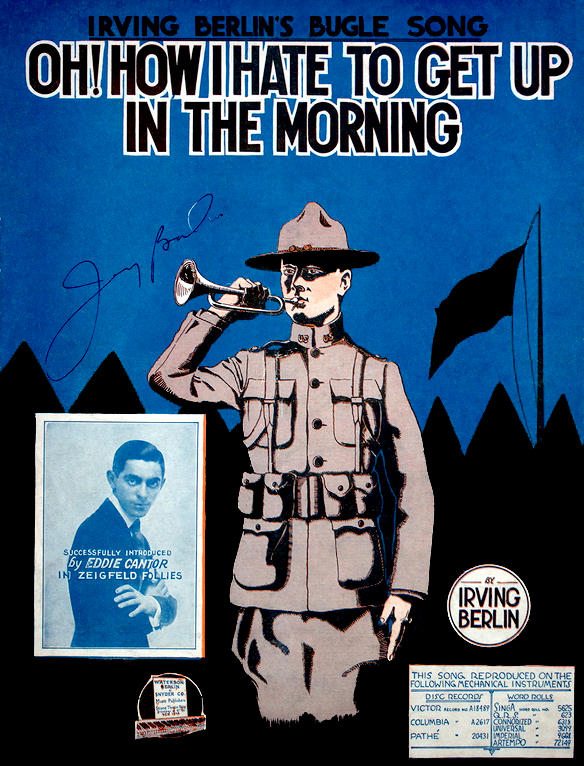
Cover page to the sheet music

"Oh! How I Hate to Get Up in the Morning" is a song written by Irving Berlin in 1918 that gives a comic perspective on military life. Berlin composed the song as an expression of protest against the indignities of Army routine shortly after being drafted into the United States Army in 1918. The song soon made the rounds of camp and became popular with other soldiers, partly because hatred of reveille was universal.

The commanding officer of Camp Upton in eastern Long Island took an interest in Berlin's talents and assigned him to write and produce a fundraising benefit to raise funds for a new visitors' center at the base. The show was entitled Yip, Yip, Yaphank after the Camp Upton locale in Yaphank, New York.

Although Berlin initially wrote "Oh! How I Hate to Get Up in the Morning" without commercial intent, it eventually appeared in three different Broadway shows, including Ziegfeld Follies of 1918, and the film This Is the Army. More than any other Irving Berlin song, it became the one most associated with Berlin as a performer.

== Background ==
"Oh! How I Hate to Get Up in the Morning"
Sung by Arthur Fields in 1919

Irving Berlin was born in the Russian Empire in 1888, either in Tolochin or Tyumen, and had moved with his family to New York City in 1893. After achieving fame as a songwriter, he acquired United States citizenship in early 1918 with the expectation that his medical history and age of 30 would exempt him from his final year of draft eligibility. So it came as an unpleasant surprise that within months Berlin was drafted and serving as a private at Camp Upton at a salary of $30 a month, far below his usual earnings. Although as a civilian he employed a private valet, as an Army private he was compelled to perform unskilled labor in support of camp operations. "There were a lot of things about army life I didn't like", said Berlin, "and the thing I didn't like most of all was reveille."

During World War I, Berlin was drafted into the United States Army's 152nd Depot Brigade shortly after he became a naturalized United States citizen in 1918. By the time he entered the service the war was in its final months and prospects for victory were steadily improving. He was assigned to a camp on eastern Long Island that was mainly an interim station for infantry troops headed overseas.

== Composition ==
The incident that inspired Berlin to write "Oh! How I Hate to Get Up in the Morning" was an occasion when a colonel wanted a group of buglers to play George M. Cohan's "Over There". The buglers were unable to comply because it exceeded the range of their instruments, so the oblivious officer ordered them to practice Cohan's song. He wrote it as "a thin little sergeant."

Berlin's civilian work schedule had been that of a hardworking night owl, generally writing material until two or three in the morning. His efforts to adjust to military life and become a good soldier included springing out of bed obediently each morning, which earned him the resentment of fellow soldiers because he concealed his hatred of reveille too well and appeared eager to wake up in the mornings.

So during an era when popular songs about war praised its heroism, Berlin instead gave voice to the subversive impulses shared by ordinary soldiers. The lyrics begin with a mundane recounting of a newly recruited soldier's camp life and progress to hyperbole as he describes a series of increasingly absurd plans to escape from morning reveille.

"Someday I'm going to murder the bugler,
Someday they're going to find him dead;
I'll amputate his reveille
and step upon it heavily,
and spend the rest of my life in bed."

Berlin would later describe the song as "a protest written from the heart out, absolutely without the slightest thought that it would ever earn a cent". He wrote the song before any plans for a larger production were underway and it soon gained popularity around the camp.

== Production ==
The camp's commanding officer Major General J. Franklin Bell called Berlin into his office and asked the showman to raise funds for a new community house to lodge families of service members who visited the camp. The projected expense of the project was $35,000. At first, Berlin called in favors from civilian colleagues to visit and put on local performances to boost morale, but news of a Navy fundraising show on Broadway called Boom Boom inspired Berlin to request permission to write and stage a full Broadway production of their own.

The songwriter not only obtained permission for the show, Yip Yip Yaphank, but also received General Bell's personal permission to return to Berlin's normal creative working schedule and a special exemption from reveille. Civilian musician Harry Ruby joined Berlin in camp to transcribe and arrange the music and collaborate on the show.

== Parodies ==
Berlin's song "inspired a dozen parodies." An uncredited parody was recounted in The New York Times:

Oh, how I hate to go into the mess hall!
Oh, how I long for the foods at home!
For it isn't hard to guess
Why they call the meals a mess-
You've got to eat beans, you've got to eat beans,
You've got to eat beans in the Army.

== Performances ==
The song was performed in soldier revues including 1918's Yip Yip Yaphank, and Ziegfeld Follies of 1918, as well as in 113 Broadway performances of This Is The Army in 1942. Jack Haley sang "Oh! How I Hate to Get Up in the Morning" in the 1938 movie Alexander's Ragtime Band and in 1938 Alice Faye and Ethel Merman also sang the song at the Roxy Theatre in New York City. It was sung at a 1941 war rally against the America First Committee by New York City Mayor Fiorello La Guardia in Philadelphia.

The song is sung in the 1932 Screen Songs short featuring Betty Boop entitled Oh! How I Hate to Get Up in the Morning.

=== Yip Yip Yaphank ===
The song appeared in two shows of 1918: Yip Yip Yaphank and Ziegfeld Follies of 1918. Yip Yip Yaphank opened on August 19 and Berlin made his entrance late in the show, being dragged from a pup tent by two other soldiers as he pretended to be asleep on his feet to sing "Oh! How I Hate to Get Up in the Morning". The song was a centerpiece of the show; both it and Berlin's performance received favorable reviews. According to reviewers, Berlin's voice was thin but his timing was perfect and he presented a hilarious stage persona. 24 years later, The New York Times declared Yip "an immediate hit."

George M. Cohan may have conveyed the spirit of the aggressive patriotism in his rousing "Over There", but it was Berlin who caught the more human emotions of the lowly soldier in such poignant pieces as "Oh, How I Hate to Get Up In the Morning" and "Kitchen Police" ...

— Stanley Green, The World of Musical Comedy: The Story of the American Musical Stage as Told Through the Careers of Its Foremost Composers and Lyricists

The show was extended twice and exceeded its fundraising goal of $35,000. Estimates of the proceeds range from $83,000 to over $158,000, but the planned visitor center was never built because the war ended shortly afterward and Berlin was never informed what happened to the money. Berlin received no financial benefit beyond his ordinary sergeant's pay, but he was well compensated in publicity. He was recognized as a Broadway star wherever he went after he returned to civilian life. Along with the acclaim, however, he also "received a death threat and a kidnapping threat", which he took seriously enough to purchase a bulletproof limousine and hire a bodyguard/chauffeur.

=== This Is the Army ===
Berlin also performed "Oh! How I Hate to Get Up in the Morning" in the 1942 stage play This Is The Army, which ran for 113 performances on Broadway and was adapted as a Warner Brothers musical the following year. It was declared the "modern version of Yip, Yip, Yaphank," and contained "all-new music" except for two or three songs. Twenty-five years after the original show, he was still dark haired and wiry, but his face was strained. More importantly, his voice—which had never been strong—was weakened from months of recent stage touring. The number was filmed in late afternoon when he expected his voice to be at its best, but an internal studio memo still reported, "Irving Berlin is no singer." Berlin wrote about the filming in an April 10, 1943 letter:

Today they finished shooting my portion of the picture and I am certainly glad it's over with. All I do is sing "Hate to Get Up in the Morning" as I did in the show, but the camera is a severe judge and I am afraid even with the great amount of care and fuss they can't improve what the Fates decreed to be a homely face. As for my voice, I made a recording. When the record was first played on the set, one of the electricians, who didn't know whose voice it was, said, "If the guy who wrote that song could hear the record, he would turn over in his grave"--which gives you a fair idea. However I am hoping it won't be too bad.

In May 1988 The Tonight Show Band honored Irving Berlin's one hundredth birthday by playing "Oh! How I Hate to Get Up in the Morning" as part of a medley in tribute to the songwriter at the close of a show.

In 2016, June and earlier, the song was used in ads by McDonald's restaurants for the breakfast menu.
