= Transposing piano =

Piano mechanism

A transposing piano is a special piano with a mechanism (operated by a pedal or lever) that changes the keyboard position relative to the action (see Development of the modern piano for details). This transposes (changes the key of) any particular keyboard fingering.

A transposing piano enables a person who knows a composition's fingerings in a certain key but who cannot transpose that composition from one key to another to continue playing in the latter key using the fingerings of the familiar key. More generally, a person who learns keyboard fingerings on the basis of relative pitch with respect to the tonic of any given composition can use a transposing piano to play along with a choir and/or orchestra performing in any key. A correlative disadvantage is that individuals with absolute pitch may have difficulty playing on such a piano because the pitches they actually hear do not match the notes they are playing on the keyboard when its correspondence between nominally played note and generated pitch is altered.

Transposing pianos were never common, and few still exist.

Irving Berlin had two such instruments. In 1972 he donated one piano (built in 1940 by Weser Bros. Company in New York City, NY) to the Smithsonian Institution. It is now on display in the National Museum of American Jewish History. Berlin never learned to read music, playing his songs entirely by ear in the key of F-sharp (keeping all five notes of the pentatonic scale on the “black keys”), employing his “trick piano” to do the work as necessary.

Many electronic or digital pianos and keyboards can transpose. The harmonium sometimes features a mechanically shifted keyboard for transposition. A guitar capo has much the same effect.
