= Yip Yip Yaphank =

1918 musical by Irving Berlin

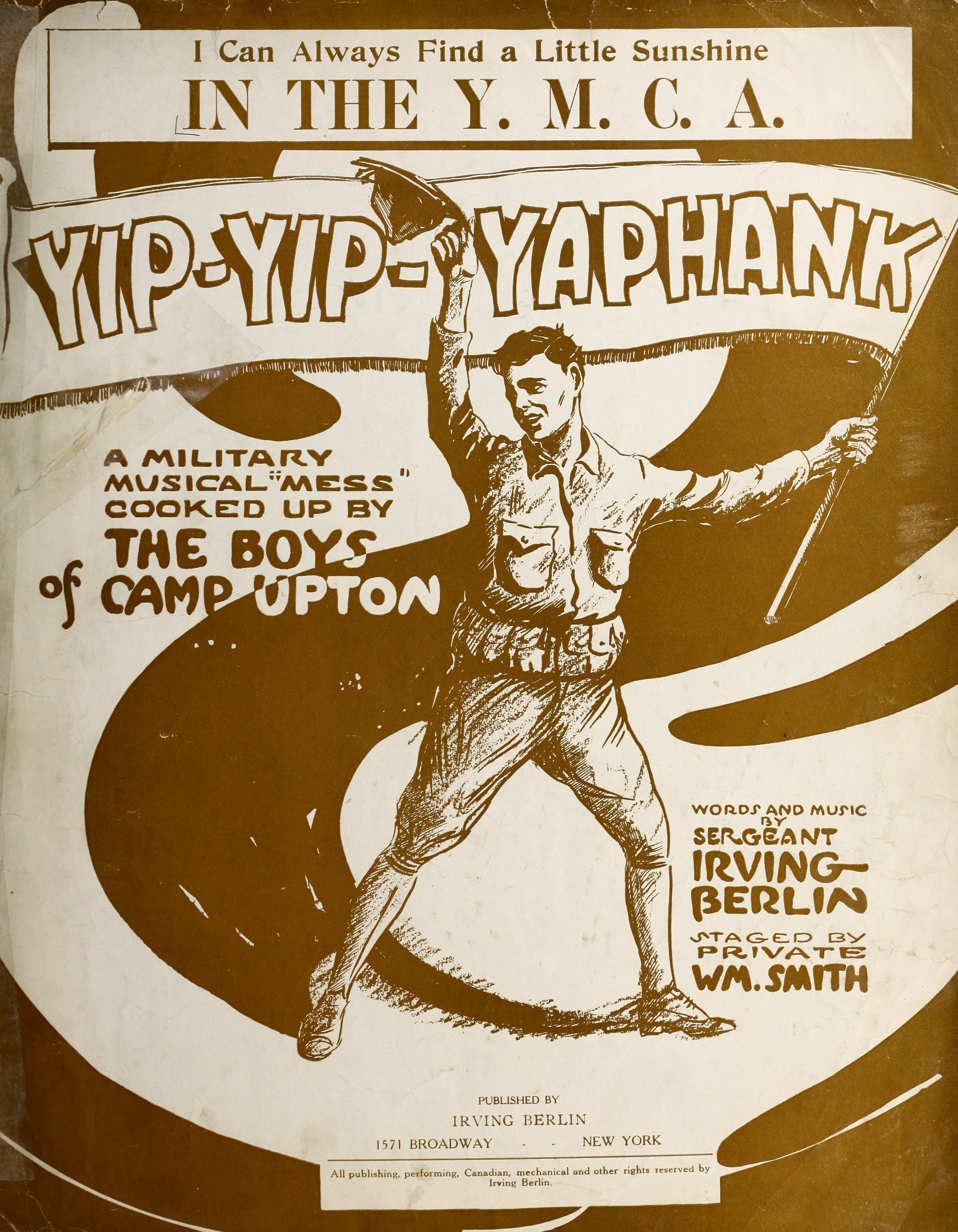
- Music: Irving Berlin
- Lyrics: Irving Berlin
- Productions: 1918 Broadway

Yip Yip Yaphank is a 1918 musical revue by Irving Berlin. He wrote and produced the show during World War I, after he was drafted into the United States Army and was serving in 152nd Depot Brigade at Camp Upton in Yaphank, New York. The military revue was performed by the soldiers of Camp Upton. It moved to Broadway after a brief tryout at the camp.

== From idea to the stage ==
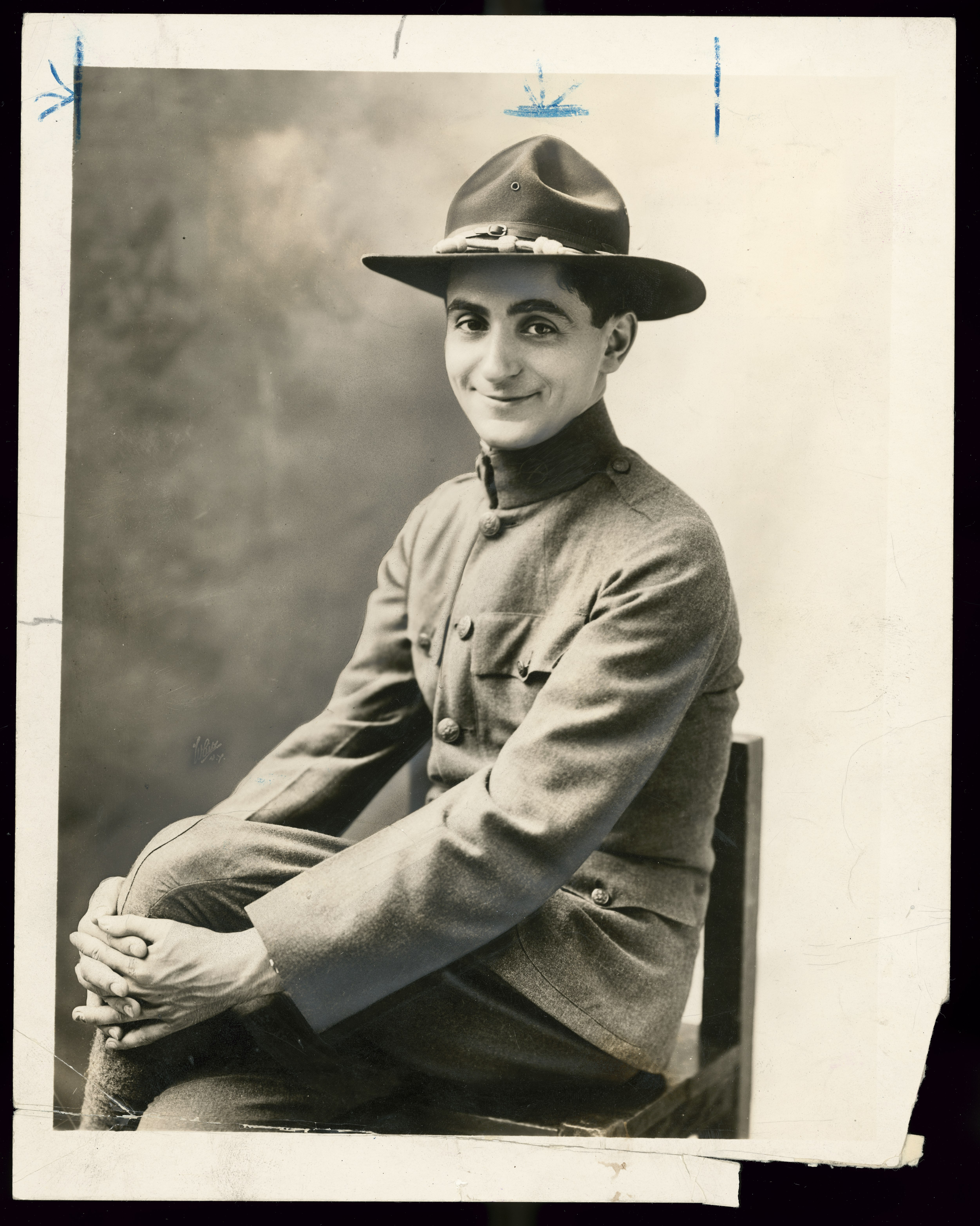
Sgt. Irving Berlin shortly before Yip Yip Yaphank moved from Camp Upton to Broadway

The commanding officer at Camp Upton had wanted to build a community building on the grounds of the army base, and thought that Sgt. Berlin could help raise the $35,000 needed for its construction. Berlin's song, "Oh! How I Hate to Get Up in the Morning," an everyman song for soldiers, was the basis of a revue full of army recruits—a source of manpower available for him to use. He called his friend and co-worker Harry Ruby to join him in writing down the flurry of songs that Berlin created, including "God Bless America", which Berlin eventually omitted from the play for being too sticky.

In July 1918, Yip Yip Yaphank had a tryout run at Camp Upton's little Liberty Theatre, before moving on to Central Park West's Century Theatre in August. The show was typical of revues and follies, featuring acrobatics, dancers, jugglers, and featured a demonstration by Lightweight Boxing Champion Benny Leonard. Included with the performances were military drills choreographed to music by Berlin.

The show had comedy, including males dressed as Ziegfeld girls, and Sgt. Berlin as the reluctant soldier not wanting to join in reveille during the "Oh! How I Hate to Get Up in the Morning" skit.

The finale, "We're On Our Way to France", was the replacement for "God Bless America". During this act, the whole company wore their full gear, and marched out of the theater, down the aisles and out to the street. During the Century Theatre run, the "performers" stayed at an armory downtown, and usually marched right back to the armory after the evening show.

In September 1918, the production had to move to the Lexington Theatre, where it eventually ended its run. On that night, the audience saw the usual ending, with the battle-ready men marching off to "war" but with a slight diversion. After the main performers marched through the aisles, Sgt. Irving Berlin and the rest of the crew were similarly dressed and marched out of the theater. This time, the men were going off to war, actually heading to France.

== After the curtain ==
The play earned the U.S. Army $80,000 ($1.7 million in 2025 dollars) for Camp Upton's Community Building, though the army never had it built. Irving Berlin didn't go to France, and was listed among other great songwriters and playwrights of the time, well up to the next great war.

== Songs ==
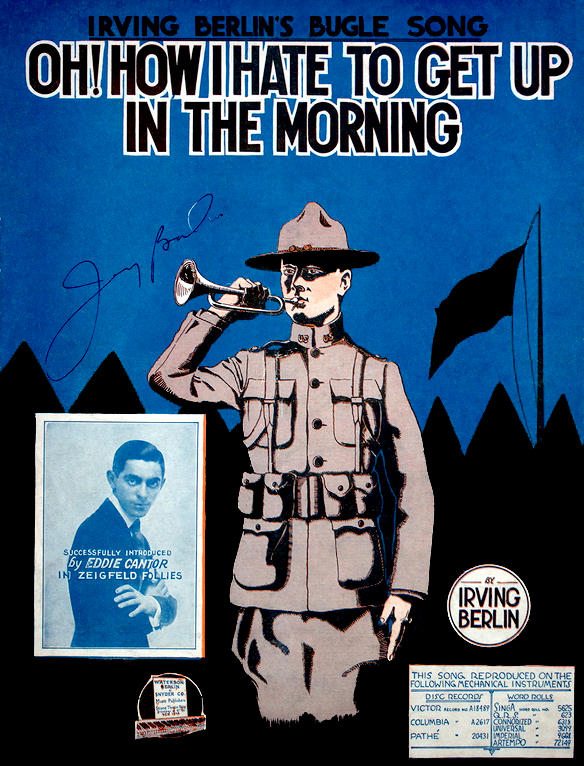
Sheet music cover of "Oh! How I Hate to Get Up in the Morning"

Oh! How I Hate to Get Up in the Morning
The hit song of the show, Oh! How I Hate to Get Up in the Morning, sung by Arthur Fields in 1919

Oh! How I Hate to Get Up in the Morning
Another version, by Irving Kaufman.

- "You Can't Stay Up on Bevo"
- "Oh! How I Hate to Get Up in the Morning"
- "I Can Always Find a Little Sunshine in the Y.M.C.A."
- "Kitchen Police"
- "Dream On, Little Soldier Boy"
- "Mandy" (a major song in a blackface minstrel number, later featured in the 1919 edition of the Ziegfeld Follies)
- "We're On Our Way to France"
- "The Girl I left Behind"
- "Ragtime Razor Brigade"
- "Ever Since I Put on a Uniform"
- "Page Boy"
- "Floradora Sextette"
- "Love Interest"
- "Dreams of a Soldier"
- "Some Boy'
- "Darktown Strutters' Ball"
- "Waters of Venice"
- "Baby"
- "White's Pet"
- "Don't Know the Half"
- "Fancy Free"
- "On Our Way to France"
- "God Bless America" - originally written for the play but not included. It was included in the sequel to Yip Yip Yaphank, This Is the Army in 1943

== Adaptations ==
The first adaptation of Yip Yip Yaphank! after being performed on Broadway was in the 1943 film This Is the Army. In this film, the character Jerry Jones is seen preparing to perform Yip Yip Yaphank! with his fellow soldiers. Most of the show is not depicted in this film, but the finale "We're On Our Way to France" is performed in the same way it was during the last show at the Lexington Theater in 1918.

The soldiers are shown marching out of the theater into the streets in full field equipment where they get into military trucks to ship off to war. The film featured Berlin singing "Oh How I Hate to Get Up in the Morning", as was done in the original 1918 production.

The next adaptation wasn't until November 2010, when the show was revisited by American Classics. American Classics is an organization that performs historical musicals and musical revues in the Greater Boston Area. This performance was the first ever revival of Yip Yip Yaphank! and featured all of the original songs from the 1918 production. American Classics performed another revival of the show in 2018 for its 100th anniversary.

In November 2018, Yip Yip Yaphank was performed by the students of Longwood High School, as a commemoration of the 100th anniversary of the show's debut. The Longwood Central School District services the town of Yaphank where the musical revue was originally performed and conceived. This depiction contained many of the original songs and skits from the original performance. One change made to the show was the reintroduction of the song God Bless America.

Extensive research was done during the production by the producer to correctly portray the intent of Irving Berlin. Producer of the adaptation Dr. John J. Gallagher stated, "A team of teachers joined me at the Library of Congress in Washington, DC for a research project during the summer of 2017. There, we obtained sheet music, some orchestrations and other personal documents from Berlin himself . . . Local historians had donated authentic photos [and] letters from soldiers that have been incorporated into the production."
