= 152nd Depot Brigade =

Brigade of the United States Army

152d Depot Brigade
- Active: 1917–1919
- Disbanded: May 1919
- Country: United States
- Branch: Army
- Type: Depot
- Role: Receiving and training
- Size: Brigade
- Garrison/HQ: Camp Upton, New York
- Engagements: World War I

The 152d Depot Brigade was a training and receiving formation of the United States Army during World War I. It was successively commanded by Brigadier Generals George W. Read, John E. Woodward, George H. Estes, George D. Moore, Edward Sigerfoos, and William Jones Nicholson.

== History ==
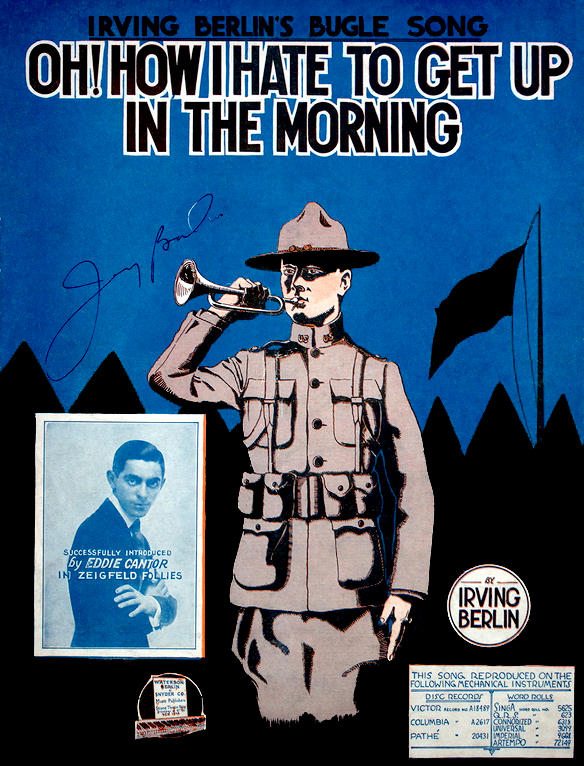
Oh! How I Hate to Get Up in the Morning by Irving Berlin

Secretary of War Newton Baker authorized Major General Franklin Bell to organize the 152d Depot Brigade, an element of the 77th Division. The brigade was later detached and placed directly under Camp Upton, New York, as an independent unit. The depot brigade filled two purposes: one was to act as a receiving unit for men sent to camps by local draft boards; the other was to train replacements for the American Expeditionary Forces.

Irving Berlin wrote the musical revue "Yip Yip Yaphank", including the song "Oh! How I Hate to Get Up in the Morning" while assigned to a unit of the 152d Depot Brigade at Camp Upton in 1918.

== Purpose ==
The role of depot brigades was to receive and organize recruits, provide them with uniforms, equipment and initial military training, and then send them to France to fight on the front lines. The depot brigades also received soldiers returning home at the end of the war and completed their out processing and discharges. Depot brigades were often organized, reorganized, and inactivated as requirements to receive and train troops rose and fell, and later ebbed and flowed during post-war demobilization.

Depot brigades were organized into numbered battalions (1st Battalion, 2d Battalion, etc.), which in turn were organized into numbered companies. The major U.S. depot brigades organized for World War I, which remained active until after post-war demobilization included: 151st (Camp Devens); 152d (Camp Upton); 153d (Camp Dix); 154th (Camp Meade); 155th (Camp Lee); 156th (Camp Jackson); 157th (Camp Gordon); 158th (Camp Sherman); 159th (Camp Taylor); 160th (Camp Custer); 161st (Camp Grant); 162d (Camp Pike); 163d (Camp Dodge); 164th (Camp Funston); 165th (Camp Travis); 166th (Camp Lewis); and 167th (Camp McClellan).

== See also ==
- List of formations of the United States Army during World War I
- Timeline of World War I
- United States home front during World War I
