= Camp Upton =

United States Army installation on Long Island

Coordinates: 40.873346°N 72.872057°W

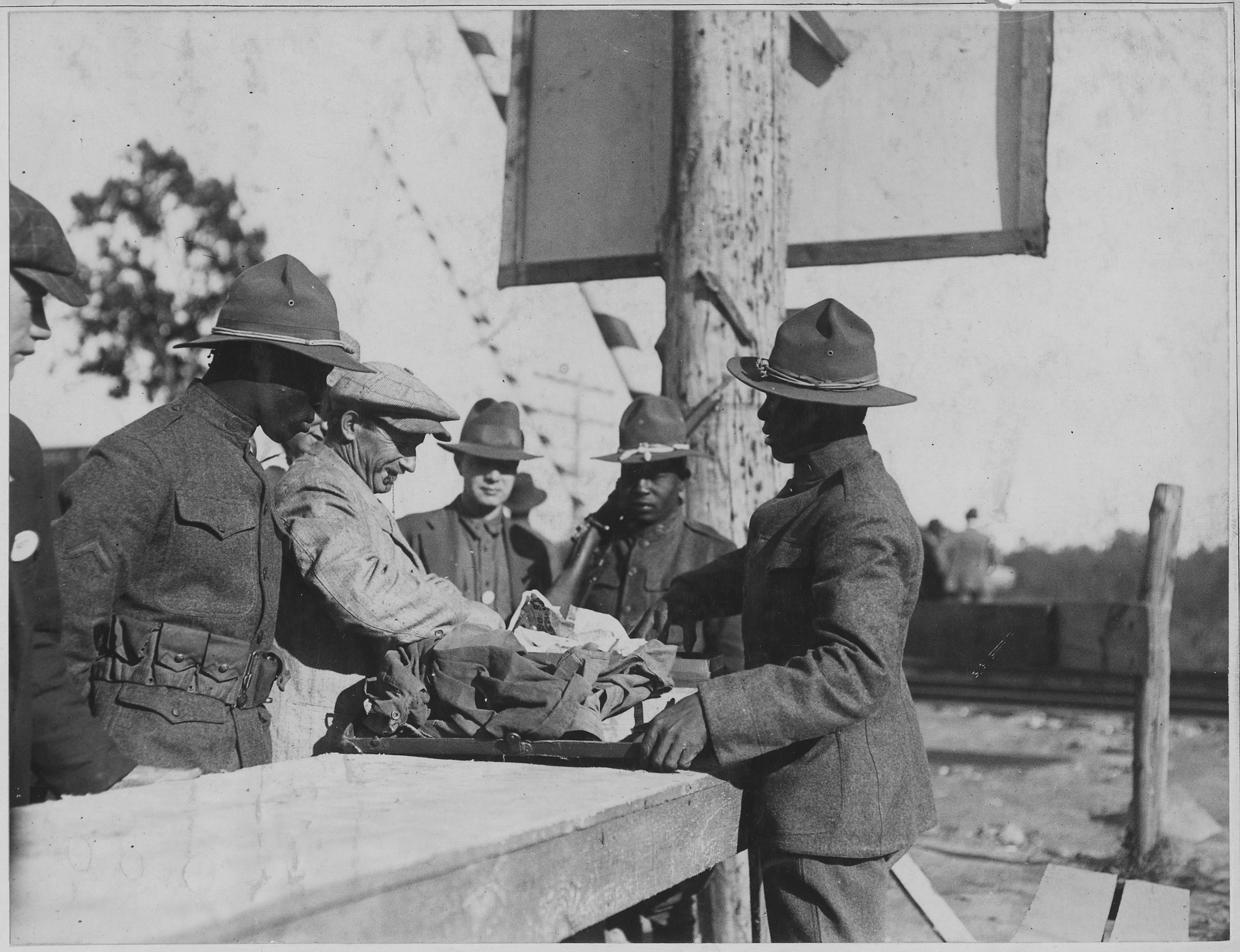
WWI conscripts arrive at Camp Upton.

Camp Upton was a port of embarkation of the United States Army during World War I. During World War II, it was used as an Army induction center, an internment camp for enemy nationals, and a hospital. It was located in Yaphank, New York, in Suffolk County on Long Island, on the present-day location of Brookhaven National Laboratory.

== History ==
=== World War I ===
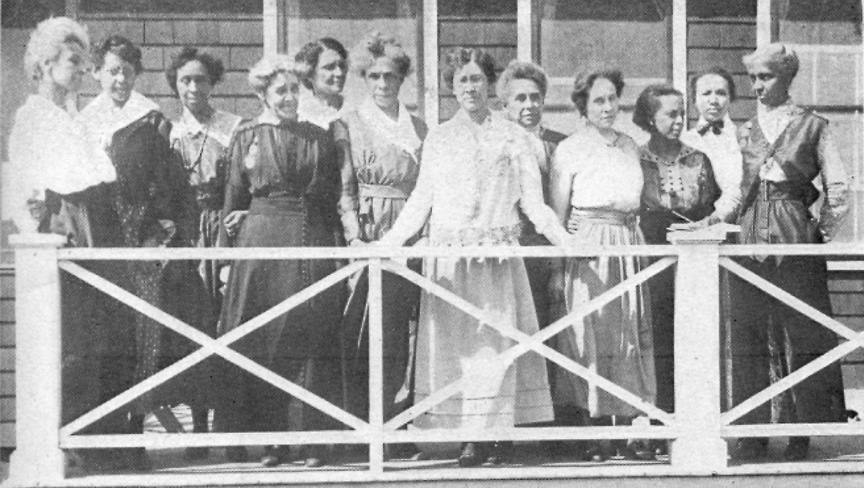
War Workers of the Young Women's Christian Association at Hostess House, Camp Upton, Long Island

Camp Upton, with a capacity of 18,000 troops, was one of three transient embarkation camps directly under the control of the New York Port of Embarkation during World War I. The camp was named after Emory Upton, a Union general of the Civil War. The camp was created in 1917 to house troops as they awaited ships for deployment overseas. However, when the first 20,000 troops arrived at the camp, it was incomplete and worked with the builders to finish the camp. Once the camp was complete, it was placed in Commander Major General J. Franklin Bell's command. Along with housing the troops, the camp also served as a place where they received basic training to be better equipped for combat. General Bell implemented a training program to help with this. The soldiers were trained in tank, trench, and gas warfare by French and British officers, hand-to-hand combat by professional boxers, and how to use machine guns and hand grenades. From Camp Mills, the units traveled by trains of the Long Island Rail Road to board ferryboats for the overseas piers in Brooklyn or Hoboken when scheduled for embarkation aboard troop ships.

The 152nd Depot Brigade was the garrison unit that received new recruits and prepared them for service overseas, and then outprocessed demobilized soldiers at the end of the war. Irving Berlin, the composer, and Alvin York, the most decorated soldier of the American army in World War I, were processed at Camp Upton. The 77th Division was first organized there and would be recognized for their heroism at the Argonne Forest in the Meuse-Argonne Offensive in 1918. During part of the war, the 82nd Division was quartered there.

At the end of World War I, the camp was used to demobilize and inactivate units. Some of the units demobilized at the camp were: the 327th Infantry Regiment, the 325th Infantry Regiment, the 27th Infantry Division's 53rd Brigade (105th, 106th Infantry Regiments and the 105th Machine Gun Battalion), and the 101st Signal Battalion.

In May 1919, Camp Upton became the site of the Recruit Educational Center, an Army program that enrolled foreign-born, non-English speaking, and illiterate soldiers. Most of the Recruit Educational Center's inductees were immigrants from Eastern and Southern Europe. In practice, the program aimed to "Americanize" these immigrants through instruction in the English language, military protocol, U.S. history, geography, citizenship, and political economy. Soldiers who graduated from the Recruit Educational Center at Camp Upton were eligible for a three-year term of military service, after which they could be naturalized as American citizens.

In 1921, the federal government sold the buildings and equipment but kept the land. In 1925, the site was designated as Upton National Forest, but was rescinded in 1927. Many of the structures from the camp were transported to form the first large-scale settlement at Cherry Grove, New York, on Fire Island.

=== World War II ===
Camp Upton was used as an Army induction center in the mobilization of 1940 that preceded the American entry into World War II. Later, it was an internment site for German, Italian, and Japanese nationals who were in New York City or on merchant vessels at the time war broke out. On March 16, 1943, the internees were transferred to Fort George G. Meade in Maryland. In September 1944, Camp Upton became a convalescent and rehabilitation hospital.

=== Brookhaven National Laboratory ===
In 1946, after the camp was closed, the federal government chose the site to build a nuclear research facility that would retain America's preeminence in that field. The former Camp Upton was renamed Brookhaven National Laboratory and was operated by AUI, a consortium of universities, for the United States Atomic Energy Commission.

== In popular culture ==
Irving Berlin, while stationed at Camp Upton, wrote a musical, Yip, Yip, Yaphank, which included the memorable song "Oh! How I Hate to Get Up in the Morning." The musical was turned into a 1943 movie This Is The Army which starred Ronald Reagan.

== See also ==
- Upton, New York
