= Lane departure warning system =

Mechanism designed to warn a driver when the vehicle begins to move out of its lane

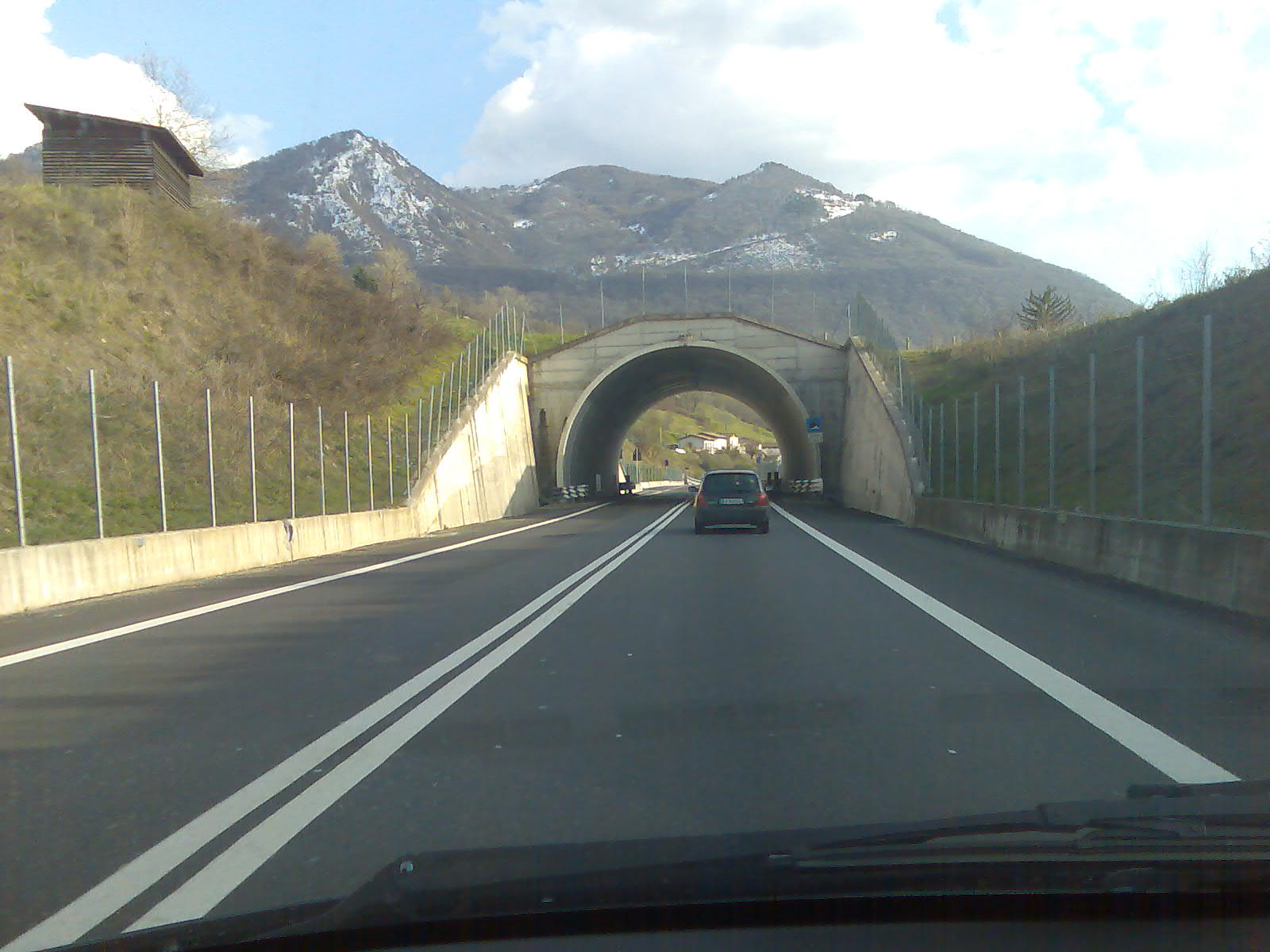
Roadway with lane markings

In road-transport terminology, a lane departure warning system (LDWS) is a mechanism designed to warn the driver when the vehicle begins to move out of its lane (unless a turn signal is on in that direction) on freeways and arterial roads. These systems are designed to minimize accidents by addressing the main causes of collisions: driver error, distractions and drowsiness. In 2009 the U.S. National Highway Traffic Safety Administration (NHTSA) began studying whether to mandate lane departure warning systems and frontal collision warning systems on automobiles.

There are four types of systems:

- Lane departure warning (LDW): Systems which warn the driver if the vehicle is leaving its lane with visual, audible, and/or vibration warnings
- Lane keeping assist (LKA/LKS): Systems which warn the driver and, with no response, automatically take steps to ensure the vehicle stays in its lane
- Lane centering assist (LCA): Systems which assist in oversteering, keeping the car centered in the lane, and asking the driver to take over in challenging situations
- Automated lane keeping systems (ALKS): Designed to follow lane markings with no human driver.

Another system is the emergency lane keeping (ELK). The emergency lane keeping applies correction to a vehicle which drifts beyond a solid lane marking.

== Rationale and method ==
One of the main causes of single vehicle crashes and frontal crashes is lane departure. The goal of the lateral support systems (LSS) is to help to avoid such crashes.

Without those LSS systems, lane departure can be unintentional; the car drifts towards and across the edge of the lane. The car then reach a potentially dangerous situation. This system does not work when the edge of the lane is not marked by a line.

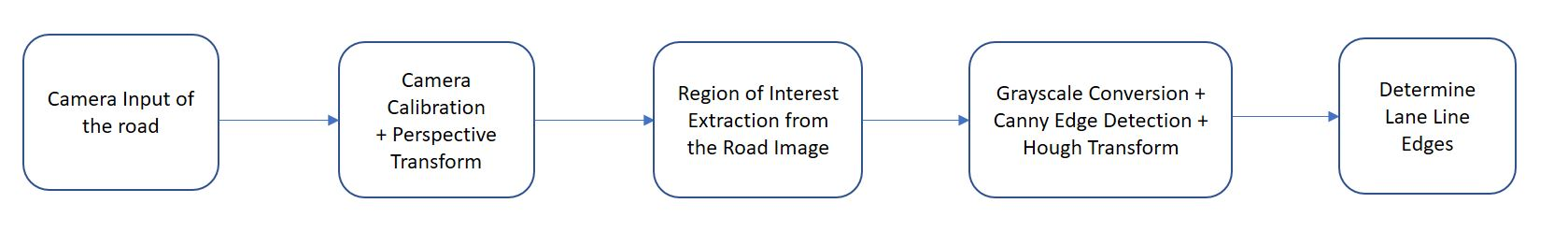
Lane-detection algorithm

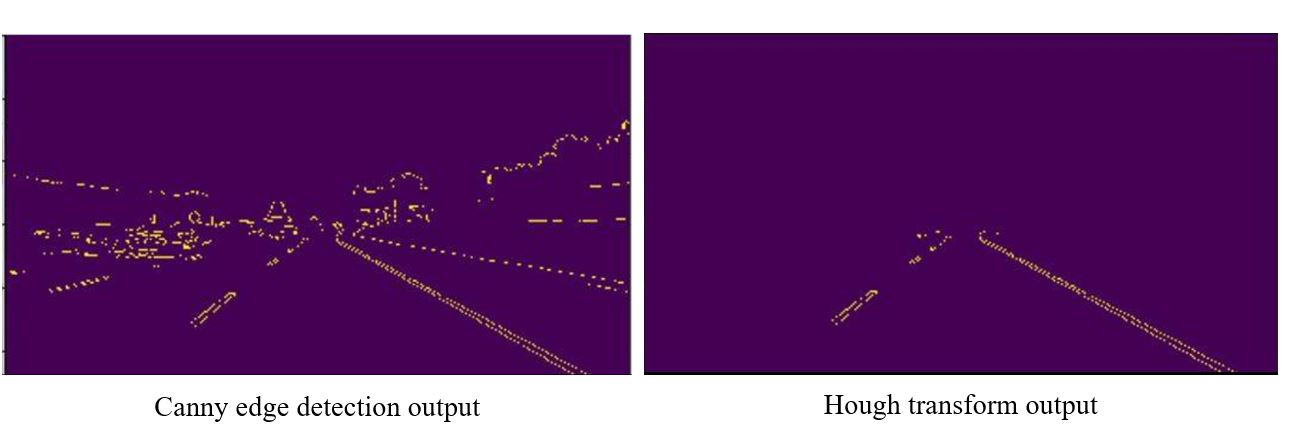
An example implementation of the lane-detection algorithm showing Canny edge detection and Hough transform outputs

A lane detection system used behind the lane departure warning system uses the principle of Hough transform and Canny edge detector to detect lane lines from realtime camera images fed from the front-end camera of the automobile. A basic flowchart of how a lane detection algorithm works to help lane departure warning is shown in the figures.

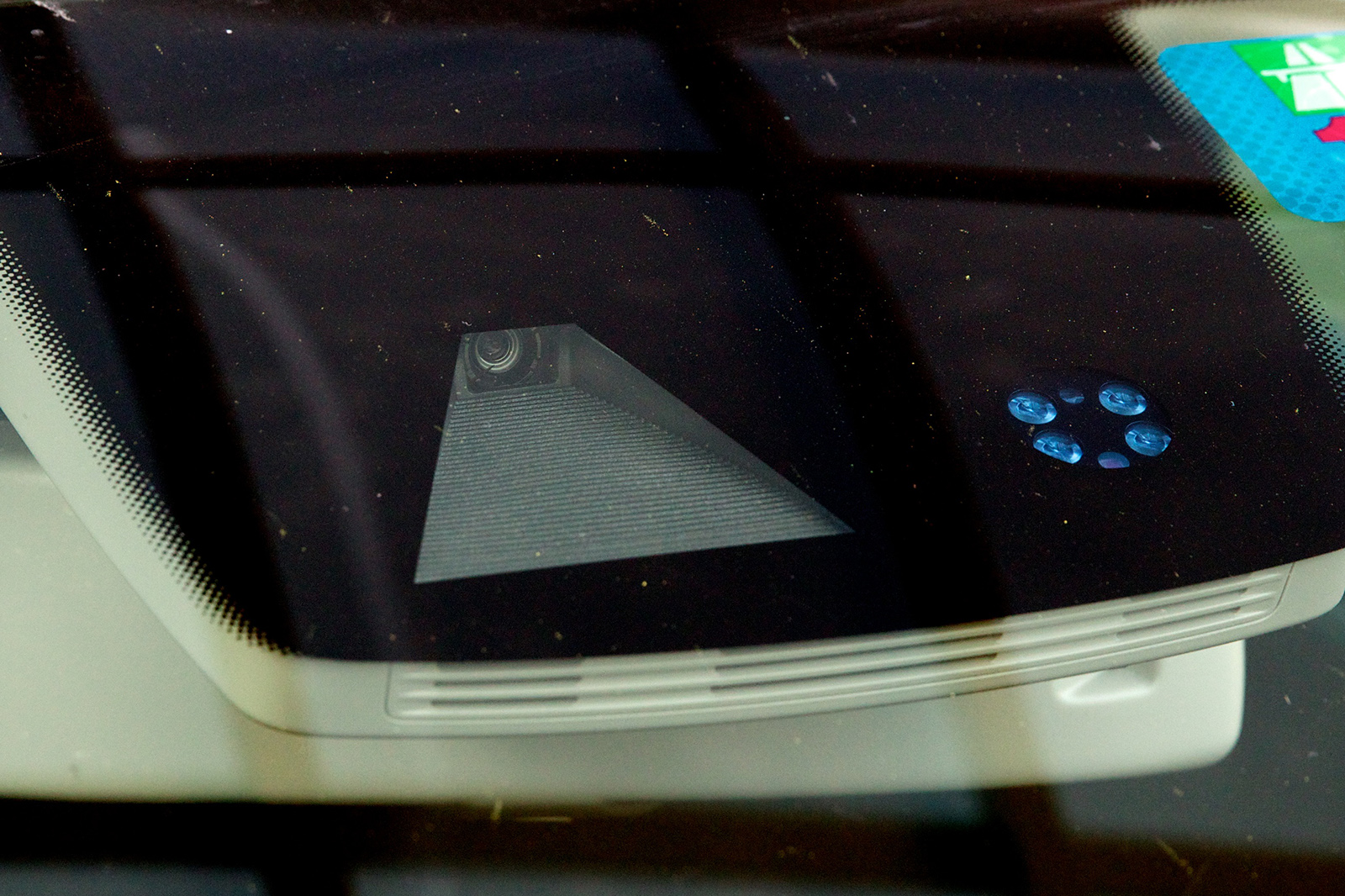
Lane assist camera of VW Golf

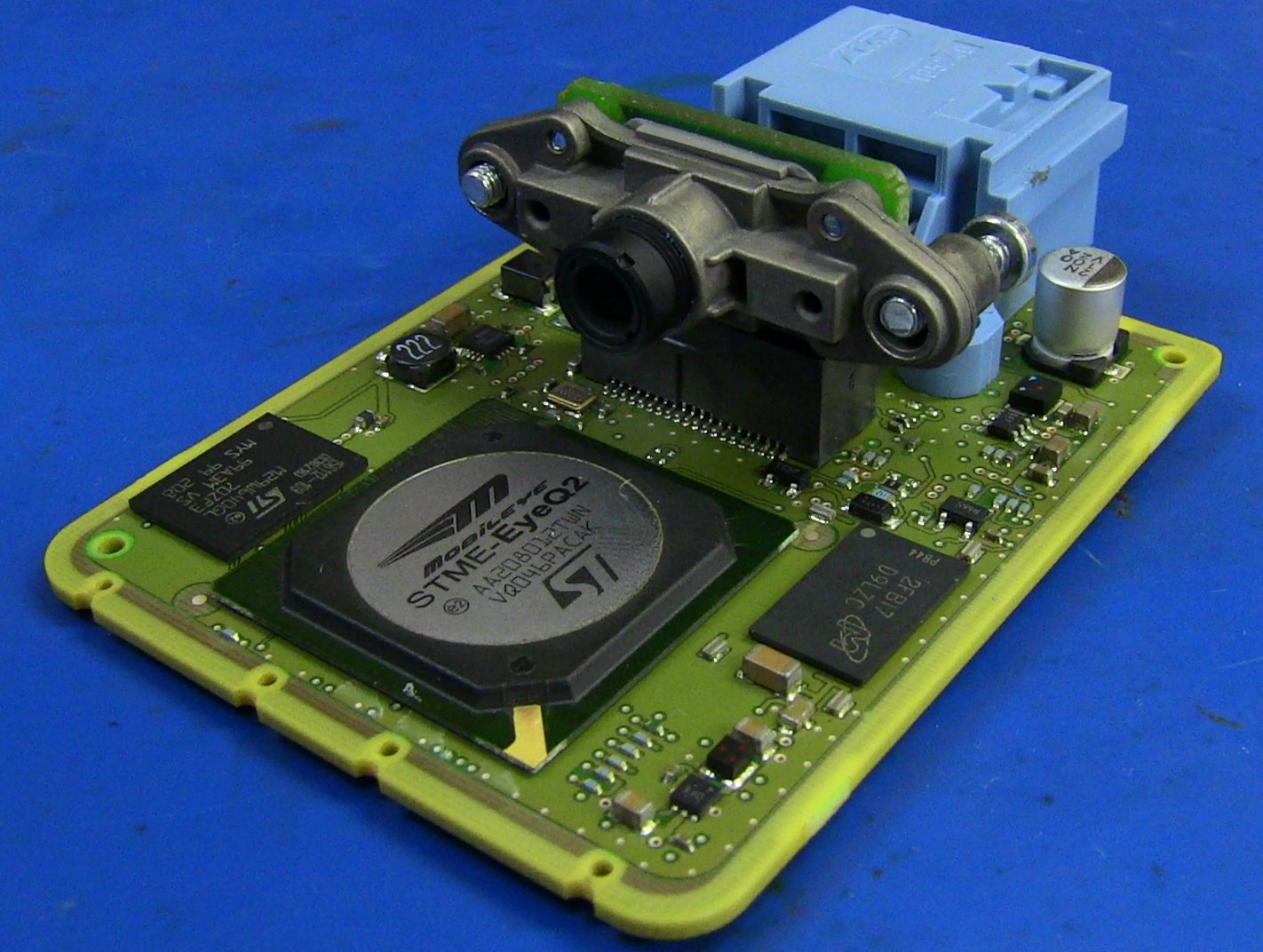
Mobileye's PCB and camera sensor from a Hyundai Lane Guidance camera module

Lane warning/keeping systems are based on:

- Video sensors in the visual domain (mounted behind the windshield, typically integrated beside the rear mirror)
- Laser sensors (mounted on the front of the vehicle)
- Infrared sensors (mounted either behind the windshield or under the vehicle)

In Europe, the lane departure warning system should be compatible with a visible lane marking identification standard such as commission regulation EU-351/2012.

== History ==
The concept and a working model of this technology was invented and fitted to a Rover SD1 in England by British inventor Nick Parish in 1988. Patent application No 8911571.1 was made in 1989.

The first production lane departure warning system in Europe was developed by the United States company Iteris for Mercedes Actros commercial trucks. The system debuted in 2000, and is now available on many new cars, SUVs, and trucks.

In 2002, the Iteris system became available on Freightliner Trucks' North American vehicles. In both these systems, the driver is warned of unintentional lane departures by an audible rumble strip sound generated on the side of the vehicle drifting out of the lane. No warnings are generated if, before crossing the lane, an active turn signal is given by the driver.

=== 2001 ===
Nissan Motors began offering a lane-keeping support system on the Cima 450XV Limited (F500) sold in Japan.

=== 2002 ===
Toyota introduced its lane monitoring system on models such as the Caldina and Alphard sold in Japan; this system warns the driver if it appears the vehicle is beginning to drift out of its lane.

=== 2003 ===
Honda launched its Lane Keep Assist System (LKAS) on the Inspire. It provides up to 80% of steering torque to keep the car in its lane on the highway. It is also designed to make highway driving less cumbersome, by minimizing the driver's steering input. A camera, mounted at the top of the windshield just above the rear-view mirror, scans the road ahead in a 40-degree radius, picking up the dotted white lines used to divide lane boundaries on the highway. The computer recognizes that the driver is "locked into" a particular lane, monitors how sharp a curve is, and uses factors such as yaw and vehicle speed to calculate the steering input required.

=== 2004 ===
In 2004, the first passenger-vehicle system available in North America was jointly developed by Iteris and Valeo for Nissan on the Infiniti FX and (in 2005) the M vehicles. In this system, a camera (mounted in the overhead console above the mirror) monitors the lane markings on a roadway. A warning tone is triggered to alert the driver when the vehicle begins to drift over the markings. Also in 2004, Toyota added a lane keeping assist feature to the Crown Majesta which can apply a small counter-steering force to aid in keeping the vehicle in its lane.

=== 2005 ===
Citroën became the first in Europe to offer LDWS on its 2005 C4 and C5 models, and its C6. This system uses infrared sensors to monitor lane markings on the road surface, and a vibration mechanism in the seat alerts the driver of deviations.

=== 2006 ===
Lexus introduced a multi-mode lane keeping assist system on the LS 460, which utilizes stereo cameras and more sophisticated object- and pattern-recognition processors. This system can issue an audiovisual warning and also (using the electric power steering or EPS) steer the vehicle to hold its lane. It also applies counter-steering torque to help ensure the driver does not over-correct or "saw" the steering wheel while attempting to return the vehicle to its proper lane. If the radar cruise control system is engaged, the Lane Keep function works to help reduce the driver's steering-input burden by providing steering torque; however, the driver must remain active or the system will deactivate.

=== 2007 ===
In 2007, Audi began offering its Audi lane assist feature for the first time on the Q7. This system, unlike the Japanese "assist" systems, will not intervene in actual driving; rather, it will vibrate the steering wheel if the vehicle appears to be exiting its lane. The LDW System in Audi is based on a forward-looking video-camera in its visible range, instead of the downward-looking infrared sensors in the Citroën. Also in 2007, Infiniti offered a newer version of its 2004 system, which it called the Lane Departure Prevention (LDP) system. This feature utilizes the vehicle stability control system to help assist the driver maintain lane position by applying gentle brake pressure on the appropriate wheels.

=== 2008 ===
General Motors introduced Lane Departure Warning on its 2008 model-year Cadillac STS, DTS, and Buick Lucerne models. The General Motors system warns the driver with an audible tone and a warning indicator on the dashboard. BMW also introduced Lane Departure Warning on the 5 Series (E60) and 6 Series, using a vibrating steering wheel to warn the driver of unintended departures. In late 2013 BMW updated the system with Traffic Jam Assistant appearing first on the redesigned BMW X5, this system works below 25 miles per hour (40 km/h). Volvo introduced the lane departure warning system and the driver alert control on its 2008 model-year S80, the V70, and XC70 executive cars. Volvo's lane departure warning system uses a camera to track road markings and sound an alarm when drivers depart their lane without signaling. The systems used by BMW, Volvo, and General Motors are based on core technology from Mobileye.

=== 2009 ===
Mercedes-Benz began offering a Lane Keeping Assist function on the new E-class. This system warns the driver (with a steering-wheel vibration) if it appears the vehicle is beginning to leave its lane. Another feature will automatically deactivate and reactivate if it ascertains the driver is intentionally leaving his lane (for instance, aggressively cornering). A newer version will use the braking system to assist in maintaining the vehicle's lane.

=== 2010 ===
Kia Motors offered the 2011 Cadenza premium sedan with an optional lane departure warning system (LDWS) in limited markets. This system uses a flashing dashboard icon and emits an audible warning when a white lane marking is being crossed, and emits a louder audible warning when a yellow-line marking is crossed. This system is canceled when a turn signal is operating, or by pressing a deactivation switch on the dashboard; it works by using an optical sensor on both sides of the car.

=== 2011 ===
Audi A7 introduces Audi active lane assist.

=== 2012 ===
Mobileye developed a system that detected lane markings, and identified when a vehicle departed from its driving lane without the use of the turn signal.

=== 2013 ===
Mercedes began Distronic Plus with Steering Assist and Stop&Go Pilot on the redesigned S-class in 2013.

=== 2014 ===
Tesla Model S comes with advanced lane assistance systems with their 2014 release. It was also released with a speed assist feature where the front facing camera reads the traffic speed limits using the technology of computer vision character recognition system, and then conveys it to the car. On roads where traffic signs are absent, it relies on the GPS data. When the car moves away from a lane at above 30 miles per hour (48 km/h), the system beeps and the steering wheel vibrate, alerting the driver of an unintended lane change. This happens during speed limit non-compliance as well.

Fiat is launching its lane keep assist feature based on TRW's lane keeping assist system (also known as the haptic lane feedback system). This system integrates the lane-detection camera with TRW's electric power-steering system; when an unintended lane departure is detected (the turn signal is not engaged to indicate the driver's desire to change lanes), the electric power-steering system will introduce a gentle torque that will help guide the driver back toward the center of the lane. Introduced on the Lancia Delta in 2008, this system earned the Italian Automotive Technical Association's Best Automotive Innovation of the Year Award for 2008. Peugeot introduced the same system as Citroën in its new 308.

Lane departure warning systems combine prevention with risk reports in the transportation industry. Viewnyx applies video-based technology to assist fleets in lowering their driving liability costs. By providing safety managers with driver- and fleet-risk assessment reports and tools, it facilitates proactive coaching and training to eliminate high-risk behaviors. The Lookout Solution is used by North American fleets, and there is research on implementing a lane departure warning system via a mobile phone.

=== 2017 ===
An Insurance Institute for Highway Safety raised concern that drivers may be less vigilant when relying on automated safety systems or become distracted by dashboard displays that monitor how the systems are performing.

Two separate studies found that lane-keeping systems and blind spot monitoring systems had lower crash rates than the same vehicles without the systems. Police crash data from 25 states between 2009 and 2015 for vehicle models where the systems were sold as optional reduced rates of single-vehicle, sideswipe, and head-on crashes by 11 percent, and injuries in such crashes by 21 percent. The sample size was not large enough to control for demographic and other variables.

== Lane keeping and next technologies ==
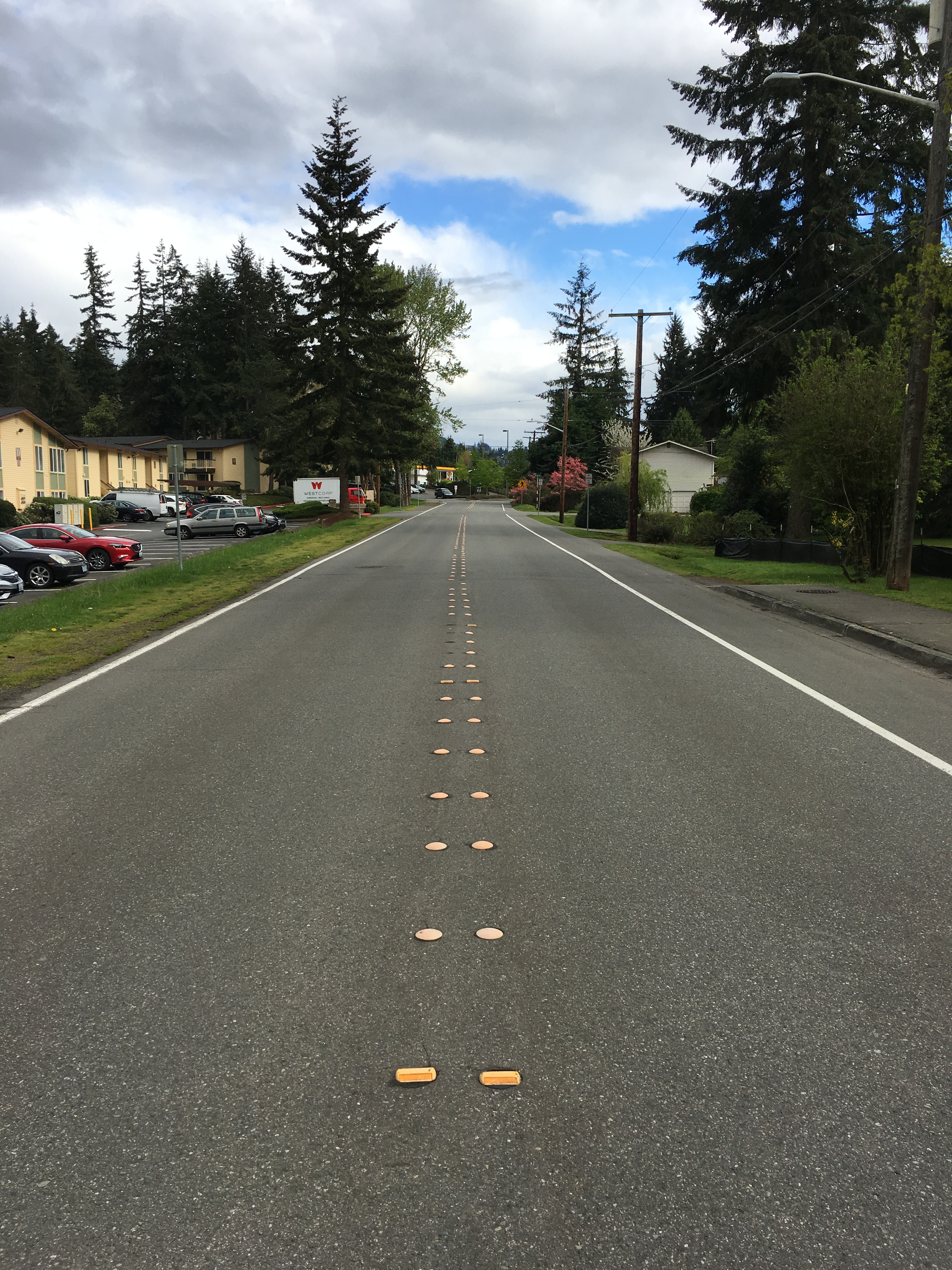
A two-way dotted yellow road lane in the US

Lane keeping assist (LKA) is a feature that, in addition to the lane departure warning system, automatically takes steps to ensure the vehicle stays in its lane. Some vehicles combine adaptive cruise control with lane keeping systems to provide additional safety.

While the combination of these features creates a semi-autonomous vehicle, most require the driver to remain in control of the vehicle while it is in use. This is because of the limitations associated with the lane-keeping feature.

The lane keeping assist system is being achieved in modern vehicle systems using image processing techniques called Hough transform and Canny edge detection techniques. These advanced image processing techniques derive lane data from forward facing cameras attached to the front of the vehicle. Real-time image processing using powerful computers like Nvidia's Drive PX1 are being used by many vehicle OEMs to achieve fully autonomous vehicles in which lane detection algorithm plays a key part. Advanced lane detection algorithms are also being developed using deep learning and neural network techniques. Nvidia has achieved high accuracy in developing self-driving features including lane keeping using the neural network based training mechanism in which they use a front facing camera in a car and run it through a route and then uses the steering input and camera images of the road fed into the neural network and make it 'learn'. The neural network then will be able to change the steering angle based on the lane change on the road and keep the car in the middle of the lane.

A lane keeping assist mechanism can either reactively turn a vehicle back into the lane if it starts to leave or proactively keep the vehicle in the center of the lane. Vehicle companies often use the term "lane keep(ing) assist" to refer to both reactive lane keep assist (LKA) and proactive lane centering assist (LCA) but the terms are beginning to be differentiated.

In 2020, UNECE released an automated lane keeping system (ALKS) regulation which include features such as lane-keeping and adaptative speed for specific roads up to 60 km/h.

=== Vehicles ===
Requires driver control while vehicle is in use, but adjusts steering if vehicle detects itself drifting out of lane ((LKA) refers to reactive "lane keep(ing) assist" and (LCA) refers to proactive lane centering):

Year	Make	Model	Style
2013	Ford	Explorer	
2013	Ford	Fusion	
2013	Lincoln	MKS	
2013	Lincoln	MKZ	
2013	Toyota	Prius	
2014	Acura	RLX	
2014	Acura	MDX	
2014	Ford	Explorer	
2014	Ford	Fusion	
2014	Ford	Taurus	
2014	Infiniti	Q50	LCA
2014	Lincoln	MKS	
2014	Lincoln	MKT	
2014	Lincoln	MKZ	
2014	Mercedes	E-Class	
2014	Mercedes	S-Class	
2014	Toyota	Prius	
2015	Acura	TLX	LCA
2015	Acura	MDX	LCA
2015	Audi	A3	LCA
2015	Audi	A6	LCA
2015	Audi	TT	LCA
2015	Cadillac	ATS	
2015	Chrysler	200	
2015	Chrysler	300	
2015	Dodge	Charger	
2015	Ford	Edge	LKA
2015	Ford	Explorer	LKA
2015	Ford	Galaxy III	
2015	Ford	F-150	LKA
2015	Ford	Fusion	LKA
2015	Ford	Taurus	LKA
2015	Honda	CR-V	LCA
2015	Hyundai	Genesis	LCA
2015	Hyundai	i40	LCA
2015	Lincoln	MKC	LKA
2015	Lincoln	MKS	LKA
2015	Lincoln	MKT	LKA
2015	Lincoln	MKZ	LKA
2015	Mazda	Mazda6	LKA
2015	Mazda	Mazda CX-5	LKA
2015	Mercedes	Sprinter	
2015	Škoda	Octavia III	LKA
2015	Toyota	Prius	
2015	Volvo	XC90 II	LKA

List shows up to 2015 model year. This feature has become more widespread since then, as seen below.

Allows unassisted driving under limited conditions

Year	Make	Model	Features
2014	Tesla	Model S	Part of the Autopilot system released in 2015, retroactively added by software upgrade to hardware capable 2014 vehicles. This combines automatic lane change (after signal is applied), adaptive cruise control, and sign recognition to regulate speed and location.
2014	Infiniti	Q50	Available fly-by-wire (Direct Adaptive Steering) autonomous steering, lane keeping (Lane Assist), (Intelligent Cruise control) adaptive cruise control, and Predictive Forward Collision Warning system
2015	Mercedes	C-Class, E-Class, S-Class	Autonomous steering, lane keeping, adaptive cruise control, parking, and accident avoidance. Semi-autonomous traffic assistant for speeds up to 37 miles per hour (60 km/h).
2015	Tesla	Model S, Model X	This is the Mobileye EyeQ-powered Tesla Autopilot system. This system combines automatic lane change (after signal is applied), adaptive cruise control, and sign recognition to regulate speed and location.
2015	Volkswagen	Passat	Part of the driver assistance pack plus in the new VW Passat B8. It contains a traffic jam assist which is active up to 37 miles per hour (60 km/h). This system steers, brakes, and accelerates. Another part is the emergency assist which takes complete control over the vehicle when the driver does not react anymore. The vehicle is brought autonomously to a complete stop without any driver intervention. Not offered in the North American market Passat.
2015	Volvo	XC90 II	Part of the Pilot Assist system. The system is active up to 31 miles per hour (50 km/h) and steers, brakes, and accelerates the car on its own. It relies on the adaptive cruise control sensing a car in front and clear lane markings to be present.
2016	Audi	Audi A4	Semi-autonomous traffic assistant marketed as "Traffic Jam Assist" offered as an option.
2016	Tesla	Model S, Model X	This is the Mobileye EyeQ3 autopilot system released in 2015. This system combines automatic lane change (after signal is applied), adaptive cruise control, and sign recognition to regulate speed and location.
2016	Volvo	S90 II, V90 II, XC90 II	Part of the Pilot Assist II system. The system is active up to 81 miles per hour (130 km/h) and steers, brakes, and accelerates the car on its own without needing a car which to follow. The driver is required to confirm his presence in regular intervals for the system to stay active.
2017	Tesla	Model S, Model X, Model 3	2017 is the first year of the release of the second generation Autopilot 2 system using the Nvidia Drive PX2 hardware. This combines automatic lane change (after signal is applied), adaptive cruise control, and sign recognition to regulate speed and location and also makes use of 8 cameras, one radar, and several ultrasonic sensors.
2017	Volvo	XC60 II	Part of the Pilot Assist II system.
2018	Volvo	XC40, S60 III, V60 II	Part of the Pilot Assist II system.

== Prevalence ==
Lane keeping assist is mandatory for new cars and vans in the European Union as of 2022 under the name Emergency Lane Keeping System.

== Limitations ==
Lane departure warning systems and lane keeping systems rely on visible lane markings. They typically cannot decipher faded, missing, or incorrect lane markings. Markings covered in snow or old lane markings left visible can hinder the ability of the system.

UNECE regulation 130 does not require LDWS of heavy vehicles to work under 60 km/h or to work in a curve with a radius lower than 250 meters.

Lane departure warning systems also face many legal limitations regarding autonomous driving. As stated previously, this system requires constant driver input. Vehicles with this technology are limited to assisting the driver, not driving the vehicle. Lane departure warning systems biggest limitation is that it is not in complete control of the vehicle. The system does not take into account other vehicles on the road and "cannot replace good driving habits".

== Potential danger ==
American Automobile Association testers found advanced driver assistance systems inconsistent and dangerous. Systems performed 'mostly as expected', but when approaching a simulated disabled vehicle a collision occurred 66 per cent of the time and the average impact speed was 25 mph (40kmh).

== See also ==
- Autonomous car
- Adaptive cruise control
- Blind spot monitor
- Intelligent car
- Lane centering
- Hands-free driving
