= Lane centering =

Mechanism designed to keep a car centered in the lane

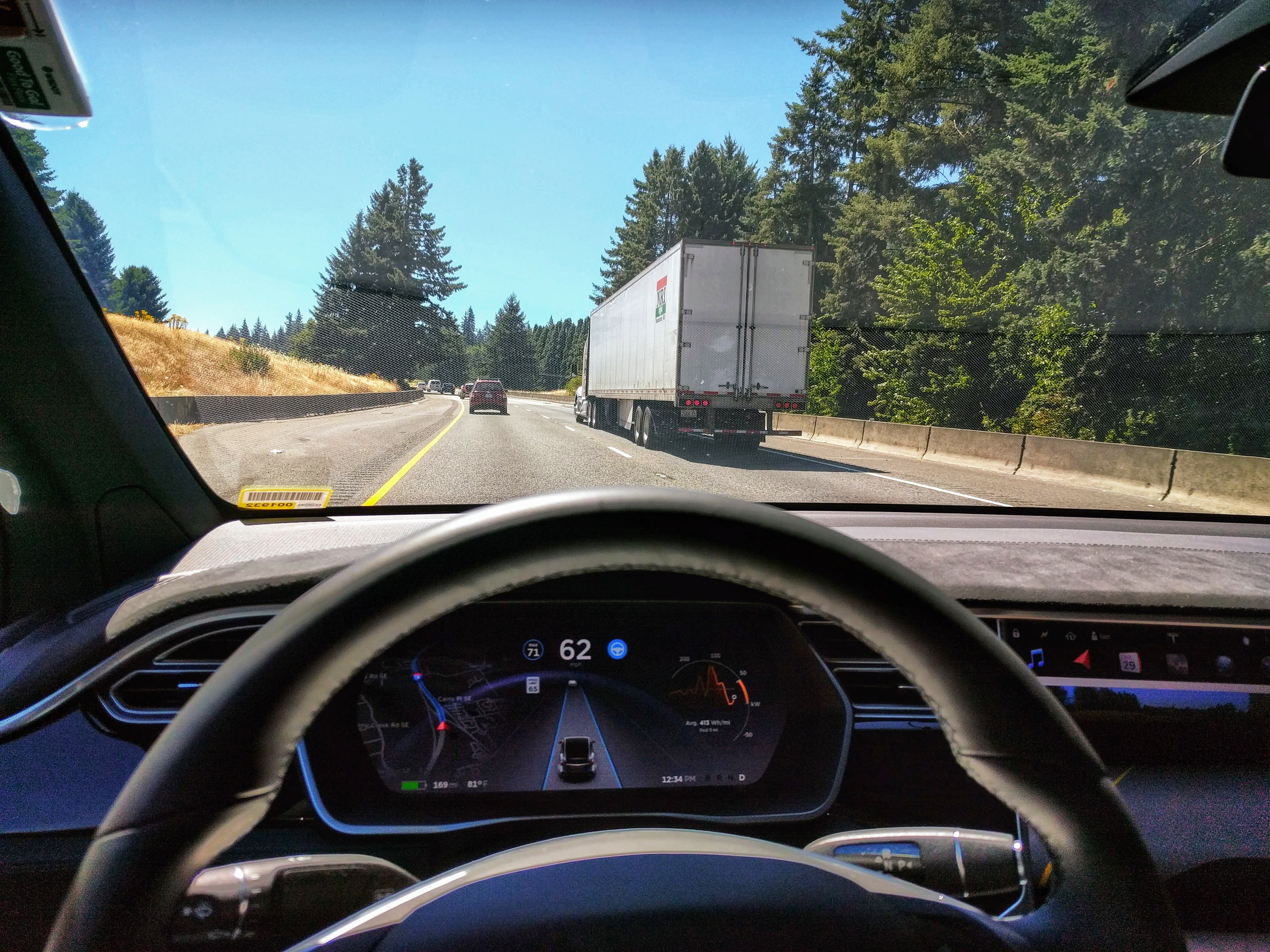
Tesla Autopilot in use

In road-transport terminology, lane centering, also known as lane centering assist, lane assist, auto steer or autosteer, is an advanced driver-assistance system that keeps a road vehicle centered in the lane, relieving the driver of the task of steering. Lane centering is similar to lane departure warning and lane keeping assist, but rather than warning the driver or bouncing the car away from the lane edge, it keeps the car centered in the lane. Together with adaptive cruise control (ACC), this feature may allow unassisted driving for some length of time. It is also part of automated lane keeping systems.

Starting in 2019, semi-trailer trucks have also been fitted with this technology.

== Comparison with other systems ==
Lane centering keeps the vehicle centered in the lane and almost always comes with steering assist to help the vehicle take gentle turns at highway speeds. Lane departure warning generates a warning when the vehicle crosses a line, while lane keeping assist helps the vehicle to avoid crossing a line, standardized in ISO 11270:2014.

In farming, "machine autosteer" is a technology that makes automated steering and positioning of a machine in a landscape.

Comparing standard systems assisting with lateral control
Name	SAE level	Description	ACSF category	Automotive market name
Emergency steering function - ESF	SAE L0 - no driving automation	"automatically detect a potential collision and automatically activate the vehicle steering system for a limited duration, to steer the vehicle with the purpose of avoiding or mitigating a collision." Reg 79		
Lane departure warning - LDW	SAE L0 - no driving automation	warns "the driver of an unintentional drift of the vehicle out of its travel lane." Reg 130. Usually, with lane departure avoidance (LDA)		
Lane departure avoidance - LDA	SAE L0 - no driving automation	"corrects the steering angle to prevent departure from the chosen lane" although (limited duration). Reg 79: Corrective Steering Function (CSF), ACSF B1, Lane Keeping Assistance System (LKA/LKS): ISO 7000-3128; Lane Departure Prevention (LDP)	B1	LKA/LKS
Emergency Lane Keeping System - ELKS	-	combination of LDW and LDA, EU General Safety Regulation [Regulation (EU) 2019/2144] and European Commission Implementing Regulation [Regulation (EU) 2021/64] specification.		
Lane guidance	SAE L1 - assisted driving	adaptive application of some steering to reduce the effort required by the driver in keeping their vehicle centered in the lane.	B1	LKA or Lane Centring Assistance (LCA)
Lane keeping	SAE L2 - partially automated driving	Keep the vehicle in the center of its current lane, reducing driver input	B1	LKA or LCA
Lane change system	SAE L2 - partially automated driving	after initial command or confirmation by the driver, automatically applies steering to move the vehicle to an adjacent lane	C	Auto Lane Change or (Highway/Active) Lane Change Assist

== History ==
The first commercially available lane centering systems were based on off-the-shelf systems created by Mobileye, such as Tesla Autopilot and Nissan ProPilot, although Tesla switched to an in-house design when Mobileye ended their partnership. A handful of companies like Bosch, Delphi, ZF and Mobileye provide sensors, control units, or algorithms to car makers, who then integrate and refine those systems.

While not directly attributable to lane centering, crash rates on the Tesla Model S and Model X equipped with the Mobileye system were reduced by almost 40% while Tesla Autopilot was in use.

== Operation ==
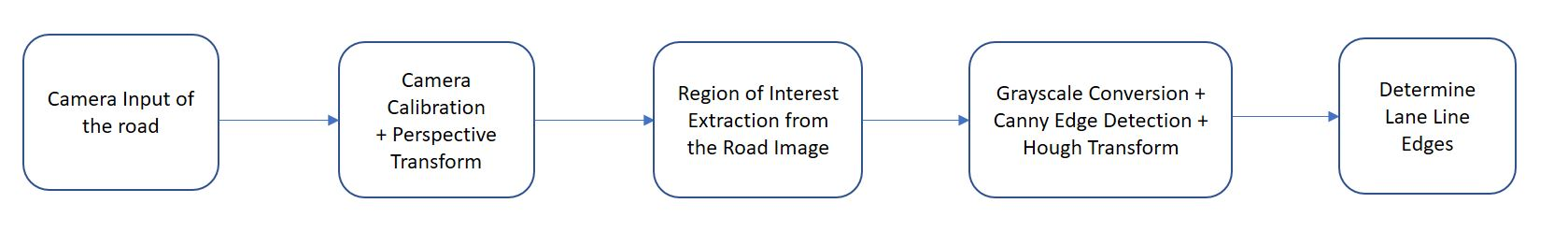
Lane detection algorithm

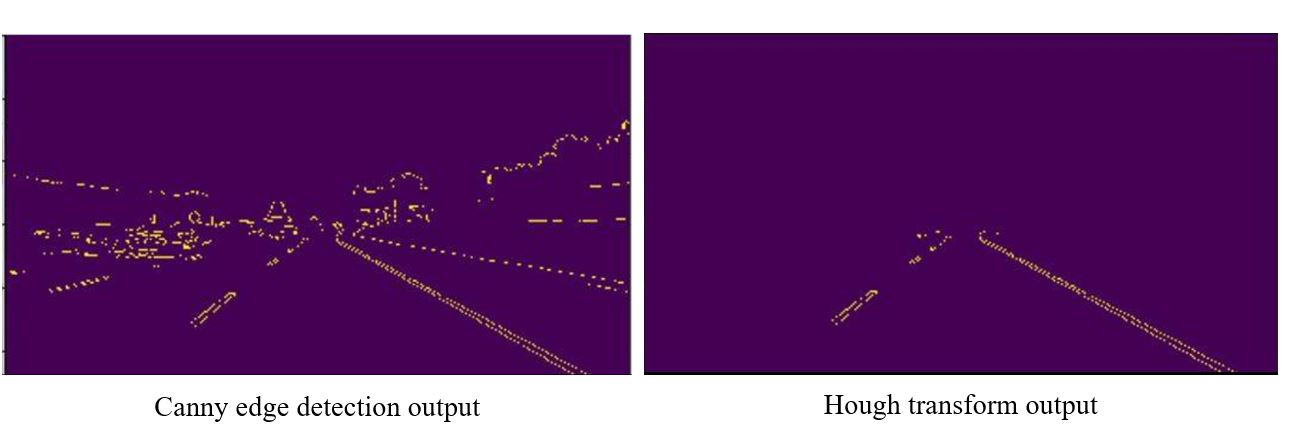
An example implementation of the lane detection algorithm showing Canny edge detection and Hough transform outputs

The lane detection system used by the lane departure warning system uses image processing techniques to detect lane lines from real-time camera images fed from cameras mounted on the automobile. Examples of image processing techniques used include the Hough transform, Canny edge detector, Gabor filter, and deep learning. A basic flowchart of how a lane detection algorithm works to produce lane departure warnings is shown in the figures.

== Limitations ==
Features that differentiate systems include how well they perform on turns, speed limitations, and whether the system resumes from a stop.

Current lane centering systems rely on visible lane markings. They typically cannot decipher faded, missing, incorrect, or overlapping lane markings. Markings covered in snow or obsolete lane markings left visible can affect the accuracy of the system.

GM's Super Cruise only works on known freeways that have been previously mapped, as it uses a combination of these maps and a precise GNSS position provided by Trimble's RTX GNSS correction service to determine if Super Cruise can be enabled or not. Most vehicles require the driver's hands to remain on the wheel, but GM's Super Cruise monitors the driver's eyes to ensure human attention to the road, and thus allows hands-free driving.

== 2018 Mobileye EyeQ4 ==
Mobileye claimed in 2018 that 11 automakers would incorporate their EyeQ4 chip that enables L2+ and L3 autonomous systems; this would collectively represent more than 50% of the auto industry. Level 2 automation is also known as "hands off": this system takes complete control of the vehicle (accelerating, braking, and steering). Level 3 is also known as "eyes off": the driver can safely turn their attention away from driving, e.g. the driver can text or watch a movie.

In 2018, the average selling price for the EyeQ4 chip to automakers was about $450 U.S. dollars.

Nissan uses the EyeQ4 chip for their hands-off ProPilot 2.0 system.

== Regulations ==
In the United States, in 2018, lane centering systems are not covered by any Federal Motor Vehicle Safety Standards, according to the NHTSA.

Territories such as the European Union, Japan, Russia, Turkey, Egypt, and the United Kingdom follow UNECE 79 regulation. In those territories following UNECE 79 regulation, automatically commanded steering functions are classified in several categories, for instance:

- Category A function helps the driver at speed no greater than 10 km/h for parking maneuvering;
- Category B1 function helps the driver to keep the vehicle within the chosen lane;
- Category B2 function "keeps the vehicle within its lane by influencing the lateral movement of the vehicle for extended periods without further driver command/confirmation";
- Category C, D, and E are related to specific manoeuvres such as lane change

While all those functions are related to automated steering, lane centering is a concept close to the concept related to category B2, while LKA is closer to category B1.

Current international regulations require assistance systems to monitor that the driver keeps their hands on the steering wheel, with escalating warnings and eventual disengagement if they fail to do so. In North America, some manufacturers have "hands-off" systems that instead monitor whether the driver is paying attention to the road ahead.

== Examples of Level 2 automated cars ==
Because all of these vehicles also have adaptive cruise control that can work in tandem with lane centering, they meet the SAE standard for Level 2 automation. Adaptive cruise control and lane centering are often only available in more expensive trim levels rather than just the base trim. An example is the Hyundai Kona EV, which only has adaptive cruise control available on the "ultimate" edition.

Examples of vehicles with lane centering ability
Manufact- urer	Sample of vehicles	Branding for lane centering	Notes
Citroën	C4 and ë-C4	lane-keeping assist lane-centring assist	
Daimler Truck	Freightliner Cascadia big-rig Actros	Lane Keep Assist; Active Drive Assist	
Stellantis	Maserati brand		
Ford	2021 F-150 Edge Escape Explorer Focus Mach-E	Ford Co-Pilot360: Lane Centering	
GM	2018 Cadillac CT6, 2021 Cadillac CT4, 2021 Escalade, 2021 Chevrolet Bolt EUV, 2022 Chevy Silverado, GMC Hummer EV	Super Cruise	Only on approved freeways Uses eye tracking system, which does not require the driver to hold the steering wheel.
Honda	Civic, Accord, CR-V, HR-V	Honda Sensing: Traffic Jam Assist (TJA)	Works on speed below 45 mph (72 km/h), automatically switches to Lane Keeping Assist System (LKAS) above the speed.
Honda	Insight Odyssey Pilot	Honda Sensing: Lane Keeping Assist System (LKAS)	Between 45 mph (72 km/h) and 90 mph (140 km/h)
Honda	Acura MDX, Acura TLX, Acura Integra	AcuraWatch: Traffic Jam Assist (TJA)	Works on speed below 45 mph (72 km/h), automatically switches to Lane Keeping Assist System (LKAS) above the speed.
Honda	Acura ILX, Acura RDX	AcuraWatch: Lane Keeping Assist System (LKAS)	Between 45 mph (72 km/h) and 90 mph (140 km/h)
Hyundai	Palisade Kona EV Santa Fe Elantra	Lane Following Assist	Also called Lane Keeping Assist, available at 60 km/h (37 mph) or above.
Kia	Kia Niro EV Kia Telluride Stinger K900 Forte	Lane Following Assist	Speed 0 – 130 km/h, 81 mph
Lincoln	Aviator Corsair Nautilus	Lincoln Co-Pilot360: Lane Centering	
Mazda		Lane Trace	Can be activated at speeds above 60 km/h
Mercedes	A-Class	Driver Assistance Package	
Nissan	Leaf, Rogue Altima	ProPilot Assist	Under 31 mph (50 km/h), ProPilot lane centering will work when tracking another car in the lane.
Subaru	Forester, Outback, Legacy	Subaru Eyesight	Depth perception based on stereo cameras. One of the few systems here, besides Tesla, not based on Mobileye tech.
Tesla	Model S, X, 3, and Y	Autopilot, Autosteer	Works at all speeds other than at certain margins above posted speed limits.
Toyota	Corolla Rav4 Highlander Lexus ES	Lane Tracing Assist	Part of second-generation Toyota Safety Sense
VW	2020 Atlas	Lane Assist	Only works above 37 mph (60 km/h)
VW	Audi A8	2019 Traffic Jam Pilot	Level 3 Autonomy. Germany first. Not for U.S.A. in 2019. Top speed: 37.3 mph, 60 km/h
VW	Audi A6 Porsche Taycan	Tour Assist	Top speed 155 mph (249 km/h)
Volvo	XC40 XC60 XC90	Pilot Assist II	

== Nissan ProPilot ==
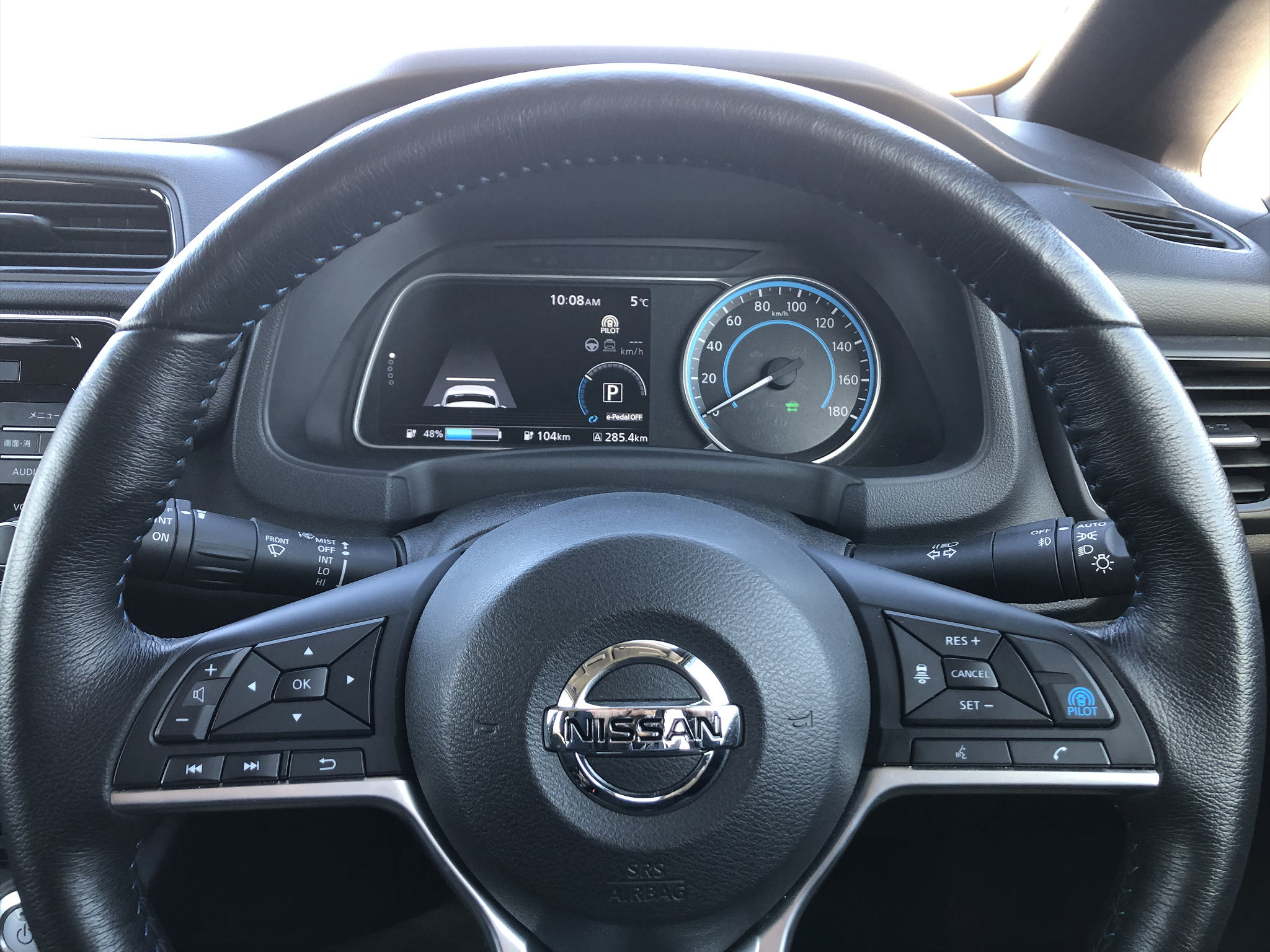
ProPilot in use in a Nissan Leaf

Nissan ProPilot is based on Mobileye technology and assists with acceleration, steering and braking input under single lane highway driving conditions. ProPilot keeps the car centered in the lane and will deactivate below 31 mph if not tracking a vehicle in front of it. Adaptive cruise control handles stop-and-go traffic if stopped for less than 4 seconds and helps maintain a set vehicle speed and maintain a safe distance between the vehicle ahead. ProPilot, which can follow curves, uses a forward-facing camera, forward-facing radar and other sensors. A traffic sign recognition system provides drivers with the most recent speed limit information detected by a camera on the windshield in front of the rear-view mirror.

In a review by ExtremeTech, ProPilot worked well in 1,000 miles of testing, and only on some twisty sections did it require driver intervention. During Euro NCAP 2018 testing, ProPilot failed some tests as did all other systems tested. Consumer Reports indicates that ProPilot is especially helpful in stop and go traffic.

== Honda Sensing/AcuraWatch ==
Honda Sensing and AcuraWatch are a suite of advanced driver assistance features, including Lane Keeping Assist System (LKAS), which helps keep the vehicle centered in a lane by applying mild steering torque if the vehicle is deviating from the center of a detected lane with no turn-signal activation by the driver. The Lane Keeping Assist System (LKAS) does not work at speeds below 45 mph (72 km/h). However, certain vehicles equipped with Traffic Jam Assist (TJA) will have the system take over the lane-keeping task when the speed falls below 45 mph (72 km/h) until a stop. It will automatically switch to Lane Keeping Assist System (LKAS) when the speed exceeds 45 mph (72 km/h).

The Honda Sensing and AcuraWatch packages also include:

- Adaptive cruise control with Low-Speed Follow
- Traffic-sign recognition
- Auto high beam
- Blind Spot Information System

== Evaluation by IIHS ==
In 2018, an evaluation by the American Insurance Institute for Highway Safety found that:

We're not ready to say yet which company has the safest implementation of Level 2 driver assistance, but it's important to note that none of these vehicles is capable of driving safely on its own...

The report also indicated that only the Tesla Model 3 stayed within the lane on all 18 trials, and that while the evidence for safety benefits wasn't as strong as for adaptive cruise control (ACC), it found that preventing lane-departure crashes could save nearly 8,000 lives a year.

== See also ==
- Advanced driver-assistance system
- Hands-free driving
