= ALKS =

ALKS may refer to:

- Alkermes (company), biopharmaceutical company, traded on the NASDAQ as ALKS
- Automated Lane Keeping Systems, automated/autonomous vehicle regulations
