= Collision avoidance system =

Motorcar safety system

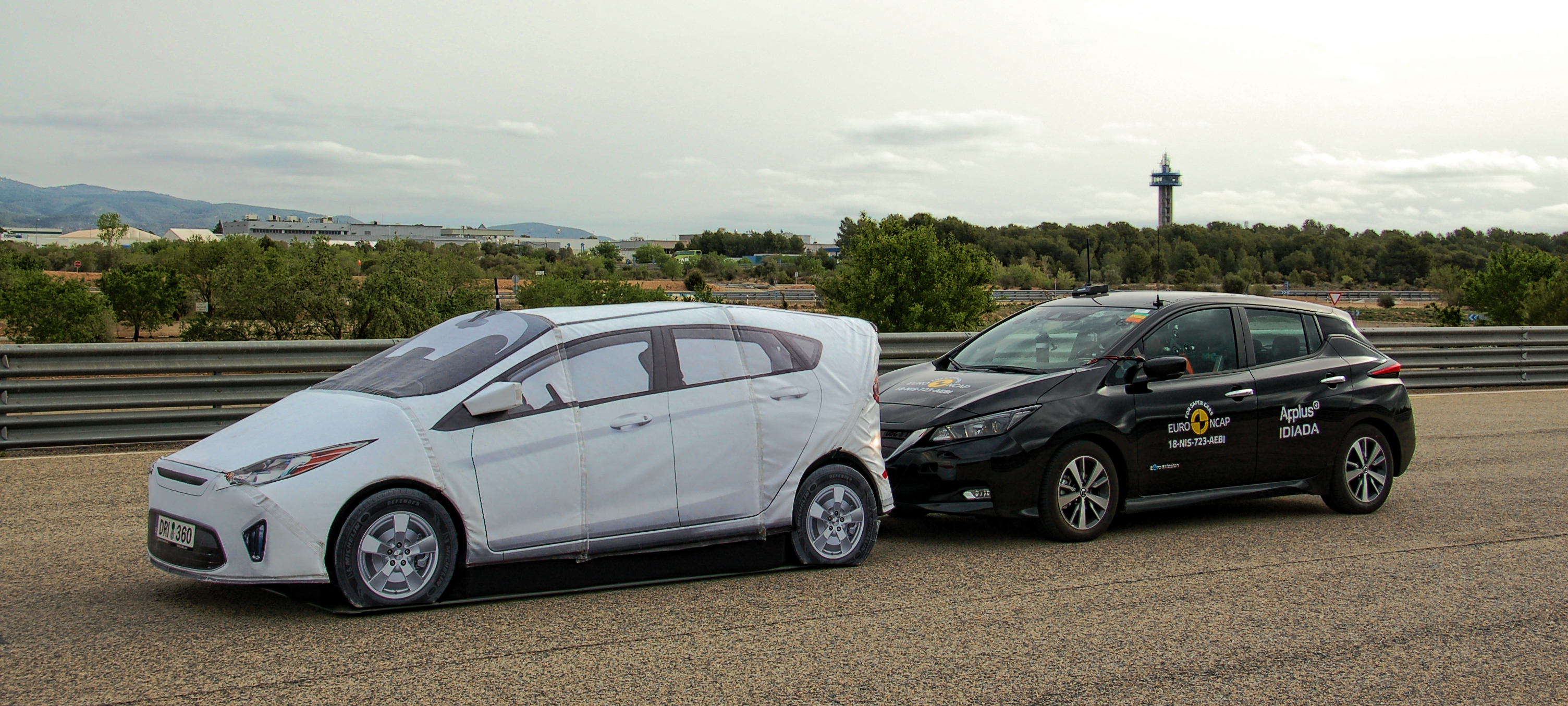
Nissan Leaf approaching a movable target performing an Automated Emergency Braking (AEB) test. The vehicle has AEB Pedestrian, AEB Cyclist, AEB City, and AEB Interurban as standard in 2018.

Schematic of a collision avoidance system

A collision avoidance system (CAS), also known as a pre-crash system, forward collision warning system (FCW), or collision mitigation system, is an advanced driver-assistance system designed to prevent or reduce the severity of a collision. In its basic form, a forward collision warning system monitors a vehicle's speed, the speed of the vehicle in front of it, and the distance between the vehicles, so that it can provide a warning to the driver if the vehicles get too close, potentially helping to avoid a crash. Various technologies and sensors that are used include radar (all-weather) and sometimes laser (LIDAR) and cameras (employing image recognition) to detect an imminent crash. GPS sensors can detect fixed dangers such as approaching stop signs through a location database. Pedestrian detection can also be a feature of these types of systems.

Collision avoidance systems range from widespread systems mandatory in some countries, such as automated emergency braking (AEB) in the EU, agreements between carmakers and safety officials to make crash avoidance systems eventually standard, such as in the United States, to research projects including some manufacturer specific devices.

Similar systems exist in aviation (such as TCAS and ACAS X) and maritime (such as MCAS).

== Advanced emergency braking system (AEBS) ==
The World Forum for Harmonization of Vehicle Regulations defines AEBS (also automated emergency braking in some jurisdictions). UN ECE Regulation 131 requires a system that can automatically detect a potential forward collision and activate the vehicle braking system to decelerate a vehicle to avoid or mitigate a collision. UN ECE regulation 152 says deceleration can be 5 meters per second squared.

Once an impending collision is detected, these systems provide a warning to the driver. When the collision becomes imminent, they can take action autonomously without any driver input (by braking or steering or both). Collision avoidance by braking is appropriate at low vehicle speeds (e.g. below 50 km/h (31 mph)), while collision avoidance by steering may be more appropriate at higher vehicle speeds if lanes are clear. Cars with collision avoidance may also be equipped with adaptive cruise control, using the same forward-looking sensors.

AEB differs from forward collision warning: FCW alerts the driver with a warning but does not by itself brake the vehicle.

According to Euro NCAP, AEB has three characteristics:

- Autonomous: the system acts independently of the driver to avoid or mitigate the accident.
- Emergency: the system will intervene only in a critical situation.
- Braking: the system tries to avoid the accident by applying the brakes.

Time-to-collision could be a way to choose which avoidance method (braking or steering) is most appropriate.

A collision avoidance system by steering is a new concept. It is considered by some research projects. Collision avoidance system by steering has some limitations: over-dependence on lane markings, sensor limitations, and interaction between driver and system.

== Emergency steering function ==
The emergency steering function, known as ESF, is an automated steering function that detects a potential collision and automatically activates the steering system for a limited duration to avoid or mitigate a collision.

The emergency steering function for UNECE countries is described by regulation 79.

== Automated lane keeping Systems ==
Automated lane keeping systems (ALKS) deal with avoiding some cases of collisions.

ALKS defines some concepts:

Imminent collision risk describes a situation or an event which leads to a collision of the vehicle with another road user or an obstacle which cannot be avoided by a braking demand with lower than 5 m/s

— Uniform provisions concerning the approval of vehicles about automated lane-keeping systems

Emergency Manoeuvre (EM) is a maneuver performed by the system in case of an event in which the vehicle is at imminent collision risk and has the purpose of avoiding or mitigating a collision.

— Uniform provisions concerning the approval of vehicles about automated lane-keeping systems

The activated system shall not cause any collisions that are reasonably foreseeable and preventable. If a collision can be safely avoided without causing another one, it shall be avoided. When the vehicle is involved in a detectable collision, the vehicle shall be brought to a standstill.

— Uniform provisions concerning the approval of vehicles concerning automated lane-keeping systems

The activated system shall detect the distance to the next vehicle in front as defined in paragraph 7.1.1. and shall adapt the vehicle speed to avoid collision.

— Uniform provisions concerning the approval of vehicles about automated lane-keeping systems

The activated system shall be able to bring the vehicle to a complete stop behind a stationary vehicle, a stationary road user, or a blocked lane of travel to avoid a collision. This shall be ensured up to the maximum operational speed of the system.

— Uniform provisions concerning the approval of vehicles concerning automated lane-keeping systems

The activated system shall avoid a collision with a leading vehicle (...)

The activated system shall avoid a collision with a cutting in the vehicle (...)

The activated system shall avoid a collision with an unobstructed crossing pedestrian in front of the vehicle.

— Uniform provisions concerning the approval of vehicles concerning automated lane-keeping systems

This document clarifies the derivation process to define conditions under which automated lane-keeping systems (ALKS) shall avoid a collision

— Uniform provisions concerning the approval of vehicles about automated lane-keeping systems, Guidance on traffic disturbance critical scenarios for ALKS

== Regulations ==
AEB and ALKS are each defined by one or several UN-ECE regulations.

Requirements related to AEB are regulations 131 and 152.

Regulation 157 is related to ALKS.

Japan has required AEB since 2020 and ALKS since 2021. The European Union requires AEB since 2022 but has not defined a date for ALKS.

== Automobile manufacturers ==
Various vendors provide AEB components to automakers. The global automotive AEB system market consists of a few established companies that are manufacturers or suppliers of specialized AEB components or systems. For example, the main vendors for radar systems include Bosch, Delphi, Denso, Mobileye, TRW, and Continental. Automobile manufactures may describe the systems installed on their vehicles using different names to differentiate their marketing efforts. A particular automaker may have systems and sensors sourced from a variety of suppliers. Therefore, even a single car brand may offer various levels of technology sophistication and the: frequency of false alerts can be different from model to model and trim level to trim level, depending on the types of camera and/or laser-based systems installed.

In countries, such as the UK, one-quarter of new vehicles might have some kind of AEB system; but only 1% of previously sold cars might have AEB.

=== Audi ===
"Pre sense" autonomous emergency braking system uses twin radar and monocular camera sensors and was introduced in 2010 on the 2011 Audi A8. "Pre sense plus" works in four phases. The system first provides warning of an impending accident, activating hazard warning lights, closing windows and sunroof, and pre-tensioning front seat belts. The warning is followed by light braking to get the driver's attention. The third phase initiates autonomous partial braking at a rate of 3 m/s^{2} (9.8 ft/s^{2}). The fourth phase increases braking to 5 m/s^{2} (16.4 ft/s^{2}) followed by automatic full braking power, roughly half a second before projected impact. "Pre sense rear", is designed to reduce the consequences of rear-end collisions. The sunroof and windows are closed and seat belts are prepared for impact. The seats are moved forward to protect the car's occupants. 2015 introduced the "avoidance assistant" system that intervenes in the steering to help the driver avoid an obstacle. If an accident occurs, the "turning assistant" monitors opposing traffic when turning left at low speeds. In critical situations, it stops the car. "Multi collision brake assist" uses controlled braking maneuvers during the accident to aid the driver. Both systems were introduced on the Second generation Q7.

=== BMW ===
In 2012 BMW introduced two systems on the 7 Series. "Active Protection" detects imminent accidents by pretensioning safety belts, closes windows and moonroof, brings the backrest of the front passenger seat to an upright position, and activates post-crash braking. A driver drowsiness detection includes advice to take a break from driving. An "Active Driving Assistant" combines lane departure warning, pedestrian protection, and city collision mitigation.

In 2013, "Driving Assistant Plus" was introduced on most models combining the front-facing camera, lane-departure warning, and in some cases front radar sensors to detect vehicles ahead. Should the driver not react to the warning of a potential collision, the system would gradually prime brake pressure and apply – with maximum deceleration power – if necessary. In the case of a crash, the system can bring the vehicle to a standstill. Later iterations of the system on cars equipped with an Automatic Cruise Control system are improved by combining radar and camera detection during fog, rain, and other situations where normal camera operations may be compromised.

=== Ford ===
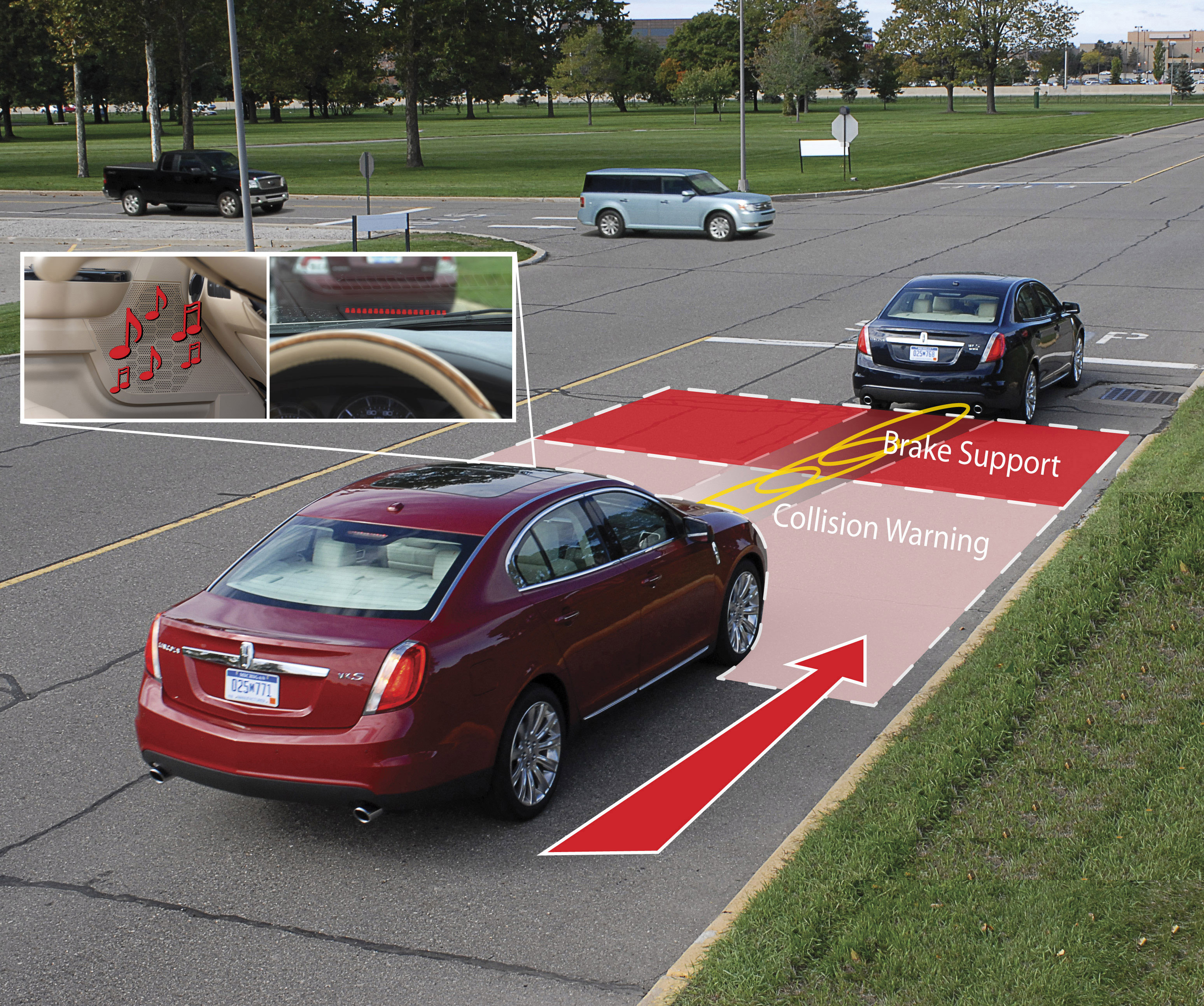
Collision warning and brake support on the 2009 Lincoln MKS

Beginning on the 2012 Ford Focus, Active City Stop was offered on the range-topping Titanium model, under the optional Sports Executive Pack. The system used windscreen-mounted lidar to monitor the road ahead. The Active City Stop system doesn't provide a warning, but when optioned with adaptive cruise control, Forward Alert can provide pre-collision assist. It can prevent a crash from occurring at speeds between 3.6 and 30 km/h (2.2 and 18.6 mph). This speed was later raised to 50 km/h (31 mph) on LZ series from 2015. It was optional in the Technology Pack on Trend, Sport, and ST, and standard on Titanium, and RS Limited Edition.

=== General Motors ===
General Motors' collision alert system was introduced in GMC Terrain SUVs in 2012. It uses a camera to provide a warning when there is a vehicle ahead or there is a lane departure. The 2014 Chevrolet Impala received the radar- and camera-based crash imminent braking (radar technology detects a possible crash threat and alerts the driver. If the driver does not appear to react quickly enough or doesn't react at all, this feature intervenes to apply the brakes to avoid the crash. Forward collision alert, lane departure warning, side blind zone alert (using radar sensors on both sides of the vehicle, the system "looks" for other vehicles in the blind zone areas of the Impala and indicates their presence with LED-lit symbols in the outside mirrors. Rear cross-traffic alert features.

=== Honda ===
2003: Honda introduced autonomous braking (Collision Mitigation Brake System CMBS, originally CMS) front collision avoidance system on the Inspire and later in Acura, using a radar-based system to monitor the situation ahead and provide brake assistance if the driver reacts with insufficient force on the brake pedal after a warning in the instrument cluster and a tightening of the seat belts. The Honda system was the first production system to provide automatic braking.

The system also incorporated an "E-Pretensioner", which worked in conjunction with the CMBS system with electric motors on the seat belts. When activated, the CMBS has three warning stages. The first warning stage includes audible and visual warnings to brake. If ignored, the second stage would include the E-Pretensioner's tugging on the shoulder portion of the seat belt two to three times as an additional tactile warning to the driver to take action. The third stage, in which the CMBS predicts that a collision is unavoidable, includes full seat belt slack take-up by the E-Pretensioner for more effective seat belt protection and automatic application of the brakes to lessen the severity of the predicted crash. The E-Pretensioner would also work to reduce seat belt slack whenever the brakes are applied, and the brake assist system is activated.

2013: Honda introduced new driver-assistance system called Honda SENSING in 2014 Honda Legend, with the tagline, "Safety for Everyone". The system uses two types of sensors: a millimeter-wave radar in the front grille and a monocular camera on the windshield. These sensors detect pedestrians and other objects with improved accuracy. Enhanced data processing capabilities allow the system to recognize surroundings, driver intentions, and vehicle conditions, enabling collaborative control over braking and steering. The system now includes six new functions, such as the Pedestrian Collision Mitigation Steering System, and assists in vehicle speed, following distance, and lane keeping. Honda continues to evolve its driver-assistive technologies globally to enhance safety and comfort.

2020: Honda announced the flagship variation of Honda SENSING called, Honda SENSING Elite. The system was first introduced in the new Honda Legend Hybrid EX. This system uses 3D maps, GNSS data, and sensors to monitor the vehicle's surroundings and driver condition. It can control acceleration, braking, and steering for smooth driving and includes features like hands-off lane change assist and Traffic Jam Pilot for Level 3 automated driving, approved by Japan's Ministry of Land, Infrastructure, Transport, and Tourism (MLIT).

A key feature of Honda SENSING Elite is the hands-off function, which assists in steering the vehicle when the driver has their hands off the wheel, supported by adaptive in-lane driving. This aids in maintaining lane position at a pre-set speed and keeping a proper following distance from the vehicle ahead. The system also includes active lane change assist with hands-off function, which executes lane changes when the driver activates the turn signal and adjusts the vehicle's speed accordingly.

2021: Honda introduced the Honda SENSING 360 system, enhancing the original with omnidirectional sensing. This system helps eliminate blind spots and reduce collisions by using five millimeter-wave radar units and a front camera. Key features include Front Cross Traffic Warning, which alerts drivers to approaching vehicles at intersections; Lane Change Collision Mitigation, which helps avoid collisions during lane changes; and Collision Mitigation Braking, which provides braking assistance at turns. It also features Adaptive Cruise Control with Cornering Speed Assist, adjusting speed during cornering for smoother navigation. The application of Honda SENSING 360 will begin in 2022, starting from China, with the first vehicle equipped with Honda SENSING 360 being the eleventh-generation Honda Accord and sixth-generation Honda CR-V.

2022: Honda updated the SENSING 360 system with new features including Advanced Lane Driving and Lane Change Assist with hands-off capability, a Driver Emergency Support System, and Exit Warning. These additions enhance existing features like collision mitigation braking and front cross traffic warning.

2023: Honda SENSING 360+ builds on existing Honda SENSING 360 by adding a driver monitoring camera and high-definition maps. This updated system aims to reduce accidents caused by driver health issues or errors. It features Advanced Lane Driving with hands-off capability, Active Lane Change Recommendation, Predictive Curve Departure Warning, and an Exit Warning. The system will debut with the Accord in China in 2024 and expand globally. It includes a Driver Emergency Support System that helps stop the vehicle if the driver becomes unresponsive and connects to the HELPNET® emergency call center for added safety.

=== Jaguar Land Rover ===
As part of the InControl suite of services, Jaguar Land Rover provides several driver assistance technologies, amongst which are autonomous emergency braking, intelligent emergency braking, lane departure warning, blind spot monitor and blind spot assist. The systems variously use both microwave and optical detection methods.

=== Mercedes-Benz ===
2002: Mercedes' "Pre-Safe" system was exhibited at the Paris Motor Show on the 2003 S-Class. Using electronic stability control sensors to measure steering angle, vehicle yaw, and lateral acceleration and brake assist (BAS) sensors to detect emergency braking, the system can tighten the seat belts, adjust seat positions, including rear seats (if installed), raise folded rear headrests (if installed), and close the sunroof if it detects a possible collision (including rollover). A later version of the Pre-Safe system was supplemented by an additional function that can close any open windows if necessary.

2006: Mercedes-Benz's "Brake Assist BAS Plus" was their first forward warning collision system introduced on the W221 S-Class, it incorporates the autonomous cruise control system and adds a radar-based collision warning.

2006: the "Pre-Safe Brake" on the CL-Class C216 was their first to offer partial autonomous braking (40%, or up to 0.4g deceleration) if the driver does not react to the BAS Plus warnings and the system detects a severe danger of an accident.

2009: Mercedes introduced the first Pre-Safe Brake with full (100%) autonomous braking with maximum braking force approximately 0.6 seconds before impact, on the Mercedes-Benz E-Class (W212).

2013: Mercedes updated Pre-Safe on the W222 S-Class as plus with cross-traffic assist. Pre-Safe with pedestrian detection and City Brake function is a combination of stereo camera and radar sensors to detect pedestrians in front of the vehicle. Visual and acoustic warnings are triggered when a hazard is spotted. If the driver then reacts by braking, the braking power will be boosted as the situation requires, up to a full brake application. Should the driver fail to react, the Pre-Safe Brake triggers autonomous vehicle braking. Pedestrian detection is active up to about 72 km/h (45 mph), and can reduce collisions with pedestrians autonomously from an initial speed of up to 50 km/h (31 mph). A radar sensor in the rear bumper monitors the traffic behind the vehicle. If the risk of an impact from the rear is detected, the rear hazard warning lights are activated to alert the driver of the vehicle behind (not on vehicles with USA/Canada coding). Anticipatory occupant protection measures, such as the reversible belt tensioners, are deployed. If the vehicle is stopped and the driver indicates a wish to remain stationary – by depressing the brake pedal, activating the hold function, or moving the selector lever to "P" – the system increases the brake pressure to keep the vehicle firmly braked during a possible rear-end collision. Pre-Safe Impulse works an early phase of the crash, before the resulting deceleration starts to increase, the front occupants are pulled away from the direction of impact and deeper into their seats by their seat belts. By the time the accident enters the phase when loads peak, the extra distance they are retracted by can be used while dissipating energy in a controlled fashion. Pre-acceleration and force limitation allow the occupants to be temporarily isolated from the effects of the crash, significantly reducing the risk and severity of injuries in a frontal collision.

=== Nissan ===
Nissan's Infiniti brand offers both laser-based and radar-based systems. Brake assist with preview function anticipates the need to apply emergency braking and pre-pressurize the brake system to help improve brake response. Intelligent brake assist (IBA) with forwarding emergency braking (FEB) (on QX80) uses radar to monitor the approaching speed of the vehicle ahead, helping detect an imminent collision. It provides a two-stage warning to alert the driver, and if the driver takes no action, the system automatically engages the brakes to mitigate the collision speed and impact. A predictive forward collision warning system warns the driver of risks that may be obscured from the driver's view. It senses the relative velocity and distance of a vehicle directly ahead, as well as a vehicle traveling in front of the preceding one. The forward emergency braking system judges that deceleration is required, it alerts the driver using both a screen display and sound, then generates a force that pushes the accelerator pedal up and applies partial braking to assist the driver in slowing the vehicle down. When the system judges that there is the possibility of a collision, it will automatically apply harder braking to help avoid one.

Nissan has been under investigation for collision avoidance systems on late-model Rogue models that allegedly brake the vehicles for no reason, according to the US National Highway Traffic Safety Administration (NHTSA). As of September 2019, Nissan considered the issue strictly as a "performance update" by issuing technical service bulletins—at least three since January 2019—that pertain to reprogramming the radar control unit, according to the agency. At least 553,860 cars are potentially affected from the 2017 and 2018 model years.

=== Subaru ===
Subaru's "Active Driving Assist" (ADA) system was introduced in 1999 on the Japanese Legacy Lancaster and consisted of a stereo camera system featuring lane departure warning, following distance warning, adaptive cruise control, and a cornering speed alarm with downshift control. A second generation was released in 2001 that included VDC parameter control, followed by a third in 2003 that included a millimeter-wave radar for improved performance in poor weather. This system was discontinued due to poor sales, and was replaced in 2006 by a laser radar system dubbed "SI-Cruise" which used laser radar for adaptive cruise control.

In May 2008, Subaru launched the rebranded system "EyeSight" on Japanese-market Legacy models claiming to be the company's "first advanced driver assistance system," and featuring only stereo cameras and expanded functionality over its predecessor technology. As initially announced, EyeSight enabled pre-collision braking control and adaptive cruise control at all speeds. It was rolled out in Australia in 2011, in North America in 2012, and in Europe in 2014.

The pre-collision braking control was upgraded in 2010 to allow the vehicle to stop automatically if the speed difference between the EyeSight-equipped vehicle and the object in front is less than 30 km/h (19 mph) and the driver takes no action to slow down or stop. Above 30 km/h (19 mph), the vehicle will reduce its speed automatically. It also allows the vehicle to engage braking assist, if there is a risk of a frontal collision and the driver suddenly applies the brakes. The speed difference to allow an automatic stop was raised to 50 km/h (31 mph) in 2013 with improved cameras. The adaptive cruise control was also upgraded in 2010 to allow automatic emergency braking in traffic, fully stopping the EyeSight vehicle when the car in front has come to a complete stop.

In 2013, color was added to the cameras, allowing the system to recognize brake lights and red stoplights ahead. Subaru also added active lane-keeping (keeping the vehicle in the middle of the lane, and applying steering force to keep the vehicle in the lane when unintentionally crossing lane markers) and throttle management (to prevent sudden unintended acceleration in forward and reverse) systems in 2013 with the improved cameras. EyeSight has been very popular, equipped on approximately 90% of all Legacy and Outbacks sold in Japan at the beginning of 2012, and the engineers responsible for its development won a prize from the Japanese government that year.

As of 2021, EyeSight is standard on the Ascent, Forester, Legacy, and Outback. It is also standard on all CVT-equipped Crosstrek, Impreza, and WRX. It became standard on the automatic-equipped BRZ as of 2022.

=== Toyota ===
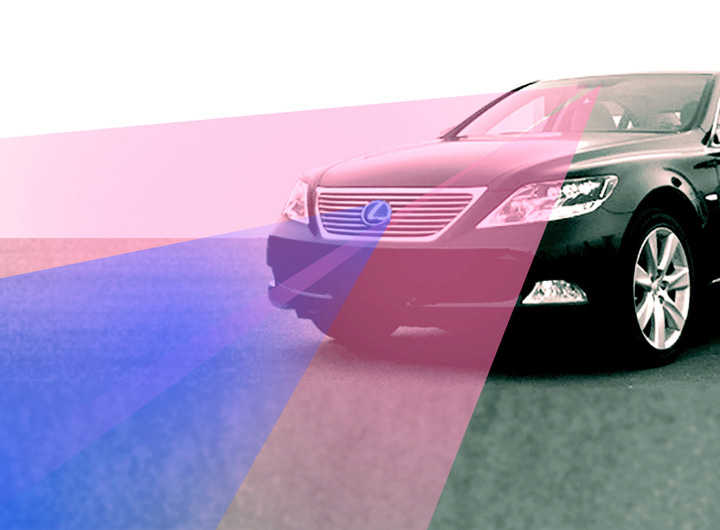
2008 LS 600h forward PCS diagram, with radar (blue) and stereo camera (red) coverage

Toyota's system, branded "Toyota Safety Sense" or "Lexus Safety System", is a radar-based system that uses a forward-facing millimeter-wave radar. When the system determines that a frontal collision is unavoidable, it preemptively tightens the seat belts, removing any slack, and pre-charges the brakes using brake assist to give the driver maximum stopping power when the driver depresses the brake pedal.

2003 February: Toyota launched PCS in the redesigned Japanese domestic market Harrier.

2003 August: added an automatic partial pre-crash braking system to the Celsior.

2003 September: PCS made available in North America on the Lexus LS 430, becoming the first radar-guided forward-collision warning system offered in the US.

2004: In July 2004, the Crown Majesta radar PCS added a single digital camera to improve the accuracy of collision forecast and warning and control levels.

2006: Pre-collision system with Driver Monitoring System introduced in March 2006 on the Lexus GS 450h using a CCD camera on the steering column. This system monitors the driver's face to determine where the driver is looking. If the driver's head turns away from the road and a frontal obstacle is detected, the system will alert the driver using a buzzer, and if necessary, pre-charge the brakes and tighten the safety belts.

2006: the Lexus LS introduced an advanced pre-collision system (APCS), added a twin-lens stereo camera located on the windshield, and a more sensitive radar to detect smaller "soft" objects such as animals and pedestrians. A near-infrared projector located in the headlights allows the system to work at night. With adaptive variable suspension (AVS) and electric power steering, the system can change the shock absorber firmness, steering gear ratios, and torque to aid the driver's evasive steering measures. The lane departure warning system will make automatic steering adjustments to help ensure that the vehicle maintains its lane in case the driver fails to react. Driver Monitoring System was introduced on the Lexus LS. The rear-end pre-collision system includes a rearward-facing millimeter-wave radar mounted in the rear bumper. The system adjusts the active head restraints by moving them upward and forward to reduce the risk of whiplash injuries if an imminent rear collision is detected.

2008: Improved driver monitoring system added on the Crown for detecting whether the driver's eyes are properly open. It monitors the driver's eyes to detect the driver's level of wakefulness. This system is designed to work even if the driver is wearing sunglasses at night.

2008: PCS with GPS-navigation linked brake assist function on the Crown. The system is designed to determine if the driver is late in decelerating at an approaching stop sign, will then sound an alert, and can also pre-charge the brakes to provide braking force if deemed necessary. This system works in certain Japanese cities and requires Japan-specific road markings that are detected by a camera.

2009: Crown added a front-side millimeter-wave radar to detect potential side collisions primarily at intersections or when another vehicle crosses the center line. The latest version tilts the rear seat upward, placing the passenger in a more ideal crash position if it detects a front or rear impact.

2012: Higher speed APCS on the Lexus LS enables deceleration from up to 60 km/h (37 mph), compared to the previous of 40 km/h (25 mph). The higher-speed APCS uses the same technologies as the current APCs. This system increases the braking force up to twice that applied by average drivers. It was not then available in US markets.

2013: Pre-collision system with pedestrian-avoidance steer assist and steering bypass assist can help prevent collisions in cases where automatic braking alone is not sufficient, such as when the vehicle is traveling too fast or a pedestrian suddenly steps into the vehicle's path. An onboard sensor detects pedestrians and issues a visual alert on the dashboard immediately in front of the driver if the system determines that there is a risk of collision. If the likelihood of a collision increases, the system issues an audio and visual alarm to encourage the driver to take evasive action, and the increased pre-collision braking force and automatic braking functions are activated. If the system determines that a collision cannot be avoided by braking alone and there is sufficient room for avoidance, steer assist is activated to steer the vehicle away from the pedestrian.

2016: Toyota announced it would make Toyota Safety Sense (TSS) and Lexus Safety System+ standard on nearly all Japan, Europe, and US models by the end of 2017.

2017: Lexus introduced the updated Lexus Safety System+ 2.0 on the fifth-generation LS. In the US 2017 model year, Toyota sold more vehicles equipped with collision warnings than any other single brand with a total of 1.4 million sold or 56% of their fleet.

2018: Toyota released its updated Toyota Safety Sense 2.0 (TSS 2.0) to include Lane Tracing Assist, Road Sign Assist, and Low Light Pedestrian Detection with Daytime Bicyclist Detection which improves the Pre-Collision System. The first Japanese car model to receive (TSS 2.0) is the executive Crown in its 15th generation.

2021: Lexus introduced the updated Lexus Safety System+ 3.0 in the Lexus NX. The suite contains a Risk Avoidance Emergency Steer Assist, a Right/Left Turn Oncoming Vehicle Detection/Braking, an Oncoming Vehicle Detection, a Dynamic Radar Cruise Control with Curve Speed Management, a Road Sign Assist, a Pre-Collision System, a Lane Assistance and an Intelligent High Beam.

=== Volkswagen ===
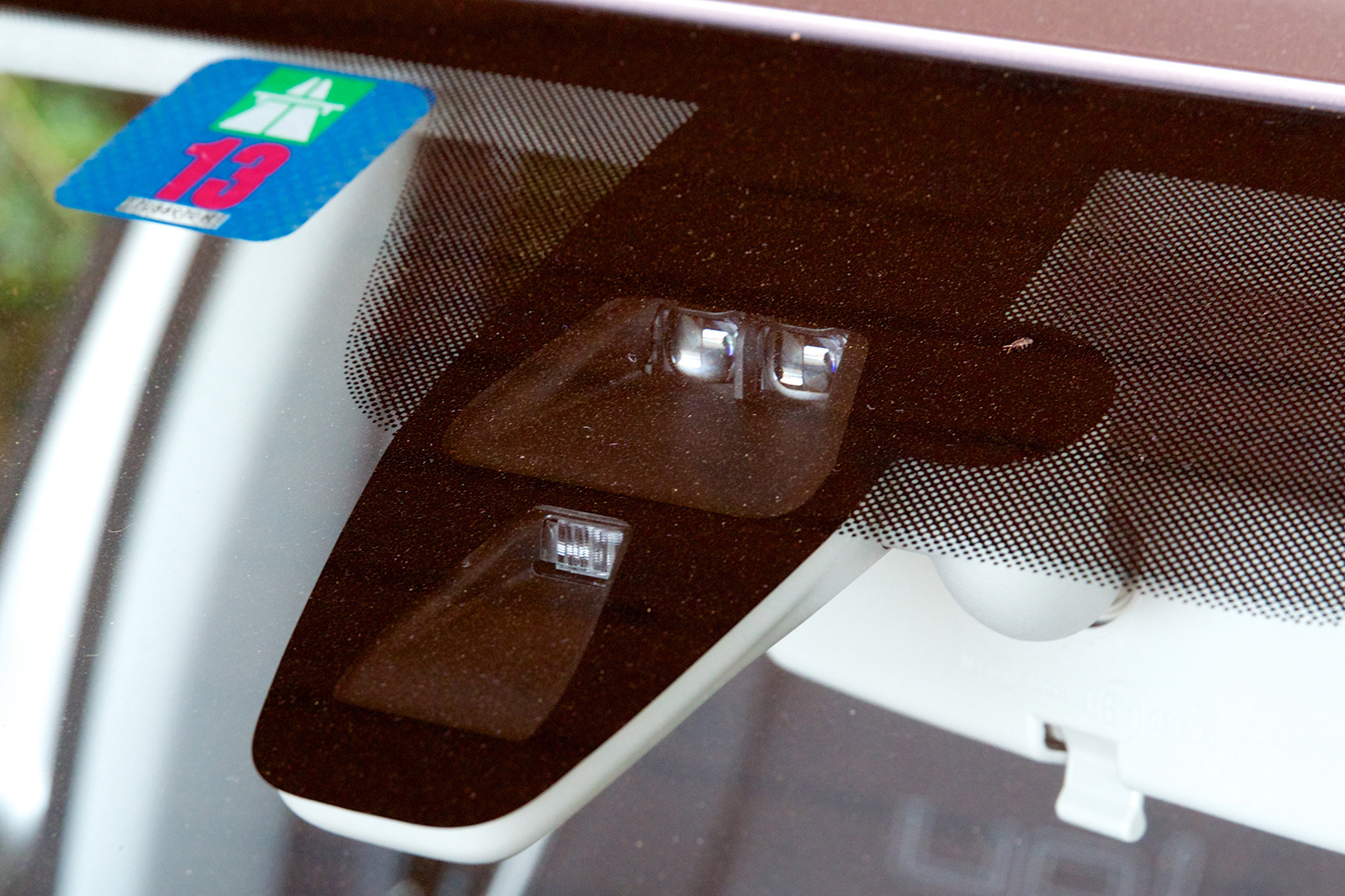
Laser sensor of a Volkswagen Up

2010: "Front Assist" on 2011 Volkswagen Touareg can brake the car to a stop in case of an emergency and tension the seat belts as a precautionary measure.

2012: Volkswagen Golf Mk7 introduced a "Proactive Occupant Protection" that will close the windows and retract the safety belts to remove excess slack if the potential for a forward crash is detected. Multi-collision brake system (automatic post-collision braking system) to automatically brake the car after an accident to avoid a second collision. City emergency braking automatically activates brakes at low speeds in urban situations.

2014: Volkswagen Passat (B8) introduced pedestrian recognition as a part of the system. It uses a sensor fusion between a camera and the radar sensor. There is an "emergency assist" in case of a non-reacting driver, the car takes control of the brakes and the steering until a complete stop. This is also found in the Volkswagen Golf Mk8.

=== Volvo ===
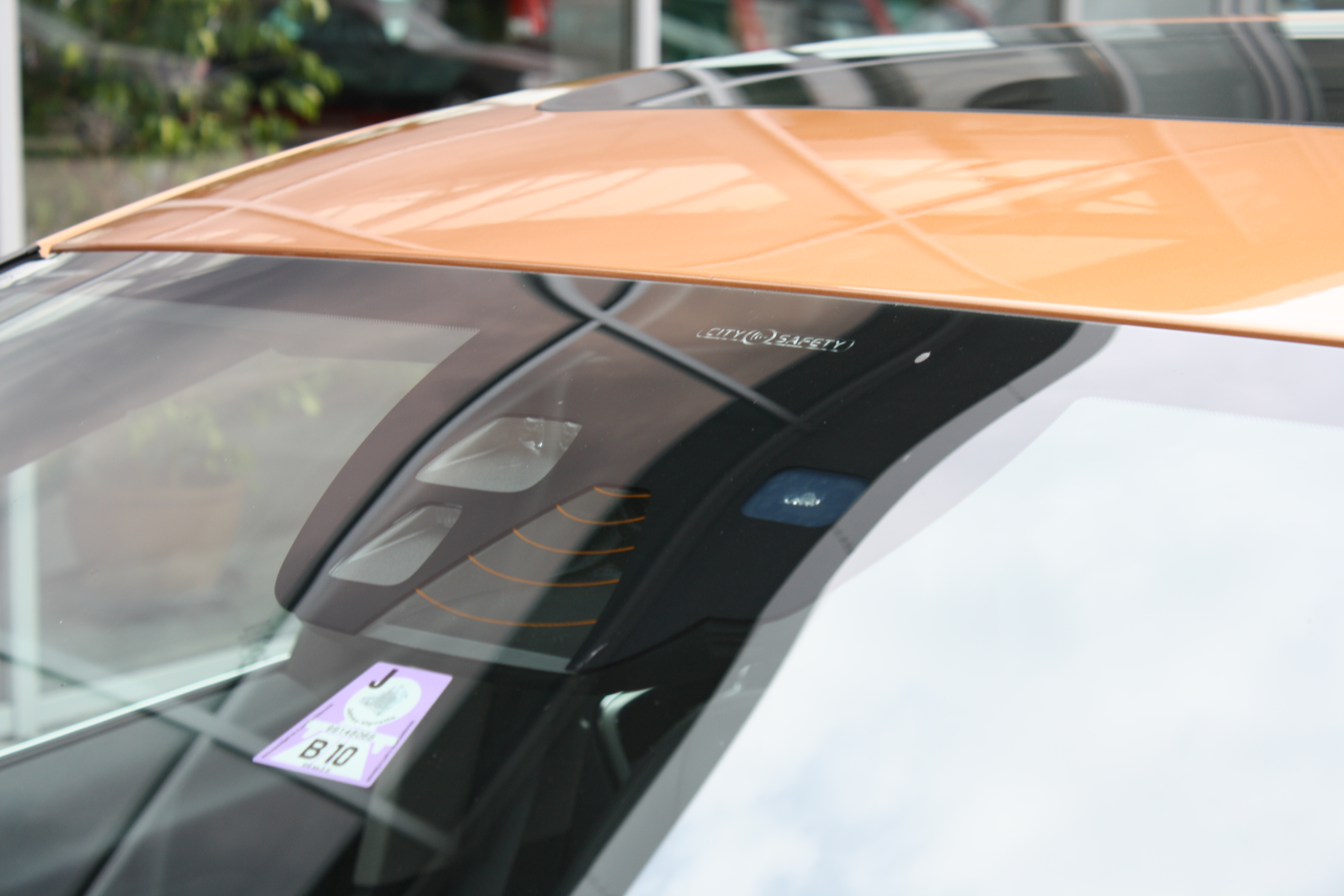
Volvo City Safety multiple cameras

2006: Volvo's "Collision Warning with Auto Brake" was introduced in 2007 S80. This system is powered by a radar/camera sensor fusion and provides a warning through a head up display that visually resembles brake lamps. If the driver does not react, the system pre-charges the brakes and increases the brake assist sensitivity to maximize driver braking performance. Later versions would automatically apply the brakes to minimize pedestrian impacts. In some models of Volvos, the automatic braking system can be manually turned off. The V40 also included the first pedestrian airbag, when it was introduced in 2012.

2013: Volvo introduced the first cyclist detection system. All Volvo automobiles now come standard with a lidar laser sensor that monitors the front of the roadway, and if a potential collision is detected, the safety belts will retract to reduce excess slack. Volvo now includes this safety device as an option in FH series trucks.

2015: "IntelliSafe" with auto brake at the intersection. The Volvo XC90 features automatic braking if the driver turns in front of an oncoming car. This is a common scenario at busy city crossings as well as on highways, where the speed limits are higher.

March 2020: Volvo recalled 121,000 cars over auto emergency braking failure. The system may not detect an object and so may not work as intended, increasing the risk of a crash.

== List of cars with available collision avoidance features ==
- Acura: ILX, MDX, RDX, RL RLX, TLX, Integra
- Audi: A3 from 2013, A6 from 2011, A7 from 2010, A8, Q7 from 2015
- BMW Group: 2 Series, 3 Series, 4 Series, 5 Series, 7 Series, Mini Cooper
- Buick: Enclave
- Cadillac: 2013 ATS, 2013 XTS
- Chevrolet: Tenth generation Impala, Traverse, Equinox, Silverado, Volt
- Cupra: Cupra Raval, Cupra Born, Cupra Tavascan, Cupra Formentor, Cupra Terramar
- Dodge: All models
- Ford: Edge, Escape, Everest, F-Series, Fiesta, Flex, Focus, Fusion, Kuga, Mustang, Ranger, Taurus, Transit Connect
- GMC: Acadia, Terrain
- Honda: Accord, Civic, Clarity, CR-V, Fit, HR-V, Insight, Odyssey, Passport, Pilot, Ridgeline, all models (since 2019)
- Hyundai: Elantra from 2016
- Infiniti: FX, EX, Q50, QX56, QX60
- Jeep: All Models
- Lexus: LS from 2003, GS (2005), IS (2005), RX (2008), NX (2014)
- Lincoln: Aviator, Continental, Corsair, MKS, MKZ, Nautilus, Navigator
- Mazda: Mazda2, Mazda3, Mazda6, CX-3, CX-5, CX-9
- Mercedes-Benz: Mercedes-Benz B Class, CLA Class, E-Class, S-Class, M Class
- Mitsubishi: Outlander, Pajero Sport
- Nissan: Nissan X-Trail Tekna, 2015 Nissan Rogue (2019) Nissan LEAF (2019), Nissan Altima (2019), Nissan Pathfinder (2020)
- Perodua Myvi (1.5 Advance), 2017
- Peugeot: 308, 2014
- SsangYong: Rexton, Tivoli
- SEAT: SEAT Tarraco, Seat Ateca, SEAT Arona, SEAT León (2012+), SEAT Ibiza (2017+), SEAT Mii
- Škoda Auto: Škoda Peaq, Škoda Epiq, Škoda Enyaq, Škoda Elroq, Škoda Kodiaq, Škoda Kamiq, Škoda Karoq, Škoda Superb, Škoda Octavia, Škoda Fabia, Škoda Scala
- Subaru: Ascent, BRZ (2022+), Crosstrek, Forester, Impreza, Legacy, Outback, WRX
- Suzuki: Kizashi, PRECRS, JDM only
- Tesla: Model S (starting with 2015 model year), Model X, Model 3, Model Y
- Toyota: All Models except Toyota 4Runner 2020 and up to get it and Yaris 2019 and up to get it
- Volkswagen: Volkswagen ID. series, Volkswagen Touareg (2010+), Volkswagen Tiguan (2016+), Volkswagen T-Roc, Volkswagen Golf (2012+), Volkswagen Polo (2017+), Volkswagen Passat (2014+), Volkswagen Jetta (2016+)
- Volvo: all models

== New car assessment program ==
Euro NCAP and C-NCAP and ANCAP are involved in taking into account the Autonomous Emergency Braking (AEB) in their respective New Car Assessment Program.

Since 2016, Euro NCAP has taken into account pedestrians in the AEB rating.

In 2018, Euro NCAP provided assessments for AEB city (since 2014), AEB interurban (since 2014), AEB pedestrian (since 2018), and AEB cyclist (since 2018). Since 2018, ANCAP has also provided assessments for AEB city, AEB interurban, AEB pedestrian, and cyclist.

== Cost ==
Many vehicles have AEB fitted as standard. The AEB is not available for every car. When AEB is available as an option, its cost can be in the £180 (AEB city only) – £1300 (regular AEB) range.

The cost of optional AEB will depend, in part, on whether certain other safety systems are installed. The electronic and sensor systems that underpin adaptive cruise control and forward-collision warning systems, for example, are well-suited, if not prerequisites, to an AEB system.

== Aviation ==
In aviation, systems such as the Traffic Collision Avoidance System (TCAS) and its successor, Airborne Collision Avoidance System X (ACAS X), are widely used to detect and prevent mid-air collisions. These systems rely on transponder signals and predictive algorithms to provide resolution advisories to pilots, and are standard in most commercial aircraft.

== Maritime ==
In the maritime domain, collision avoidance technologies are increasingly integrated into both commercial and recreational vessels. For example, Watchit has developed a smart navigation safety system that uses artificial intelligence to process data from onboard sensors, such as GPS, compass, sonar, wind, and speed, to generate real-time audio and visual alerts. The system is designed to help prevent both vessel-to-vessel collisions and groundings by dynamically adapting alert zones based on the vessel's speed and direction.

These domain-specific systems share similar goals with automotive CAS, aiming to reduce accidents by augmenting human situational awareness and reaction times.

== See also ==
- Adaptive cruise control
- Advanced Automatic Collision Notification
- Autonomous car
- Automotive night vision
- Brake Assist
- Electronic stability control
- Lane departure warning system
- Lidar#Autonomous vehicles
- Blind spot monitor
- Intelligent Car
- GPS tracking
- Moral Machine and trolley problem
