= Lincoln MKS =

Full-size luxury sedan

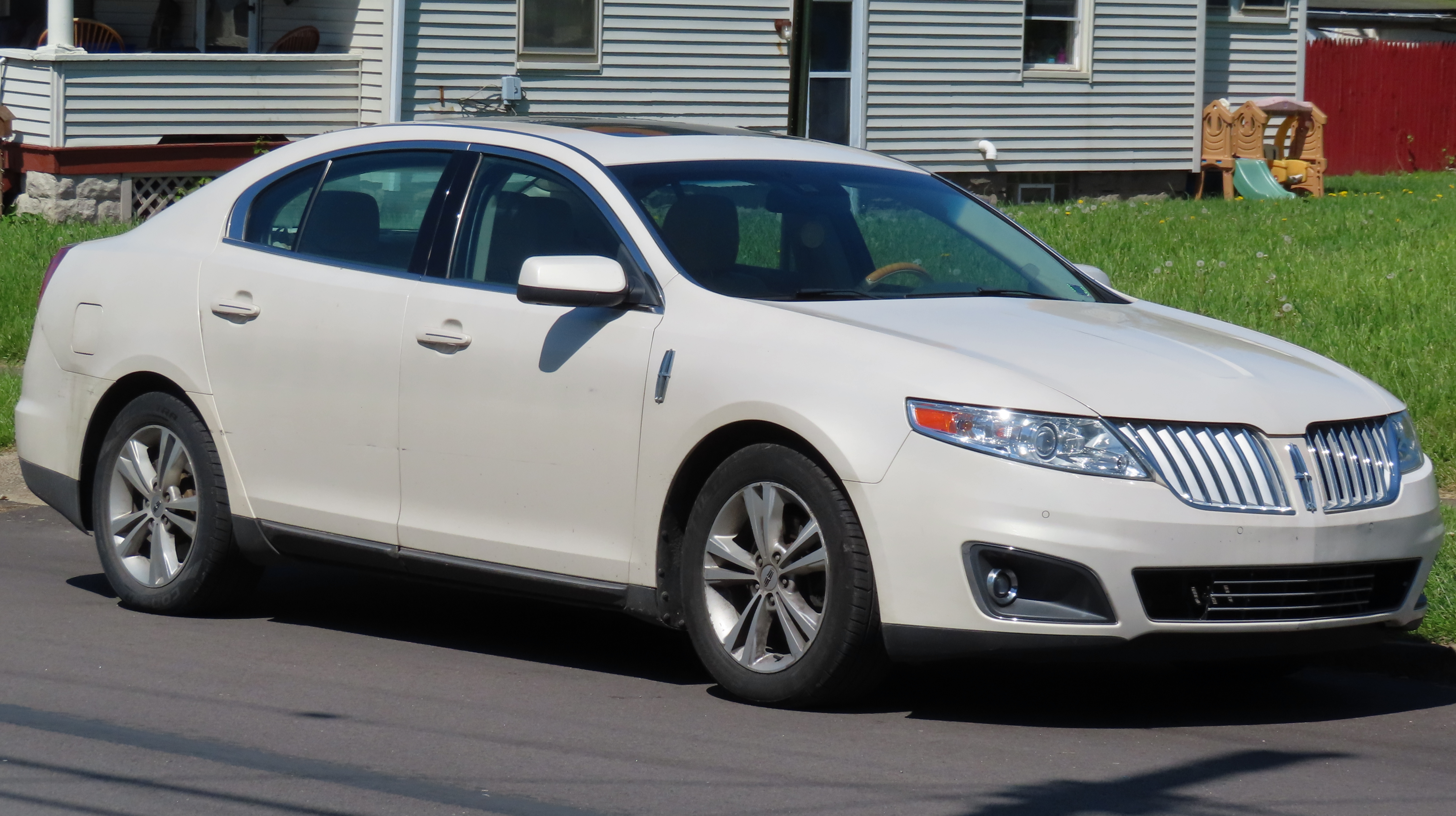
- 2009 Lincoln MKS

Overview
- Manufacturer: The Lincoln Motor Company (Ford Motor Company)
- Production: May 2008–2016
- Model years: 2009–2016
- Assembly: United States: Ford Chicago Assembly, Chicago, Illinois
- Designer: Peter Horbury (design chief); Robert Gelardi (exterior: 2005); Max Wolff (2013 facelift)

Body and chassis
- Class: Full-size luxury car
- Body style: 4-door sedan
- Layout: Front engine, front-wheel drive / all wheel drive
- Platform: Ford D3 platform
- Related: Ford Five Hundred, Mercury Montego, Mercury Sable; Ford Taurus; Ford Taurus X Ford Flex; Lincoln MKT; Volvo S80; Volvo S60; Volvo V70; Volvo XC70; Volvo XC90

Powertrain
- Engine: 3.7 L Cyclone V6; 3.7 L Cyclone Ti-VCT V6; 3.5 L EcoBoost twin-turbo V6
- Transmission: 6-speed 6F50 automatic 6-speed 6F55 automatic

Dimensions
- Wheelbase: 112.9 in (2,868 mm)
- Length: 2009–2012: 204.2 in (5,187 mm); 2013–2016 : 204.8 in (5,202 mm)
- Width: 75.9 in (1,928 mm)
- Height: 61.6 in (1,565 mm)
- Curb weight: 4,127 lb (1,872 kg) (Front-wheel drive); 4,276 lb (1,940 kg) (All-wheel drive)

Chronology
- Predecessor: Lincoln Continental
- Successor: Lincoln Continental (2017)

The Lincoln MKS is a full-size luxury car which was manufactured by Ford and marketed by its Lincoln division for the 2009-through-2016 model years (MY), having entered production in May 2008. Primarily sold in the North American market, it is a four-door sedan (Note: Also known as a saloon car.) with seating for five occupants and received a facelift for MY 2013.

Following the Lincoln MKR concept vehicle, Lincoln presented the MKS at the LA Auto Show in November 2007, with sales beginning in June 2008. It is based on the Ford D3 platform (a revised variant of the Volvo P2 platform) with a front-mounted engine and either front-wheel drive or all-wheel drive. The MKS shares this platform with the other so-called Chicago D3's, the Ford Flex, Lincoln MKT, and the fifth-generation Ford Taurus, which were manufactured at Ford's Chicago Assembly plant in Chicago, Illinois.

The MKS uses V6 engines, with the launch model using a 3.7-liter Ford Cyclone engine, while a twin-turbocharged 3.5-liter EcoBoost engine (shared with the Taurus SHO) was added for 2010. The base Cyclone engine was revised to a Ti-VCT specification for 2013.

The MKS was discontinued after 2016, with domestic MKS production having reached 100,248 for MY 2009–2016. It was replaced by the tenth generation Lincoln Continental.

== Features and updates ==
With sales beginning in the summer of 2008 for model year 2009, standard equipment included radar autonomous cruise control system, optional adaptive HID headlights, automatic HID headlights, foglights, capless fuel filler marketed as Easy Fuel, foldable power adjustable mirrors with memory, 18x7.5-inch machined aluminum wheels, 6-speaker audio system with an AM/FM radio and 6-disc in-dash CD changer, Sirius satellite radio with a six-month prepaid subscription, dual-zone automatic climate control, auto-dimming rear view mirror with compass, 12-way, heated and cooled power driver and passenger seats, heated rear seats, power tilt and telescoping steering wheel with memory, universal garage door opener, two sunglass holders, Lincoln SYNC, intelligent access system with a push button start, and SecuriCode Invisible, a keypad system mounted on the driver's B-pillar with a capacitive touch panel, to enable tiered or time-restricted permissions, i.e., the code giving access to the vehicle but not its operation, the code being easily changed to prevent subsequent vehicle access.

The standard MKS interior uses dash-top leatherette and two real wood trims, depending on leather color: ebony reclaimed from furniture makers and others sources, minimizing environmental impact, and olive-ash with a grain pattern created when the roots of two trees grow together. Interior leather, supplied by the Scottish company, Bridge of Weir, uses vegetable dyes and a chromium-free tanning process for a softer surface. Safety features included dual front airbags, driver and passenger side airbags, and side curtain airbags.

Equipment packages include the Navigation Package (a DVD navigation system; Technology Package (adaptive HID headlights, rain-sensing windshield wipers, a forward-sensing system, a power sunshade for the rear window, and the intelligent access system with push button start); the Ultimate Package included the Navigation and Technology packages and added a dual panel moonroof, premium 19x8-inch painted alloy wheels, Ultimate seating trim with color-keyed suede strip in the center of the seat back, and Lincoln star logo embroidered on the front headrests. An Aluminum Applique Package (aluminum dash trim in the place of wood, as well as a leather-wrapped steering wheel and shift knob), is also available, requiring the Navigation, Technology, or Ultimate packages. Individual options included all-wheel drive, 19x8-inch machined aluminum wheels, 20x8-inch polished aluminum wheels, adaptive cruise control, and a PowerCode remote starter.

An optional THX audio system, designed by THX, used a Configurable Speaker Array (CSA) and proprietary "Slot Speaker technologies" located in the center of the instrument panel to control and direct the sound image, creating a detailed, home-theater-like ambiance, reproducing music as recorded. The CSA used several small, powerful speakers, dedicated amplifiers and digital signal processing (DSP) as well as a single, dash-mounted "slot" speaker to combine left and right audio channels and widen the sound image before distributing it.

As with other models using the D3 platform, including its Ford Five Hundred and fifth and sixth generation Ford Taurus predecessors, the MKS unibody was designed to channel impact forces around the passenger compartment using a system marketed as SPACE architecture (Side Protection and Cabin Enhancement), an adaptation of Volvo's Side Impact Protection System (SIPS) dating to the period when Ford had owned Volvo Cars as part of its Premier Automotive Group. SPACE used a hydroformed high strength steel tube embedded in the floor that runs the width of the vehicle from B-pillar to B-pillar and along the rocker panels to form a safety cage to help protect passengers in side impacts.

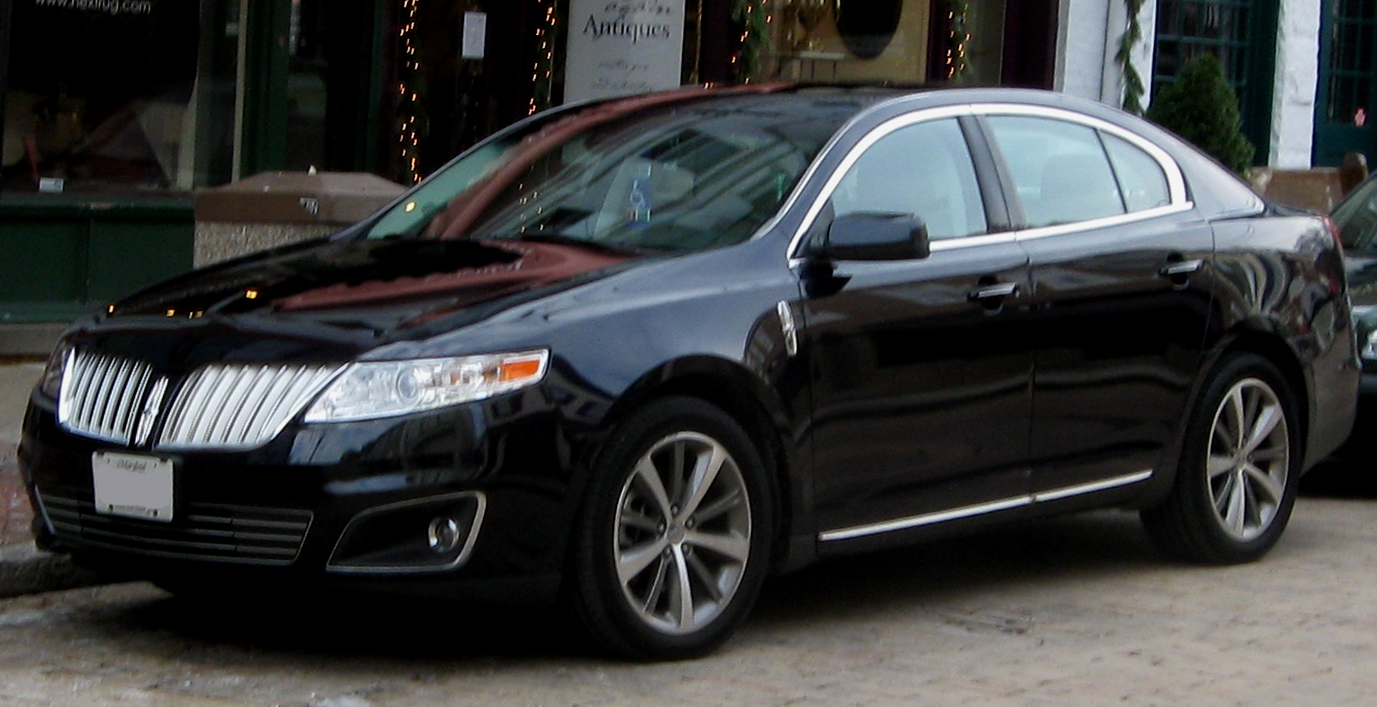

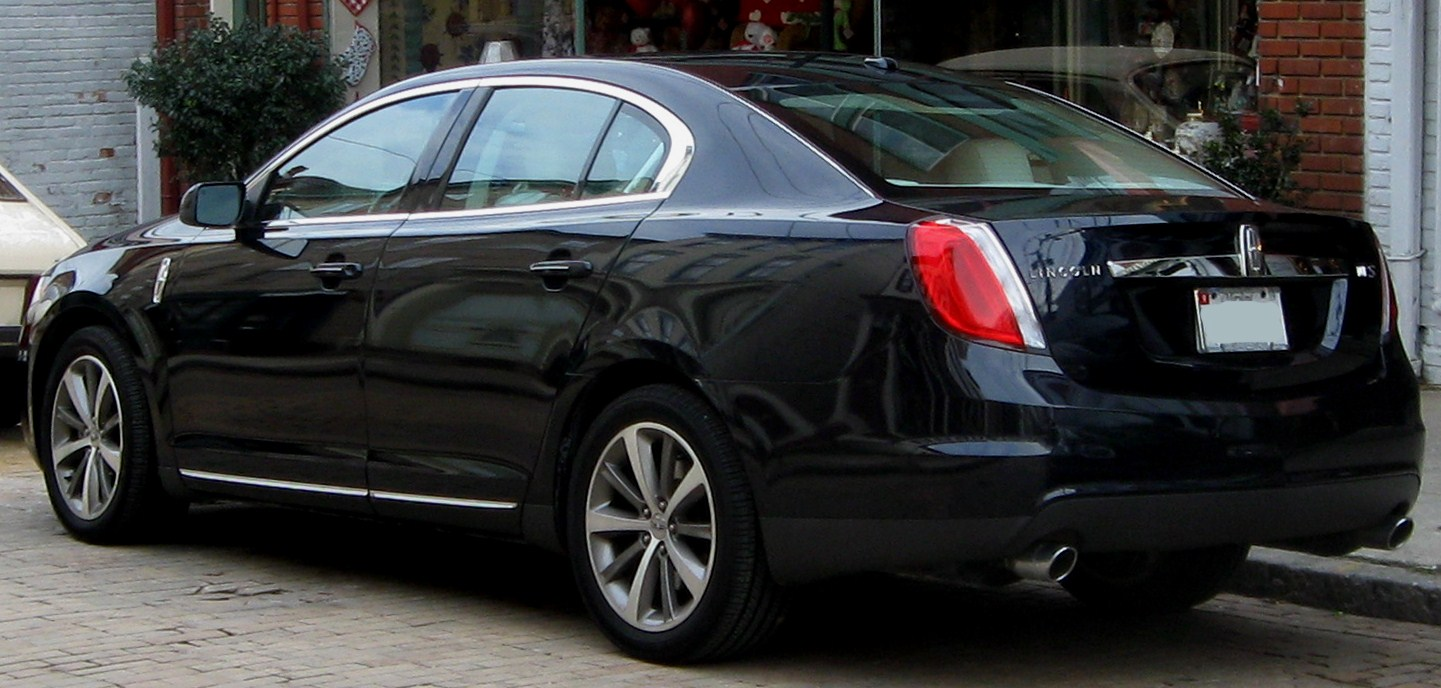
2009–2012

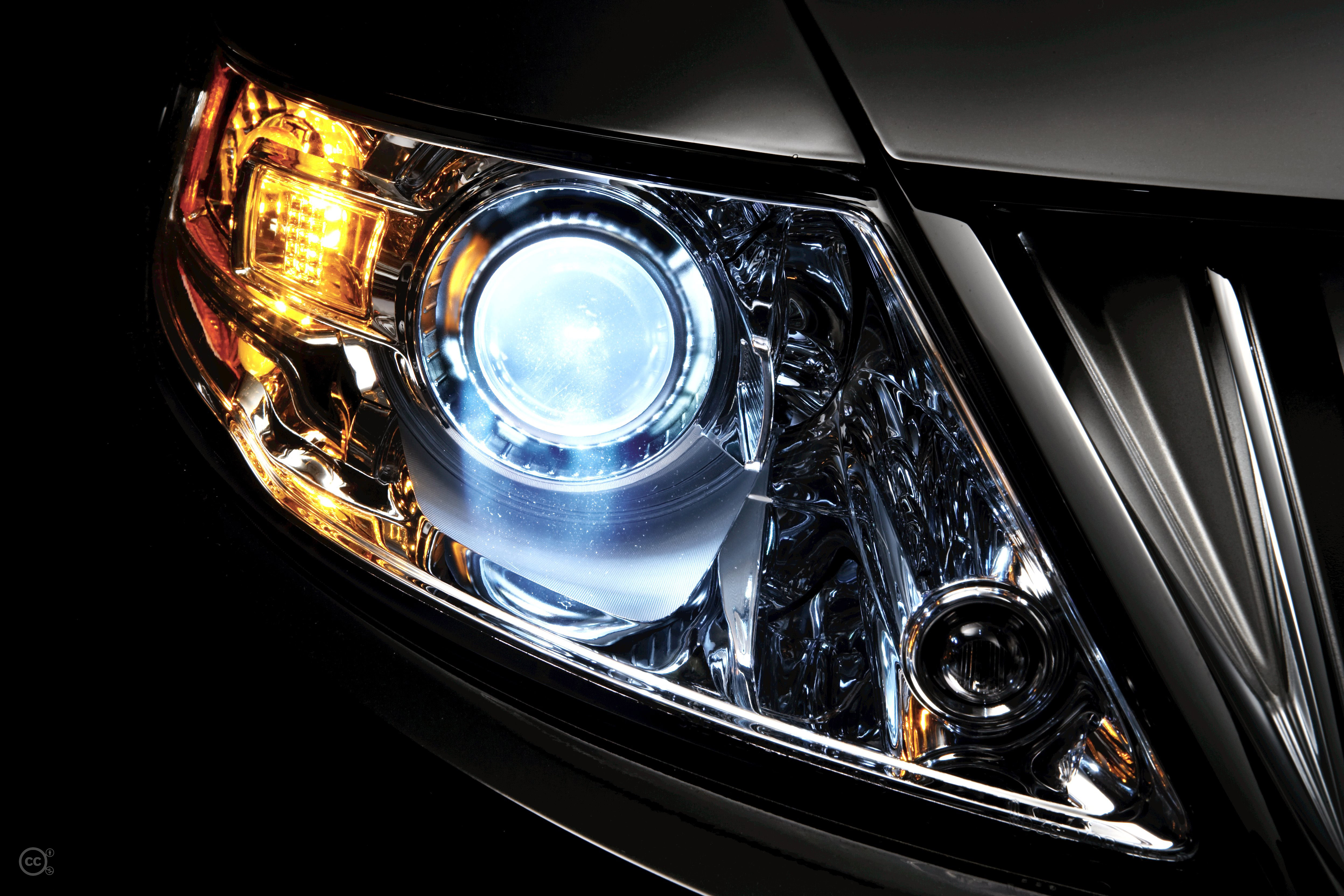
Illuminated HID projector low/high beam headlamp

Active Park Assist, using ultrasonic sensors to measure a parking space and operate the steering wheel to parallel parking the vehicle, became available in mid-2009 for MY 2010. The system used software control of the Electric Power Steering (EPS).

The MKS used Ford's D3 platform with MacPherson struts and rearward-facing lower L-arms with a 26 mm (1.0 in) stabilizer bar in the front and a multilink coil over shock setup with stamped steel lower control arms and cast upper control arms in the rear; "Lincoln Drive Control" with continuously controlled damping (CCD) available as optional feature. The car featured four-wheel antilock disc brakes (12.25-inch (311 mm) rotors in the front and 12.75-inch (324 mm) rotors in the rear) with standard AdvanceTrac traction control and Roll Stability Control (RSC). Front-wheel drive (FWD) was standard while all-wheel drive (AWD) was optional. The MKS is powered by an all-aluminum 3.7 L Duratec DOHC V6, a larger bore derivative of the Duratec 35 in Ford's Cyclone engine group. The engine was designed to accept either regular grade, 87 octane gasoline or premium grade, 91 octane gasoline. Using regular grade gasoline, the 3.7 L V6 produces 273 hp (204 kW) at 6250 rpm and 270 lb⋅ft (366 N⋅m) of torque at 4250 rpm. Using premium grade gasoline results in a small boost in output to 275 hp (205 kW) at 6250 rpm and 276 lb⋅ft (374 N⋅m) of torque at 4250 rpm. The 6F50 6-speed automatic transmission is equipped with SelectShift, simulating the operation of a manual transmission.

MY 2010: 2010 models continued to offer a 3.7-liter, 24-valve Duratec engine, adding an optional twin-turbocharged 3.5 Liter V6 making 355 hp (265 kW) and 350 lb⋅ft (475 N⋅m) of torque, standard on AWD models. Revisions included additional bracing and strategically placed sound-deadening materials, suspension improvements to improve NVH, mount and bushing revisions, and spring/shock tuning and front suspension geometry revisions. A revised instrument cluster featured three large binnacles, one with a transmission gear indicator.

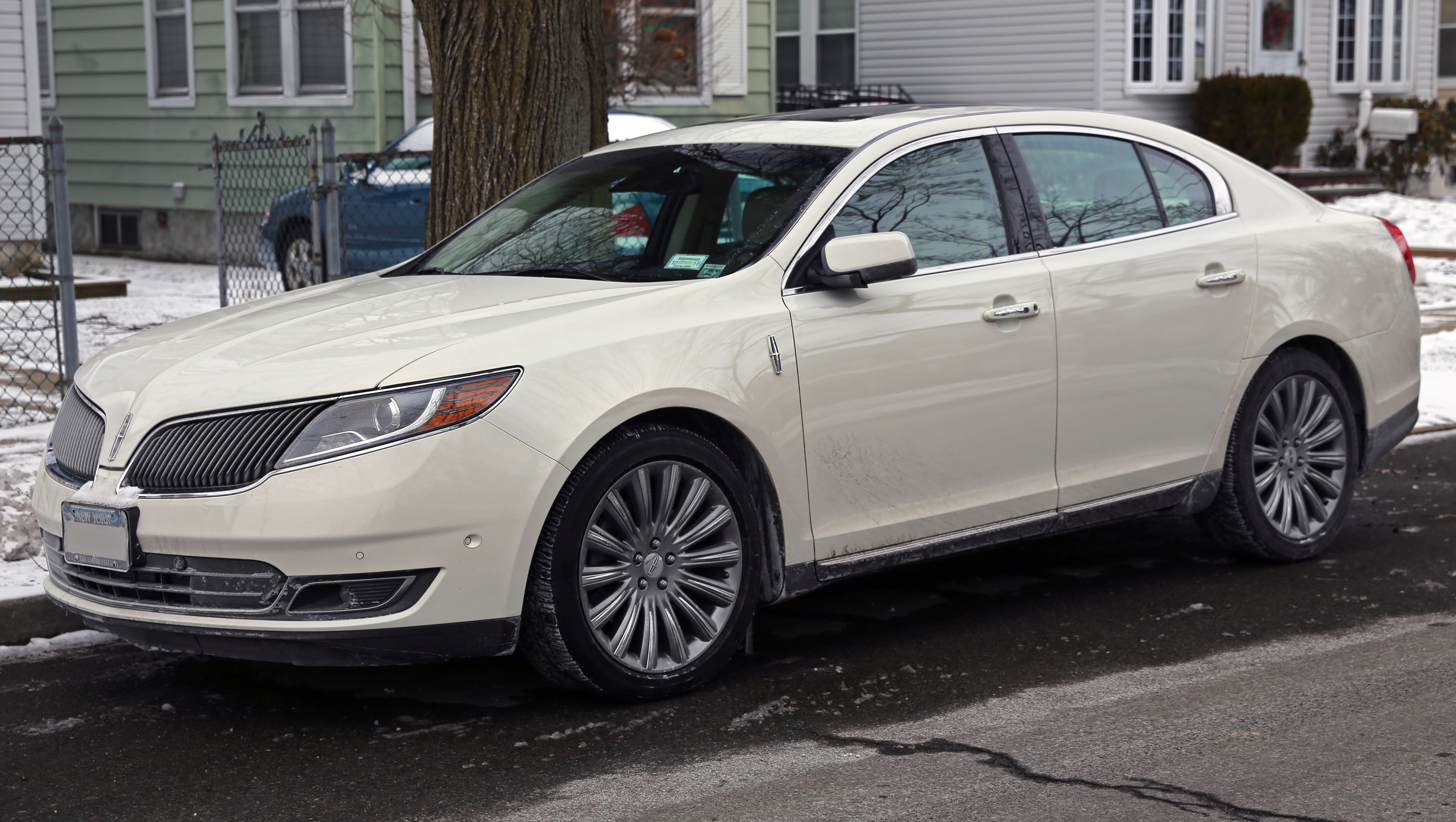
2013 Lincoln MKS

MY 2013: A facelifted MKS debuted for 2013 at the 2011 Los Angeles International Auto Show, with a mildly revised exterior, including a larger trunk opening with a lower liftover height and the license plate nacelle relocated to the bumper fascia from the trunk lid. Interior revisions included a revised instrument panel, front digital instrument cluster and touch capacitive switchgear, "Multicontour" seats, revised interior wood choices (Prussian Burl and Brown Swirl Walnut), auto high beam, adaptive cruise control, forward collision warning, blind spot information system with cross-traffic alert, lane-keeping system, electric power-assisted steering (EPAS) and a continuously controlled damping (CCD) system. The new MKS also grew slightly in overall length to 205.6 in (5,222 mm), while the output of the 3.5-liter EcoBoost model increased to 365 hp (272 kW) at 5,500 rpm. The standard engine was replaced by an upgraded Ti-VCT version of the same, producing up to 304 hp (227 kW) at 6,500 rpm.

MY 2014: A backup camera became standard equipment for 2014.

MY 2015: For 2015, the rear deck lid received chrome trim stretching horizontally across the lid. The Lincoln lettering was increased in size and centered above this new trim section following along its length. The MKS emblem was moved to the left side corner of the lid.

MY 2016: For 2016, the final model year for the MKS, the rear trunk lid featured widely spaced lettering spelling out L I N C O L N across its width.

== Reception ==
A reviewer from Canada's National Post gave the MKS a positive reception in a comparison test with the Cadillac STS and Infiniti M45, two cars that Ford picked to bring along.

A road test of the AWD-equipped MKS model by Car and Driver recorded acceleration from 0 to 60 mph in 7.5 seconds and a quarter-mile in 15.7 seconds at 90 mph (145 km/h). Testers noted the MKS' 4300 lbs weight. Ford introduced its EcoBoost V6, an all-aluminum, twin-turbocharged, direct injection 3.5 L DOHC V6, in the 2010 MKS arriving in showrooms in the summer of 2009.

The MKS has dimensions comparable to the 2010 Audi A8 4.2 FSI quattro, a sedan with all-wheel drive which is equipped with a naturally aspirated 4.2 L V8 engine with direct gasoline injection. The MKS is almost an inch longer than the A8L (long-wheelbase version), an inch wider and five inches (127 mm) taller, has four more cubic feet of trunk space, and extra 25 lb⋅ft (34 N⋅m) of torque, while being 100 lb (45 kg) lighter. The MKS starts at $30,000 less than the base A8. The MKS also undercuts several mid-luxury cars with V8 engines and all-wheel drive by $10,000, such as the Audi A6 4.2 FSI quattro and the Infiniti M45x.

While praised for its large interior and long list of features, the MKS has been criticized for not being as refined as other luxury sedans in a similar price range. It is also noted that the MKS's platform-mate, the Ford Taurus, offers the same powertrain and many available technological features, starting at an MSRP of $10,000 less than the MKS.

== End of production ==
The MKS was replaced by the 2017–2020 Lincoln Continental, following a like-named 2016 concept. The Chicago Assembly Plant where the MKS was manufactured continued with Ford Taurus production until March 2019 as well as the Ford Explorer and Police Interceptor vehicles.

== Sales ==
Calendar year	Total sales
2008	12,982
2009	17,174
2010	14,417
2011	12,217
2012	12,524
2013	10,793
2014	8,160
2015	6,877
2016	4,951
2017	153
Total sales:	100,248

The MKS made its first appearance as a concept car at the 2006 North American International Auto Show in Detroit, Michigan, presenting Lincoln's design direction for their new full-size flagship sedan.

The concept included Lincoln's signature waterfall, cross-hatched grille with a crosshatching. The concept car's headlights featured adaptive lighting that pivoted the headlight projectors with steering inputs. The headlight assemblies incorporated a series of LEDs that would blink in sequence for turn indication. Side vents at the rear of the front wheel wells were adorned with the Lincoln star. The concept featured a large sunroof and moonroof combination that takes the place of a conventional roof. The concept's rear were LED-based parking and brake lamps and dual chrome, trapezoidal-shaped exhaust tips. The concept rode on 20x8.5-inch, ten spoke wheels.

The concept's seats used cream-colored Aniline leather; doors and interior panels used pearl-white suede, and the dash used dark grey suede. Instrumentation and controls featured satin nickel inserts and chrome trim with backlighting provided by white LEDs. An applique of real maple wood ran across the instrument panel, dividing it into upper and lower sections. Features included Bluetooth device connectivity, a DVD-based navigation system, a 14-speaker, 500-watt audio system, a passive entry system that identifies the driver and allows starting the vehicle by carrying its key fob, and a push button ignition system. Safety was provided by dual front airbags, driver and passenger side airbags, and side curtain airbags.

The concept, internally designated model D385, used Ford's front-drive, Volvo-derived D3 platform shared with the Ford Five Hundred, Ford Freestyle, and Mercury Montego, featuring independent suspension with MacPherson struts and rearward-facing lower L-arms with a stabilizer bar in the front and a multilink coil over shock setup with a stabilizer bar in the rear. The MKS Concept featured an active all-wheel drive system. Powering the concept was a Ford/Yamaha 4.4 L DOHC V8 producing 315 hp (235 kW) at 4500 rpm and 320 lb⋅ft (434 N⋅m) of torque at 3000 rpm. The engine used a 6-speed automatic transmission.
