= Maritime Collision Avoidance System =

Technologies used to prevent collisions and groundings at sea

Maritime Collision Avoidance Systems (MCAS) are integrated technologies used to prevent collisions and groundings at sea by enhancing vessel situational awareness. These systems combine data from multiple onboard sensors such as radar, AIS, GPS, sonar, and compass, with real-time processing algorithms, often employing artificial intelligence, to issue navigational alerts, assess risks, or initiate corrective actions.

While traditional systems such as radar and the Automatic Identification System (AIS) rely on manual interpretation, newer platforms increasingly incorporate autonomous or semi-autonomous decision-making capabilities. These systems often utilize AI to analyze real-time sensor input and generate predictive alerts, assisting with navigation in complex or low-visibility environments. Examples include SEA.AI, which combines thermal imaging and object recognition to identify non-transmitting obstacles, and Watchit.ai, which focuses on real-time collision prediction for recreational vessels.

MCAS technologies share conceptual similarities with collision avoidance systems used in aviation (such as TCAS and ACAS X) and in automotive applications, reflecting a broader trend toward autonomous safety technologies across transportation domains.

== Background and significance ==
Maritime Collision Avoidance Systems (MCAS) emerged in response to longstanding safety concerns in marine navigation. According to the European Maritime Safety Agency, thousands of maritime incidents are reported annually, including collisions, groundings, and near misses, which endanger human life, harm the environment, and disrupt global shipping operations.

Traditional navigational tools have been central to situational awareness at sea. These systems provide real-time data on vessel location, movement, and proximity to other traffic or hazards, often using calculated parameters like Closest Point of Approach (CPA) and Time to CPA (TCPA).

However, they face important limitations. Environmental conditions like fog, rain, and sea spray can reduce sensor accuracy and range. In addition, many systems rely on cooperative data transmission (e.g., AIS), meaning they cannot detect vessels or objects that do not emit signals. Small, fast, or non-reflective objects often go undetected.

To address these gaps, newer MCAS platforms employ multi-sensor fusion, combining inputs from radar, AIS, optical and thermal cameras, and GPS to detect and classify nearby targets. Some systems use AI-based risk models to prioritize threats and issue alerts. For example, SEA.AI integrates thermal imaging with object recognition to detect non-transmitting hazards and is reported to be in use on over 500 vessels worldwide, including offshore racing yachts.

These developments represent a shift from purely reactive systems to proactive, predictive approaches, enhancing safety in increasingly congested and technologically complex maritime environments.

== Types of MCAS technologies ==
Modern Maritime Collision Avoidance Systems (MCAS) integrate multiple sensor types to improve detection accuracy and situational awareness. Common components include:

1. Marine radar
  Radar: Marine radar systems, typically operating on X‑band and S‑band frequencies, detect objects by emitting microwave pulses and analyzing their reflections. S‑band radars are less affected by weather conditions like rain and sea clutter, while X‑band radars offer higher resolution in clear environments.
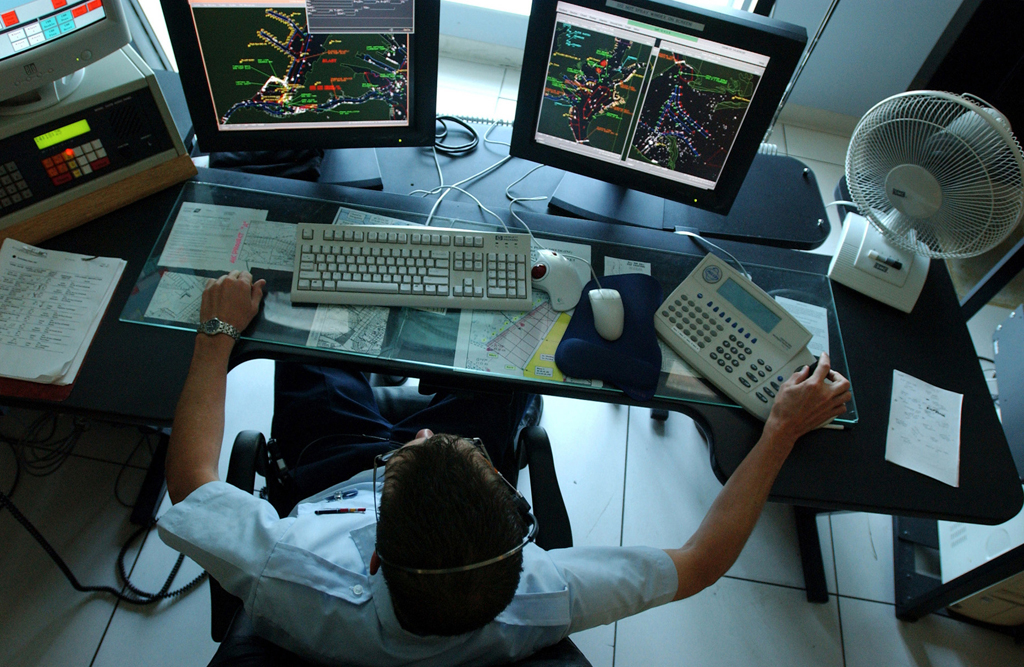
2. Automatic Identification System
  Automatic Identification System (AIS): A cooperative system transmitting VHF signals containing vessel data such as position, speed, and heading. While AIS is widely used for commercial traffic, it cannot detect non-transmitting vessels or objects.
3. Optical and thermal cameras: These passive sensors capture visual and infrared imagery, enabling detection of small craft, debris, buoys, and persons in the water. Thermal imaging is particularly useful in low-visibility conditions. Systems like SEA.AI integrate such cameras with object recognition algorithms to detect non-cooperative targets.
4. LiDAR and sonar: Less common on small vessels, these systems provide detailed 3D spatial mapping (LiDAR) or underwater obstacle detection (sonar). They are often found on military, commercial, or autonomous vessels where high-precision sensing is required.
5. Sensor fusion platforms: These systems synthesize data from multiple inputs into a unified risk model. Sensor fusion reduces the limitations of individual systems and enhances overall reliability. For example, Sea Machines’ SM300 integrates multiple data streams into a single user interface, while SEA.AI combines radar and imaging for 360-degree awareness.

By combining complementary sensors and processing methods, MCAS platforms improve detection of both cooperative and non-cooperative targets, even under challenging environmental conditions.

== Operational use ==
Maritime Collision Avoidance Systems are used across a range of vessel types and operational contexts. In commercial shipping, MCAS help large cargo ships maintain safe distances in busy traffic lanes, detect smaller vessels or uncharted obstacles, and comply with international navigational safety regulations. Integration with systems such as the Electronic Chart Display and Information System (ECDIS), autopilot, and bridge alert management platforms enables real-time route adjustments and hazard notifications.

Autonomous and semi-autonomous vessels are a growing application area. Uncrewed Surface Vessels (USVs), deployed for offshore energy, research, or naval operations, rely on MCAS for continuous environmental scanning and independent decision-making. These systems support automated navigation, obstacle avoidance, and adherence to COLREGs without human intervention.

In the recreational and sport sailing sectors, MCAS technologies assist with situational awareness under limited visibility, night conditions, or high traffic. Systems such as SEA.AI and Watchit.ai have been installed on leisure boats and performance yachts to detect floating hazards, non-illuminated vessels, or debris using thermal imaging and predictive alert algorithms.

The growing adoption of MCAS reflects both technological progress and heightened demand for navigation safety across the maritime sector, particularly in congested waters and under challenging environmental conditions.
