= Automated lane keeping systems =

Autonomous driving system

Automated lane keeping systems (ALKS), also described as traffic jam chauffeurs, is an autonomous driving system that doesn't require driver supervision on motorways. ALKS is an international standard set out in UN-ECE regulation 157 and amounts to Level 3 vehicle automation. It is essentially a more robust combination of adaptive cruise control (ACC) and lane centering assist (LCA). When activated, it allows the driver to do non-driving tasks until alerted otherwise.

== History ==
In 2021, Mercedes-Benz has received German approval for an ALKS self-driving technology complying with UN-R157 legal requirements.

Mercedes-Benz says that customers will be able to buy an S-Class with the Drive Pilot technology in the first half of 2022, enabling them to drive in conditionally automated mode at speeds of up to 60 km/h (37mph) in heavy traffic or congested situations on suitable stretches of motorway in Germany.

The regulation was signed by 54 states on 22 January 2021.

Entry into force in the European Union is 22 January 2022 for cars.

Initially, the regulation allows for automated driving up to 60 km/h (35 mph). An amendment for an increased speed for automated driving up to 130 km/h (80 mph) is planned to enter into force from January 2023.

== Regulation ==
In all contracting countries, the date of entry into force of UNECE regulation 157 is 22 January 2021.

Within six months from the date of depositary notification C.N.297.2020.TREATIES-XI.B.16 of 22 July 2020 by which the Secretary-General transmitted to the Governments of the Contracting Parties the text of draft United Nations Regulation No. 157, none of the Contracting Parties to the Agreement notified the Secretary-General of their intention not to apply the said United Nations Regulation on the date of its entry into force, under paragraphs 3 and 4 of article 1 of the Agreement. Therefore, following Article 1 (3) of the Agreement, the draft United Nations Regulation is adopted as United Nations Regulation No. 157. Per paragraphs, 3 and 4 of article 1 of the Agreement, the date of entry into force of United Nations Regulation No. 157 for all Contracting Parties is 22 January 2021.

— The Secretary-General of the United Nations, 1 February 2021

== Transition period ==
ALKS’s standard safety concept defines a 10 seconds transition period so that human driver must remain able to respond to a system request so that the human driver assume control of the vehicle when driving system do not do it anymore:

Transition demand
"is a logical and intuitive procedure to transfer the Dynamic Driving Task (DDT) from the system (automated control) to the human driver (manual control). This request is given from the system to the human driver."
Transition phase
"means the duration of the transition demand."

When local law allows the human driver to focus on non-driving tasks such as reading a book or watching a video while the automated driving system is engaged, a liability question may be raised following a takeover request: who own the liability once the 10 seconds transition period has achieved?

In the United Kingdom, the 10 seconds transition period is questioned regarding the driver capacity to take back control quickly and safely.

== Requirements ==
ALKS requires multiple criteria:

- driver seated, attached and available;
- proper functioning of the Data Storage System for Automated Driving (DSSAD);
- motorway type lane: road prohibited to pedestrians and cyclists equipped with a physical separation between the two directions of traffic;
- other weather conditions.

=== Collision avoidance features ===
ALKS deals with some cases of collision avoidance.

ALKS defines some concepts:

Imminent collision risk describes a situation or an event which leads to a collision of the vehicle with another road user or an obstacle which cannot be avoided by a braking demand with lower than 5 m/s

— Uniform provisions concerning the approval of vehicles about automated lane-keeping systems

Emergency Manoeuvre (EM) is a maneuver performed by the system in case of an event in which the vehicle is at imminent collision risk and has the purpose of avoiding or mitigating a collision.

— Uniform provisions concerning the approval of vehicles about automated lane-keeping systems

The activated system shall not cause any collisions that are reasonably foreseeable and preventable. If a collision can be safely avoided without causing another one, it shall be avoided. When the vehicle is involved in a detectable collision, the vehicle shall be brought to a standstill.

— Uniform provisions concerning the approval of vehicles concerning automated lane-keeping systems

The activated system shall detect the distance to the next vehicle in front as defined in paragraph 7.1.1. and shall adapt the vehicle speed to avoid collision.

— Uniform provisions concerning the approval of vehicles about automated lane-keeping systems

The activated system shall be able to bring the vehicle to a complete stop behind a stationary vehicle, a stationary road user, or a blocked lane of travel to avoid a collision. This shall be ensured up to the maximum operational speed of the system.

— Uniform provisions concerning the approval of vehicles concerning automated lane-keeping systems

The activated system shall avoid a collision with a leading vehicle (...)

The activated system shall avoid a collision with a cutting in the vehicle (...)

The activated system shall avoid a collision with an unobstructed crossing pedestrian in front of the vehicle.

— Uniform provisions concerning the approval of vehicles concerning automated lane-keeping systems

This document clarifies the derivation process to define conditions under which automated lane-keeping systems (ALKS) shall avoid a collision

— Uniform provisions concerning the approval of vehicles about automated lane-keeping systems, Guidance on traffic disturbance critical scenarios for ALKS
