= Stage Door Canteen =

Entertainment venue

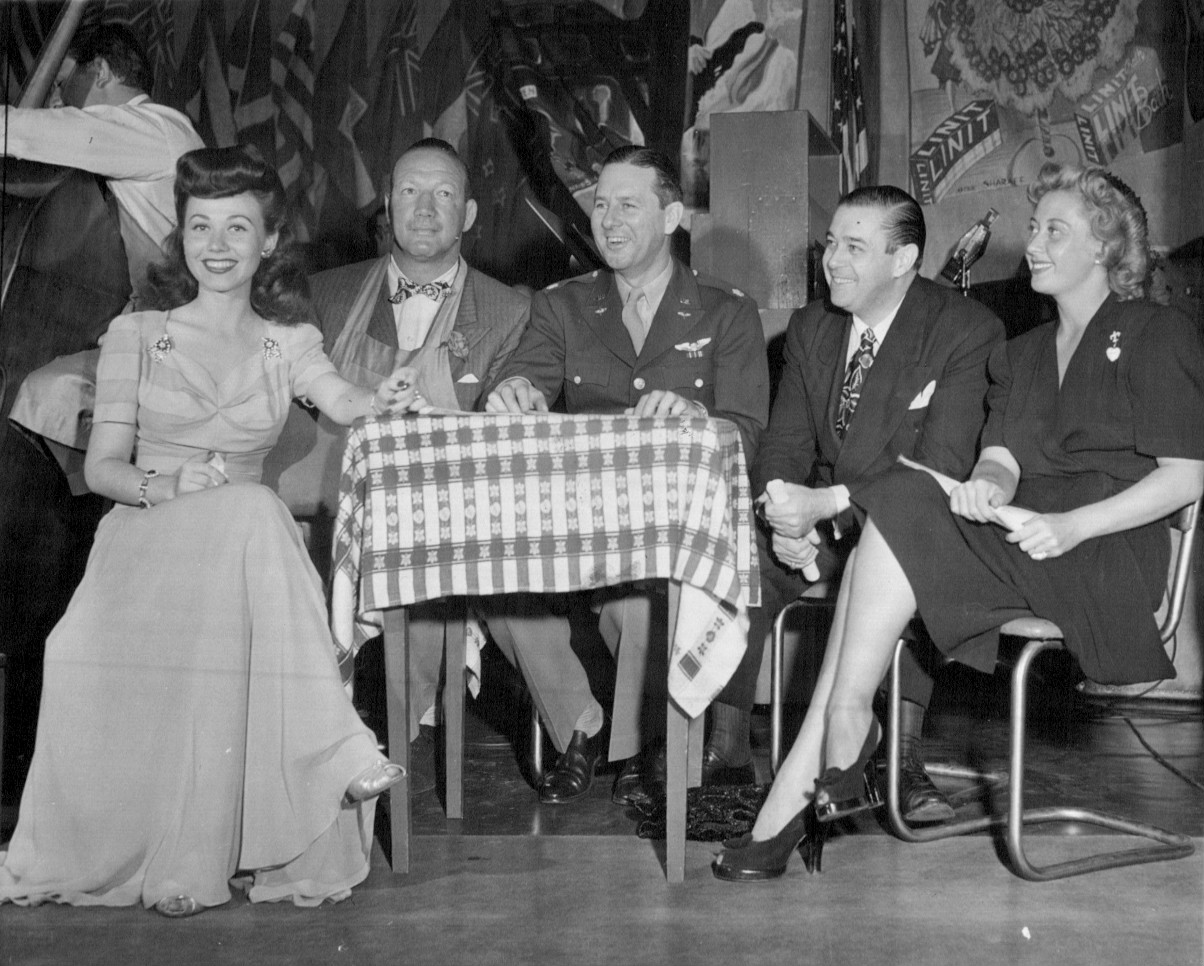
Connie Haines, Maxie Rosenbloom, Ben Lyon, Morton Downey and Joan Blondell waiting to begin a radio broadcast from the Stage Door Canteen (1943)

The Stage Door Canteen was an entertainment venue for American and Allied servicemen that operated in the Broadway theatre district of New York City throughout World War II. Founded by the American Theatre Wing (ATW) in 1942, the entertainers were largely unpaid; volunteering their talents as a way of supporting the morale of American troops during the war. Several women in leadership with the ATW played a critical role in establishing the Stage Door Canteen, including actress Nedda Harrigan and ATW co-founders Louise Heims Beck and Antoinette Perry. The canteen opened March 2, 1942 and operated seven nights a week in the previously unoccupied Little Club under the 44th Street Theatre at 216 West 44th Street in Manhattan.

The official estimate of attendance on the canteen's opening night was 1,250, with 200 "actresses of varying importance" as hostesses and 75 "'name' actors" as busboys.

The canteen's popularity led to the establishment of other canteens including Philadelphia, Washington, D.C., Cleveland, Hollywood, San Francisco, and elsewhere throughout the United States as well as London and Paris.

== Services ==
In addition to shows, the canteen offered off-duty military personnel opportunities to unwind in various ways, including dancing with hostesses and female entertainers, eating, and writing letters home. Food was provided free. Between 5 p.m. and midnight daily, the canteen served 200 gallons of coffee, and 5,000 cigarettes were smoked.

== In media ==
The original Stage Door Canteen inspired a CBS Radio series (1942–45) and a 1943 film. The film was made by RKO Pathe Studios, using a replica of the New York venue on the studio's Culver City, California, site.

The film This Is the Army (1943) and the Broadway play from which it was adapted include a scene set at the Stage Door Canteen. During that scene, Earl Oxford sang the song "I Left My Heart at the Stage Door Canteen" in both versions. The song "speaks of the fleeting love that many of the men felt when they had to leave the canteen, never to see these beautiful women again." The most popular recorded version of the song was made by Sammy Kaye and his orchestra, with Don Cornell singing. It reached No. 2 on the Billboard chart.

== Partial list of performers and public speakers who volunteered at the Stage Door Canteen ==
=== A-B ===
- Ruth Aarons
- Brian Aherne
- Vanoye Aixens
- Frank Albanese
- Ellen Albertini Dow
- Judith Allen
- Pauline Alpert
- Adrienne Ames
- Elaine Anderson Steinbeck
- Eve Arden
- Amy Arnell
- Don Arrès
- Jean-Pierre Aumont
- Lauren Bacall
- Jim Backus
- Pearl Bailey
- Kenny Baker
- Rose Bampton
- Tallulah Bankhead
- Billy Banks
- Margaret Bannerman
- Joe Baque
- Irina Baronova
- Robert R. Barry
- Diana Barrymore
- Ethel Barrymore Colt
- James Barton
- James K. Baxter
- Frank Behrens
- Ralph Bellamy
- Constance Bennett
- Milton Berle
- Pauline Betz
- Arthur Blake
- Joan Blondell
- Ray Bolger
- Margaret Bonds
- Victor Borge
- Ruthanna Boris
- Betty Brewer
- Berry Brothers
- Betty Bryant
- Norman Budd
- Billie Burke
- Charles Butterworth

=== C ===
- Maureen Cannon
- Una Mae Carlisle
- John Carradine
- Earl Carroll's Revue
- Sid Catlett
- Stanley Catron
- Ethel Cave-Cole
- Marguerite Chapman
- Carol Channing
- Lucia Chase
- George Church
- Harry Clark
- Tiny Clark
- Montgomery Clift
- Madeleine Clive
- Imogene Coca
- Grant Code
- Olga Coelho
- Eddie Cole
- Jack Cole
- Emil Coleman and His Orchestra
- Blanche Collins
- Jack Collins
- Ted Collins
- Jerry Colonna
- Betty Comden
- Perry Como
- Frances Comstock
- Walter Compton
- The Condos Brothers
- Billy Conn
- Irving Conn
- Nadine Conner
- Ann Connolly
- Ray Conniff
- The Continental Trio
- Melville Cooper
- John Frederick Coots
- George Copeland
- Peggy Corday
- Irwin Corey
- Ann Corio
- Irene Corlett
- Katherine Cornell
- Diosa Costello
- William Cottrell
- Alan Courtney
- Diane Courtney
- Herbert Cowans
- Jeanne Coyne
- The Cresta Blanca Carnival
- Cyril Critchlow
- Harold Cromer
- Bob Cronin and his NBC orchestra
- Roy Cropper
- Milton Cross
- Margaret Cuddy
- Xavier Cugat
- Marion Cumbo
- Frank Cunkle

=== D ===
- Donald Dame
- Lili Damita
- Danny Daniels
- Helene Daniels
- Les Damon
- Emery Darcy
- Jeanne Darrell
- Colette D'Arville
- Howard da Silva
- Bette Davis
- Evelyn Daw
- Martha Deane
- Deep River Boys
- Carol Deis
- Albert Dekker
- Jack De Leon
- The DeMarco Sisters
- Jacques de Menasce
- Clark Dennis
- Anita de Palma
- Clarence Derwent
- Romolo de Spirito
- Ragini Devi
- Annamary Dickey
- Artella Dickson
- Muriel Dickson
- Adam and Jane Di Gatano
- Tommy Dix
- Lee Dixon
- Doris Doe
- Bill Doggett
- Anton Dolin
- Uncle Don
- Doris Doree
- Jimmy Dorsey
- Tommy Dorsey
- Larry Douglas
- Helen Dowdy
- Jessica Dragonette
- Alfred Drake
- Ruth Draper
- Vernon Duke
- Ralph Dumke
- Katherine Dunham
- Artie Dunn
- Jack Dunphy
- Bob Dupont
- Jack Durant
- Ed Durlacher
- Eleanor Durkin

=== E-F ===
- Ed East
- Dan Eckley
- Ted Eddy and his Orchestra
- Dorothy Edwards
- Eddie Edwards
- Joan Edwards
- Kent Edwards
- Leo Edwards
- Penny Edwards
- Maurice Eisenberg
- Duke Ellington
- Leonard Elliott
- Edwina Eustis Dick
- Nanette Fabray
- José Ferrer
- Lynn Fontanne

=== G-H ===
- Betty Garrett
- Lillian Gish
- Benny Goodman
- Dolores Gray
- Adolph Green
- Mitzi Green
- Uta Hagen
- Helen Hayes
- Hildegarde
- Tiny Hill Orchestra
- Alfred Hitchcock
- Judy Holliday
- Celeste Holm
- Libby Holman
- Miriam Hopkins
- Lena Horne
- Laurel Hurley

=== I-K ===
- José Iturbi
- Chubby Jackson
- Dean Jagger
- George Jessel
- Irene Jordan
- Chandra Kaly and His Dancers
- William Kapell
- Maria Karnilova
- Danny Kaye
- Sammy Kaye

=== L-M ===
- Bert Lahr
- Carole Landis
- Betty Lawford
- Gertrude Lawrence
- Bert Lee
- Gypsy Rose Lee
- Oscar Levant
- Ethel Levey
- Cappy Lewis
- Liberace
- Beatrice Lillie
- Alfred Lunt
- Dwight Marfield
- George Marsh
- Mary Martin
- Catherine Mastice
- Ethel Merman
- Maria Montez

=== N-O ===
- Cornelia Otis Skinner

=== P-R ===
- Vincent Price
- John Raitt
- Gregory Ratoff
- Marisa Regules
- Paul Robeson

=== S-T ===
- Hazel Scott
- Gloria Swanson
- Akim Tamiroff
- Georgie Tapps
- Marilyn Taylor Gleason
- Jean Tennyson
- Joyce Terry
- Kay Thompson
- Lawrence Tibbett
- Sophie Tucker
- Frank Tuohy
- Kay Twomey

=== U-W ===
- Fred Uttal
- Margaret Valdi Curtis
- Vivian Vance
- Astrid Varnay
- Nancy Walker
- Ethel Waters
- Bert Wheeler
- June Winters
- Shelley Winters
- Barry Wood
- Peggy Wood
- Barbara Woodell
- Ilene Woods
- Monty Woolley
- WQXR Symphony Orchestra
- Betty Wragge
- Sonja Wronkow
- Jane Wyman
- Keenan Wynn
- Nan Wynn

=== X-Z ===
- Ben Yost
- Roland Young
- Henny Youngman
- Alexander Zakin
- Don Zelaya
- Vera Zorina
- George Zoritch

== See also ==
- Hollywood Canteen
