= Stump =

Stump may refer to:

- Tree stump, the rooted remains of a felled tree
- Stump (cricket), one of three small wooden posts which the fielding team attempt to hit with the ball

== Places ==
- Stump, Kentucky, an unincorporated community in the United States
- Stump Lake, a lake in British Columbia, Canada
- Stump Mountain, a rock peak in Mac. Robertson Land, Antarctica
- Stump River, tributary of the Pigeon River in Minnesota, United States
- Stump Rock, a rock in King George Bay, South Shetland Islands, Antarctica
- St Botolph's Church, Boston, Lincolnshire, England, known as "The Stump"

== People ==
- Stump (surname)
- James "Stump" Cross, of Stump and Stumpy, American dance performers during the 1930s-50s
- Stump Edington (1891–1969), American baseball player of the early 20th century
- Stump Evans (1904–1928), American jazz saxophonist from the early 20th century
- Stump Merrill (born 1944), American baseball manager
- Stump Mitchell (born 1959), American football player and coach
- Stump Monroe, drummer of the Scottish rock band The Almighty
- Stump Weidman (1861–1905), American baseball player during the 19th century

== Medicine ==
- Prostatic stromal tumour of uncertain malignant potential, a tumor of the prostate
- Smooth muscle tumor of uncertain malignant potential, a uterine tumor
- The remains of a limb after amputation

== Other ==
- Stump (game), also called hammerschlagen
- Stump (band), a band from Cork, Ireland and London, England
- Stump (drawing), an artists' drawing tool made of rolled paper
- Clussexx Three D Grinchy Glee (born 1998), 2009 "Best In Show" winner at the Westminster Dog Show, nicknamed Stump
- USS Stump (DD-978), a Spruance-class destroyer
- A coastal landform which forms when a stack (geology) is eroded

== See also ==
- Stump v. Sparkman, United States Supreme Court decision on judicial immunity
- Stump Pond (disambiguation)
- Stump speech
- Stumpy (disambiguation)
- Stumped (disambiguation)
- Stumpwm, an X window manager written in Common Lisp
- Stomp (disambiguation)
