= Henry "Crip" Heard =

American dancer (1924–1991)

- Born: Henry Heard; November 11, 1924; Memphis, Tennessee, United States
- Died: September 11, 1991 (aged 66); Chicago, Illinois, United States
- Occupations: Dancer, clerk

Henry "Crip" Heard (November 11, 1924 – September 11, 1991) was an American professional dancer who appeared mostly in Black vaudeville theaters and nightclubs during the late 1940s and 50s. What distinguished Heard from nearly all his peers was that he was a double amputee, dancing with only one leg and one arm. And lacking a sufficient stump for wearing an artificial leg, he walked using a crutch that he danced both with and without.

== Early life ==
Henry "Crip" Heard was born on November 11, 1924, in Memphis, Tennessee. Heard became a professional dancer at around age thirteen. In his late teens or early twenties, he lost his right arm and right leg near his home in Memphis, where a train hit the automobile in which he was riding.

== Career ==
In his mid twenties, Heard appeared in the 1949 film Boarding House Blues, a black-cast musical comedy. This film starred Moms Mabley as a struggling boarding house proprietor whose tenants rallied to save their home by putting on a show. The film featured performances by black entertainers including Dusty Fletcher, the Berry Brothers, Lucky Millinder, and Una Mae Carlisle. Heard appeared in a two-minute dance sequence, one of the few surviving video recordings of his work. Heard later appeared (possibly in 1951) on the television series You Asked for It in a four-minute performance, during which he did tap dance, the rumba, and the boogie-woogie.

Heard was not the only physically disabled African-American artist, nor even the only one-legged black professional dancer of his time. Clayton "Peg Leg" Bates, for example, had a long career including dancing twice for the King and Queen of England in the 1930s and appearing 19 times on The Ed Sullivan Show during the 1950s and 60s. A 1955 issue of Jet magazine had a photo of Bates and Heard together, "taking to the air with ease, [tossing] aside their peg and crutch to show their agility during a backstage get-together at the Chicago Theater."

Heard faced many challenges as he traveled about America performing for audiences during the Jim Crow era. One example came in 1959, when Heard was in Atlanta, Georgia preparing to go to Canada for an Easter engagement; a gunman robbed him of approximately $1,000 in cash and jewelry. In 1960, Heard had a bad fall, possibly as the result of a stroke, breaking several bones. This may have been the end of his professional dance career.

He had retired from dancing for a living by 1971, when a newspaper article reported that he was working in a clerical position, driving his own car, living independently at home in Chicago, and interested in helping people with disabilities, although he was still appearing occasionally in nightclubs as late as 1986 when he appeared on a revue on Chicago's south side. Heard asserted that disabled people make great employees, partly because they are eager to work. Critical of the minimally rewarding work available via charitable organizations such as Goodwill Industries, Heard wanted to see more training programs in the private sector, saying that, "There are thousands of perfectly healthy people holding down big paying jobs that could be done as well or better by the handicapped. All they need is the training." Heard was disappointed that the only work serving the disabled community that he could find was as an unpaid volunteer, but he continued with it. In 1975, a Chicago newspaper praised Heard, describing him as, "a clerk in the office of the 34th Ward Bureau of Sanitation, [who] has turned his handicap into an asset. This week he is sponsoring a dinner for handicapped youngsters at Illinois Research hospital."

== Death and legacy ==
When Heard died in 1991, the Illinois legislature recognized his death.
