= Robert Sour =

American composer (1905–1985)

- Born: October 31, 1905; New York City, U.S.
- Died: March 6, 1985 (aged 79); New York City, U.S.
- Occupations: Composer; lyricist; executive
- Years active: 1929–1970
- Spouses: Jane Erstein; Barbara Scofield
- Children: 4

President of Broadcast Music Incorporated
- In office 1966–1968

Robert B. Sour (October 31, 1905 – March 6, 1985) was an American lyricist and composer, and the president of Broadcast Music Incorporated (BMI).

== Career ==
Sour's songwriting career began in 1929. Working with lyricists Edward Heyman and Frank Eyton and composer Johnny Green, Sour wrote the lyrics to the ballad "Body and Soul" from the 1930 revue, Three's A Crowd.

In partnership with Una Mae Carlisle (1915–1956), he also composed lyrics for the song "Walkin' by the River", which became a radio hit as sung by Syliva Froos (1927–2004) in 1941. Ella Fitzgerald recorded "Walkin' by the River" for Decca Records, with Leroy Kirkland directing the orchestra. Benny Carter also recorded "Walkin", with Carlisle on vocals. Sour and Carlisle also partnered to write and compose, Coffee and Cakes, recorded twice in 1941 on Bluebird Records. Carlisle was the vocalist for the first recording. Frances Wayne was the vocalist with Sam Donahue and His Orchestra performing on the second recording.

Sour composed music and lyrics for both film and theater. He was the lyricist for the Broadway revue Sing for Your Supper (1939, Adelphi Theatre). Partnering with Henry Manners and Helen Bliss, the trio wrote the songs "Twitterpated" and "Thumper's Song" for the soundtrack of the Walt Disney Productions animated feature Bambi (1942).

In 1940, Sour worked for Broadcast Music as its lyrics editor, and by 1966 had risen through company ranks to become BMI's president. Two years later he had become the company's vice chairman and was instrumental in establishing BMI's musical theater workshop He retired in 1970.

== Personal life ==
Sour was born in New York City on October 31, 1905. He was married to Geraldine Scofield Sour, and had previously been married to the former Jane Erstein.

Sour was one of the jurors in the murder trial of Eddie Lee Mays, who in 1963 became the last man executed in New York.

Sour died in New York City on March 6, 1985, at the age of 79.
