= OrCam device =

Portable, artificial vision device

OrCam
- Type: Private company
- Industry: Health, Assistive technology
- Founded: 2010; 16 years ago Jerusalem
- Founder: Ziv Aviram; Amnon Shashua
- Headquarters: Har Hotzvim, Jerusalem, Israel
- Key people: Prof Amnon Shashua (Chairman and CTO) Ziv Aviram (President and CEO) Dr. Yonatan Wexler (Executive VP of R&D)
- Products: OrCam MyEye and OrCam MyReader
- Number of employees: 394 (2021)
- Website: http://www.orcam.com/

OrCam devices such as OrCam MyEye are portable, artificial vision devices that allow visually impaired people to understand text and identify objects through audio feedback, describing what they are unable to see.

Reuters described an important part of how it works as "a wireless smartcamera" which, when attached outside eyeglass frames, can read and verbalize text, and also supermarket barcodes. This information is converted to spoken words and entered "into the user’s ear." Face-recognition is also part of OrCam's feature set.

== Devices ==
OrCam Technologies Ltd has created three devices; OrCam MyEye 2.0, OrCam MyEye 1, and OrCam MyReader.

OrCam My Eye 2.0:

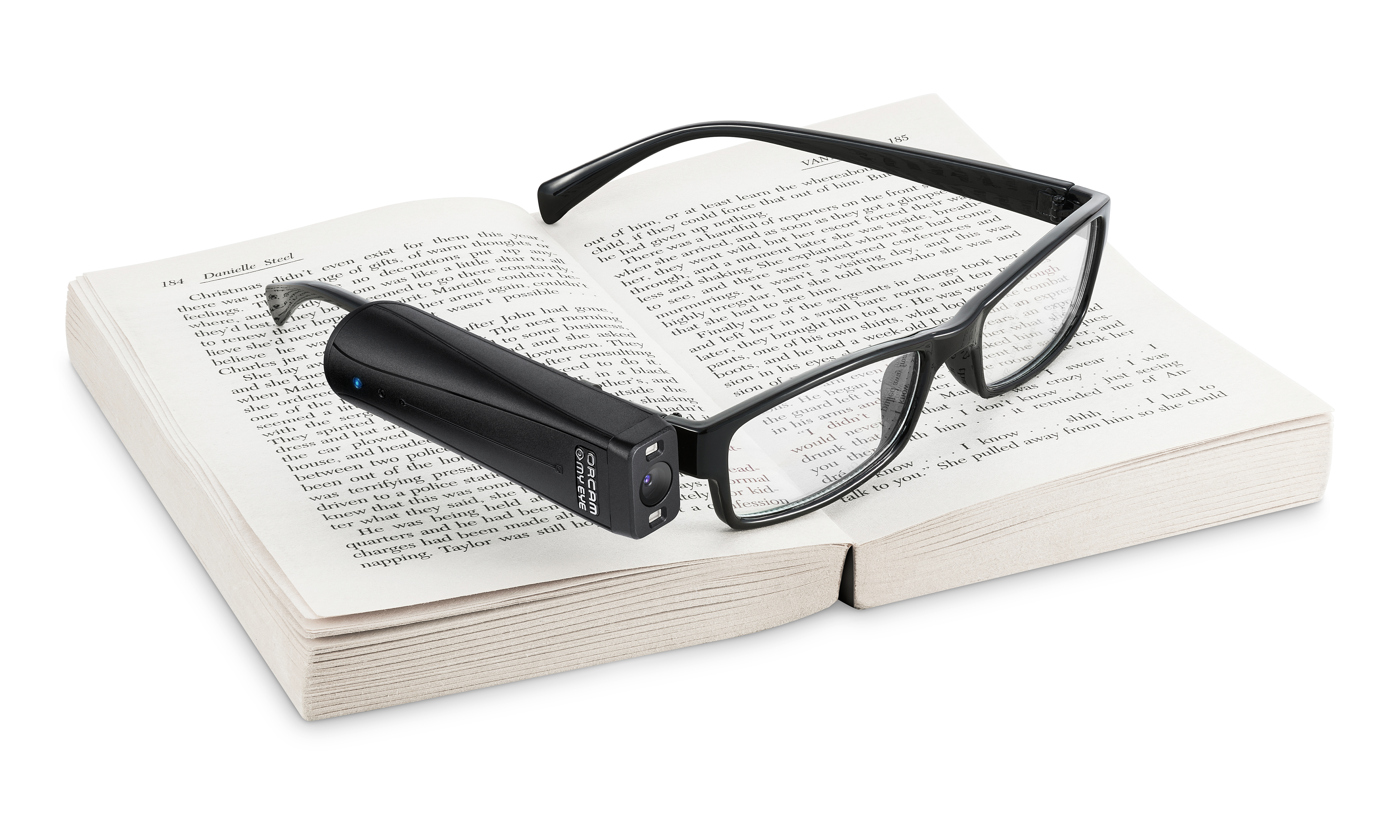
OrCam MyEye 2.0

- OrCam debuted the second-generation model, the OrCam MyEye 2.0 in December 2017.
- About the size of a finger, the MyEye 2.0 is battery-powered, and has been compressed into a self-contained device.
- The device snaps onto any eyeglass frame magnetically.
- Orcam 2.0 is small and light (22.5 grams/0.8 ounces) with functionality to restore independence to the visually impaired.
- It comes in two versions. The basic model can read text, and a more advanced one adds features such as face recognition and barcode reading.
- As of July 2023, the retail cost is between $4000 and $6000 (USD).

== Clinical Studies ==
JAMA Ophthalmology: In 2016 JAMA Ophthalmology conducted a study involving 12 legally blind participants to evaluate the usefulness of a portable artificial vision device (OrCam) for patients with low vision. The results showed that the OrCam device improved the patient's ability to perform tasks simulating those of daily living, such as reading a message on an electronic device, a newspaper article or a menu.

Wills Eye: Wills Eye was a clinical study designed to measure the impact of the OrCam device on the quality of life of patients with End-stage Glaucoma. The conclusion was that OrCam, a novel artificial vision device using a mini-camera mounted on eyeglasses, allowed legally blind patients with end-stage glaucoma to read independently, subsequently improving their quality of life.

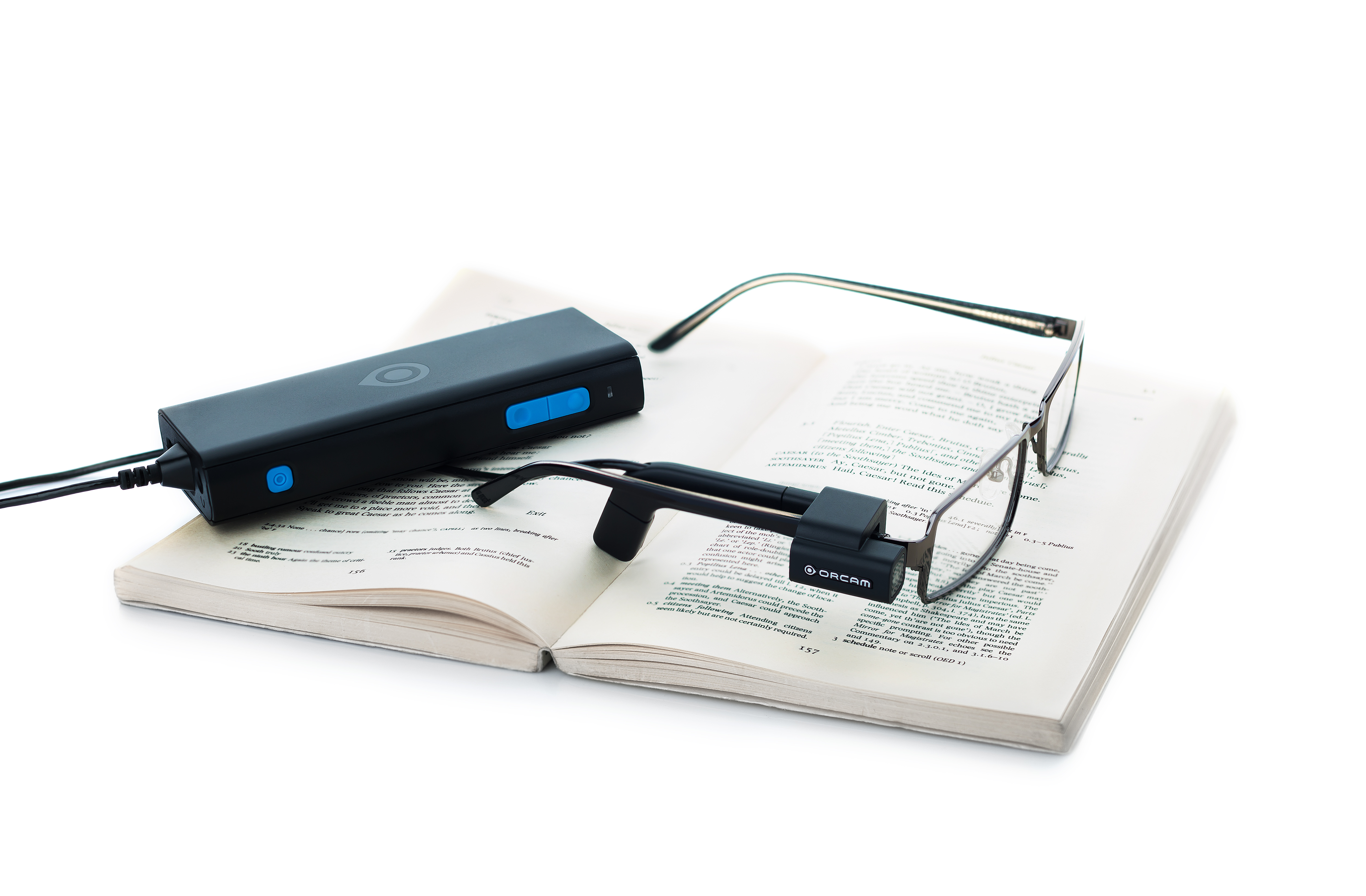
OrCam90

== Employee testing ==
The New York Times described how a pre-release OrCam device was used by a Coloboma-impaired employee of the device's developer in 2013 for grocery shopping. It was the small size of the prototype rather than the functionality that gave her added mobility in an Israeli store's aisles.

Added life-enhancement was described: "to both recognize and speak .. bus numbers .. traffic lights."

== Social aspects ==
In contrast to an early version of Google Glass, which "failed ... because .. Glass wearers were ..mocked", early OrCam devices used designs that "clip unobtrusively on your shirt or perhaps your belt."

In addition, it does not record sounds or images, what was called "the privacy puzzle that stumped Google.

One 2018 technology reviewer wrote that he wished it had a headphone jack "so it would be less disruptive in places where others are working." An attempt was made to use bone conduction.

== USA introduction ==
In 2018 a team headed by New York Assemblyman Dov Hikind introduced use of OrCam devices to ten individuals screened for what he termed "new Israeli technology that really makes a difference to the blind."

Although not the first USA success, it was more focused than a publicly funded project that was authorized in 2016 by a California government agency. Also in 2016 the Chicago Lighthouse for the Blind demonstrated its use.

== Technology ==
In the area of hardware, miniaturization has been quite important, but one major area, software, was mentioned by Assemblyman Hikind, and reported by The Times of Israel is the "AI-driven algorithms" that "reports .. how many people are in a room.

In addition to reading printed text, it can also aid in "seeing" what is on a television or computer screen. Although OrCam can't help with handwritten information, it can reuse information, the basis of recognizing "US currency, and even faces."

=== Features ===
While early language support was for English, French, German, Hebrew and Spanish, others now available include Danish, Dutch, Finnish, Italian, Norwegian, Portuguese and Swedish.

== History ==
OrCam Technologies Ltd was founded in 2010 by Professor Amnon Shashua and Ziv Aviram. Before co-founding OrCam, the two in 1999 co-founded Mobileye, an Israeli company that develops vision-based advanced driver-assistance systems (ADAS) providing warnings for collision prevention and mitigation, which was acquired by Intel for $15.3 billion in 2017. OrCam launched OrCam MyEye in 2013 after years of development and testing, and began selling it commercially in 2015.

In its early years, the company raised $22 million, $6 million of which came from Intel Capital. By 2014, Intel, which was also investing in Google Glass, had invested $15 million in Orcam. In March 2017, OrCam had raised $41 million in capital, making it worth $600 million.

=== Marketing ===
One outcome of initial marketing in the USA was that they "reached a deal with the California Department of Rehabilitation, ...qualifying blind and visually impaired state residents."

== OrCam Technologies Ltd ==
OrCam Technologies Ltd. is the Israeli-based company producing these OrCam devices, which are wearable artificial intelligence space. The company develops and manufactures assistive technology devices for individuals who are visually impaired, partially sighted, blind, print disabilities, or have other disabilities. OrCam headquarters is located in Jerusalem, operating under the company name OrCam Technologies Ltd.

OrCam has over 150 employees, is headquartered in Jerusalem, and has offices in New York, Toronto, and London.

== Awards ==
- 2018 Last Gadget Standing Winner
- 2018 CES Innovation Awards Honoree in Accessible Tech
- 2017 NAIDEX Innovation Award
- 2016 Louise Braille Corporate Recognition Award
- 2016 Silmo-d-Or Award
