= Stumpy =

Stumpy may refer to:

As a nickname or stage name:

- Charles Bartlett (American football) (1899–1965), American college football player
- Stumpy Cromer (died 2013), American comedian and dancer, of the Stump and Stumpy entertainment duo (see below)
- Eddie Hartman, the first Stumpy in the Stump and Stumpy dance/comedy/acting duo of the mid-1930s to the 1950s
- Stumpy Malarkey, one of the founders of the Gopher Gang, a New York City street gang
- Steve Thomas (ice hockey) (born 1963), retired National Hockey League player and current assistant coach
- Stumpy Thomason (1906–1989), American National Football League quarterback
- Herb Turner (Australian footballer) (1921–2002), Australian rules footballer

Entertainment:

- Stumpy (album), released by the New Zealand band Tall Dwarfs in 1996
- Stumpy, a character in the Western Rio Bravo (film), played by Walter Brennan
- a character in Willow and Stumpy, British animated television series
- Stumpy, a fictional character from the animated series Super Duper Bunny League

Other uses:

- Stumpy (mascot), official mascot for the 2011 Cricket World Cup
- Common term for the Australian lizard Tiliqua rugosa
- Stumpy (tree), a cherry tree in Washington, DC.
