= Ariel Darvasi =

Chilean-born Israeli academic

- אריאל דרבסי
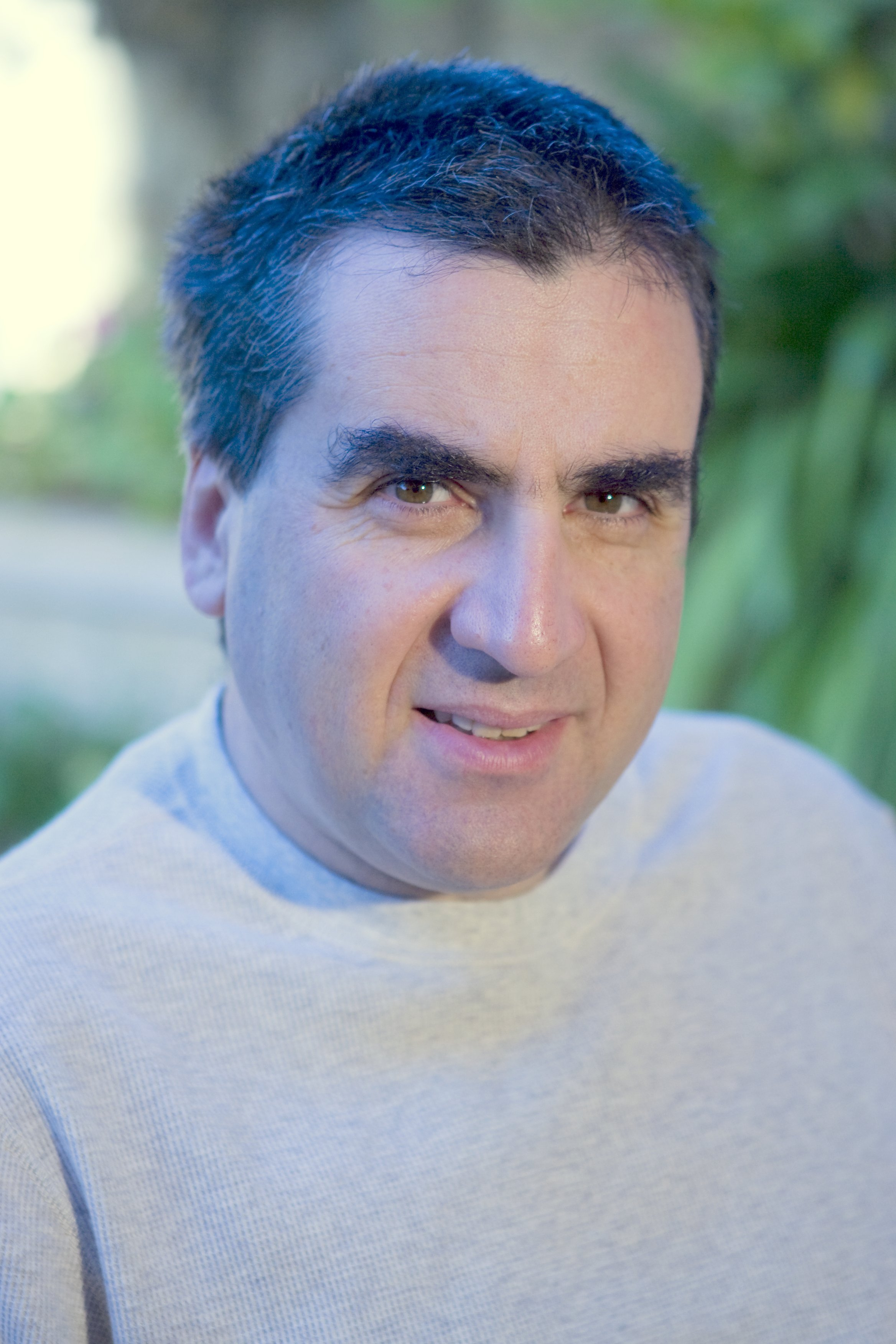
- Born: February 17, 1962; Santiago de Chile
- Died: September 28, 2018 (aged 56)
- Scientific career
- Fields: Genetics
- Institutions: The Hebrew University of Jerusalem

Ariel Darvasi (Hebrew: אריאל דרבסי; February 17, 1962 – September 28, 2018) was a Professor of Genetics and former Head of Life Sciences Studies and Vice Dean of the Faculty of Sciences at The Hebrew University of Jerusalem.

== Biography ==
Ariel Darvasi was born in Santiago de Chile. At the age of 10 his family moved to Israel and settled in Jerusalem.

Darvasi obtained his BSc degree (with honors) in Biology and Computer Science in 1988, and his MSc degree (with honors) and his PhD degree (summa cum laude) in Genetics from The Hebrew University of Jerusalem, under the supervision of Moshe Soller. Subsequently, he conducted post-doctoral research at The University of Paris.

As a young scientist he won the Landau Prize. in 1999, one of Israel's highest honors for sciences.

Between 2006 and 2009 Darvasi was Head of Genetics Studies at the Hebrew University of Jerusalem, and then Head of the entire Life Sciences curriculum until 2012. From 2012 to 2016 Darvasi served as Vice Dean of the Faculty of Sciences of The Hebrew University.

== Academic career ==
Darvasi published over 100 scientific articles. His research can be divided into 5 major themes:

- The theoretical basis of gene mapping. The early studies of Darvasi were aimed to develop experimental and computational strategies for the identification of genes affecting complex traits. Several of the strategies developed by Darvasi are widely used by many geneticists all over the world till this day.
- The genetic basis of chronic pain. Darvasi, in collaboration with Marshall Devor, studied the genetic basis of chronic pain. Using a mouse model they identified a novel gene affecting predisposition to chronic pain. Their findings were shown to affect chronic pain in humans as well.
- The Genetic basis of schizophrenia. Adopting experimental strategies he developed, Darvasi discovered one of the strongest genetic associations at the time (published in the American Journal of Human Genetics, 2002) between a gene and predisposition to schizophrenia. More recently, he was part of a large international consortium that discovered over 100 genes affecting schizophrenia (published in Nature 2014).
- DNA Forensics. Darvasi developed experimental and computational strategies in DNA forensics. He holds a US patent for the identification of a suspect's DNA in a scene of crime where a mixture of DNA from several individuals is present.
- The evolutionary basis of human behavior. Darvasi's current field of research is the evolutionary basis of human behavior – he teaches a unique course in this topic at The Hebrew University. His interest is in mind mechanisms that drive evolutionary beneficial behaviors. In this context he developed the "Boss Theory", an evolutionary driven theory that aims to describe a conceptual framework for conscious and unconscious mind processes.

== Business career ==
Along with teaching and research, Darvasi founded IDgene, a biotechnology company that studied the genetic basis of common diseases (such as diabetes, asthma, cancer, schizophrenia and many others) as a mean to discover novel therapies. In 1999 the company raised over US$15 million from various venture capital firms, including world leaders such as Apax Partners. At its peak, IDgene employed 50 employees in its Jerusalem central facilities.

In 2004 the company ceased formal operations and all intellectual property was transferred to the Hebrew University of Jerusalem. Over the years, Darvasi also co-founded several other biotechnology companies in Israel and the US.

In March 2017, Darvasi was under investigation by the SEC (Security Exchange Commission) for suspicion of alleged insider trading of Mobileye shares. The case was settled with a fine and no conviction of any wrongdoing
