= The Chamber Music Society of Lower Basin Street =

The Chamber Music Society of Lower Basin Street is a hot-jazz (dixieland) radio program that began on the Blue Network on February 11, 1940.

== Format ==
The program was created and hosted by NBC staff announcer Gene Hamilton, as a tongue-in-cheek satire of highbrow symphonic broadcasts hosted by Milton Cross. Instead of Cross's dignified commentary introducing each orchestral selection, "Dr. Gino Hamilton" would introduce a traditional hot-jazz melody, peppering his remarks with slang: "The work opens with a tailgate sludge-pump smear and from there on is, to use a technical musical expression, solid in the gutter -- er, groove... a moss-covered classic that's old enough to vote!"

The music was performed by two house bands. Henry Levine, a former member of the Original Dixieland Jazz Band, led an eight-member dixieland combo; Paul Laval (later Lavalle, to avoid confusion with the French wartime traitor Paul Laval) led a 10-piece woodwind ensemble, with arrangements employing oboe, bassoon, and French horn. Each broadcast featured a vocalist: Dinah Shore was discovered on the Basin Street program; she was succeeded in turn by New York-based vocalists Diane Courtney, Dodie O'Neill, Dixie Mason, Linda Keene, Loulie Jean Norman, and Lena Horne.

Gene Hamilton invited guest artists to appear on Lower Basin Street, including Benny Goodman, Count Basie, W. C. Handy, Bobby Hackett, Lead Belly, Lionel Hampton, Jelly Roll Morton, Sidney Bechet, and Hazel Scott, among other famous names in the jazz world. Many leading musicians were fans of the show, and kept in touch with Hamilton by telephone to arrange guest shots. An early guest was Paul Nero, hot violinist -- in reality, Kurt Polnariov of the Pittsburgh Symphony.

Much of the low-key humor in Lower Basin Street was provided by scriptwriter Welbourne (Web) Kelley. Some of Kelley's witticisms, as delivered by the deadpan Dr, Gino, were often greeted with laughs and groans by the musicians on the bandstand. Kelley frequently kidded the men in the band, whom he referred to as "Dr. Henry Levine and his Eight Dixieland Draftees... drafted during the Civil War" or "Dr. Henry Levine and his Dixieland Philharmonic of eight illustrious jerks." Kelley also welcomed individual musicians: "We'd like you to take particular note of the middle chorus, played on a sludge pump by Prof. Fletch 'Bye Bye Blues' Philburn, Jr. He is our new tailgate trombonist." Kelley was especially fond of awful puns. When boogie-woogie pianist and historian (Mr.) Sharon Pease took to the keyboard to play an original composition, Hamilton prompted the pianist with: "Music, Maestro... Pease." Web Kelley reluctantly left the program in late 1941, when he became a scriptwriter for U. S. Navy radio programs.

A regular feature of Lower Basin Street was the "intermission commentator," who would either deliver a monologue or be interviewed by Dr. Gino at the program's halfway point. Sometimes it would be a musician or musicologist like the blind, tongue-in-cheek classical pianist Alec Templeton; or a faux-pedantic lecturer like Will S. Scott, radio humorist; or just an enthusiastic hot-jazz fan like Martin Hellman, captain of the New York Sanitation Department's Garbage Scow #14. Hellman became a favorite and made frequent appearances, as late as 1952. One 1943 session had Jackie Gleason, then a struggling nightclub comedian, as the intermission commentator. He delivered a comic monologue about a girl who ran off with a trumpet player, and collected $350 for the appearance. As Gleason biographer W. J. Weatherby related, "There were so many phone calls praising it as the funniest program listeners had ever heard that Jackie was invited back. 'Wait till I'm that desperate again,' he said."

== Broadcast history ==
The Chamber Music Society of Lower Basin Street began as a sustaining (unsponsored) half-hour feature on NBC's Sunday-afternoon schedule (4:30 p.m. Eastern time). So many listeners wrote to the network expressing approval—and asking to see the show in person—that in October 1940 NBC gave Lower Basin Street an unsponsored, Monday-evening slot in its primetime schedule. Fans protested vigorously when the network sometimes pre-empted the program and even announced plans to cancel it. As Variety commented: "NBC has twice decided to fold the series, but each time has continued it in response to listener agitation." Hamilton mentioned this off-again, on-again status on the air: "Greetings, music lovers, and if we've been canceled again and you're not hearing this, please don't tell us." Hamilton was forced to leave the program in late 1941, when NBC reassigned him to its production department. He was replaced as host by announcer Jack ("Dr. Giacomo") McCarthy and then by the very man the series was burlesquing, Milton Cross.

As a sideline to the radio show, maestro Paul Lavalle brought a Chamber Music Society of Lower Basin Street stage revue to the Roxy theater in New York City, with radio host Milton Cross as master of ceremonies, beginning on February 3, 1943. Publicity photos for the engagement showed the orchestra members in period costumes and wearing powdered wigs.

After two years of running as a sustaining show, Lower Basin Street found a sponsor: the Andrew Jergens Company, manufacturer of health and beauty aids. With a budget enhanced by Jergens, the program could now afford more "name" guest stars, among them Victor Borge, The Merry Macs, Danny Thomas, Connee Boswell, The Andrews Sisters, Chico Marx, and Milton Berle. They would engage in scripted banter with host Milton Cross. The format drifted away from Hamilton's original, intimate concept of hot-jazz jam sessions. Henry Levine's dixieland band was dismissed, and Paul Lavalle now fronted a big band. The show became a loud, brassy jamboree staged for large crowds. The Jergens advertising agency Lennen & Mitchell kept tampering with the format, and the program took a sharp nosedive. One of the ad agency's desperate innovations was changing the very name of the show to Basin Street Fun in November 1943. As Billboard reported during the show's last weeks: "It is said that the show, which has had several format changes in the past year, is a dead duck. The show had a high Hooper [rating] as a sustainer, but failed to come thru once it went commercial and the basic idea, hot jazz and sophisticated comedy, was junked. Many program men say that if the show had been left as it was, a lively session of hot jazz, it would have stayed up with the leaders." The show left the air in October 1944, with Victor Borge guesting on the last two shows.

== Revivals ==
On March 13, 1950, series creator Gene Hamilton returned to radio, this time for the ABC network, with a new show, Dr. Gino's Musicale. Variety reviewed the audition recording and found it to be "a direct throwback" to Lower Basin Street, with "virtually the same format, the same beat, and the same musical director [Henry Levine]." NBC objected, on the grounds of possible plagiarism, but Hamilton asserted his claim as the format's originator. So much time had elapsed since Lower Basin Street's debut that NBC's legal staff wasn't sure who owned what, and finally settled with Hamilton. Dixieland music had become a nationwide craze in 1950, and NBC returned The Chamber Music Society of Lower Basin Street to its schedule on June 8 of that year, with "Dr. Gino Hamilton" returning to the microphone and "Dr. Henry Levine" back on the bandstand. The series aired as a summer replacement for Judy Canova's program.

NBC looked to its established radio properties for possible conversion to television series, and The Chamber Music Society of Lower Basin Street was on the list. To gauge public interest, Lower Basin Street was revived as a Saturday-night radio series on April 12, 1952, as an "information and education" program sponsored by the U. S. Army Reserve. Henry Levine's dixieland band returned with a new vocalist, Martha Lou Harp, and a new host, 23-year-old nightclub comedian Orson Bean. Bean caught the spirit of the series immediately, and read the script in the bemused tones of a stuffy college professor. The show's original scriptwriter, Web Kelley, was back with the show's trademark wisecracks and puns. (Questioning the inclusion of a saxophone in an arrangement, Dr. Bean muttered, "Is sax necessary?") Bean was fond of unscripted asides, and instead of "Bravo!" Bean would invoke "the Viennese expression, Hoch, hoch! Vom himmel hoch! ("High, high from the sky!")". NBC staff announcer Wayne Howell, in the same spirit, introduced the host as "Boston's half-baked Bean." The show's "intermission commentaries" at the halfway point were also retained for the 1952 series, with "Dr. Wayne Howell" assisting when needed.

The series did well enough for NBC to mount a live-TV special on June 15–5:30 on Sunday afternoon—with Bean, Levine, Harp, guest commentator Arthur Treacher, hot bagpiper Ross Gorman, and dancers Milton Kanen and Gene Myers. No kinescope recordings of the show are known to survive, and the special was not picked up as a series. The Lower Basin Street franchise came to an end.

In 1953 Gene Hamilton, the originator of the show, returned to NBC with his own hot-jazz radio program, Dr. Gino, airing on Saturday afternoons.

== Recordings and films ==
Beginning in November 1940, RCA Victor recorded albums of 78-rpm discs featuring The Chamber Music Society of Lower Basin Street. The comic liner notes were furnished by Web Kelley, who wrote the radio series. Each disc in the album would begin with "Dr. Gino" Hamilton introducing the selection, played by one of the two Lower Basin Street bands. The other side of the disc featured the other band. RCA re-released these records as late as the 1960s, emphasizing vocalists Dinah Shore or Lena Horne and deleting the commentaries.

The only surviving visual records of The Chamber Music Society of Lower Basin Street are four three-minute films produced for the Soundies film jukeboxes in 1941. All feature the Henry Levine "Dixieland Jazz Band," with vocals by Linda Keene in three of them.

== Listen to ==
- Five full episodes of The Chamber Music Society of Lower Basin Street
