= Boarding House Blues =

- Original film poster
- Directed by: Josh Binney
- Written by: Hal Seeger (writer)
- Produced by: E.M. Glucksman (producer)
- Starring: See below
- Cinematography: Sydney Zucker
- Production company: All-American News
- Release date: 1948
- Running time: 90 minutes
- Country: United States
- Language: English

Boarding House Blues is a 1948 American musical race film directed by Josh Binney which featured the first starring film role by Moms Mabley. It was the penultimate feature film of All-American News, a company that made newsreels about black Americans.

== Premise ==
Mom (Moms Mabley) runs a boarding house for struggling entertainers, similar to the situation decades earlier when Mabley had lived in a boarding house for black entertainers in Buffalo, New York.

When the boarding house is threatened with closure and all the tenants evicted due to non-payments, everyone gets together to put on a show to raise the money needed to save Mom and their home. The plot functions as a showcase for performance and comedy sketches and in the end enough money is raised to fend off the landlord.

== Legacy ==
The film was the first starring role for Mabley and showcased her "vaudeville-circuit comedy and captured her signature stances and expressions." The film was also one of the early iterations of Mabley's "Moms" persona.

In 1994, the National Film Theatre in London featured the film in their "A Separate Cinema" season, which focused on the pioneers of black cinema in the United States. The film was cited as an example of "subversive" low budget black cinema in the 1940s.

In 2022, the American Film Institute showed the film as part of the institute's "NYC's Postwar Film Renaissance" series.

== Cast ==
- Moms Mabley as Moms
- Dusty Fletcher as Dusty
- Marcellus Wilson as Jerry
- Marie Cooke as Lila Foster
- Augustus Smith as Norman Norman
- John D. Lee Jr. as Stanley
- Emory Richardson as Simon
- Harold Cromer as Moofty
- Sidney Easton as Boo Boo
- Freddie Robinson as Freddie
- John 'Spider Bruce' Mason as Boarders (with "company")
- John Riano as Steggy (the ape)
- Lucky Millinder as himself (bandleader)
- Una Mae Carlisle as herself (singer)
- Bull Moose Jackson as himself (singer)
- Warren Berry as One of Berry Brothers
- Nyas Berry as One of Berry Brothers
- Anistine Allen as herself (singer)
- Paul Breckenridge as himself (singer)
- James Cross as Stump of Stump and Stumpy
- Eddie Hartman as Stumpy of Stump and Stumpy
- Lee Norman as themselves
- 'Crip' Heard as himself (one-legged dancer)
- Edgar Martin as Joe

== Soundtrack ==
- John Mason and Company – "Gimme"
- The Berry Brothers – "You'll Never Know" (Written by Harry Warren, lyrics by Mack Gordon)
- Una Mae Carlisle – "Throw It out of Your Mind" (Written by Louis Armstrong and Billy Kyle)
- Una Mae Carlisle – "It Ain't Like That" (Written by Hot Lips Page)
- Stump and Stumpy – "We've Got Rhythm to Spare"
- Paul Breckenridge with Lucky Millinder band "We Slumber"
- Anistine Allen with Lucky Millinder band – "Let It Roll"
- Bull Moose Jackson with Lucky Millinder band – "Yes I Do"
