= Amnon Shashua =

Israeli computer scientist (born 1960)

- אמנון שעשוע
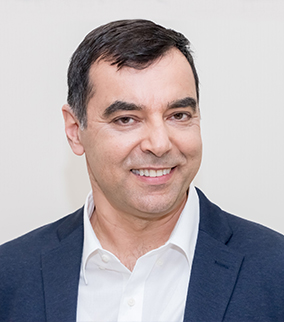
- Amnon Shashua in 2018
- Born: May 26, 1960 (age 66); Ramat Gan, Israel
- Education: Tel-Aviv University (BS) Weizmann Institute of Science (MS) Massachusetts Institute of Technology (PhD)
- Known for: Co-founding Mobileye and OrCam, advancements in AI and computer vision, philanthropy through the Shashua Family Foundation
- Awards: Kaye Innovation Award, Mifal HaPayis Landau Prize, Israeli Independence Day torch lighter, Electronic Imaging Scientist of the Year, Dan David Prize, Mobility Innovator Award, The Automotive Hall of Fame, MotorTrend's Software-Defined Vehicle Innovator Award, Israel Prize
- Scientific career
- Fields: Computer science Autonomous vehicles
- Workplaces: Hebrew University of Jerusalem
- Thesis: Geometry and photometry in 3D visual recognition (1993)
- Doctoral advisor: Shimon Ullman

Amnon Shashua (Hebrew: אמנון שעשוע; born May 26, 1960) is an Israeli computer scientist and entrepreneur, a professor of computer science at the Hebrew University of Jerusalem and co-founder and chief executive officer of the autonomous driving company Mobileye.

== Biography ==
Amnon Shashua was born in Ramat Gan, Israel, to parents of Iraqi origin. From a young age, he was fascinated with computers, a field that was in its early stages of development. He attended the ORT school in Givatayim for his early education in computer engineering.

Amnon Shashua received his B.Sc. in mathematics and computer science from Tel-Aviv University in 1985 and his M.Sc. in computer science in 1989 from the Weizmann Institute of Science under the supervision of Shimon Ullman. His Ph.D. in brain and cognitive sciences was received from the Massachusetts Institute of Technology (MIT), while working at the Artificial Intelligence Laboratory, in 1993; and his postdoctoral training under Tomaso Poggio at the center for biological and computational learning at MIT.

== Career ==
=== Academic ===
Shashua has been on the computer science faculty at the Hebrew University of Jerusalem since 1996. In 1999 he was appointed as an associate professor and in 2003 received full professorship. From 2002 to 2005 he was the head of the engineering and computer science school at the Hebrew University. Shashua has held the Sachs chair in computer science at the Hebrew University since 2007.

A computer vision researcher, Shashua was elected in 2026 to the US National Academy of Engineering (NAE) as an international member of its Class of 2026 for his contributions to computer vision and its application to autonomous driving technology.

=== Business ===
In 1995, Shashua founded CogniTens, which was sold to Hexagon AB in 2007. In 1999, Shashua co-founded Mobileye, a company that develops systems-on-chip and computer vision algorithms for driving assistance systems, as well as autonomous driving technology. On August 1, 2014, Mobileye launched its IPO on the NYSE which was the biggest Israeli IPO ever in the US raising approximately $1 billion at a market cap of $5.3 billion.

In 2010, Shashua co-founded OrCam, an Israeli company which launched an assistive device for the visually impaired based on computer vision capabilities. Globes reported in August 2026 that the company had lost most of its value since a 2021 funding round at a $1.5 billion valuation.

In August 2017, Intel acquired Mobileye for approximately $15.3 billion. Shashua became a senior vice president at Intel, in addition to his title of President and CEO of Mobileye. In 2017, he also co-founded AI21 Labs. In 2020, he was awarded the Dan David Prize for his work in Artificial Intelligence.

One Zero, a digital bank founded in 2019, is controlled by Shashua, who held a 63% stake as of March 2024.

In October 2022, Mobileye went public again, trading on the Nasdaq Stock Exchange with Shashua as its CEO.

In 2022, he co-founded Mentee Robotics with Shai Shalev-Shwartz and Lior Wolf to develop intelligent humanoid robots. In 2023, he was awarded Israel Prize in the category lifetime achievement and exceptional contribution to the nation.

In 2023, he founded AAI Technologies with Shai Shalev-Shwartz, Yoav Levine, Or Sharir, Noam Weiss, and Gal Benyamini. The company develops expert-based artificial intelligence (Expert AI) systems. In November 2025 Globes reported that the company, which is also referred to as doubleAI, had raised $200 million in a round led by Lightspeed Venture Partners at a valuation of about $1 billion.

In January 2026, Mobileye announced an agreement to acquire Mentee Robotics, which Shashua co-founded and chaired, for $900 million in cash and shares. Shashua recused himself from the approval of the deal by Mobileye’s board. The acquisition closed on February 3, 2026. Globes estimated that Shashua, who owned about 37.9% of Mentee, would receive about $341 million in cash and Mobileye shares.

In July 2026 Calcalist reported that Shashua intended to leave AI21 Labs and its board. On July 23, 2026, Mobileye announced that Shashua had informed its board that he intends to step down as chief executive once a successor is appointed; the board offered him the role of chairman.

== Philanthropy ==
Shashua, along with his family, has engaged in various philanthropic activities through the Shashua Family Foundation.

Shashua's wife, Anat Ramaty Shashua, is president of the Foundation as well as chairwoman of the Orr Shalom organization for children and youth at risk. Together, they also founded The Social Solidarity Foundation, a public benefit organization supported by the Shashua Family Foundation, that assists in the development and growth of small businesses in Israel. Their daughter, Inbar Shashua Bar-Nir, serves as chairwoman of the board.

As of 2024, Shashua and his family have donated approximately $60 million to various charitable causes, focusing on promoting economic opportunities and supporting underrepresented populations in Israel. These populations include ultra-Orthodox communities, Israeli-Arabs, women in STEM fields, and peripheral communities.

The Shashua Family Foundation has also funded scholarships at Tel Aviv University (TAU), his alma mater.

In response to the economic challenges posed by the COVID-19 pandemic, the family established the WE-19 program, a $35 million fund designed to support approximately 2,000 small businesses affected by the pandemic.

== Selected publications ==
- Shalev-Shwartz, S; Shammah, S; Shashua, A (2016). "Safe, multi-agent, reinforcement learning for autonomous driving". arXiv:1610.03295 [cs.AI].
- Shalev-Shwartz, S; Shammah, S; Shashua, A (2017). "On a formal model of safe and scalable self-driving cars". arXiv:1708.06374 [cs.RO].
- Shashua, A; Riklin-Raviv, T (2001). "The quotient image: Class-based re-rendering and recognition with varying illuminations". IEEE Transactions on Pattern Analysis and Machine Intelligence. 23 (2): 129–139. Bibcode:2001ITPAM..23..129S. doi:10.1109/34.908964.
- Ullman, S; Sha'ashua, A (1988). "Structural Saliency: The Detection of Globally Salient Structures using a Locally Connected Network". [1988 Proceedings] Second International Conference on Computer Vision. pp. 321–327. doi:10.1109/CCV.1988.590008. hdl:1721.1/6493. ISBN 0-8186-0883-8.
- Shashua, A; Hazan, T (2005). "Expectation maximization algorithms for conditional likelihoods". Proceedings of the 22nd international conference on Machine learning - ICML '05. pp. 792–799. doi:10.1145/1102351.1102451.
- Shashua, A; Gdalyahu, Y; Hayun, G (2004). "Pedestrian detection for driving assistance systems: Single-frame classification and system level performance". IEEE Intelligent Vehicles Symposium, 2004. pp. 1–6. doi:10.1109/IVS.2004.1336346. ISBN 0-7803-8310-9.
- Cohen, N; Sharir, O; Shashua, A (2015). "On the Expressive Power of Deep Learning: A Tensor Analysis". arXiv:1509.05009 [cs.NE].
- Shashua, A; Levin, A (2002). "Ranking with large margin principle: Two approaches". Advances in Neural Information Processing Systems. 15.
- Zass, R; Shashua, A (2008). "Probabilistic graph and hypergraph matching". 2008 IEEE Conference on Computer Vision and Pattern Recognition. pp. 1–8. doi:10.1109/CVPR.2008.4587500. ISBN 978-1-4244-2242-5.
- Dagan, E; Mano, O; Stein, GP; Shashua, A (2004). "Forward collision warning with a single camera". IEEE Intelligent Vehicles Symposium, 2004. pp. 37–42. doi:10.1109/IVS.2004.1336352. ISBN 0-7803-8310-9.
- Wolf, L; Shashua, A (2003). "Learning over sets using kernel principal angles". Journal of Machine Learning Research. 4: 913–931.

== See also ==
- Ziv Aviram
- Dov Moran
