= Valaida Snow =

American jazz musician (1904–1956)

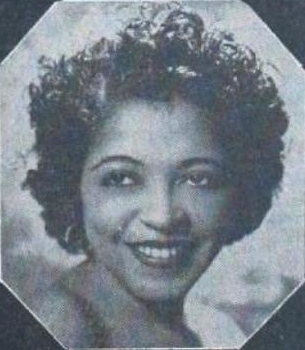
- Snow in a 1945 advertisement

Background information
- Born: June 2, 1904; Chattanooga, Tennessee, U.S.
- Died: May 30, 1956 (aged 51) New York City, U.S.
- Genre: Jazz
- Occupations: Musician, entertainer
- Instrument: Trumpet

Valaida Snow (June 2, 1904 – May 30, 1956) was an American jazz musician and entertainer who performed internationally. She was also known as "Little Louis" and "Queen of the Trumpet," a nickname given to her by W. C. Handy.

== Early life ==
Snow was born in Chattanooga, Tennessee. Her mother, Etta, was a Howard University-educated music teacher and her father, John, was a minister who was the leader of the Pickaninny Troubadours, a group mainly consisting of child performers. Raised on the road in a show-business family, where starting from the age of five, she began performing with her father's group. By the time she was 15, she learned to play cello, bass, banjo, violin, mandolin, harp, accordion, clarinet, trumpet, and saxophone. She also sang and danced.

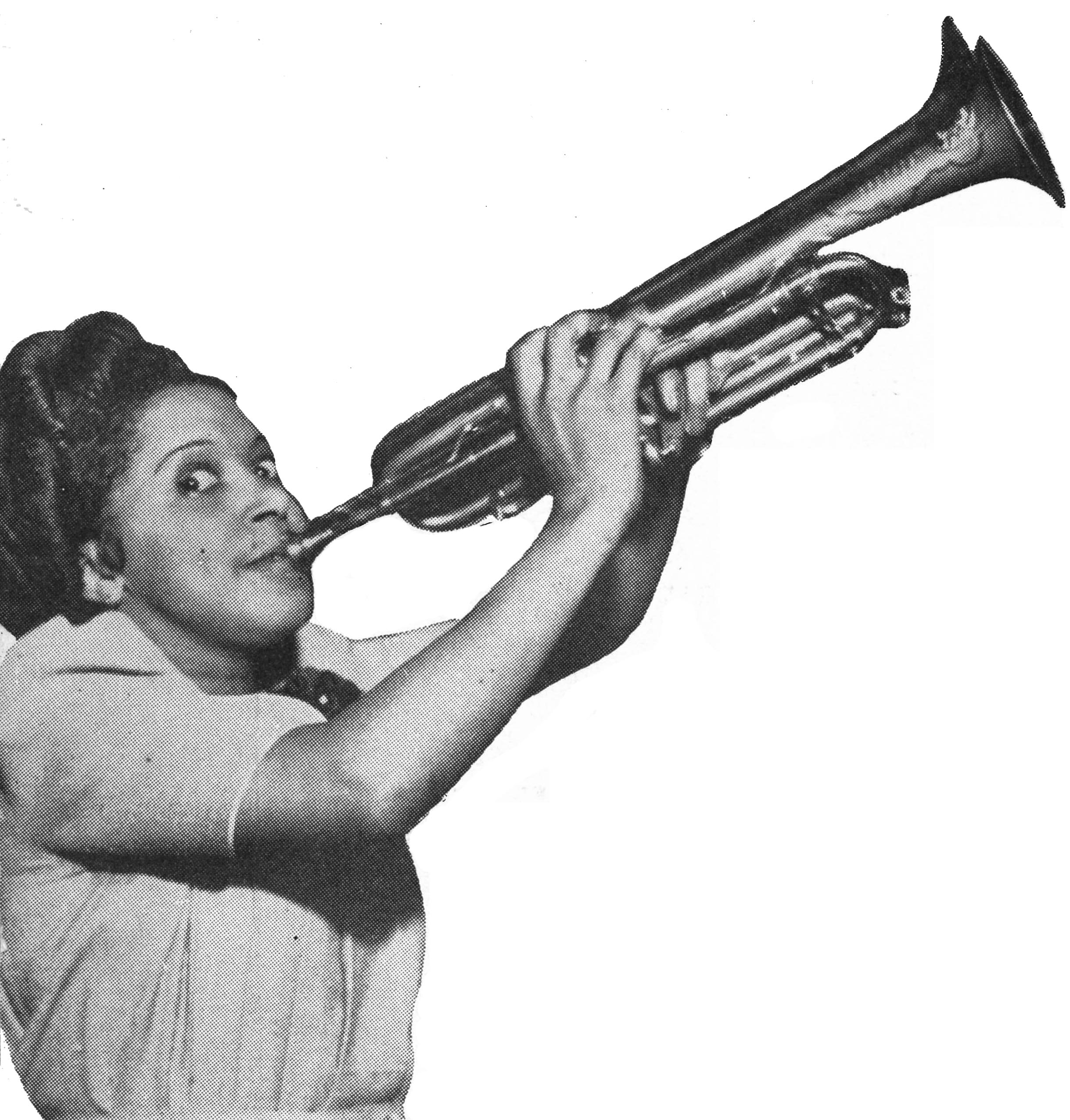
Snow appeared in a Swedish advertisement when she toured Scandinavia

== Career ==
Snow's solo career began in 1921 when she joined a popular revue called Holiday in Dixieland, after exiting an abusive marriage. She then held a residency at a Harlem cabaret, which grew her profile.

In the year 1922 at 18 years old, Snow gained national recognition, leading her to travel all over the U.S. to perform as a dancer, musician (trumpet player), and singer. The following year, she appeared in the black musical Ramblin Round. In the year 1923, she also appeared in Will Mastin’s Follow Me revue.

In 1924, Snow was cast alongside Josephine Baker in the musical In Bamville, a follow-up to the enduring hit musical Shuffle Along. While the musical was itself not a hit, Baker and Snow both received positive reviews. She became a key figure in the musical's New York run, now titled The Chocolate Dandies along with Elizabeth Welch and Josephine Baker.

After focusing on the trumpet, Snow quickly became so famous at the instrument that she was nicknamed "Little Louis" after Louis Armstrong, who called her the world's second-best jazz trumpet player, besides himself. W. C. Handy, who is known as the Father of the Blues, gave her the nickname "Queen of the Trumpet." Contemporary critics Krin Gabbard and Will Friedwald have commented on her approach to playing like Armstrong. Gabbard said she developed a "distinctly Armstrongian style" and Friedwald said she "mimicked" Armstrong. In a 1928 performance in Chicago at the Sunset Café, Snow played the trumpet, sang. Then seven pairs of shoes were placed in a row at the front of the stage, and she danced in each pair for one chorus. The dances and shoes to match were: soft-shoe, adagio shoes, tap shoes, Dutch clogs, Chinese straw sandals, Turkish slippers, and the last pair, Russian boots. "When Louis Armstrong saw the show one night, he continued clapping after others had stopped and remarked, 'Boy I never saw anything that great'." Despite her talent, she had fewer opportunities to hold residencies as a bandleader at clubs in New York or Chicago, like many of her male peers. Instead, she predominantly toured, playing concerts throughout the US, Europe, and China. In 1926, she toured London and Paris with Lew Leslie's Blackbirds revue and then from 1926 to 1929, she toured with Jack Carter's Serenaders in Shanghai, Singapore, Calcutta, and Jakarta.

Snow's most successful period was in the 1930s when she became the toast of London and Paris. Around this time she recorded her hit song "High Hat, Trumpet, and Rhythm". In 1931, she performed in the Ethel Waters show Rhapsody in Black, in New York. Snow directed the show's band and had a prominent role in the show, which had been designed by Lew Leslie to feature Snow. However, the show's credits did not reflect her role, as it was advertised around Ethel Waters, with the on-stage band's name remaining Pike Davis's Continental Orchestra. Snow's songs included "Saint James Infirmary" and "Till the Real Thing Comes Along". In 1933, she created her first record and toured with Earl Hines' band. Snow conducted the band for the London run of Blackbirds of 1934.

In the mid-1930s, Snow made films with her husband, Ananias Berry, of the Berry Brothers dancing troupe. These included Take it From Me and Irresistible You. After playing the Apollo Theater in New York City, she revisited Europe and the Far East for more shows and films. In the late 1930's Snow appeared in the French films L'Alibi and Pièges.

Snow toured Europe during World War II, and in 1940 became trapped without her manager when Nazi soldiers took over Denmark. She was arrested and held in two Danish prisons. Although never charged, the allegations against her were reportedly about theft and illegal drugs. Snow later said she was arrested by Nazis and most likely kept at Vestre Fængsel, a Danish prison in Copenhagen that was run by the Nazis, before being released on a prisoner exchange in May 1942. It was rumored that her friendship with a Belgian police official helped her to board a ship carrying foreign diplomats. Snow's return to the U.S. was widely covered in the Black press. According to jazz historian Scott Yanow, "she never emotionally recovered from the experience".

In 1943 Snow again led a band at the Apollo Theater in Harlem, and continued to perform and create recordings for the rest of her life. During the 1940s, Snow lived in Los Angeles and mentored a new generation of musicians there. However, in the 1950s, she was unable to regain her former success.

Valaida Snow died aged 51 of a brain hemorrhage on May 30, 1956, in New York City, backstage during a performance at the Palace Theatre. Her death came three days before her 52nd birthday.

== Personal life ==
Snow had 3 sisters Lavaida, Alvaida, and Hattie all of whom were professional singers. She also had a brother named Arthur Bush.

Snow married Samuel Lewis Lanier when she was 15, but she left him after he was abusive towards her.

According to an article posted in the Pittsburgh Courier in 1933, Snow was arrested and later acquitted of bigamy after eloping with her fiancé Ananias John W. Berry, Jr. Berry was a dancer who performed in his family's act, the Berry Brothers. The bigamy charges had been initiated by Snow's first husband, Lanier, who claimed their marriage was never officially annulled. Valaida married Ananias Berry in 1934. Negative publicity surrounding the charges and the age gap between Snow and the younger Berry strained their relationship, and they eventually separated.

Snow reportedly never recovered from her imprisonment during World War II, losing a lot of weight and carrying "an air of sadness."

In 1943 Valaida married Earle Edwards who later became her manager.

== Legacy ==
Many recordings of Snow performances still exist, including audio recordings and audiovisual recordings of her on stage or in films. According to musicology professor Tammy L. Kernodle, "The unfortunate thing about her legacy is that she wasn't recorded as much as many of her peers, but she was a greatly respected musician on the vaudeville circuit, and even amongst male jazz musicians themselves." This quote was from a phone interview by Giovanni Russonello, who on February 22, 2020, published her belated obituary in The New York Times, as part of the "Overlooked No More" series. There are no commercial recordings of Snow as trumpeter made in the United States, all were recorded in Europe. Before her obituary was published, The New York Times wrote about her only once in a paragraph-long review about a 1949 Song Recital at New York's Town Hall.

Dr. Kernodle also said that Snow's legacy is important as she helped "shift the context of jazz away from the early Dixieland style" and "she [was] important in terms of helping us gain an understanding of the spread of jazz to Europe, particularly after World War I."

== Concentration camp controversy ==
In interviews after returning from Europe during World War II, Snow claimed she had been in a Nazi concentration camp. She described being imprisoned for eight months and beaten.

Historian Jayna Brown studied the controversy over Snow's alleged rumor regarding being detained in a Nazi concentration camp, and concluded that she had not been in a concentration camp. According to Brown, on September 15, 1939, Snow's manager Earl Sutcliff was advised to leave the country to escape the violence that was taking place in Europe. It is unclear why or what exactly took place but both Sutcliff and Snow remained in Copenhagen. According to Brown, Snow had another chance to leave Europe, but again refused. Instead, her manager was forced to leave due to drug-related charges; upon arriving in New York he was the first one to state that Snow was allegedly being held in a Nazi concentration camp, where he had nearly escaped.

To add to the confusion and controversy, many have been unable to place Snow's whereabouts between February and October 1941. In October of 1941, Snow was living under some sort of surveillance in Copenhagen until she was detained with no criminal charges on March 12, 1942, and sent to Vestre Faengsel. Brown indicates that this period was used to treat Snow's alleged drug addiction, and as a way to ensure that she would be able to return to the U.S. Snow's biographer Mark Miller proposed that this jailing could have been the Danish authorities' method of protecting her during Nazi occupation. He reported that Snow spent a total of ten weeks in two different Danish prisons.

== Performances ==
- March 11, 1933; Earl Hines and Snow performed in Madrid ballroom in Harrisburg, PA.
- September 23, 1945; First Cavalcade of Jazz concert in Los Angeles at Wrigley Field produced by Leon Hefflin Sr. along with Count Basie, The Honeydrippers, The Peters Sisters, Slim and Bam and Joe Turner.

== In literature ==
- Earl Hines' oral autobiography, The World of Earl Hines (with Stanley Dance) includes several vignettes of Snow by her intimate friend.
- John Edgar Wideman (1989). "Valaida". Fever: Twelve Stories. Henry Holt and Co. ISBN 978-0-8050-1184-5.
  Valaida Snow appears as a fictional character who threw herself on top of the protagonist when he was a child to shield him from a beating at the hands of the Nazis in a concentration camp. Snow is depicted as a strong, generous woman who proudly recalls that "They beat me, and fucked me in every hole I had. I was their whore. Their maid. A stool they stood on when they wanted to reach a little higher. But I never sang in their cage, Bobby. Not one note" (p. 28).
- Candace Allen (2004). Valaida. London: Virago. ISBN 978-1-84408-172-1.
  A novel based on Valaida Snow's life story.
- Mark Miller (2007). High Hat, Trumpet and Rhythm: The Life and Music of Valaida Snow. Toronto: The Mercury Press. ISBN 978-1-55128-127-8.
  Biography. Both the Allen and Miller books contradict the assertion that Snow was held by the Nazis and instead place her in Danish custody at a Copenhagen prison.
- Pascal Rannou (2008). Noire, la neige. Marseille: Editions Parenthèses. ISBN 978-2-86364-648-9.
  Inspired by Valaida's life, but it is more fictitious than strictly biographical.
- Valaida Snow, by Emmanuel Reuzé and Maël Rannou, comic strip, BDMusic, Paris, coll. " BDJazz ", 2012.

== Discography ==
- 1940–1953 (Classics)
- Queen of Trumpet and Song (DRG, 1999)
- Until The Real Thing Comes Along (Monk – MK343 LP, Compilation)
