= Mobileye =

Israeli information technology company

Mobileye Global Inc.
- Type: Public subsidiary
- Traded as: Nasdaq: MBLY (Class A)
- Industry: Automotive; Autonomous cars
- Founded: May 13, 1999; 27 years ago in Jerusalem, Israel
- Founders: Amnon Shashua; Norio Ichihashi; Ziv Aviram
- Headquarters: Jerusalem, Israel
- Key people: Amnon Shashua (president and CEO); Saf Yeboah-Amankwah (chairman)
- Products: EyeQ; REM; RSS; Mobileye SuperVision; Mobileye Drive; Mobileye Robotaxi
- Revenue: ▼US$1.65 billion (2024)
- Operating income: ▼US$−3.2 billion (2024)
- Net income: ▼US$−3.1 billion (2024)
- Total assets: ▼US$12.6 billion (2024)
- Total equity: ▼US$12.1 billion (2024)
- Owner: Intel (88.3%)
- Number of employees: 3,900 (2024)
- Website: mobileye.com

Mobileye Global Inc. is a United States-domiciled, Israel-headquartered autonomous driving company. It is developing physical AI technologies, including self-driving and advanced driver-assistance systems (ADAS) as well as humanoid robotics. Mobileye was acquired by Intel in 2017 and went public again in 2022.

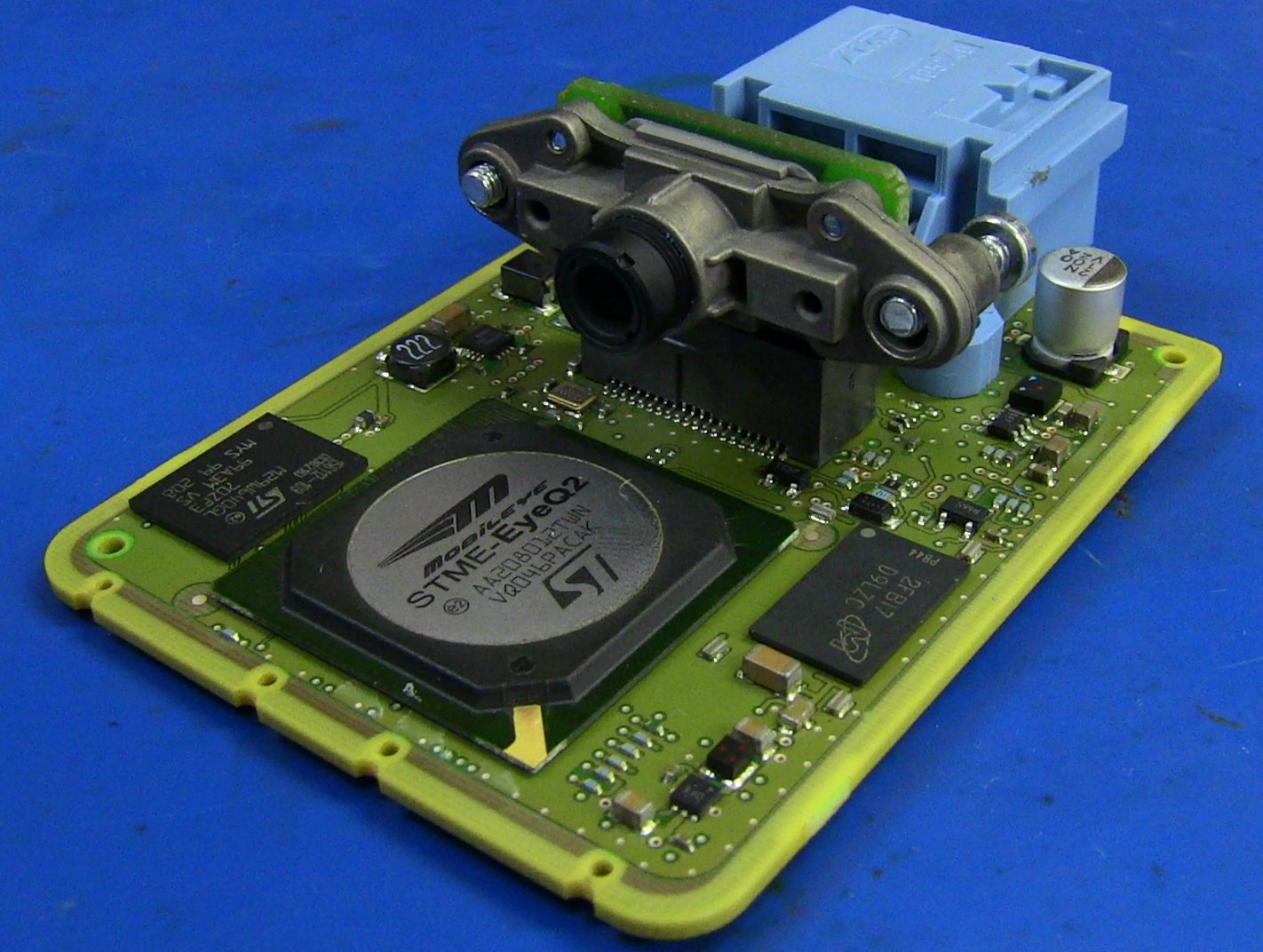
A Mobileye EyeQ2 chip used in a Hyundai Lane Guidance camera module

== History ==
Mobileye was founded on May 13, 1999 by Hebrew University professor Amnon Shashua. He evolved his academic research into a vision system that could detect vehicles using a camera and software. It developed into a supplier of automotive safety technologies based on adding "intelligence" to inexpensive cameras for commercialization.

Mobileye established its first research center in 2004. It launched the first generation EyeQ1 processor in 2008. The technology offered driver assistance including automatic emergency braking. One of the first vehicles to use this technology was the fifth-generation BMW 7 Series. Versions of the chip were released in 2010, 2014 and 2018.

In 2013, Mobileye announced the sale of a 25% stake to investors for $400 million, valuing the company at approximately $1.5 billion.

Mobileye went public on the New York Stock Exchange in 2014. It raised $890 million, and became the largest Israeli IPO in U.S. history. By the end of the year, Mobileye's technology had been implemented in 160 car models made by 18 different OEMs.

In 2017, Mobileye unveiled a mathematical model for safe self-driving cars based on research by CEO Amnon Shashua and VP of Technology Shai Shalev-Shwartz. Their study outlined a system called Responsibility-Sensitive Safety (RSS) which redefines fault and caution and could potentially be used to inform insurers and driving laws. Shalev-Shwartz was promoted to CTO in 2019.

In March 2017, Intel announced that it would acquire Mobileye for $15.3 billion — the biggest-ever acquisition of an Israeli tech company at the time. Following the acquisition, Reuters reported that the U.S. Securities and Exchange Commission had charged two Israelis, Ariel Darvasi and Amir Waldman, with insider trading prior to the announcement. Both had connections to Mobileye through the Hebrew University of Jerusalem, where Mobileye's technology was first developed. The public university's (Hebrew University of Jerusalem) scientific community produced at least 11 Mobileye directors and officers The SEC obtained an emergency court order, freezing certain assets of Virginia residents Lawrence F. Cluff, Jr. and Roger E. Shaoul, who allegedly used insider information to make approximately $1 million on the announcement. The SEC's amended complaint alleges that James Shaoul has professional and personal relationships with Mobileye founders. Shaoul allegedly tipped his brother Roger E. Shaoul with nonpublic information. Roger Shaoul allegedly then tipped Lawrence F. Cluff Jr. with nonpublic information about the tender offer, saying his family knew Mobileye's founders and they were recommending that friends and family invest in the company. All of the suspicious trading allegedly occurred in two accounts held in Cluff's name, including an account that had been dormant since 2011 before Cluff purchased Mobileye stock on Jan. 30, 2017. According to the SEC's amended complaint, James Shaoul resides in Israel where Mobileye's principal offices are located. Shaoul is a physician specializing in nonsurgical cosmetic procedures, including botox and laser hair removal. A Mobileye director and his wife have received treatment at Shaoul's clinic. Neither Intel nor Mobileye were accused by the SEC of violating the law.

In October 2018, Mobileye and Volkswagen released plans to commercialize Mobility-as-a-Service (MaaS) in Israel. Mobileye instead began "robotaxi" trials with Nio electric vehicles in Israel in May 2020 due to Volkswagen delays, and unveiled its robotaxi in 2021 at the IAA Mobility show in Munich.

Mobileye demonstrated an autonomous car equipped only with cameras in Jerusalem in January 2020. It later tested the cars in Munich and New York City.

In December 2021, Intel announced its plan to take Mobileye public via in 2022, while maintaining its majority ownership, this time on Nasdaq. In October 2022, Intel offered 5–6% of outstanding shares, raising $861 million on 41 million shares. This valued Mobileye at around $17 billion – more than what Intel had paid in 2017. Intel continued to hold all Class B shares, giving itself an overall 99.4% of voting power.

In January 2026, it was announced Mobileye had agreed to acquire Mentee Robotics (a company co-founded by Amnon Shashua in 2022) for approximately $900 million, subject to customary closing conditions. The acquisition was intended to expand Mobileye’s activities in physical artificial intelligence, with Mentee Robotics continuing to operate as an independent unit following completion, which was expected in the first quarter of 2026.

== Partnerships ==
Mobileye formed partnerships with various automakers. Mobileye launched multiple series productions for LDW on GM Cadillac STS and DTS vehicles, and on BMW 5 and 6 Series vehicles. In 2016, Mobileye and Delphi formed a partnership to develop an autonomous driving system. In early 2017, Mobileye announced a partnership with BMW to integrate Mobileye technology into vehicles going to market in 2018. In 2018, Mobileye announced partnerships with BMW, Nissan and Volkswagen. In 2019, Mobileye and NIO announced that they would partner on the development of AVs for consumer markets in China and other major territories. In July 2020, Mobileye and Ford announced a deal in which Mobileye would supply its EyeQ camera-based gear and software across Ford's global product line. Also in 2020, Mobileye partnered with WILLER29 to launch a robotaxi service in Japan, Taiwan and Southeast Asia and with Geely for ADAS. The same year, Intel announced that it had acquired Moovit, a mobility-as-a-service (MaaS) company, to enhance Mobileye's MaaS offering.

In February 2021, Mobileye, Transdev Autonomous Transport System (ATS) and Lohr Group formed a partnership to develop and deploy autonomous shuttles, and in April Mobileye announced a partnership with Udelv on the company's Transporter electric self-driving delivery vehicle. In 2021, Toyota Motor Corp. selected Mobileye and German supplier ZF to develop and supply ADAS and Mobileye began a partnership with Mahindra.

In December 2025, Mobileye announced the lay-off of about 200 employees, or 5% of its global workforce. This is par of the company's plan to regroup in light of falling demand and revenue.

=== Porsche ===
In May 2023, Porsche and Mobileye launched a collaboration to provide Mobileye’s SuperVision™ in future Porsche production models.

=== Tesla ===
In August 2015, Tesla Motors announced that it would incorporate Mobileye's technology in Model S cars. Tesla reportedly did not share its plans with Mobileye, and after the first deadly crash of a self-driving Model S with Autopilot became public in June 2016, Mobileye ended their partnership. The two companies expressed disagreement over what caused the accident, with Shashua claiming that Tesla "was pushing the envelope in terms of safety" and that Autopilot is a "driver assistance system" and not a "driverless system". Mobileye issued a statement that its systems did not recognize a "lateral turn across path".

== Products ==
=== Mobileye Surround ADAS ===
Surround ADAS is a driver-assist solution that brings hands-off highway assist and intelligent parking capabilities to mass-market vehicle models. At its core is Mobileye’s EyeQ SoC, powering a multi-sensor fusion stack that combines data from surround-view cameras and radars.

=== Mobileye SuperVision ===
SuperVision uses EyeQ5 SoC data from 11 cameras. The system uses cameras only and is designed for hands-off cars. Geely's Zeekr electric vehicle is equipped with Mobileye SuperVision ADAS and began road trials in 2021.

=== Mobileye Drive ===
Mobileye Drive is a Level 4 self-driving system. The sensor suite includes 13 cameras, 3 long-range LiDARs, 6 short-range LiDARs and 6 radars. Mobileye Drive was first fitted to vehicles used for ride-hailing services in 2021, with plans for public testing in Germany and Israel in 2022.

=== Mobileye Chauffeur ===
Mobileye Chauffeur is a full-featured hands-off/eyes-off (highway)/hands-off/eyes-on street autonomous driving system. As of August 2023, it was planned for initial release on Polestar 4.

=== Aftermarket ===
Mobileye's aftermarket vision-based ADAS systems are based on the same core technology as for production models. These systems offer lane departure warning, forward collision warning, headway monitoring and warning, intelligent headlamp control and speed limit indication (tsr). These systems have been integrated with fleet management systems.

== Technology ==
=== EyeQ ===
The EyeQ system-on-chip (SoC) utilizes a single camera sensor to provide passive/active ADAS features including automatic emergency braking (AEB), adaptive cruise control (ACC), lane keeping assist(LKA), traffic jam assist (TJA) and forward collision warning (FCW). Mobileye's fifth-generation EyeQ supports fully autonomous vehicles. More than 27 automobile manufacturers utilize EyeQ for their assisted-driving technologies.

=== Road Experience Management (REM) ===
Mobileye's Road Experience Management, or REM, uses real-time data from Mobileye-equipped vehicles to maintain its 3D maps. The data collected amounts to about 10 kilobytes per kilometer. It is compiled in a map called Mobileye RoadBook that leverages anonymized, crowdsourced data from vehicle cameras for navigation and localization. According to Mobileye, REM had mapped more than 7.5 billion kilometers of roads by January 2021.

=== Responsibility-Sensitive Safety Model (RSS) ===
RSS, or the Responsibility-Sensitive Safety Model, is a mathematical safety model first proposed by Mobileye in 2017. RSS models AV decision-making and digitizes the implicit rules of safe driving for AVs to prevent self-driving vehicles from causing accidents. RSS is defined in software.

=== True Redundancy ===
True Redundancy is an integrated autonomous driving system that utilizes data streams from 360-surround view cameras, lidar, and radar. This approach adds a lidar/radar subsystem to its computer-vision subsystem for redundancy.

=== Operating system ===
Mobileye created operating system DXP for autonomous vehicles.

== Chips ==
=== Comparison ===
Mobileye	EyeQ1	EyeQ2	EyeQ3	EyeQ4		EyeQ5		EyeQ6		EyeQ7
Configuration				Mid	High	Mid	High	Lite	High	High
On market	2008	2010	2014	2018		2021	2021	2023	2025	2027
Claimed autonomous level	Driver Assistance		2	2	4	2	5	2	5	5
Performance (int8 TOPS)	0.0044	0.026	0.256	1.1	2	4.6	16	5	34	67
Power consumption	2.5 watt	2.5 watt	2.5 watt				27 watt		33 watt	60 watt
CPU								2 core, 8 thread	8 core, 32 thread	12 core, 24 thread
Memory								LPDDR4(X)	LPDDR5	LPDDR5X
Semiconductor node	180 nm CMOS	90 nm CMOS	40 nm CMOS	28 nm FD-SOI		7 nm FinFET		7 nm FinFET		5 nm
Algorithms & neural networks			Vehicle's Rear; Pedestrians; Lane Markings; Semantic Free Space; Traffic signs	3D Vehicles, Next-Gen Lane Markings; Road Markings; Traffic Lights; Relevance of Traffic Lights; Next-Gen Semantic Free Space; Road Profile; General Objects; Hazards; Animals; Path Prediction; Road Edges		3D Vidar (Pseudo Lidar); Pixel-Level Scene Segmentation; Full Image Detection; Surface Segmentation; Lane Semantics; Road Users Trajectory Prediction; Parallax Net; Vector Field, Multi-Camera Bird's Eye View Network; Road Users Understanding; Road Geometry				
Implementations			Audi's Traffic Jam Pilot; 2019 Audi A8; Cadillac CT6 (2017–2019); GM's Supercruise; Ford F-150 (2018–2020); Hyundai Ioniq (2018-2020); Nissan's ProPilot; 2020 Nissan Skyline; 2023 Nissan Ariya; Tesla Autopilot Hardware 1; Model S & X (Sep-2014 – Oct-2016); Volvo's Pilot Assist 1, 2 & 3	BMW Driving Assistant Professional; BMW X5 (2019–2020); 3 Series (2019–2020); Ford Co-Pilot360; Ford Puma (2020); Ford Mustang Mach-E (2021); Ford F-150 (2021); Li Xiang One; NIO Pilot; Nio ES8; Nio ES6; Nissan's ProPilot 2.0; VW Travel Assist; Volkswagen Passat (2019–2020); Volkswagen Golf 8 (2020); Volkswagen ID.4 (2021); Škoda Enyaq (2021); Honda Sensing; Honda HR-V (2021); Honda Civic (2022); Honda ZR-V (2023)		BMW's Personal Copilot; BMW iX (2022); Zeekr Copilot (SuperVision™); Zeekr 001 (2021); Zeekr 009 (2023)				

=== Hardware ===
Production model	Zeekr 001
Production date	Q4 2021
Product name	Co-pilot
Chips
Board	2x MobilEye EyeQ5H
Sensors
Forward radar	250 m (820 ft) ultra-long sensing millimeter wave radar
Forward cameras	Narrow (28°): 8 megapixels; Main (120°): 8 megapixels
Forward looking side cameras	Left (100°): 8 megapixels; Right (100°): 8 megapixels
Rearward looking side cameras	Left (100°): 8 megapixels; Right: (100°): 8 megapixels
Rearview cameras	Rear (60°): 8 megapixels
Parking cameras	4x Parking Cameras (192°): 8 megapixels

== Business ==
It has sales and marketing offices in Midtown, Manhattan, U.S.; Shanghai, China; Tokyo, Japan; and Düsseldorf, Germany.

In 2025, Mobileye laid off approximately 200 employees, representing about 4-5% of its workforce, due to declining demand. The majority of these employees are based in Israel.

== See also ==
- Science and technology in Israel
- Economy of Israel
- Start-up Nation
- OrCam device
- Automatic emergency braking
- ADAS
- Self-driving car
