= This Is the Army =

1943 film by Michael Curtiz

- Original film poster
- Directed by: Michael Curtiz
- Screenplay by: Casey Robinson; Claude Binyon
- Based on: This Is the Army; 1942 play by Irving Berlin; James McColl
- Produced by: Jack L. Warner; Hal B. Wallis
- Starring: George Murphy; Joan Leslie; Ronald Reagan; George Tobias; Alan Hale
- Cinematography: Bert Glennon; Sol Polito
- Edited by: George Amy
- Music by: Irving Berlin (music and lyrics); Ray Heindorf (score)
- Color process: Technicolor
- Production company: Warner Bros. Pictures
- Distributed by: Warner Bros. Pictures
- Release date: August 14, 1943
- Running time: 113 or 120 minutes
- Country: United States
- Language: English
- Budget: $1,870,000
- Box office: $10,445,000

This Is the Army is a 1943 American wartime musical comedy film produced by Jack L. Warner and Hal B. Wallis and directed by Michael Curtiz, adapted from the wartime stage musical of the same name, designed to boost morale in the U.S. during World War II, directed by Ezra Stone. The screenplay by Casey Robinson and Claude Binyon was based on the 1942 Broadway musical written by James McColl and Irving Berlin, with music and lyrics by Berlin. Berlin composed the film's 19 songs, and sang one of them.

The movie stars George Murphy, Joan Leslie, George Tobias, Ronald Reagan and Alan Hale, and features a large ensemble cast including Charles Butterworth, Dolores Costello, Una Merkel, Stanley Ridges, Rosemary de Camp, Ruth Donnelly, Dorothy Peterson, Frances Langford, Gertrude Niesen, Kate Smith, and Joe Louis. The cast of both the film, and the stage play on which it was based, included soldiers of the U.S. Army who were actors and performers in civilian life, including Reagan and Louis.

== Plot ==
Full movie

In 1917 New York City, actor and dancer Jerry Jones is drafted into the US Army, where he is encouraged by his superiors at nearby Camp Upton to stage a musical revue for boosting morale. The production, Yip Yip Yaphank, which features an all-soldier cast, is a rousing success, but one night orders are received to leave immediately for France; instead of the finale, the troops march up the aisles through the audience, out the theater's main entrance and into a convoy of waiting trucks. Among the teary, last-minute goodbyes, Jerry kisses his newlywed bride Ethel farewell.

Overseas, in the trenches of France, several cast members from the production are killed or wounded by shrapnel from a German artillery barrage. Jerry is wounded in the leg and is forced to walk with a cane, prematurely ending his career as a dancer. Nevertheless, he is resolved to find something useful to do with his life, especially after being informed that he is now the father of a son, and eventually establishes a theatrical agency. Eddie Dibble, the troop bugler, is also among the survivors.

Twenty-five years later, World War II is raging in Europe. Jerry's son Johnny P. Jones, previously his father's assistant, enlists in the Army shortly after Pearl Harbor. He informs his sweetheart, Eddie's daughter, Eileen Dibble, that they cannot marry until he returns, as he has recently visited the family of soldier Blake Nelson, who was killed during the attack, and is unwilling to make her a widow.

Many of the World War I veterans, including Jerry, Eddie and their friend Maxie Twardofsky, visit Camp Upton, discovering that their old instructor, Sergeant McGee, is still training soldiers. The older men decide to put on another show, entitled This Is the Army, to raise money for the Army Relief Fund. Johnny reluctantly agrees to stage it. The show becomes massively popular, goes on tour throughout the United States, and eventually plays in Washington, D.C., in front of President Franklin Delano Roosevelt. During the show, it is announced that this is the final performance. The soldiers in the production learn that they have been ordered back to their combat units.

Having recently joined the Red Cross auxiliary, Eileen appears backstage and confesses to Johnny that she finally understands the risks of marrying a soldier. On stage, the former stars of Yip Yip Yaphank perform a song-and-dance number, with Jerry appearing with them despite his injured leg. During an intermission in the show she brings a minister and persuades Johnny that they should marry immediately; they proceed to do so in the alley behind the theater, with their fathers acting as witnesses. At the end of the show, the men simulate marching off to the front as their fathers did before them.

== Cast ==
- George Murphy as Jerry Jones
- Joan Leslie as Eileen Dibble
- Ronald Reagan as Corporal, later Lieutenant, Johnny Jones
- George Tobias as Maxie Twardofsky
- Alan Hale Sr. as Sgt. McGee
- Charles Butterworth as Eddie Dibble
- Dolores Costello as Mrs. Davidson
- Una Merkel as Rose Dibble
- Stanley Ridges as Maj., later Col., John B. Davidson
- Rosemary DeCamp as Ethel Jones
- Ruth Donnelly as Mrs. O'Brien
- Dorothy Peterson as Mrs. Nelson
- Gertrude Niesen as World War I vocalist
- Jack Young as Franklin D. Roosevelt (uncredited)
- As themselves:
- Irving Berlin
- Frances Langford
- Joe Louis
- Kate Smith
- Ezra Stone

This Is the Army
- Film soundtrack album (1970s bootleg issue)
- Music: Irving Berlin
- Lyrics: Irving Berlin and Carmen Miranda
- Basis: Irving Berlin's play Yip! Yip! Yaphank
- Productions: 1942 Broadway; 1943–1945 traveling show

== Production ==
Some location shooting for the film took place at Camp Cooke in central California. The Warner Bros. Ranch in Calabasas, California was used for the World War I battle scenes.

The title of the movie is the same as the title of the stage version of the show. The movie features star appearances by Irving Berlin, Kate Smith, Frances Langford and Joe Louis as themselves. Smith's full-length rendition of Berlin's "God Bless America" is arguably the most famous cinematic rendition of the piece. Louis appears in a revue piece called "What the Well-Dressed Man in Harlem Will Wear", with James Cross (lead singer and dancer), William Wycoff (dancer in drag), Marion Brown (heavyset dancer), and a chorus of perhaps a dozen, the only spoken/sung scene that includes African-Americans. Louis appears in two other scenes, one in a boxing match, and the second being the stage door canteen number. He did not speak in either scene.

George Murphy was not the first actor considered for the role of Jerry. Fred Astaire, Joseph Cotten and Walter Huston were all considered first. George Brent was also offered the role of Major (then Colonel) Davidson, which was played in the film by Stanley Ridges, but Brent refused to work without being paid. Ginger Rogers was considered for the role of Eileen, played in the film by Joan Leslie. Frances Langford sings the song "What Does He Look Like?", but it was originally offered to Dinah Shore, who turned it down because she felt the lyrics made it more appropriate for a man to sing it.

One of the film's highlights is Irving Berlin himself singing his song "Oh! How I Hate to Get Up in the Morning", a scene borrowed from Yip! Yip! Yaphank!. Alan Anderson, a young army sergeant, who worked on the film, remembered Berlin's rendition. He told American Legends website: "He'd done the song all across the country, but Berlin loved doing it in the movie. Here was a chance for it to be on film-for posterity."

The celebrity impersonation "hamburger" sequence includes accurate spoofs of Broadway stars Jane Cowl, Lynn Fontanne, Alfred Lunt and Ethel Barrymore, and film stars Charles Boyer and Herbert Marshall. The Cowl, Fontanne and Barrymore impersonations are all performed as drag (entertainment). The revue pieces also include acrobat routines, several comedy pieces, and additional songs in drag (entertainment) ("Ladies of the Chorus" and "Hostesses of the Stage Door Canteen"), a magic skit, a minstrel show sketch (often removed from consumer videos and television broadcasts), and tributes to the Navy and the Air Corps.

Although the core of the movie consists of the musical numbers, the movie contains a veneer of a plot involving the wartime love interests of both the father and the son.

Producers Jack Warner and Hal Wallis, director Michael Curtiz and screenwriter Casey Robinson all donated their salaries to the Army Emergency Relief Fund. Many of the soldiers who had participated in the show held reunions every five years after the end of World War II. Their tenth and final reunion (1992) was held in New York's Theater District. Five hundred men were used in the final number "This Will Be the Last Time".

== Release and reception ==
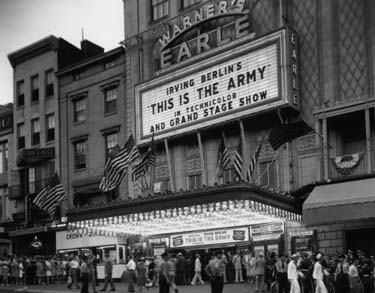
The premiere of This is the Army, at the Warner Theatre in Washington D.C.

The film's New York premiere was at the Hollywood Theatre on Broadway on July 28, 1943. It premiered at the Warner's Earle Theater in Washington, D.C. on August 12, 1943.

=== Box office ===
The film grossed $9,555,586 (equal to $177,789,028 today), which was donated to Army Emergency Relief. It produced rental revenue of $8,301,000 in the United States and Canada, and $2,144,000 overseas, for a total of $10,445,000. It was the highest-grossing musical film of all-time until it was surpassed by White Christmas in 1954. The receipts from This Is the Army place it among the top 40 movies of all time in U.S. box office popularity, which considers both inflation and the size of the population when the movie was released.

By the mid-1970s, the movie fell into the public domain, occasionally airing on television to a new generation of viewers. Renewed interest in some of the actors helped other actors that might have been considered down-and-out, most notably Stump and Stumpy's Jimmy Cross and Harold Cromer.

=== Awards and honors ===
The film received several Academy Award nominations, including Ray Heindorf for his musical score, Best Art Direction-Interior Decoration in a Color Film, and Best Sound Recording. Heindorf was the only winner for the film.

== Musical numbers (film) ==
As stated above, all songs were written by Irving Berlin.

"This Is The Army, Mr. Jones"

- "It's Your Country and My Country"
- "My Sweetie"
- "Poor Little Me"
- "We're On Our Way to France"
- "Goodbye, France"
- "God Bless America"
- "What Does He Look Like"
- "This Is The Army, Mr. Jones"
- "I'm Getting Tired So I Can Sleep"
- "Mandy"
- "Ladies of the Chorus"
- "That's What the Well Dressed Man in Harlem Will Wear"
- "How About a Cheer for the Navy"
- "Hostesses of the Stage Door Canteen"
- "I Left My Heart at the Stage Door Canteen"
- "With My Head in the Clouds/American Eagles"
- "Oh, How I Hate to Get Up in the Morning" (which Berlin himself performed)
- "This Time"

"My British Buddy", also sung by Irving Berlin, was cut from the film, but was released on DVD. It was originally added to the British production of the stage musical.

Ronald Reagan and Joan Leslie (clip)

== Award and honors ==
The musical score was nominated for and won the Oscar for Music (Scoring of a Musical Picture) (Ray Heindorf) at the 16th Academy Awards. The film was also nominated in the category Best Sound (Nathan Levinson), but lost to This Land Is Mine.

== Adaptations ==
Lux Radio Theatre presented a broadcast of the show on February 22, 1943, featuring 200 soldiers and a chorus of professional singers.

== See also ==
- Call Me Mister
- Winged Victory
