= Gene Hamilton (announcer) =

Gene Hamilton (December 12, 1910 - November 22, 2000) was an announcer in the era of old-time radio. (Another source gives his date of birth as February 22, 1910.) He had a 46-year career with NBC. An article in a contemporary magazine, Radio Guide, said Hamilton "has a splendid bass voice and one of the best of the group."

== Early years ==
Hamilton was born in Toledo, Ohio. His father was a concert baritone singer. Soon after Hamilton's high school graduation, he began singing and playing guitar with a vaudeville troupe.

== Career ==
Hamilton once said of becoming an announcer: "It was a very funny profession. It attracted a strange group of men. Nobody in the beginning set out to become an announcer; one just drifted into it accidentally. There were no experts.

Hamilton's debut on radio came when he sang and played guitar on WAIU, Columbus, Ohio, and in 1927 he became an announcer there. In 1929 he joined NBC, working at WTAM as master of ceremonies and announcer. The network moved him to Chicago in 1931, and in 1934 he went from there to New York, where he continued to work for NBC for more than four decades. Programs on which Hamilton was an announcer included The Buddy Weed Show, NBC Symphony concerts, The Voice of Firestone, Lum and Abner, The First Piano Quartet, the Boston Symphony hour, and Professor Quiz.

== "Dr. Gino Hamilton" ==
In 1940 executives at NBC noticed that members of the NBC Symphony Orchestra were on salary but not used enough on the air. Gene Hamilton, then a staff announcer for the network, proposed a satire of the highbrow symphonic broadcasts hosted by the dignified Milton Cross. The novelty was that these serious musicians would be playing traditional dixieland jazz, with a commentator burlesquing Cross's hushed tones and peppering his remarks with popular slang. NBC allowed Hamilton to host and produce the program, which made its debut in February 1940 as The Chamber Music Society of Lower Basin Street. The show was originally just a half-hour time filler, programmed on Sunday afternoons at 4:30 p.m. Eastern time on a sustaining (unsponsored) basis. Hamilton, appearing as musicologist "Dr. Gino Hamilton," invited guest performers to sit in with the studio musicians. The show found a cult audience, and so many listeners asked to see it in person that in October it was given a primetime slot on Monday evenings, with a studio audience. Fans protested vigorously when the network sometimes pre-empted the program and even planned to cancel it. As Variety commented: "NBC has twice decided to fold the series, but each time has continued it in response to listener agitation." Hamilton mentioned this off-again, on-again status on the air: "Greetings, music lovers, and if we've been canceled again and you're not hearing this, please don't tell us."

In November 1940, RCA Victor began a series of Chamber Music Society of Lower Basin Street 78-rpm record albums. Gene Hamilton appeared on the first one, offering humorous commentary on each of the records.

Hamilton was forced to leave Lower Basin Street in October 1941, when NBC promoted him to full-time producer. In March 1942 he became assistant to network production manager Harry Frazee. Hamilton continued to serve the network whenever an announcer was needed, including a stint introducing straight symphonic broadcasts. He even sang with the Boston Symphony on its November 18, 1944, broadcast.

NBC had canceled Lower Basin Street in 1944. Almost six years after the series lapsed, Hamilton took the premise to ABC Radio for a new series, Dr. Gino's Musicale, debuting on March 13, 1950. Hamilton adopted the same persona he had used on Lower Basin Street: "a bewildered character who tries to inspire appreciation for the classics" of the dixieland repertoire.

Variety reviewed the audition recording of Dr. Gino's Musicale and found it to be "a direct throwback" to Lower Basin Street, with "virtually the same format, the same beat, and the same musical director [Henry Levine]." NBC objected, on the grounds of possible plagiarism, but Hamilton asserted his claim as the format's originator. So much time had elapsed since Lower Basin Street's debut that NBC's legal staff wasn't sure who owned what, and finally settled with Hamilton. Hamilton returned to NBC to host a new revival of The Chamber Music Society of Lower Basin Street, airing on Saturday nights, sustaining, beginning July 8, 1950. Hamilton was not involved with NBC's brief 1952 revival of Lower Basin Street, which featured rising nightclub comedian "Dr. Orson Bean."

In 1952 NBC Radio began a new jazz series, this time a serious program spotlighting the latest jazz styles and stylists. Titled Jazz Arts Concerts, this after-midnight, Saturday-night series was broadcast from a Greenwich Village theater. The first broadcast aired on October 4, 1952, with musical guests Coleman Hawkins and Thelma Carpenter. An NBC press release remembered Lower Basin Street: "A further attraction of the series will be Gene 'Dr. Gino' Hamilton, long-term moderator of NBC's Chamber Music Society of Lower Basin Street. He will preside over Jazz Arts as emcee of each broadcast."

On April 18, 1953, Gene Hamilton launched another hot-jazz series for NBC, a Saturday-afternoon session simply titled Dr. Gino.

== Personal life ==
Hamilton and his wife, Mildred, had four sons and a daughter. He was an "exponent of the guitar and boxing." Even as an announcer, "he continued his singing, winning an audition as a basso in the Fred Waring Glee Club," but he chose to focus on his announcing career.

Hamilton and his wife, along with "a bevy of seasoned radio and stage troupers," formed the Footlighters, a stock theater company, in Nassau, New York, in 1946. The troupe's first production was Let Us Be Gay at the Baldwin High School auditorium on January 26, 1947.

Gene Hamilton remained with NBC as a full-time staff announcer, at a time when the position was being phased out. The broadcasting networks wanted to have their announcers pre-record their remarks so the tapes could be used repeatedly, replacing the announcers in person. The move was resisted by the AFTRA union, and was finally resolved when the union consented to pre-recording but insisted that all incumbent staff announcers must be guaranteed lifetime jobs. Among those veterans granted this action was Gene Hamilton, who said in 1973, "I'm trying to fill out my last two years with NBC by filling in wherever I can." He retired from broadcasting in 1975, at age 65.
