= Walkin' by the River =

Single by Ella Fitzgerald
- B-side: "My Favorite Song"
- Released: 1952
- Label: Decca
- Songwriters: Una Mae Carlisle; Robert Sour

Audio
- "Walkin' by the River" on YouTube

"Walkin' by the River" is a song written by Una Mae Carlisle and Robert Sour.

In 1941, it was a hit for Hal Kemp and His Orchestra, who recorded it on 30 October 1940 with a vocal refrain by Janet Blair. Later in 1941, it was recorded and released by Sylvia Froos. Since then, the song became a standard. In 1952, Ella Fitzgerald recorded it for Decca with the orchestra directed by Leroy Kirkland.

== Writing and composition ==
As Una Mae Carlisle recounted to the Ebony magazine in 1951, she wrote the song during her stay in England. When she returned to the United States, she wanted to complete it, but couldn't find a title. And it was writer John Steinbeck who came up with one for her.

Talking to another media outlet, she said that the song was born from her desire to honor the English people who "were very kind to [her]" and the Duke of Kent in particular. She explained: "I felt that I owed him something, as well as some other very nice people that I knew over there... and I had to pass the Thames quite often. So, I thought of a river and I walked by it, so that was it!"

== Releases and critical reception ==
=== Sylvia Froos version ===
Sylvia Froos released her version as a juke box short film on 8 September 1941. The sound was recorded at RCA Studios in late April with the studio orchestra under the direction of Ray Bloch, and the photography was done in early May, some possibly in late April. Billboard described the film as following: "Setting in home, with a switch to a garden by the river, where she waits for her love." Coin Machine Journal wrote: "The tune and the film are okeh, but would have been better had not Miss Froos attempted that turkey strut which she affects."

=== Ella Fitzgerald version ===
Ella Fitzgerald version
Review scores
Source	Rating
Billboard	77/100

In 1952, the song was released by Ella Fitzgerald. Billboard reviewed her single (Decca 28433, with "My Favorite Song" on the flip side) on 18 October, rating the side 77 ("good") on a scale of 1 to 100 and writing: "Thrush turns in a tender reading of this lovely standard. Quiet ork background showcases her effort nicely."
