= Stump, Kentucky =

Unincorporated community in Kentucky, United States

- Unincorporated community
- Location within the state of Kentucky Stump (the United States)
- Coordinates: 37°43′30″N 83°59′46″W
- Country: United States
- State: Kentucky
- County: Estill
- Elevation: 718 ft (219 m)
- Time zone: UTC-5 (Eastern (EST))
  - Summer (DST): UTC-4 (EDT)
- GNIS feature ID: 2440465

Stump is an unincorporated community located in Estill County, Kentucky, United States.
