= Diane Courtney =

American singer (born 1920 or 1921)

Diane Courtney (born Lillian Perron; 1920 or 1921) was an American singer who performed on radio and in clubs. She had a range of 2 1/2 octaves.

== Early years ==
Courtney was born Lillian Perron in Fall River, Massachusetts. Her father and her mother, Arline Trottier, a mezzo-soprano who starred with the Paris Opera Comique, were French. From the time she was born, they wanted her to have a career in classical music. Her studies at the Dominican Academy focused on the history of France, music, and the arts, and when she graduated at age 12 she did not know English. She attended B. M. C. Durfee High School, after which she continued her education at the New England Conservatory of Music, where she gained a knowledge of English along with French and classical music. Although Courtney and two other girls from the school diverted from the curriculum to form a trio that sang swing music on Boston radio station WEEI, she continued her studies until she played piano when the People's Symphony performed a concerto by Beethoven. She left the conservatory before graduating, as the trio had begun singing on stage at a movie theater in Boston. She helped to pay her expenses first by working as a waitress at the school and later by operating a switchboard in a dormitory.

== Career ==
=== Radio ===
In 1939 the trio that had begun at the conservatory disbanded with the marriage of one member. Courtney traveled to New York, auditioned for Fred Waring, and became Honey in the trio Two Bees and a Honey. After a year in that role she found work as a soloist on the Blue Network. When Prescott Presents debuted on NBC on July 14, 1941, Courtney was one of the featured singers. In 1941 she sang blues songs on The Chamber Music Society of Lower Basin Street. By April 1942 she was also heard on the Blue Network twice a week singing with the Jesters and once a week on her own program. In March 1943 she had become the featured singer on Milton Berle's new program on CBS. She was a regular on Jerry Lester's program that debuted on July 25, 1943.

Song Hits Magazine named Courtney the outstanding new songstress of 1944. In the summer of that year, she substituted for Irene Beasley while Beasley took a two-week vacation from her weekday afternoon CBS radio program. She was the "singing bridesmaid" on Honeymoon in New York, which debuted in early 1946.

=== Night clubs ===
When Courtney performed in night clubs she adapted her selection of songs to the listeners. Usually beginning with 20-25 songs, she said, "If one doesn't go over the first night, I try it the next. If it is not accepted then, I discard it. It is necessary to study the audience." Even when she retained songs, she varied the way she performed them. She said, "I never sing a song the same way twice."

Venues in which Courtney sang included the Swan Room at the Hotel Monteleone in New Orleans, Louisiana; the Triangle Room in the Seventh Avenue Hotel in Pittsburgh, Pennsylvania; Club Bali in Miami, Greenwich Village Inn in New York City; Shoreham Blue Room in Washington, D. C.; El Casbah at the Hotel Bellerive in Kansas City; the Flame in Duluth, Minnesota; Statler Terrace Room in Cleveland, Ohio; McVan's Hertel-Niagara Club in Buffalo, New York; and the Latin Quarter in Montreal, Canada.

In early 1950 Courtney sang in resort areas of South America and the West Indies, including night clubs in Caracas, Colon, Curacao, Havana, Jamaica, and Puerto Rico. That tour was followed immediately by an engagement in Ottawa, Ontario, Canada.

==== Critical response ====
After seeing Courtney sing at Cafe Life in New York City, Sid Weiss wrote in the trade publication Radio Daily: "Diane has everything the exacting Gods of fortune demand. She's got personality, charm and the power to 'sell' a torch song to a degree few possess. Someday Diane will be a star — a great personality."
