= Prostatic stromal tumour of uncertain malignant potential =

- Other names: Prostatic stromal proliferation of uncertain malignant potential (PSPUMP)
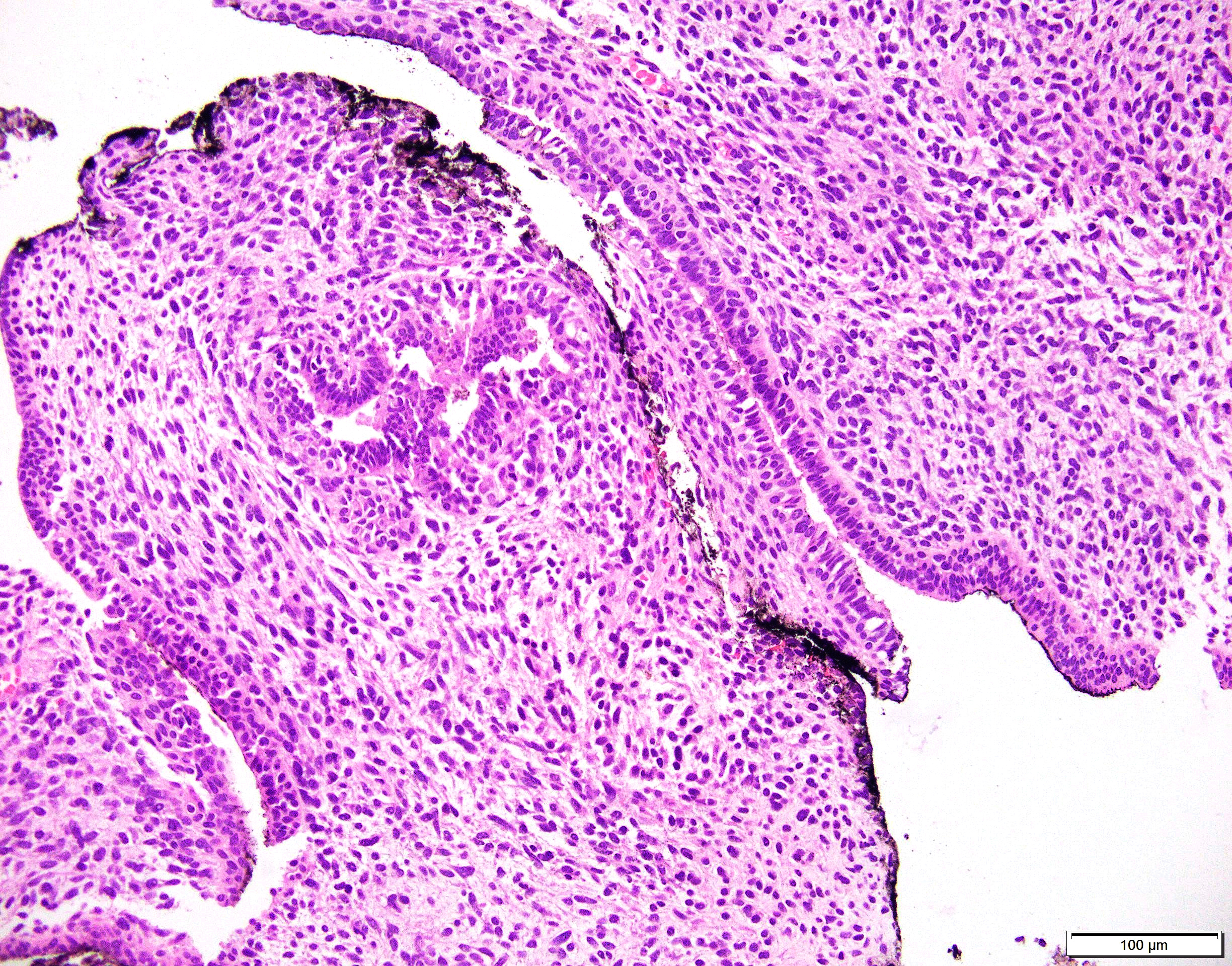
- Prostatic stromal tumour of uncertain malignant potential. H&E stain.

Prostatic stromal tumour of uncertain malignant potential (PSTUMP) is a rare tumour of the prostate gland stroma that may behave benign or like cancer.

It can be abbreviated STUMP; an abbreviation used for a uterine lesion of uncertain malignant potential.
