= Stumped (disambiguation) =

Stumped is a method of dismissing a batsman in the sport of cricket.

Stumped may also refer to:

- Stumped (film), a 2003 Bollywood film
- Stumped (radio programme), a BBC cricket radio programme

== See also ==
- Stump (disambiguation)
