= Milton Cross =

American radio announcer (1897–1975)

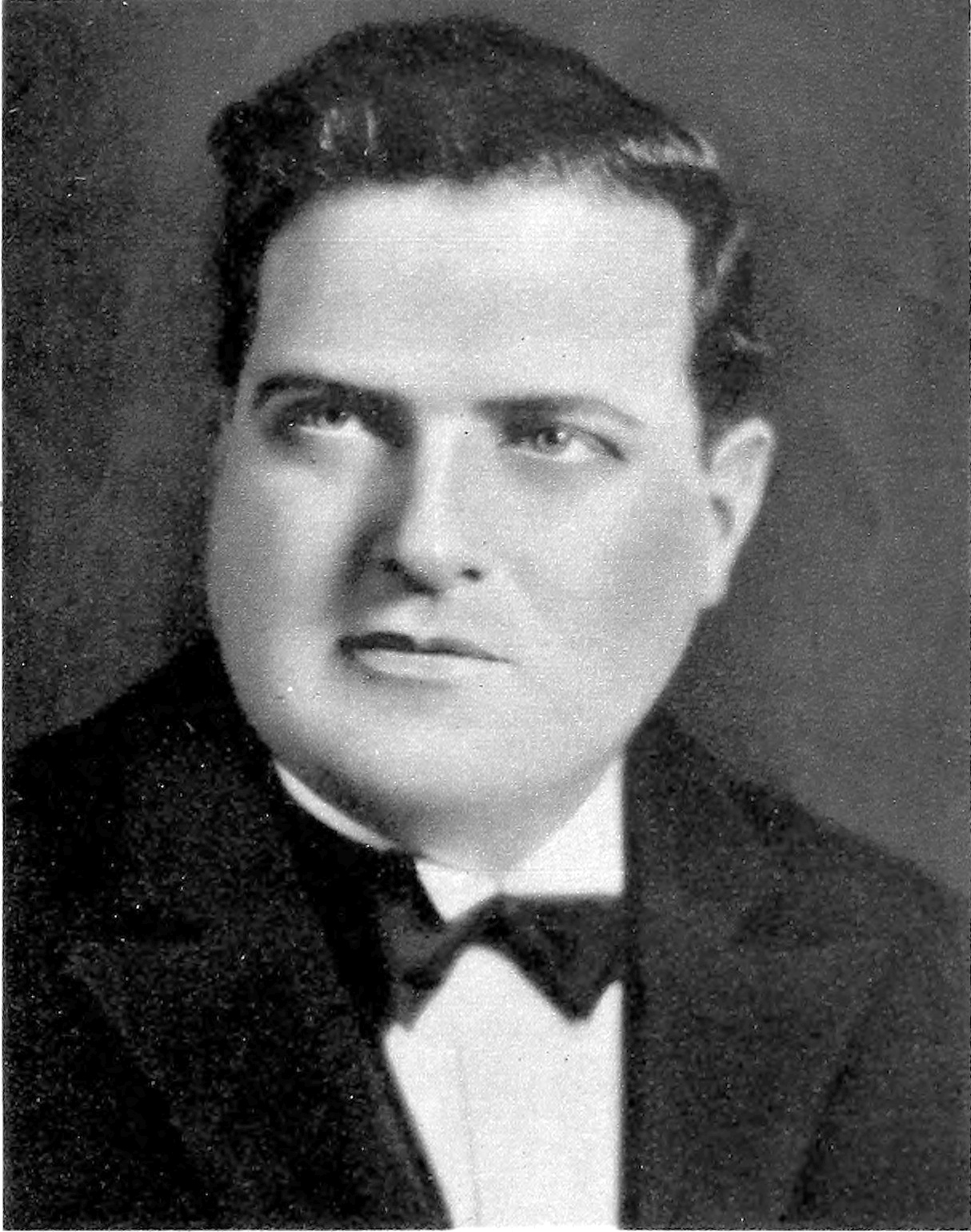
Milton J. Cross

Milton John Cross (April 16, 1897 – January 3, 1975) was an American radio announcer famous for his work on the NBC and ABC radio networks.

He was best known as the voice of the Metropolitan Opera, hosting its Saturday afternoon radio broadcasts for 43 years, from the time of their inception on December 25, 1931, until his death in 1975.

== Biography ==
=== Early career ===
Born in New York City, Milton Cross started his career just as network radio itself was in its earliest stages. He joined the New Jersey station WJZ in 1921, not just as an announcer but also as a singer, often engaging in recitals with the station's staff pianist, Keith McLeod. By 1927, WJZ had moved to Manhattan and had become the flagship station of the Blue Network of NBC's new national radio network. Cross' voice became familiar as he not only delivered announcements for the Blue Network but also hosted a number of popular programs. Cross was the announcer for the quiz program Information Please, and in the 1940s Cross hosted a Sunday morning show featuring child performers, called Coast To Coast on a Bus.

=== Metropolitan Opera broadcasts ===
From 1931 to 1975, Cross served as host for the weekly live broadcasts of the Metropolitan Opera, the job for which he is most remembered. His distinctive voice conveyed the excitement of live performances "from the stage of the Metropolitan Opera House in New York City" for generations of radio listeners. Initially, he broadcast from a seat in "Box 44" at the old Metropolitan Opera House at Broadway and 40th Street. In 1966, he introduced the radio audience to the Met's new home at Lincoln Center as he hosted a special broadcast of the opening night performance from a modern radio booth in the new house.

For 43 seasons, he was the main (usually sole) commentator. In the 1930s, he shared some broadcasts with other commentators, such as Deems Taylor, John B. Kennedy and Marcia Davenport, and Robert Woldrop replaced him (for unknown reasons) for the April 3, 1937 broadcast of Das Rheingold and the May 15, 1937 broadcast of Mignon. He also missed two later broadcasts (Rigoletto – February 10, 1973 and Norma – February 17, 1973) due to the death of his wife. Cross never retired but died in New York from a heart attack during the Met season of 1974–75. His first Met broadcast was Hansel and Gretel on December 25, 1931, and his last was of Turandot on December 28, 1974, 43 years and three days later. He was succeeded by Peter Allen, who had been his standby announcer.

== Popular culture ==
In 1940 NBC Radio launched The Chamber Music Society of Lower Basin Street, a satire of Milton Cross's dignified symphony broadcasts, with announcer Gene Hamilton burlesquing the Cross delivery and format. Hamilton peppered his remarks with jazz-musician slang and introduced dixieland jazz selections. The show's success resulted in Hamilton being promoted to a producer, and he was ultimately replaced by the very man the series was lampooning: Milton J. Cross. Cross proved extremely adept in the role, reading the scripted remarks with sharp comedy timing. His dialogue skills were noticed by film producer Joseph E. Levine, who hired Cross to narrate his silent-film compilation Gaslight Follies (1945).

Cross was parodied in the character of "Doktor Quilton Foss" in G.I. Carmen, an all-soldier musical stage production of the U.S. Army. Billed as "the Boilesk Voishin" the show toured occupied Europe from June 9, 1945, through January 24, 1946. Host "Foss" introduced the show and offered commentary throughout the evening's proceedings. Cross was later lampooned in Peter Schickele's album, P. D. Q. Bach: The Stoned Guest. Will Jordan played the role of "Milton Host", the host, who gave the commentary and told the listener what the synopsis of the act for the opera was.

== Books and recordings ==
Cross edited several popular editions of opera synopses and composer biographies, published by Doubleday in conjunction with the Met broadcasts. The earliest was entitled Milton Cross' Complete Stories of the Great Operas and was originally published in 1949 recounting the plots of 72 operas. It would be followed by More Stories of the Great Operas in 1971, and both titles would receive updated editions with "The New" appended to the title. He also co-authored with David Ewen Milton Cross' Encyclopedia of the Great Composers and their Music, a two-volume set of biographies for 78 composers, published in 1953.

Cross was also featured as narrator on several records, including:

- Peter and the Wolf, 4 78-rpm discs, c. 1950, Musicraft Records M 65 302–305
- Milton Cross Explains, 2 discs each, Ottenheimer Publishers/Cabot Records 1958
  - The Instruments of the Orchestra CAB 4021
  - The Magic of Music CAB 4022

== Death ==
A native New Yorker, Cross died in New York City where he had lived all his life. He is interred at Kensico Cemetery in Valhalla, New York.
