= Smooth muscle tumor of uncertain malignant potential =

Type of uterine tumor

Smooth muscle tumor of uncertain malignant potential, abbreviated STUMP, is an uncommon tumor of the uterine smooth muscle that may behave like a benign tumor or a cancerous tumor.

This tumor should not be confused with the prostatic stromal tumor of uncertain malignant potential which may be abbreviated the same way (STUMP).

The Bell criteria were developed to help categorize them and differentiate them from their main differential diagnoses, leiomyosarcoma and uterine leiomyoma.

== Bell criteria ==
=== Atypia ===
- none
- minimal: smooth nuclei, smooth contours, minimal variation in nuclear size, shape, and evenly distributed chromatin
- moderate: many large, plump, irregular nuclei, 1-2 mitotic figures
- severe: obvious pleomorphism, enlarged bizarre nuclei with dense chromatin, giant cells, often multinucleated, enlarged, atypical nucleoli

=== Mitotic figures ===
Evaluation of the mitotic figures in a STUMP requires evaluation of 3 specific criteria

1. Hairy extensions of chromatin must be present, extending from a central clot-like dense mass of chromosomes. Hairy extensions from an empty center favor a non-mitosis. Count 4 sets of 10 fields in the area of highest mitotic activity and use the highest count
2. No nuclear membrane
3. Rule out lymphocytes, mast cells, stripped nuclei, degenerated cells, and precipitated hematoxylin.

=== Necrosis ===
Coagulative tumor cell necrosis is common in clinically malignant smooth muscle cell tumors. It consists of an abrupt transition between necrotic cells and preserved cells. Ghost nuclei from necrotic cells are often seen, but inflammatory cells are uncommon. Hyalinizing necrosis is more common in leiomyomas. It consists of a zone of hyalinized collagen between dead cells and preserved cells, commonly eosinophilic. If dead nuclei present, they are uniform and the chromatin is often. Necrosis secondary to ulceration in submucous leiomyomas features acute inflammatory cells and a peripheral reparative process, whereas ghost outlines of nuclei are usually inconspicuous or absent.

=== Algorithm ===
- Bell's criteria do not apply to extrauterine tumors
- No or mild atypia, no tumor cell necrosis ⇒ leiomyoma. If 5 or more mitotic figures are present in 10 high powered fields but the behavior still appears benign, may append “with significant mitotic activity”.
- Moderate to severe atypia without tumor cell necrosis
  - atypical leiomyoma if < 10 mitotic figures per high power field or
  - leiomyosarcoma if ≥ 10 mitotic figures per high power field
- Moderate to severe atypia and tumor cell necrosis ⇒ leiomyosarcoma (mitotic figures don’t matter).

== See also ==
- Prostatic stromal tumor of uncertain malignant potential
