= Stump Pond =

Stump Pond refer to:

- Stump Pond (Pembroke, Massachusetts)
- Northern portion of Balch Pond
