= Stump and Stumpy =

US tap dance/comedy/acting duo

Stump and Stumpy were a tap dance/comedy/acting duo popular from the mid-1930s to the 1950s, consisting of James "Stump" Cross and either Eddie Hartman or Harold J. Cromer as "Stumpy". Their act was mostly jazz tap and comedy expressed through song and movement.

== History ==
James "Jimmy" Cross and Edward "Eddie" Hartman traveled around the United States, managed by Nat Nazarro, on what was often called the "Black Vaudeville" circuit. On the circuit, Cross met Norma Catherine Greve, with whom he had a daughter, June Cross (born in 1954). Cross was cast in the United States Army's This Is the Army (1943) film, with William Wycoff as his "partner". Stump and Stumpy's first big success was appearing in the movie Boarding House Blues (1948), after which Hartman had become unreliable as a performer and was replaced by Cromer.

== Appearances ==
- Apollo Theater, Harlem, New York City, Cab Calloway headlining (May 17–23, 1940)
- Flatbush Theatre, Brooklyn, New York, Duke Ellington headlining (Nov. 28-Dec. 4, 1940)
- Windsor Theatre, New York City (Nov. 28-Dec. 4, 1940)
- Regal Theatre, Chicago, the Inkspots headlining (Nov. 8, 1942)
- The Strand, New York City, Billie Holiday headlining with Count Basie (1948)
- Cromer was the M.C. for numerous Irvin Feld-produced rock and roll package tours in the late 1950s. He danced with LaVern Baker as she sang "Jim Dandy" and thus was billed as Harold "Jim Dandy" Cromer for most of these tours.

== Filmography ==
- *Nautical Knights (1938), a short film
- Ship Ahoy (1942)
- This is the Army (1943)
- Boarding House Blues (1948)

== Television ==
- Cavalcade of Bands (1950)

== Worked with ==
- Steve Allen
- Count Basie
- Milton Berle
- Irving Berlin
- Cab Calloway
- Duke Ellington
- Dizzy Gillespie
- Billie Holiday
- The Ink Spots
- Martin and Lewis
- Frank Sinatra

== See also ==
- James Cross at IMDb
- Stump and Stumpy Allmusic
- Secret Daughter. PBS.
- Cullen, Frank; Hackman, Florence; McNeilly, Donald (2007). "Stump and Stumpy". Vaudeville, Old & New. ISBN 9780415938532.
