= Berry Brothers =

American dance trio

The Berry Brothers were an American "exotic, acrobatic soft shoe dance" trio, active in the entertainment business for over 30 years. The trio was composed of Ananias (Nyas, "King of the Strut"), James and Warren Berry.

== History ==
Ananias John Willington "Nyas" Berry Jr. (August 18, 1913 – October 5, 1951) and James Gerald Berry (July 9, 1915 – January 28, 1969) were born to Ananias John Willington Berry Sr. and Redna Ross Berry in New Orleans. As early as 1919 the two brothers already performed in Chicago and then in Denver where the family settled and the younger Warren Joseph Berry (December 25, 1922 – August 10, 1996) was born.

In 1924 the family moved to Los Angeles, where as child actors Nyas, James and then Warren appeared in several films.

In 1929 Nyas and James formed the dance duo "The Berry Brothers." They appeared with Duke Ellington in "Rhythmania" at the Cotton Club. That same year they traveled to London and were featured performers in the critically acclaimed all-African-American revue Blackbirds of 1928. They were the first African American act at the Copacabana in 1929. They appeared in the musical "Rhapsody In Black" in 1931.

The act supported the entire family and their father Ananias was upset when 19-year-old Nyas left the act in 1932 to marry 27-year-old Valaida Snow, a popular African-American entertainer. Ananias replaced him with Warren. Ananias disapproved that his son married a woman eight years older so he investigated Valaida. He discovered she had been previously married to Knappy Brown, and they hadn't divorced. This caused a scandal in the press until Valaida provided documents that she had divorced Brown, but Nyas and Valaida split up shortly after. When Nyas' marriage had dissolved in 1935 he talked his brothers into forming a Berry Brothers act consisting of the trio.

In 1938, at the Cotton Club there was a legendary dance face-off between the Nicholas Brothers and the Berry Brothers. By some accounts the Berry Brothers were more athletic but the Nicholas Brothers were better overall performers – better at pleasing the crowd.

At the peak of their success, in the 1940s, the Berry Brothers also performed their routines in some Hollywood movies. They appeared twice in Panama Hattie (1942), once solo and once accompanying singer Lena Horne.

The experience of the Berry Brothers came to a sudden end when Nyas died in 1951 of heart failure.

James and Warren continued to perform together or individually for a few more years. James died in 1969, and Warren in 1996 after working for over 15 years as a film editor.

== Filmography ==
- $50,000 Reward (1924) - Nyas Berry
- Happy Days (1924) - short - James Berry
- The Blow Up (1924) - short - James Berry
- Oh, Teacher! (1924) - short - James Berry
- Low Bridge (1924) - short - James Berry
- Here He Comes (1924) - short - James Berry
- Speed Boys (1924) - short - James Berry
- Don't Fall (1924) - short - James Berry
- Baby Blues (1925) - short - James Berry
- Happy Days (1926) - short - James Berry
- Oh Boy (1927) - short - Nyas & Warren Berry
- The Newlyweds' Christmas Party (1927) - short - Nyas Berry
- San Francisco (1936) - Nyas Berry
- The Music Goes 'Round (1936) - Nyas Berry
- Lady Be Good (1941) - The Berry Brothers (Nyas, James & Warren)
- Panama Hattie (1942) - The Berry Brothers (Nyas, James & Warren)
- Boarding House Blues (1948) - The Berry Brothers (Nyas, James & Warren)
- You're My Everything (1949) - The Berry Brothers (Nyas, James & Warren)
