= Harold J. Cromer =

Vaudeville dancer and comedian

- Born: June 21, 1922; Manhattan, New York City, U.S.
- Died: June 8, 2013 (aged 90); Manhattan, New York City, U.S.
- Occupations: Vaudevillian, emcee, dancer, choreographer, comedian
- Years active: 1939–2013
- Known for: Stumpy in the dance/comedy/acting duo Stump and Stumpy

Harold J. "Stumpy" Cromer (June 21, 1922 – June 8, 2013) was an American vaudevillian, emcee, dancer, choreographer, and comedian. He was known as "Stumpy" in the dance/comedy/acting duo Stump and Stumpy.

== Biography ==
Born in 1922 in Manhattan, Harold grew up in Hell's Kitchen, New York. His father, William Cromer (a longshoreman worker) and mother, Hattie Bell DeWalt, were born in Newberry, South Carolina.

Cromer was a self-taught dancer who was known early on for tapping on roller skates. As a teenager, Harold earned a role on Broadway in the 1939 Cole Porter musical, Du Barry Was a Lady, starring Ethel Merman, Bert Lahr, and Betty Grable. Following a long road tour, Cromer returned to Broadway's Broadhurst Theatre to perform in Richard Kollmar's musical Early to Bed (1943), with music by Fats Waller. Cromer sang and danced in the 1938 film Swing!, directed by Oscar Micheaux, one of the first of its kind for having an all Black cast. Cromer appeared in other films over the years, including The Cotton Club and Paper Soldiers.

Harold Cromer, was widely known as "Stumpy", half of the vaudevillian duo Stump and Stumpy, performing antic dance routines in clubs around the country after World War II and later on major America television networks. From the 1930s into the 1950s, Stump and Stumpy were among the top comedy teams to play the black theater and nightclub circuit — including the Apollo Theater in Harlem. Stumpy and Stumpy were the headliners along with the 5 Platters and the Host of the night, Joe Lewis, for the opening night of the Moulin Rouge, the first interracial hotel in Las Vegas. They also appeared at the Paramount Theater and the Copacabana.

Stump and Stumpy sang and danced, and clowned while performing skits with great precision, often to the music of jazz orchestras, frequently performing on the same bill with the likes of Duke Ellington, Billie Holiday, Count Basie, Frank Sinatra, Ella Fitzgerald and Sarah Vaughan. With the emergence of television in the 1950s, the pair appeared on the Milton Berle Show and Steve Allen variety shows and occasionally in dramatic series, including Dragnet and Gunsmoke.

Stump and Stumpy are responsible for Dizzy Gillespie's famous bent horn. In his autobiography, To Be or Not to Bop, Gillespie quotes "...it was my wife’s birthday so we had a party and invited all the guys... When I got back to the club after making this interview, Stump ‘n Stumpy has been fooling around on the bandstand, and one had pushed the other, and he’s fallen back onto my horn. Instead of the horn just falling, the bell bent."

It is widely noted that the Stump and Stumpy act was stolen without credit by other artists of the time. In the PBS documentary Secret Daughter, Jerry Lewis admitted, "The black community, they loved the clown. They knew of what I took from their culture, which was their comedic sense of timing, their ability for self deprecating humor, which is everything I used... " about Lewis and Dean Martin's routine.

In 1978, Cromer returned to Broadway in the play The American Dance Machine, touring many cities in the U.S., Japan, and Europe. The play, named for the touring dance company, specialized in reviving dance numbers from musicals of the past. Cromer was the Oleo, or Intermission performer.

Cromer led as the Master of Ceremony for touring rock 'n' roll shows, including Biggest Show of Stars, produced by Irvin Feld. For years, Cromer introduced performers like Paul Anka, Bobby Darin, Bill Haley and His Comets, Aretha Franklin, Nat King, Cole, James Brown and a young Stevie Wonder.

Cromer died June 8, 2013, in Manhattan, aged 90.

== Filmography ==
- Ship Ahoy (1942) (uncredited)
- Boarding House Blues (1948)
- Mister Rock and Roll (1957)
- The Cotton Club (1984)
- Paper Soldiers (2002)
