= Una Mae Carlisle =

American jazz singer, pianist, and songwriter (1915–1956)

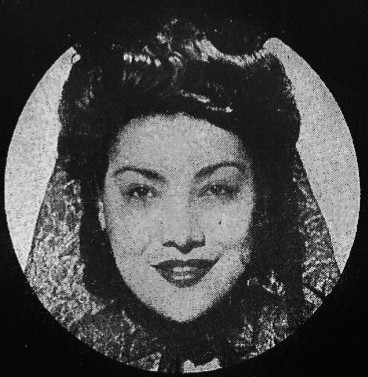
- Una Mae Carlisle, c. 1945

Background information
- Born: December 26, 1915; Zanesville, Ohio, United States
- Died: November 7, 1956 (aged 40) Harlem, New York, United States
- Genres: Jazz, swing, stride
- Occupations: Singer, pianist, composer
- Instruments: Vocals, piano

Una Mae Carlisle (December 26, 1915 – November 7, 1956) was an American jazz singer, pianist, and songwriter.

== Early life ==
Carlisle was born in Zanesville, Ohio, the daughter of Mellie and Edward Carlisle. She was of African and Native American descent. Trained to play piano by her mother, she was performing in public by age three.

== Career ==
Still a child, she performed regularly on radio station WHIO (AM) in Dayton, Ohio.

In 1932, while she was still in her teens, Fats Waller discovered Carlisle while she worked as a local Cincinnati, Ohio, performer live and on radio. Her piano style was very much influenced by Waller's; she played in a boogie-woogie/stride style and incorporated humor into her sets.

She played solo from 1937, touring Europe repeatedly and recording with Waller late in the 1930s.

In the 1940s, Carlisle recorded as a leader for Bluebird Records, with sidemen such as Lester Young, Benny Carter, and John Kirby. She had a longtime partnership with producer/publisher/manager Joe Davis, which began after her contract with Bluebird expired. Her records under Davis included performances from Ray Nance, Budd Johnson, and Shadow Wilson.

She also saw success as a songwriter. Her 1941 song "Walkin' By The River" made her "the first black woman to have a composition appear on a Billboard chart". Cab Calloway and Peggy Lee were among those who covered her tunes. She had her own radio show, The Una Mae Carlisle Radio Show on WJZ-ABC, making her the "first black American to host a national radio show"; and television programs in the 1940s.

== Personal life ==
Carlisle was married to Johnnie Bradford, a former merchant marine. They married in September 11, 1941. Bradford was the owner of Gee-Haw Stables, a jazz venue in Harlem.

Carlisle suffered from chronic mastoiditis, requiring repeated surgeries and hospitalizations.

== Partial discography ==
Partial list of phonograph recordings:

- "Tain't Yours" b/w "Without You Baby" (Beacon, 1944)

=== Albums ===
- Davis Presents Una Mae Carlisle (Davis, ca. 1940s)

Compilations:

- 1938-1941 (Classics, 2002)
- 1941-1944 (Classics, 2002)
- 1944-1950 (Classics, 2002)

== Filmography ==
- Boarding House Blues (1948)
