= Penny Penguin =

Penny Penguin may refer to:

- "Penny Penguin", a character on the Milton the Monster cartoon
- "Penny Penguin", a Raffi 2024 song/album
- "Penny the Penguin", a fictional female character in The Koala Brothers
