= All-American News =

Film production company

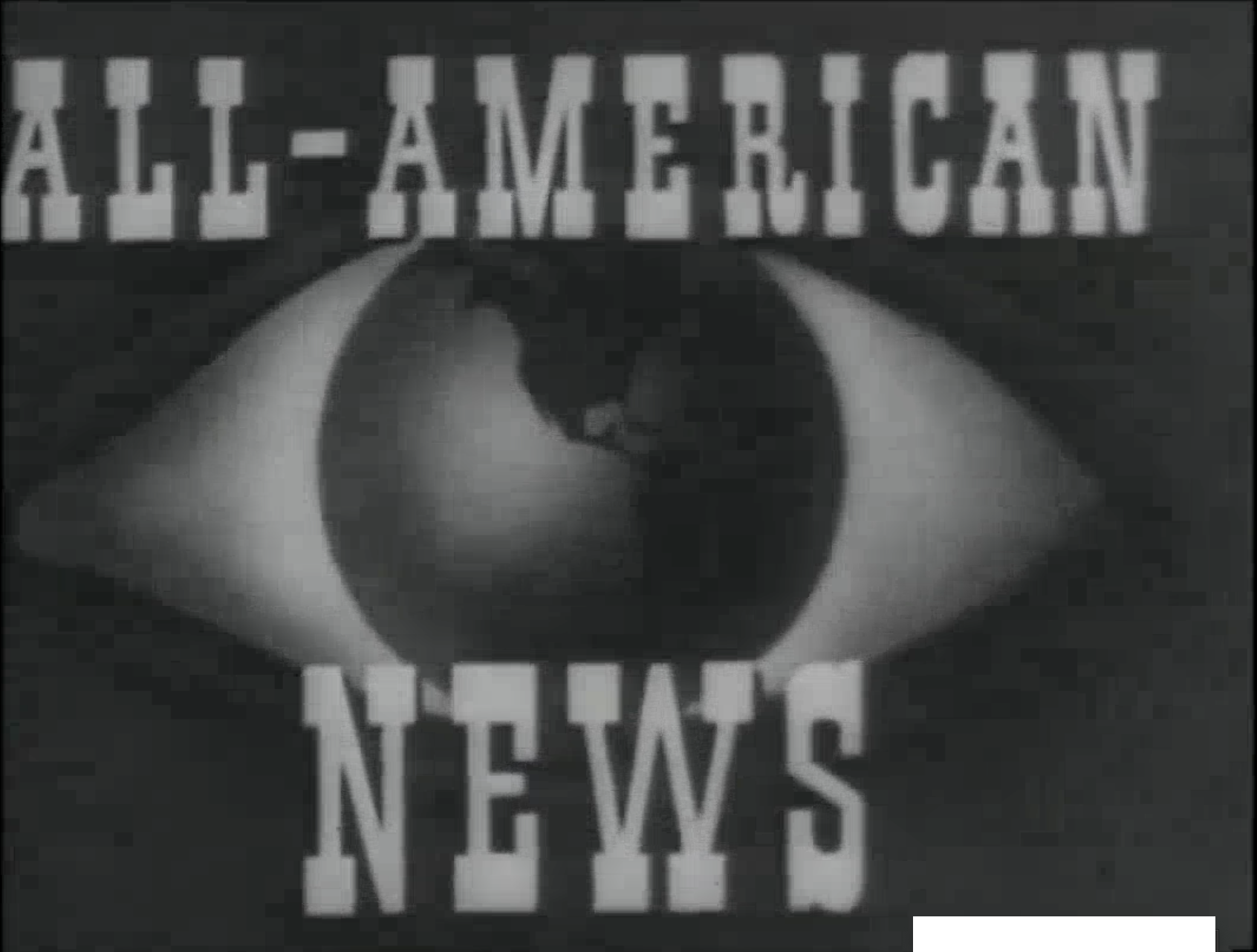
Title card from opening of All American News

All-American News was a film production company in the U.S. bringing newsreels and entertainment films to African American audiences. The first reels were produced in their headquarters in Chicago and premiered in November of 1942. The newsreels were shown in 150 black theaters from across the country. They were the first newsreels to ever be produced for black audiences. The intention behind them was to encourage African Americans to join and support the war effort as well as share their perspective on events taking place around the world. The films were typically 7 minutes in length and covered several topics with the main focus being progress and achievements of African American service members.

Emmanuel M. Glucksman, a former Universal short subject producer and exhibitor, lead production for All-American News films for African American audiences. He was paired with young African American filmmaker William D. Alexander, who worked on the newsreel production team, narrated, and interviewed. Claude Barnett, an experienced journalist also helped produce the films. Josh Binney directed some of the films. Some of these films included Chicago After Dark and Lucky Gamblers.

The Library of Congress has a collection of 35 All-American newsreels and films released from 1942 to 1945.

== Production ==
While being headquartered in Chicago, filming was conducted across the United States. Newsreels were filmed with camera crews located and operating in major cities such as Atlanta, Baltimore, Chicago, Cincinnati, Cleveland, Los Angeles, New York, Pittsburgh, and San Francisco. Additional film material was purchased from freelance camera crews in other cities. Printing of the newsreels were handled at the former New York motion film lab, DuArt Film Laboratories, that shut down operations in 2021.

== Films ==
=== Chicago After Dark ===
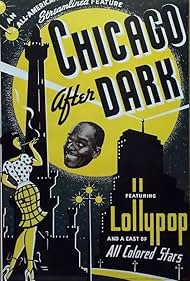
Poster for the film, "Chicago After Dark"

Chicago After Dark is a 23 minute American comedy film from 1946. It was directed by Josh Binney. A poster for the film advertised it as "An All-American Streamlined Feature" with "Lollypop Jones and a cast of all colored stars." The Museum of the Moving Image has a lobby card from the film. It was an All-American News production.

The film is part of the Black Film Center collection at Indiana University. In 2000, Chicago After Dark featured at the Harlem Week Black Film Festival; according to the festival, it was the film's first showing in forty years. The plot description read, "A lady escapes from the 'nut' house in this comedy classic."

Cast

- Lollypop Jones
- Allen McMillen
- Artie Belle McGinty
- Tops & Wilda (Thomas Lee and Wilda Crawford)
- Edgar Lewis Morton
- James Dunsmore

=== Lucky Gamblers ===
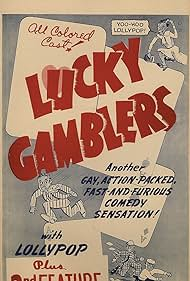
Poster for the film, "Lucky Gamblers"

Lucky Gamblers is a 1946 American action comedy short film. It was advertised as having an "all-colored cast of stars". It was an All-American News production, directed by Josh Binney. The film follows the character of Lollypop Jones' who begins working at the 7-11 club as a waitress when she hears gamblers plotting to take ownership of the club and she steps in to try stop the plot.

Cast

- Sybil Lewis (actress)
- Lollypop Jones
- J. Augustus Smith

== Filmography ==
- The Negro Sailor (1945)
- It Happened in Harlem (1945)
- Chicago After Dark (1946)
- Lucky Gamblers (1946)
- Midnight Menace (1946)
- Boarding House Blues (1948)
- Killer Diller (1948 film) (1948)
- The Joint is Jumping (1949)
