= Midnight Menace =

Midnight Menace may refer to:

- Midnight Menace (1937 film), a British thriller film
- Midnight Menace (1946 film), a short American musical film
