= The Joint is Jumpin' (film) =

1949 American film

The Joint is Jumping is a musical comedy film from 1949. A "race film" with an African American cast of performers, it was one of several such films produced by the All-American News film company and directed by Josh Binney. It was written by Hal Seeger. The 4-reel film was previewed in the Chicago Defender October 16, 1948.

The Phil Moore Four appeared in the film as well as a band called The All American Girl Band.

== Cast ==
- Rozelle Gayle
- Bob Howard
- Una Mae Carlisle
- Hadda Brooks
- Slick & Jack
- John Mason
- Charles Ray, who was white
- J. Patrick Patterson
- Mattie Weaver
- Gertrude Saunders
- John Oscar
- Frog Edwards
- Eddie South
- Phil Moore Four
- The Jubalaires
- The All American Girl Band
- Doris Ratliff
- George Lawson and his band
