= Milton the Monster =

- Milton, pictured during the show's opening credits.
- Also known as: The Milton the Monster Show
- Created by: Hal Seeger
- Directed by: Hal Seeger
- Voices of: Bob McFadden; Beverly Arnold; Dayton Allen; Herb Duncan; Larry Best
- Composer: Winston Sharples
- Country of origin: United States
- Original language: English
- No. of seasons: 1
- No. of episodes: 26

Production
- Producer: Hal Seeger
- Running time: 30 min.
- Production companies: Hal Seeger Productions, in association with the ABC Television Network

Original release
- Network: ABC
- Release: October 9, 1965 – September 8, 1968

Milton the Monster, also called The Milton the Monster Show, is an American Saturday-morning animated television series that ran on ABC from October 9, 1965, to September 8, 1968. It was produced and directed by Hal Seeger.

The setting of the series is a haunted house on Horror Hill. The series features Milton, a Frankenstein-like monster created by a mad scientist. Due to an error in the creation process, Milton is tender and good-natured instead of being sinister.

== Overview ==
The series starred Milton the Monster, a Frankenstein-looking monster with a flat-topped, seemingly hollow head which emitted various quantities of white steam or smoke based on his mood or situation. He was created by mad scientist Professor Montgomery Weirdo and his assistant Count Kook, who lived in a haunted house on Horror Hill. Milton is a smiling, good-natured fellow, thanks to the Professor having used too much "tincture of tenderness" as explained in the opening theme of each individual Milton the Monster segment. Milton was created not of individual body parts, but rather in a mold from such liquids as "essence of terror" and "sinister sauce." Out of fear of his creation destroying him, Professor Weirdo intended to add just a touch of the aforementioned tincture of tenderness to the mold, but Count Kook bumped the Professor's elbow, resulting in too much of the tincture being added to the mix. Milton's voice, which was based on the southern accent used by Jim Nabors in his television role as Gomer Pyle, was provided by Bob McFadden who also provided voices for Professor Weirdo's resident monsters:

- Heebie - a skull-faced, top hat-wearing ghoul with a Peter Lorre voice.
- Jeebie - a slow-witted, cyclopian, hairy green creature with a single sharp tooth that was often used to open soda cans.
- Mechanical Mike - A blue robot who only appears in one episode and some episodes of Fearless Fly. Milton accidentally destroys Mike while helping him with indigestion. But Milton manages to put him back together as a computer.

Professor Weirdo's nemesis was Professor Fruitcake, another mad scientist who lived in a castle on an opposite hill. Professor Fruitcake's major creation was Zelda the Zombie (who only appears in one episode). Other characters in the series included Fangenstein, a biker monster apparently inspired by Marlon Brando, his sidekick Abercrombie the Zombie (who is sometimes Milton's friend), and Professor Weirdo's aunt, the witchy Aunt Hagatha.

== Other features ==
Other features on the show included:

- Fearless Fly, starring an insect superhero similar to Hanna-Barbera's Atom Ant. One of the most popular segments of the Milton the Monster Show, Fearless Fly was, in reality, Hiram, an ordinary housefly. When danger threatens, he ducks into a nearby matchbox, dons a red sweater and changes into the superhero Fearless Fly by, in a reversal of Clark Kent, putting on a pair of super high-powered glasses. Fearless Fly, according to the opening, is more powerful than a speeding rocket and faster than a beam of light. No flyswatter can harm him, no flypaper can hold him and no insecticide can stop him. Fearless Fly's sole weakness is losing his glasses, which happens in most of the episodes. His chief nemesis is the 900-year-old Dr. Fu Manchu-inspired Dr. Goo Fee and his assistant, Gung Ho. Occasionally, Milton the Monster's Professor Weirdo makes an appearance to threaten Fearless Fly. Usually, Bob McFadden does the voices, such as the seductive Lady Deflyah.
- Flukey Luke, with a cowboy detective, his Irish-accented Native American companion, Two Feathers and his horse, Pronto. Flukey Luke was so named because of his dumb luck that allowed him to get the upper hand, despite being incredibly inept.
- Stuffy Durma the Millionaire Hobo, starring a nouveau-riche hobo who resisted the attempts of valet Bradley Brinkley to get some culture and breeding.
- Muggy-Doo Boy Fox, featuring a sly boy fox who often gets into trouble with his get-rich-quick schemes.
- Penny Penguin, starring a bratty penguin girl and her parents.

== Voice cast ==
Principal characters and voices:

- Bob McFadden: Milton the Monster, Professor Weirdo, Count Kook, Professor Fruitcake, Dr. Goo Fee, Gung Ho, Heebie, Jeebie, Fearless Fly, Horsey the Fly, Additional Voices, Narrator (Milton the Monster and Fearless Fly segments)
- Dayton Allen: Stuffy Durma, Bradley Brinkley, Chester Penguin
- Larry Best: Flukey Luke, Two Feathers, Additional Voices, Narrator (Flukey Luke segments)
- Herb Duncan: Muggy-Doo, Osh, Additional Voices
- Beverly Arnold: Beulah Penguin, Flora Fly
- Hetty Galen: Penny Penguin
- Zel DeCyr: Penny Penguin (in "There Auto Be a Law")
- Jack Mercer: Additional voices (uncredited)

== Episode list ==
=== Milton the Monster ===
No.	Title	Story	Animation	Scenics
1	"Zelda the Zombie"	(No credit)	Shamus Culhane	Robert Owen
2	"Boy Meets Ghoul"	Heywood Kling	Shamus Culhane	Robert Owen
3	"Monsters for Hire"	(No credit)	Ken Walker	Robert Owen
4	"Who Do Voodoo?"	(No credit)	I. Klein	Robert Owen
5	"The Pot Thickens"	Heywood Kling	Myron Waldman	Robert Owen
6	"Medium Undone"	(No credit)	Myron Waldman	Robert Owen
7	"Monster Mutiny"	(No credit)	Shamus Culhane	Frank Dorso
8	"Ghoul School"	(No credit)	Myron Waldman	Robert Owen
9	"Hector the Protector"	(No credit)	Shamus Culhane	Robert Owen
10	"Horrorbaloo"	(No credit)	Ken Walker	Robert Owen
11	"Goon Platoon"	(No credit)	Myron Waldman	Frank Dorso
12	"The Dummy Talks"	(No credit)	Myron Waldman	John Zago
13	"A Pie in the Sky"	(No credit)	Shamus Culhane	Robert Owen
14	"Monstrous Escape"	(No credit)	Myron Waldman	Frank Dorso
15	"Abercrombie the Zombie"	Heywood Kling	Shamus Culhane, Ray Seti	Robert Owen
16	"V for Vampire"	(No credit)	Myron Waldman	Robert Owen
17	"Monster vs. Mobster"	(No credit)	I. Klein	Robert Owen
18	"Witch Crafty"	(No credit)	Bill Ackerman	Robert Owen
19	"Camp Gitchy Gloomy"	(No credit)	Graham Place, Otto Feuer	Robert Owen
20	"The Hearse Thief"	(No credit)	Morey Reden	Frank Dorso
21	"Boo to You"	(No credit)	Graham Place, Otto Feuer	Robert Owen
22	"Kid Stuff"	(No credit)	Graham Place, Otto Feuer	Robert Owen
23	"Horror Scope"	(No credit)	I. Klein	Robert Owen
24	"The Flying Cup & Saucer"	(No credit)	Myron Waldman	Robert Owen
25	"Monster-Sitter"	(No credit)	Shamus Culhane	Robert Owen
26	"The Moon Goons"	(No credit)	James Tyer	Frank Dorso
27	"Think Shrink"	(No credit)	Morey Reden	Robert Owen
28	"Skullgaria Forever!"	(No credit)	Irving Dressler	Frank Dorso
29	"Crumby Mummy"	(No credit)	John Gentilella	John Zago
30	"Fort Fangenstein"	(No credit)	Irving Dressler	John Zago
31	"Batnap"	(No credit)	Ken Walker	Robert Owen
32	"Dunkin' Treasure"	(No credit)	Bill Ackerman	Robert Owen
33	"Monstrous Monster"	(No credit)	Myron Waldman	Frank Dorso
34	"The Mummy's Thumb"	(No credit)	Myron Waldman	Robert Owen

=== Fearless Fly ===
No.	Title	Animation	Scenics
1	"Trick or Treatment"	John Gentilella	Robert Owen
2	"Horse Shoo Fly"	Shamus Culhane	Frank Dorso
3	"Fatty Karate"	Myron Waldman	Frank Dorso
4	"Captain Fligh"	Shamus Culhane	Frank Dorso
5	"The Goofy Dr. Goo Fee"	Myron Waldman	(no credit)
6	"Sly Fly"	John Gentilella	Robert Owen
7	"Throne for a Loss"	Irving Dressler	Frank Dorso
8	"The Bomb's Rush"	Shamus Culhane	Robert Owen
9	"Fly Hijack"	Irving Dressler	Frank Dorso
10	"Si Si Fly"	Otto Feuer, Graham Place	Frank Dorso
11	"The House-Fly Guest"	John Gentilella	Frank Dorso
12	"Invincible vs. Invisible"	Myron Waldman	Frank Dorso
13	"Fly by Might"	Myron Waldman	Frank Dorso
14	"The Sphinx Jinx"	Otto Feuer, Graham Place	Frank Dorso
15	"The Spider Spitter"	Shamus Culhane	(no credit)
16	"Fearless Fly Meets the Monsters"	Shamus Culhane	(no credit)
17	"Martians Meet their Match"	Myron Waldman	Frank Dorso
18	"Let's Phase It"	Shamus Culhane	(no credit)
19	"Under Waterloo"	Shamus Culhane	(no credit)
20	"Lady Deflyah"	Shamus Culhane	Frank Dorso
21	"Robinson Shoesole"	Irving Dressler	Frank Dorso
22	"Private Fly"	Myron Waldman	Frank Dorso
23	"Stage Plight"	Myron Waldman	John Zago
24	"Safari Harry"	John Gentilella	Robert Owen
25	"Ferocious Fly"	John Gentilella	Frank Dorso
26	"Napoleon Bonafly"	Myron Waldman	Robert Owen

=== Flukey Luke ===
No.	Title	Story	Animation	Scenics
1	"Loot Pursuit"	Kin Platt	Myron Waldman	Frank Dorso
2	"Missin' Masters"	Kin Platt	Myron Waldman	Frank Dorso
3	"Tired Gun"	Kin Platt	Myron Waldman	Frank Dorso
4	"Palace Malice"	(no credit)	Tom Golden, Arnie Levy	Robert Owen
5	"Violin Violence"	(no credit)	Tom Golden, Arnie Levy	Frank Dorso

=== Muggy Doo, Boy Fox ===
No.	Title	Animation	Scenics
1	"Crumb Bumming"	Myron Waldman	Frank Dorso
2	"You Auto Be In Pictures"	Myron Waldman	Frank Dorso
3	"Gogh Van Gogh"	Myron Waldman	Frank Dorso
4	"Muggy Doo Or Die"	Myron Waldman	Frank Dorso
5	"From Riches To Rags"	Myron Waldman	Frank Dorso
6	"Fortune Kooky"	I. Klein	Frank Dorso

=== Penny Penguin ===
No.	Title	Animation
1	"There Auto Be A Law"	Tom Golden, Arnie Levy
2	"Sickened Honeymoon"	Tom Golden, Arnie Levy
3	"Penny Ante"	Irving Dressler

=== Stuffy Derma ===
No.	Title	Animation	Scenics
1	"Suit Yourself"	James Tyer	Frank Dorso
2	"From Wrecks To Riches"	James Tyer	Frank Dorso
3	"Hobo Hootenanny"	James Tyer	Frank Dorso
4	"Nuggets To You"	James Tyer	Frank Dorso

== DVD release ==
On March 20, 2007, Shout! Factory released the complete series on a 4-DVD set.

== See also ==
- Batfink
