= The Clark Brothers =

American dance double act

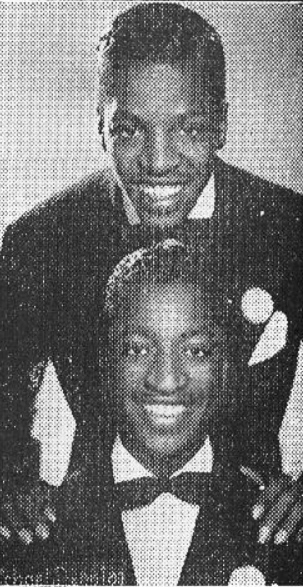
The Clark Brothers in a 1944 advertisement

The Clark Brothers, consisting of Steve (1924 – February 2017) and James ("Jimmy") (23 July 1922 – 30 October 2009), were an American double act, who achieved success in Britain in the postwar period. They were thought to be the last of the "brothers" acts of tap-dancing's golden age. During their career, they appeared alongside Frank Sinatra and The Beatles, and opened The Sands in Las Vegas. The Clark Brothers also played at Madison Square Gardens and the Apollo Theatre in New York.

== Early lives ==
Born to parents Cornelius and Octavia, the Clark Brothers grew up in poverty in Philadelphia with sisters Fredretha, Lorraine, and Evelyn, and a brother, Cornelius. The brothers were cousins of Sammy Davis Jr. By the age of 12, Steve, the youngest, was a seasoned soloist, singing and dancing. The two brothers' first engagement was at the Cotton Club in Harlem, when they were 15 and 17. In 1948, Frank Sinatra suggested they go to Britain with a show, and the country became their permanent home.

== Career ==
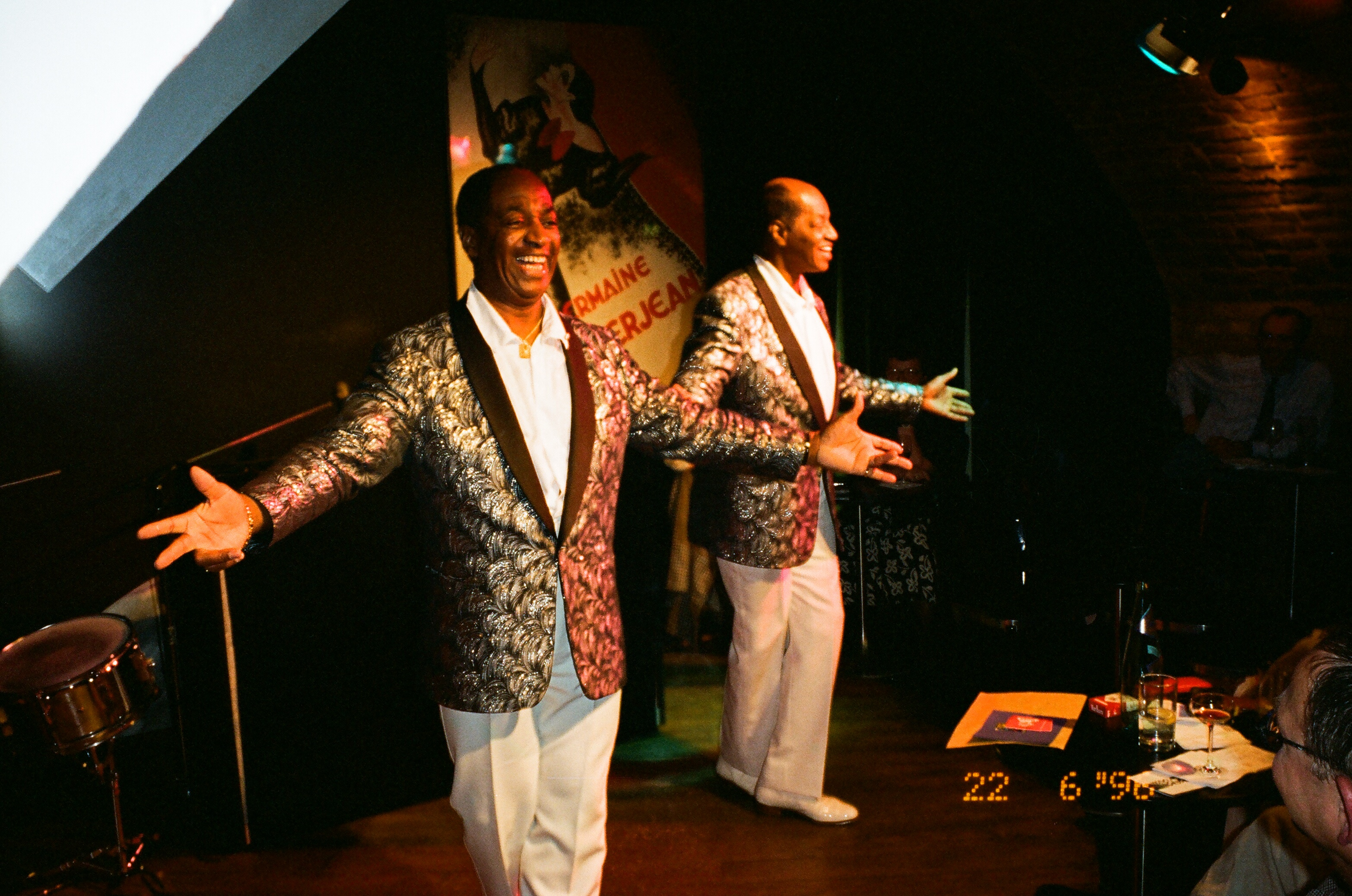
The Clark Brothers in 1996

The Clark Brothers gave their first British performance for King George VI, and became favorites in working men's clubs. They wrote hits for Max Bygraves, and appeared at the London Palladium, in addition to opening a "University of Showbusiness" in London, where Cliff Richard and Bonnie Langford were among their pupils. The Brothers were a regular dance act on the QE2 cruise liner in the mid-1980s, and were always very approachable to crew & passengers whilst walking around the Ship.( ex crew member)

== Personal lives and deaths ==
Jimmy died on 30 October 2009, at the age of 87. He and his brother Steve had lived together in Dunstable. Jimmy's funeral took place on 17 November at St Peter's Priory in Dunstable.

Steve latterly lived in Brinsworth House, the retirement home run by the Entertainment Artistes' Benevolent Fund. He died in February 2017 at the age of 93. At St Mary's Church in Twickenham, his funeral featured a performance by Miquel Brown, with tributes from Simon Callow and Roger de Courcey. Steve was buried next to Jimmy in Dunstable. The brothers were both members of the Grand Order of Water Rats until their deaths.

== Film and television appearances ==
- Super Drumming (German TV series) (1989) https://www.youtube.com/watch?v=gTfbt0_Xzso&t=365s
- The Good Old Days (1983)
- Sez Les (1973)
- Saturday Variety (1972)
- Sunday Night at the London Palladium (1967)
- The Black & White Minstrel Show (1967)
- Blackpool Night Out (1965)
- The Ed Sullivan Show (1965)
- Club Night (1964)
- The Royal Variety Show (1963)
- The Colgate Comedy Hour (1952–1955)
- The George Jessel Show (1954)
- Killer Diller (1948)

== See also ==
- Tap dance
