= The Devil's Daughter (1973 film) =

- Genre: Horror
- Written by: Colin Higgins
- Directed by: Jeannot Szwarc
- Starring: Shelley Winters; Belinda Montgomery; Robert Foxworth; Jonathan Frid
- Music by: Laurence Rosenthal
- Country of origin: United States
- Original language: English

Production
- Producers: Edward K. Milkis; Thomas L. Miller
- Production locations: Pacific Grove, California; Paramount Studios - 5555 Melrose Avenue, Hollywood, Los Angeles, California
- Cinematography: J.J. Jones
- Editor: Rita Roland
- Running time: 74 minutes
- Production company: Paramount Television

Original release
- Network: ABC
- Release: January 9, 1973

The Devil's Daughter is a 1973 American made-for-television horror film starring Shelley Winters, Belinda Montgomery and Robert Foxworth. It originally aired as the ABC Movie of the Week on January 9, 1973.

It was an early screenwriting credit for Colin Higgins.

== Plot ==
Diane Shaw is a young woman who attends the funeral of her mother Alice Shaw. One of Alice's old friends, a wealthy woman named Lilith Malone, introduces her to a Satanic cult that Alice was part of before leaving it while Diane was a baby. The cult members have been keeping track of Diane (unbeknownst to her) throughout her childhood and teenage years, and believe her to be their "princess of darkness," insisting she take that role, which Diane rejects, horrified. Several strange things happen to Diane and her friends as the cult tries to take control over her. Diane eventually meets Steve Stone, a charming young man, and as she falls in love with him, feels she can defy the cult and live her own life. On her wedding day, Diane learns, to her shock and horror, that there are sinister conditions for the marriage, making her destiny unavoidable when she finds out that Steve is really the demon prince the cult had arranged her to marry.

== Cast ==
- Shelley Winters as Lilith Malone
- Belinda Montgomery as Diane Shaw
- Robert Foxworth as Steve Stone
- Jonathan Frid as Mr. Howard
- Martha Scott as Mrs. Stone
- Joseph Cotten as Judge Weatherby
- Barbara Sammeth as Susan Sanford
- Diane Ladd as Alice Shaw
- Lucille Benson as Janet Poole
- Thelma Carpenter as Margaret Poole
- Abe Vigoda as Alikhine
- Ian Wolfe as Father MacHugh
- Robert Cornthwaite as Pastor Dixon
- Rozelle Gayle as Fedora
- Lillian Bronson as Landlady

== Production ==
The movie was filmed in Pacific Grove, California and Paramount Studios in Hollywood, California.

== Reception ==
The Los Angeles Times said it "had about as much suspense as the Nixon-McGovern race."

In The New York Times, Howard Thompson wrote:

Subtract the baby from Rosemary's Baby, transplant those strange, Manhattan cliff‐dwellers to sunny California and you have “The Devil's Daughter,” one of the better made‐for‐TV movies...

Most of these TV films are a waste of time. But this 90‐minute witchcraft thriller provides trenchant suspense. Why? Simply because this occult dip is so well done.

== Legacy ==
Colin Higgins later described the script as "just a job". However producers Edward K. Milkis and Thomas L. Miller enjoyed working with Higgins and commissioned him to write an Alfred Hitchcock style thriller. This became Silver Streak.

== See also ==
- List of American films of 1973
