= Hal Seeger =

American animated cartoon producer and director

- Born: Harold Seeger; May 16, 1917; New York City, U.S.
- Died: March 13, 2005 (aged 87); New York City, U.S.
- Occupation: Animator

Harold Seeger (May 16, 1917 – March 13, 2005) was an American animated cartoon producer and director who owned his own studio, the Hal Seeger Studio (Hal Seeger Productions). He is most famous as the creator of the 1960s animated series Batfink, Milton the Monster and Fearless Fly. From the 1930s into the 1950s, he was also active as a comics writer and artist, notably including the Betty Boop comic strip and Leave It to Binky.

== Biography ==
Born in Brooklyn, New York, Seeger began working as an animator for Fleischer Studios in the mid 1930s. His credits included "A Kick in Time" for the Color Classics series and a sequence for the feature film Mr. Bug Goes to Town.

During the later part of the 1940s, he worked as a screenwriter for a series of movies featuring well known Black performers, including the 1947 Cab Calloway musical Hi-De-Ho and two films featuring Dusty Fletcher and Moms Mabley, Killer Diller and Boarding House Blues". In 1950 he wrote and directed a Warner Bros. short subject Hands Tell the Story featuring a story told with only human hands.

In 1962, his studio produced and syndicated 100 new Out of the Inkwell cartoons, based on the Koko the Clown character, originally created by Fleischer Studios. Seeger then took control of animating the opening & ending sequences for The Porky Pig Show in 1964.

He is best known for having produced the animated programs Milton the Monster (1965–66) and Batfink (1966–67). He also produced Fearless Fly (1965), the adventures of a bumpkin fly who is physically helpless and practically blind without his trademark oversize rectangular glasses, but on putting them on he is invincible. This cartoon was a feature of The Milton the Monster Show.

Seeger died on March 13, 2005, at the age of 87.

== Production list ==
- Out of the Inkwell (1962)
- Batfink (1966-67)
- The Porky Pig Show (1964 (opening titles)
- Tobor the Eight Man (1965-66, distribution)
- The Milton the Monster Show (1965–66)
  - Muggy-Doo
- Popeye Meets the Man Who Hated Laughter (1972) (TV special)
