= Coast to Coast (1980 film) =

1980 film by Joseph Sargent

- Theatrical release poster
- Directed by: Joseph Sargent
- Written by: Stanley Weiser
- Produced by: Jon Avnet; Steve Tisch
- Starring: Robert Blake; Dyan Cannon
- Cinematography: Mario Tosi
- Edited by: Patrick Kennedy; George Jay Nicholson
- Music by: Charles Bernstein
- Distributed by: Paramount Pictures
- Release date: October 3, 1980
- Running time: 94 minutes
- Country: United States
- Language: English
- Box office: $4.5 million

Coast to Coast is a 1980 American romantic comedy road movie starring Dyan Cannon and Robert Blake, directed by Joseph Sargent. The screenplay was written by Stanley Weiser. The original score was composed by Charles Bernstein. The film was primarily shot in and around Stockton and Farmington, California. It was Blake's first film in six years and first since his popular TV series Baretta left the airwaves.

The film follows Madie Levrington, a wealthy neurotic woman who escapes from a New York mental asylum, and hitches a ride back to California with moody down-on-his-luck cowboy trucker Charles Callahan. They fall in love with each other while on the run from bounty hunters and repo man Jules.

== Plot ==
Madie Levrington is a wealthy woman who is also neurotic. She was committed to a New York mental institution by her husband, Benjamin, in order to keep her from divorcing him and taking his money. She manages to escape and, in the process, hitches a ride on a livestock truck.

The truck is driven by Charles Callahan. Before realizing Madie is on his truck, he hears over his CB radio about her escape and a substantial reward for her return. This gets his attention as he is so in debt that he has Jules, a repo man after him to repossess his truck.

Behind Madie's back, Callahan meets up with people who are out to get her, and gets part of the reward money from Sal Klinger, the woman who leads them. At the same time, he is also slowly falling in love with her. He even teaches her to drive the truck (frantically, after he was hit in the crotch and sent flying by a bull).

Eventually, Madie finds the money Callahan was given and she wonders how he got it. He then reluctantly explains how, trying to explain that he took it unwillingly. She doesn't believe him and ends up getting in the truck and driving off without him.

Callahan winds up hitching a ride on the back of a motorcycle with an older man. When they finally find the truck, he is forced to get off the bike and jump onto the back of the truck while both are still moving, thus putting him in Madie's shoes at the beginning.

Madie drives the truck all the way back home to Benjamin, who is having a party in the backyard. Despite his pleas for her to stop the truck and that "everything will be just fine", she proceeds to wreak havoc on the party by running over everything in her way, and finally put the coup de grace on it by driving the truck through the house until it won't go any further.

After Madie gets out of the truck, Benjamin tries to choke her to death, but Callahan jumps out of the trailer and tackles him to the canvas. Then, she fingers him as the driver of the truck, and she and Callahan get away, but not before running one more time into Jules, at which point he simply concedes the truck to him.

== Cast ==
- Dyan Cannon as Madie Levrington
- Robert Blake as Charles Callahan
- Quinn Redeker as Benjamin Levrington
- Michael Lerner as Dr. Frederick Froll
- Maxine Stuart as Sam Klinger
- William Lucking as Jules
- Rozelle Gayle as Orderly
- George P. Wilbur as Billy Ray
- Darwin Joston as Drunken Trucker
- Dick Durock as Gregory
- Cassandra Peterson as Dinner Party Guest
- Karen Montgomery as Dinner Party Guest
- Vicki Frederick as Golfer
- John Roselius as Policeman

== Reception ==
Syndicated critic Joe Baltake gave a rave review of the film, hailing it as "such proven fun, so dependable for making you laugh and feel good all over, well, why not sit through it again? [...] Both Cannon and Blake turn in amazingly credible, three-dimensional performances."

Newsday's Joseph Gelmis gave Coast to Coast three stars out of four and called it "one of the year's few films that can be enjoyed by the entire family."

An unfavorable review from Gene Siskel likened it to Smokey and the Bandit and said, "Thoughtless movies like Coast to Coast give the movies a bad name."

== Awards and nominations ==
- 1st Golden Raspberry Award

Nominated: Worst Actor (Robert Blake)
