= Rozelle Gayle =

American jazz musician

Rozelle Ivory Gayle (February 24, 1919 – December 6, 1986) was an American jazz pianist, comic entertainer and actor.

== Biography ==
Born in Chicago, he studied at the American Conservatory of Music before working as a pianist with Roy Eldridge's band, recording with them in 1943. A follower of Art Tatum, he moved to southern California in 1948, and started performing as a solo act in clubs. In 1953, he had a residency in Santa Ana, California. A review in Jet magazine described his "boogie-to-Bach repertoire" and claimed he was being hailed as "the new Fats Waller". He recorded several tracks for the Combo label in the mid-1950s, including some using the name Paul Preston.

In 1958, he recorded the album Like, Be My Guest – An Evening With Rozelle Gayle for Mercury Records. The album combined jazz with hipster comedy. He also recorded with Benny Carter in 1964. He released a second album, Sex Cracks on the Dooto label in 1967; the album was promoted as "America's maddest album yet", containing "super sidesplitting sex-humor galore!" Gayle also acted in many movies, including The Devil's Daughter (1973), Coast to Coast, The Man with Bogart's Face (both 1980), and Honkytonk Man (1982).

He died of cancer in Los Angeles in 1986, aged 67.

== Filmography ==
Year	Title	Role	Notes				
1949	The Joint is Jumpin'	Himself					
1973	The Devil's Daughter	Fedora	TV movie				
1973	Blood, Black and White						
1975	The Jeffersons	Bill Simpson	Episode: "Mr. Piano Man"				
1975	Let's Do It Again	Exhibition Boxing Match Announcer	Uncredited	1975	‘’Good Times’’	Annoying barfly	Episode: "Florida’s Rich Cousin"
1976	Starsky & Hutch	Toby	Episode: "Losing Streak"				
1976	Sanford and Son	Sgt. Perkins / Dan	2 episodes	1978	‘’Good Times’’	Frazee	Episode: "The Boarder"
1976–1978	Barnaby Jones	Rambo / Alf Wortman	2 episodes				
1980	The Man with Bogart's Face	Mastodon					
1980	Coast to Coast	Orderly					
1982	Honkytonk Man	Club Manager					

== Discography ==
- Like, Be My Guest (Mercury, 1958)
- Sex Cracks (Dooto, 1967)
