= Lollypop Jones =

American vaudeville entertainer (1897–1954)

Onnie "Lollypop" Jones (November 8, 1897 – August 22, 1954) was an American vaudeville entertainer and comedian who performed for African-American audiences on stage and film in the 1940s.

Born in Madison, Georgia, he worked as a singer, dancer and comedian in vaudeville. In 1927, he appeared in a traveling revue, Keep Movin'. He also performed in nightclubs, including the Dew Drop Inn, in New Orleans. He made commercials for Jax Beer, and took the starring role in several low budget 1946 films including Midnight Menace (also known as The Hidden Menace), Lucky Gamblers, and Chicago After Dark. In Midnight Menace, Jones plays a version of himself in a 24-minute all-black musical comedy film. These and many similar films were made on a low budget by the All-American News company in Chicago, and were shown almost exclusively in African-American movie theaters.

Jones died in 1954, following a lengthy illness.

== Filmography ==
- Lucky Gamblers (1946)
- Midnight Menace (1946)
