= Muggy-Doo =

Muggy-Doo is a talking animal character created by Hal Seeger. Originally appearing in comic books, this character soon went on to animated cartoons as part of the 1965 Milton the Monster Show, but did not last long in either venue.

== History ==
=== Comic books ===
Muggy-Doo started out as the feline star of a 1953 comic from Stanhall Publishing entitled Muggy-Doo, Boy Cat. He was a screwball character who bought and sold junk for a living and who always wore a loose-fitting yellow T-shirt, the front of which had writing that kept changing to fit his situation (in the style of the Yellow Kid). The comic also included stories starring other characters, such as Elmer the Elk, Orry the Orangutan, and the porcine Stuffy Derma. Also featured was a fez-wearing hound named Osh, who acted as a foil for Muggy, but also appeared in solo stories.

The title lasted only four issues, but at least two of them were reprinted in 1963 by I. W. Publications, under their “Super Comics” label.

=== Animation ===
In 1963, Muggy-Doo appeared in the theatrically released animated cartoon Boy Pest with Osh, in which Muggy tried to make money by getting Osh onto a television show.

In 1965, the character was changed considerably — he was now a “boy fox” instead of a cat, and more con artist than screwball — and appeared in six cartoons as part of The Milton the Monster Show (which was another Hal Seeger creation).

The cartoons air in the United States on the MeTV Toons channel during Casper & Company among other Seeger produced cartoons.

No.	Title	Original release date
1	"You Auto Be in Pictures"	15 January 1965
Publicity agent Muggy drives recklessly to get to a movie studio for a job.
2	"Crumb Bumming"	18 January 1965
Muggy is a nuisance to Osh, who has just opened a bake shop.
3	"Gogh Van Gogh"	12 March 1965
Muggy tries to create a modern art masterpiece with the aid of a monkey.
4	"Muggy Doo or Die"	21 May 1965
Vacuum salesman Muggy gets involved in international espionage.
5	"Fortune Kooky"	21 January 1966
Muggy is entrusted with a ceremonial Chinese robe, which two men are trying to steal.
6	"From Riches to Rags"	21 January 1966
Bellhop Muggy sells pieces of a famous guest’s wardrobe to the other hotel guests as souvenirs.
