= Len Maxwell =

American actor

- Born: Lenny Maxwell; August 8, 1930; New York City, New York, US
- Died: May 13, 2008 (aged 77); Los Angeles, California, US
- Occupations: Comedian, Voice Actor, Announcer
- Known for: Batfink (1966–1967)

Len Maxwell (August 8, 1930 – May 13, 2008), born Lenny Maxwell, was an American voice actor and announcer.

== Career ==
Prior to his career in voice-overs, Len was a stand-up comedian.

Maxwell appeared on The Tonight Show several times, a CBS special called, The Nut House and an NBC special called The Future Lies Ahead while also appearing in night clubs and theaters in Las Vegas, New York City, Chicago and Los Angeles with entertainers including Frank Sinatra, Peggy Lee, Lena Horne, Ella Fitzgerald to name but a few. During this time, he dabbled in management, helping to launch Neil Sedaka's solo career.

At an engagement at New York's Copacabana, a producer for an advertising agency approached Maxwell and asked him if he would be willing to do some of the voices in his act on a series of commercials. Maxwell agreed. Two weeks later, when he received a check for the few hours of what was an easy and enjoyable experience, Maxwell was shocked at the large amount of the check. He called the advertising agency, saying there had to be some mistake. They said they would look into it. Two days later, a representative of the agency called back and apologized for the error and said they would send Len the rest. It was at that moment that Len decided to make voice-overs his career.

During Maxwell's career in voice-overs, he recorded over 25,000 commercials, including the voice for "Punchy" the iconic Hawaiian Punch mascot - plus dozens of animated cartoons, and voice-overs in motion pictures.

Maxwell won the advertising industry's coveted CLIO award for best voice-over actor/announcer. He co-wrote and co-produced the short animated film The Crunch Bird in which he did all five voices. The film won the Academy Award for best animated short. He also directed the sound track for the film. He also provided several voices for the 1970 Christmas animated special, The Night the Animals Talked.

Maxwell supplied the voices of Karate and The Chief in the children's cartoon series Batfink, and the judge in the animated feature Hugo the Hippo.

Maxwell wrote some comedy with Woody Allen. He appeared with Allen on screen in Allen ’s What's Up Tiger Lily, and did the voices of most of the main characters in that film. Voice-overs in Allen’s Take the Money and Run and Sleeper followed. He and Allen remained friends until his death.

Maxwell was also the voice of the color analyst Nick Diamond in the MTV animated series Celebrity Deathmatch from 1998-2002. He was credited in most episodes as Barry Manos.

In 1964, Maxwell released the Christmas/Monster-themed LP, "A Merry Monster Christmas". This album entertained families for decades with its head-on collision of classic movie monsters with traditional Christmas observances. The album became difficult to find until Maxwell updated and re-released it on CD in 2005.

Maxwell was the voice of The Story Teller on the Verve comedy LP "The New First Family 1968," using a voice very similar to the one he used for the series of Kix cereal commercials featuring various monsters (Gzork, Zilch, Cologne, etc).

== Death ==
Len Maxwell died on May 13, 2008, in Los Angeles, California. His birthplace was New York City. He had been in bad health for a long time and had been hospitalized since December 2007.
