= Killer Diller (1948 film) =

- Directed by: Josh Binney
- Written by: Hal Seeger
- Produced by: E. M. Glucksman
- Starring: Dusty Fletcher; George Wiltshire; Butterfly McQueen; Andy Kirk; Four Congaroos
- Cinematography: Lester Lang
- Edited by: Louis Hesse
- Music by: Count Basie; Milton Ebbens; Johnny Miller
- Distributed by: All American
- Release date: 1948
- Running time: 73 minutes
- Country: United States
- Language: English

Killer Diller is a 1948 American musical comedy race film directed by Josh Binney and released by All American. Academic and comedienne Eddie Tafoya wrote that "Killer Diller is really more concerned with showcasing black talent appearing at Harlem's legendary Apollo Theater than it is with providing audiences with a satisfying story." The movie features The Clark Brothers (tap dancers), Nat King Cole, Moms Mabley, Dusty Fletcher, Butterfly McQueen, the Andy Kirk Orchestra and the Four Congaroos (dancing the Lindy Hop). René J. Hall was the film's arranger.

== Plot ==
Dusty Fletcher plays a comic, tap dancer and bad magician. While practicing his routine for that evening's variety show, he accidentally vanishes Lola, the girlfriend of the show's manager, Baltimore Dumdone. She was wearing a thousand-dollar string of pearls and it seems most likely that crime is afoot. Dusty's slapstick antics take up a large portion of the film's first act, with some Keystone Cops-type schtick thrown in when four police officers begin chasing Dusty in and out of his disappearance cabinet.

== Cast ==
- Dusty Fletcher as Dusty
- George Wiltshire as Dumdone, the manager
- Butterfly McQueen as Butterfly, his secretary
- Nellie Hill as Lola, his fiancée
- Freddie Robinson as Sarge
- William Campbell as Policeman
- Edgar Martin as Policeman
- Sidney Easton as Policeman
- Augustus Smith as Stage Hand
- Moms Mabley as Vaudeville Star (as Jackie Mabley)
- Ken Renard as Voodoo Man, a magician

As themselves: Clark Bros., Nat King Cole and The King Cole Trio, Four Congaroos, Johnny Miller, Irving Ashby and Patterson & Jackson.

== Music ==
The variety show features Ray Abrams and Gator Green playing the two-tenor sax number "Gator Serenade," written by Green, supported by the rest of the Andy Kirk and His Orchestra. Beverly White sings the racy jazz tune "I Don't Want to Get Married." Her second song, "Ain't Nobody's Business What I Do," is likewise racy, about the joy of carousing and cheating: "If I feel like going out and having some fun/ With some young cat who looks like he might be my son/ That ain't nobody's business what I do." The act of Warren Patterson and Al Jackson sing Jule Styne and Sammy Kahn's "I Believe," Warren leading off and Al doing his part as a Louis Armstrong impersonation. Then Al sings the Fats Waller classic "Ain't Misbehavin'" as Warren tapdances. He is still dancing when Al adds "Wonderful One" to his medley. Lastly, they impersonate the Ink Spots, though there are only two of them to recreate "If I Didn't Care," Warren duplicating the tenor lead until he intentionally becomes comical, while Al does the spoken bridge with new silly words.

Jackie "Moms" Mabley sings the comic song "Don't Sit on My Bed."

The King Cole Trio is up next. Nat at the piano sings "Oo, Kickerooni." The trio follows up with the Don Wolf and Alan Brandt composition "Now He Tells Me," another humorous bit of cool jazz, before closing with "Breezy and the Bass" written by Nat and Johnny "Breezy" Miller.

The Four Congaroos do the Lindy Hop while Andy Kirk's orchestra plays "Basie's Boogie." Kirk's Orchestra performs two more songs, featuring guitar, bass guitar, and saxophone solos. The "Varietettes Dancing Girls" (from Katherine Durham's School of Dancing) close the show with "Apollo Groove," with Andy Kirk and His Orchestra backing them.

=== Soundtrack ===
- The King Cole Trio featuring Johnny Miller - "Breezy and the Bass" (music by Nat King Cole and Johnny Miller)
- Andy Kirk and His Orchestra - "Basie Boogie" (music by Count Basie and Milton Ebbens)
- Andy Kirk and His Orchestra - "Gator Serenade"
- Andy Kirk and His Orchestra - "Apollo Groove"
- The King Cole Trio - "Ooh, Kickeroonie" (music and lyrics by Nat King Cole)
- The King Cole Trio - "Now He Tells Me" (music and lyrics by Don Wolf and Alan Brandt)
- Patterson & Jackson - "If I Didn't Care" (music and lyrics by Jack Lawrence)
- Patterson & Jackson - "I Believe" (music by Jule Styne, lyrics by Sammy Cahn)
- Jackson, with dancing by Warren Patterson - "Ain't Misbehavin'" (music by Fats Waller and Harry Brooks, lyrics by Andy Razaf)
- Beverly White - "It Ain't Nobody's Business What I Do" (music and lyrics by S.G. Stampsel, Morris Markowitz and J.A. Browne)
- Beverly White - "I Don't Want to Get Married"
- Jackie Mabley - "Don't Sit on My Bed!"

== Production ==
It was shot at the RKO Pathé studio.

The acts were performed and filmed before a live, segregated audience, with African Americans seated in the balcony.

== Reception ==
Film Threat reviewer Phil Hall wrote:

It suffers from all of the vices that were prevalent in the race films: painfully low budgets, inadequate direction, uneven performances and wobbly writing. But that is just for the narrative section of the movie. The rest of "Killer Diller" is blessed with an extraordinary cast of talented performers who went far above and beyond the limitations of their material.

Author and journalist Mel Watkins noted "that Moms Mabley was so obviously disengaged in Killer Diller, since her usual routines were much too indelicate to be filmed."

== Home media ==
It is available on DVD and as a free download from the Internet Archive.
