= Hadda Brooks =

American pianist, vocalist and composer (1916–2002)

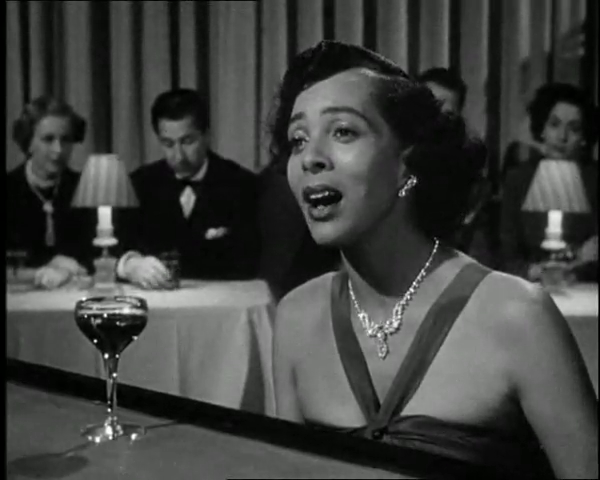
- Brooks as the singer of "I Hadn't Anyone Till You" in the film In a Lonely Place (1950)

Background information
- Born: Hattie L. Hapgood; October 29, 1916; Los Angeles, California, U.S.
- Died: November 21, 2002 (aged 86) Los Angeles, California, U.S.
- Genres: Blues, boogie woogie, jazz, R&B
- Occupations: Musician, composer
- Instruments: Piano, vocals
- Years active: 1940s–2000s
- Labels: Modern, Crown, Virgin, Pointblank, Oldie Blues

Hadda Brooks (born Hattie L. Hapgood October 29, 1916 – November 21, 2002) was an American pianist, vocalist and composer, who occasionally appeared playing the piano in film. Billed as "Queen of the Boogie", she was inducted in the Rhythm and Blues Foundation Hall of Fame in 1993.

== Career ==
Brooks became a singer during the mid-1940s. Jules Bihari of Modern Records gave her the recording name "Hadda Brooks".

In the 1970s, she commuted to Europe for performances in nightclubs and festivals. She performed rarely in the United States, and moved to Australia. Queen of the Boogie, a compilation of recordings from the 1940s, was released in 1984. Two years later her manager Alan Eichler brought her out of a 16-year retirement before she went on tour. She sang at Hawaii's statehood ceremony in 1959, and was once invited to a private audience with Pope Pius XII.

She resumed her recording career with the 1994 album Anytime, Anyplace, Anywhere for DRG. Virgin Records acquired the old Modern catalogue and, thanks to Brooks' new-found success, issued a compilation of her 1940s and 1950s recordings entitled That's My Desire. The label signed her to record three songs for the Christmas album Even Santa Gets the Blues, made more unusual by the fact she had releases on the same label 50 years apart. Time Was When (Virgin, 1996) included Al Viola (guitar), Eugene Wright (bass) and Richard Dodd (cello), and she wrote two of its songs: "You Go Your Way and I'll Go Crazy" and "Mama's Blues". Concerts were held at Michael's Pub in New York City, and the Vine St. Bar and Grill.

In 2007, a 72-minute documentary on Brooks's life, Queen of the Boogie, directed by Austin Young and Barry Pett, was presented at the Los Angeles Silver Lake Film Festival.

== Personal ==
In 1940, Brooks married Earl "Shug" Morrison, of the Harlem Globetrotters, but was widowed within a year and never re-married.

Brooks died at the age of 86 at White Memorial Medical Center in Los Angeles after open-heart surgery.

== Discography ==
Year	Title	Genre	Label
1957	Femme Fatale	Jazz, blues	Crown
1958	Swings the Boogie	Jazz, blues	Crown
1963	Sings and Swings	Jazz, blues	Crown
1971	Hadda	Jazz, blues	Rob Ray
1984	Queen of the Boogie	Jazz, blues	Oldie Blues
1988	Romance in the Dark	Jazz, blues	Jukebox Lil
1993	Romance in the Dark (The Modern Recordings)	Jazz, blues	Ace
1994	Anytime, Anyplace, Anywhere	Jazz, blues	DRG
1994	That's My Desire (The Modern Recordings)	Jazz, blues	Virgin/Flair
1995	Even Santa Gets the Blues	Jazz, blues	Pointblank/Virgin
1996	Time Was When	Jazz, blues	Pointblank/Virgin
1997	Jump Back Honey: The Complete OKeh Sessions	Jazz, blues	Columbia/Legacy
1999	I've Got News for You [2-CD]	Jazz, blues	Pointblank/Virgin
2003	Swingin' the Boogie	Jazz, blues	Ace
2005	That's Where I Came In	Jazz, blues	Ace

== Filmography ==
Year	Title	Role	Notes
1947	Out of the Blue	Herself	
1948	Boogie Woogie Blues	Herself	
1949	The Joint is Jumpin'	Herself	
1950	In a Lonely Place	Herself	
1952	The Bad and the Beautiful	Piano Player	Uncredited
1995	The Crossing Guard	Piano Player	
1999	The Thirteenth Floor	Lounge Piano Player	
2000	John John in the Sky	Mrs. Kendricks	(final film role)
