= The Night the Animals Talked =

- Written by: Jan Hartman; Sam Rosen
- Story by: Peter Fernandez
- Directed by: Shamus Culhane
- Starring: Joe Silver--Ox; Pat Bright--Cow; Bob Kaliban--Goat; Frank Porella--Donkey; Ruth Franklin--Various Animals; Ardyth Kayser--Various Animals; Len Maxwell--Various Animals
- Music by: Jack Cortner
- Countries of origin: United States; Italy
- Original language: English

Production
- Producers: David Gerber; Sheldon Riss; Pablo Zavala; Roberto Gavioli; Gino Gavioli
- Running time: 25 minutes

Original release
- Network: ABC
- Release: December 9, 1970

The Night the Animals Talked is an animated children's Christmas television special, first shown on ABC television on December 9, 1970. It was repeated four times on ABC, in 1971, 1972, 1973 and 1977. The American/Italian co-production was based on a legend that all of the animals could talk at midnight, on the night that Jesus was born.

== Plot ==
The special focuses on an old Norwegian holiday legend regarding the Nativity of Jesus. The plot focuses on a simple stable, which suddenly is showered with light from the Star of Bethlehem. The animals stir in their sleep. When they awaken, they realize that they can communicate with each other. At first, the animals use the ability to disparage each other and to establish superiority over each other, especially over the two hogs who are not allowed into the stable. An ox, the apparent leader of the animals, is angered by such behavior, as it reveals that they are acting like humans. The animals realize the error of their ways, and attempt to make amends when word reaches them (through the donkey carrying Mary) that an expectant couple desperately needs shelter.

At first, the animals refuse to allow the humans into the manger, as they look down on them and their behavior. But, the animals relent, and Mary and Joseph are allowed into the stable for the night. That night, as Jesus is born, the animals are overwhelmed with love for each other—even the hogs are allowed into the stable for the first time to see the baby. Then, the animals come to the realization that they have been given the gift of speech to tell the world of the "miracle"—the birth of Christ. However, as they run through Bethlehem, each animal loses his gift. They return to the stable in silence—but with newfound respect and love for each other. The ox, the last one to lose his speech, is left to wonder if humanity will ever understand the miracle it has been given.

== Production ==
The Night the Animals Talked was produced by Gino Gavioli and Roberto Gavioli's Gamma Film of Milan, Italy, and was directed by animation veteran Shamus Culhane. The story evolved from an MGM Records children's recording written by writer and voiceover artist Peter Fernandez. Although the copyright status of this film is uncertain, bootleg copies are common.

== Themes ==
The special is known for approaching a variety of themes, such as segregation, racism, and vanity. The interactions of the animals spells out the problems of mankind, but they are seen through the vantage points of animals, in a manner similar to George Orwell's Animal Farm.

== Music ==
The program featured songs from the well-known duo of lyricist Sammy Cahn and composer Jule Styne; their contributions to the special, "A Parable", "It's Great to Communicate", "The Greatest Miracle of All", "Let's Not Behave Like People" and "A Place Like This", remain mostly unknown to their fans.

== Legacy ==
The cartoon has seen a revival mostly through the manufacture and circulation of bootleg copies of the program. The Night the Animals Talked was never officially released in any form on VHS or DVD. McGraw-Hill released a 16mm film print for educational use in schools in 1975.

== See also ==
- List of Christmas films
