= Congaroos =

American dance group

The Congaroos (also known as Four Congaroos, Congaroo Dancers) was a dance group created in 1947 by Frankie Manning after completing his military service for World War II. The group originally consisted of Frankie Manning dancing with Ann Johnson and Russell Williams dancing with Willamae Ricker. Later Helen Daniels joined the group and partnered Frankie Manning. The group performed Lindy Hop, Conga, jazz dance, tap dance, Latin dances, and comedy with musicians and vocalists such as Alvino Rey, Lucky Millinder, Illinois Jacquet, Ella Fitzgerald, Count Basie, Erskine Hawkins, Andy Kirk, Fletcher Henderson, and Cab Calloway.

The group disbanded in 1955. For their final performance at a benefit in Philadelphia, Lionel Hampton refused to play the music for their act. Consequently, the Congaroos did not get a chance to rehearse and were forced to improvise their entire act to music that Lionel Hampton chose.

== Filmography ==
- Killer Diller (1948) * Killer Diller 1948
- See, download Killer Diller at Internet Archive Congaroos begin @ ~ 51:20
