= Sybil Lewis (actress) =

American actress

Sybil Lewis was an actress in the United States. An African American, she appeared in several films including musicals during the 1940s. She appeared in African American films (race films) and Hollywood pictures. She had starring roles in several African American films including Lucky Gamblers and Am I Guilty? and portrayed smaller roles including as a maid in Hollywood films. She also had a leading role in Broken Strings (film) in 1940.

She starred with Pigmeat Markham and John Bunn, Jr. in vaudeville shows at the Apollo Theater in Harlem, New York.

Born Sybil N. Sanford in San Francisco, California, USA

Died September 28, 1988 (age 68) San Mateo County, California, USA

== Filmography ==
- Am I Guilty? (1940)
- Mystery in Swing (1940), as Cleo Ellis
- Broken Strings (film) (1940) as Grace
- Revenge of the Zombies (1943) as Rosella
- Going My Way (1944), maid at Metropolitan Opera House
- The Very Thought of You (1944)
- Lucky Gamblers (1946)
- Midnight Menace (1946)
- Boy! What a Girl! (1947), as Mme. Deborah Martin
- Miracle in Harlem (1948) as Alice Adams
