= Midnight Menace (1946 film) =

Film

- Directed by: Josh Binney
- Produced by: All-American News; Al Sack
- Music by: Fats Waller; Andy Razaf
- Release date: 1946

Midnight Menace is a 1946 American short musical film directed by Josh Binney. It was produced by All-American News and Al Sack. The plot involves a Voodoo practitioner making dead bodies appear around Lollypop Jones. The film features songs by Fats Waller and Andy Razaf. An alternative description of the plot says the film is about a Voodoo practitioner hypnotizing a man's wife and using her in his stage show.

The film was advertised as having an "All Colored Cast". Jones also starred in Chicago After Dark and Lucky Gamblers.

== Cast ==
- Sybil Lewis
- Lollypop Jones
- George Wiltshire
- James Dunsmore
- Harold Coke
- Leon Poke
- Amos Austin
- Alma Jones
- Jimmy Walker
- Black Diamond Dollies

== Songs ==
- "Don't Sell My Monkey Baby"
- "Honeysuckle Rose"
