= Revenge of the Zombies =

1943 film by Steve Sekely

- Directed by: Steve Sekely
- Written by: Edmond Kelso; Van Norcross
- Produced by: Lindsley Parsons
- Starring: John Carradine; Gale Storm; Robert Lowery; Mantan Moreland; Bob Steele
- Cinematography: Mack Stengler
- Edited by: Richard C. Currier
- Music by: Edward J. Kay
- Production company: Monogram Pictures
- Distributed by: Monogram Pictures
- Release date: September 17, 1943
- Running time: 61 minutes
- Country: United States
- Language: English

Revenge of the Zombies is a 1943 American horror film directed by Steve Sekely and starring John Carradine, Gale Storm, Robert Lowery, Mantan Moreland, Bob Steele, and Veda Ann Borg. The film focuses on Dr. Max Heinrich von Altermann, a mad scientist working to create a race of living dead warriors for the Third Reich. It was a follow-up to King of the Zombies (1941), with Moreland reprising his role as Jeff and Madame Sul-Te-Wan returning as a different character. It is both a sequel and a partial remake of the original film.

== Plot ==
In the Louisiana bayou, Scott Warrington returns to his familial home after his sister, Lila, is seemingly poisoned to death. He is accompanied by private detective Larry Adams and Larry's servant, Jeff. Scott meets with Lila's widow, Dr. Max Heinrich von Altermann, a scientist who in fact murdered Lila before reviving her. It is revealed that Max has successfully been experimenting with creating zombies.

While visiting the home, Larry and Jeff witness Lila walk through a doorway in the house. Max dismisses their claim and shows them Lila's body in her casket as proof. Later, Max covertly meets with a German agent, whom Max plans on supplying with a horde of indomitable zombies to help the Third Reich win World War II. Despite his previous successes, Max is alarmed when he finds that Lila appears to possess free will, and subsequently goes missing. The family's doctor, Harvey Keating, also goes missing while searching for her.

Jeff recurrently encounters the corpse of a man, which inexplicably disappears. When Scott insists that Max call the police, Max summons the German agent, who impersonates the sheriff. After realizing Scott, Larry, and Jeff are uncovering his deceit, Max locks Larry in a closet and proceeds to poison a dinner meal he has for his guests.

After being freed by Jeff, Larry encounters Lila, who tells him that Max's horde of zombies will be freed only upon his death. Later, Larry and Scott fall unconscious after consuming Max's poisoned meal. Max brings Scott to his laboratory to turn him into a zombie. Meanwhile, it is revealed that Larry feigned his unconsciousness, and he learns from the German agent that he is in fact an undercover federal agent of the United States.

Before Max can begin his procedure to transform Scott into a zombie, he is attacked by Jeff, along with the house servant Beulah and her granddaughter Rosella, who have banded together. They are followed by Lila, leading a troop of Max's zombies who converge upon him. Max flees into the swamp, where Lila forces him into a pool of sinking mud, taking herself as well.

With Max dead, the zombies return to their graves, and Keating revives Scott. Scott remains at this familial estate, while Larry and Max's secretary, Jennifer, leave together, while Rosella and Jeff depart for New York.

== Cast ==
- John Carradine as Dr. Max Heinrich von Altermann
- Gale Storm as Jennifer Rand
- Robert Lowery as Larry Adams
- Bob Steele as United States agent posing as Sheriff
- Mantan Moreland as Jeff Jackson
- Veda Ann Borg as Lila von Altermann
- Barry Macollum as Dr. Harvey Keating
- Mauritz Hugo as Scott Warrington
- Madame Sul-Te-Wan as Mammy Beulah, the housekeeper
- James Baskett as Lazarus
- Sybil Lewis as Rosella
- Robert Cherry as Pete, a zombie
- Franklyn Farnum as zombie

== Production ==
The film was a semi-remake of King of the Zombies. It was co-written by Edmond Kelso, who wrote the first film, and has a similar storyline: two men and a servant played by Mantan Moreland are guests in a strange house where a mad scientist with a zombie wife is working for Nazi Germany.

It was meant to star Bela Lugosi, but Lugosi ended up not appearing. The movie was the first in a new six-film contract between Monogram and Moreland.

The film was announced in April 1943 with Robert Lowery and Mantan Moreland attached.

Filming was meant to start on 10 May 1943. However, this date was pushed back, and John Carradine became the star.

== Release ==
Revenge of the Zombies was theatrically released in the United States on September 17, 1943.

=== Home media ===
Kino Lorber released the film on Blu-ray on November 26, 2024, under license from Metro-Goldwyn-Mayer. The disc features an audio commentary with scholars Tom Weaver and Gary D. Rhodes, providing background on the movie and its producers' negotiations with the Office of War Information and the Bureau of Motion Pictures, which disapproved of several elements of its script.

== Reception ==
Writing in The Zombie Movie Encyclopedia, Peter Dendle wrote that it is the first zombie film to presume that audiences know what a zombie is. Dendle called it a remake of King of the Zombies and "stock fare from the Monogram horror mill".

== Sources ==
- Dendle, Peter (2000). The Zombie Movie Encyclopedia. McFarland & Company. ISBN 978-0-786-46367-1.
- Weaver, Tom (1999). Poverty Row Horrors!: Monogram, PRC and Republic Horror Films of the Forties. Jefferson, North Carolina: McFarland & Company. ISBN 978-1-476-61162-4.
