= Josh Binney =

Actor, film producer, film company executive, and film director (1889–1956)

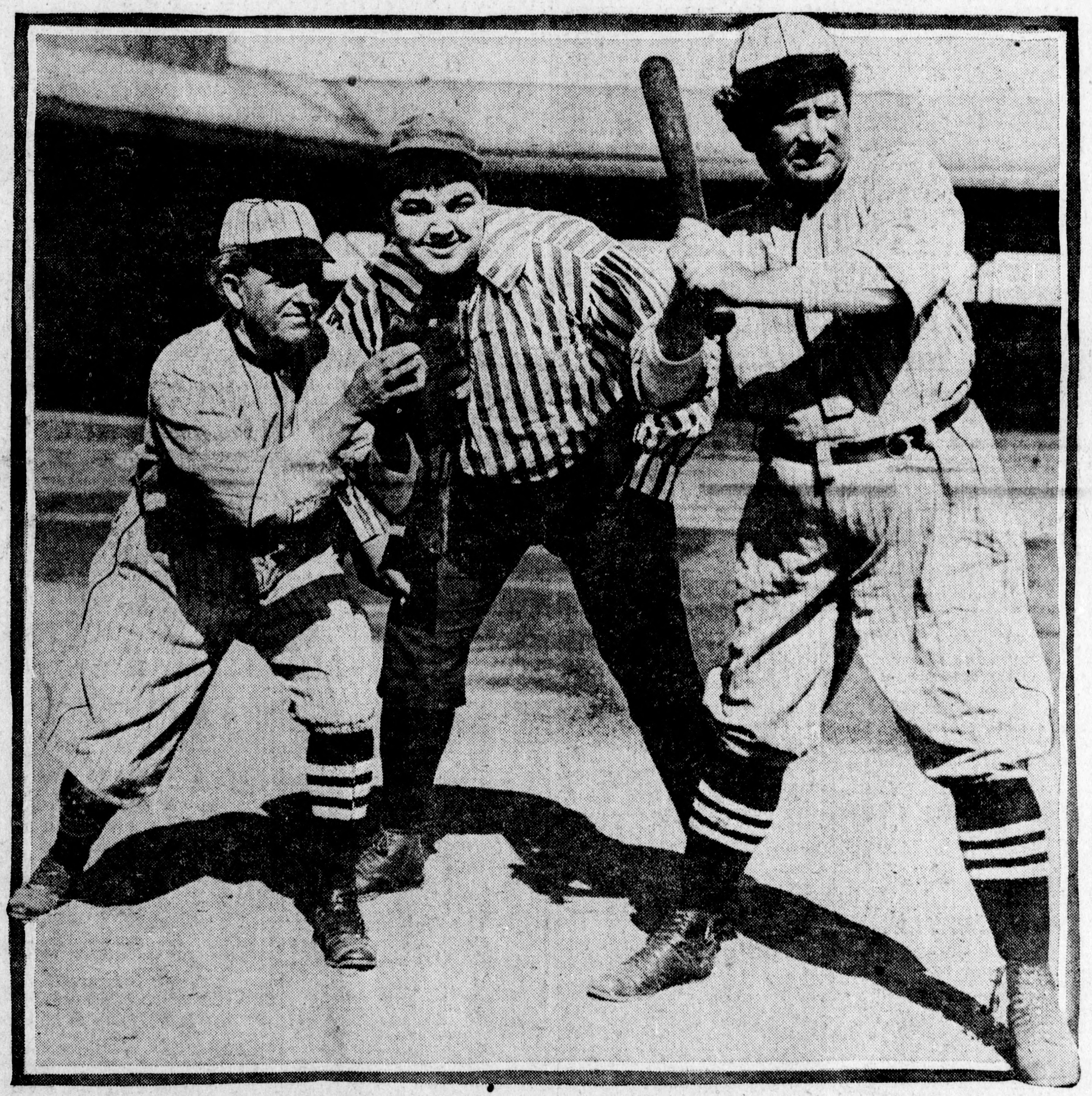
Binney (center) plays baseball with Los Angeles City Councilmen W. A. Roberts (left) and Fred C. Wheeler, 1915

Harold "Josh" Binney (1889 – 1956) was an actor, film producer, film company executive, and film director in the United States. He worked as an actor before establishing the Florida Film Company in Jacksonville, Florida in 1918 and produced and producing their films through his Harold J. Binney Productions division. He moved on to Canada and then Sonoma, California.

== Early life ==
Harold Joshua Binney was born in Kansas City. He studied at the University of Washington and was an actor in vaudeville productions and with stock companies before becoming a film actor. He acted in films for Biograph, IMP, and Vogue.

== Career in film production ==
He established Florida Film Corporation in Jacksonville and in 1918 producing and directed five comedies for the studio featuring Hillard “Fat” Karr who began his career in comedy films at Josh Binney Comedies in Florida. The films are Fabulous Fortune Fumblers, Fred's Fictitious Foundling, Freda's Fighting Father, Fatty's Fast Flivver, and Fatty's Frivolous Fiance. Hilliard, Frank Alexander, and Bill "Kewpie" Ross went on to form a team of heavyweight comedians in "Ton of Fun" comedies. Florence McLaughlin was another one of the actors in his Florida film crew. He also worked with Vangie Valentine in 1918 on her film debut in Velvet and Rags.

Binney then moved to Canada and established Canadian Photoplay Productions but it fell through.

In 1922 he was involved in a film project in Oregon. He solicited photographs from community members interested in participating and Oregon governor Ben Olcott and Salem mayor George E. Halvorsen were said to be taking part.

In late 1923 Binney set up operations just outside of Sonoma, California. Leasing a former resort, he started production on a proposed series of twelve short comedies. Later that year he was caught passing a bad check with local merchants. His backers paid his debts, but he was soon under investigation in Montana for bilking investors there. In Butte, in 1924, he was tried and convicted of fraud and sentenced to three to six years in prison. He was paroled in November 1925.

=== Films of African American performers ===
Hi-De-Ho (1947) starring Cab Calloway directed by Josh Binney

In the 1940s Binney directed several musical "race films" with African American casts for All-American News film company. The films included Hi-De-Ho (1947) starring Cab Calloway, Boarding House Blues with Moms Mabley and Dusty Fletcher as well as Killer Diller (1948) starring Fletcher and Butterfly McQueen. He directed a British comedy feature film called Merry-Go-Round starring Bonar Colleano in 1948.

== Filmography ==
=== Actor ===
- A Hash House Fraud (1915), extant
- Merely a Married Man (1915)
- Court House Crooks (1915), extant
- Only a Messenger Boy (1915)
- The Best of Enemies (1915 film) (1915)
- A Janitor's Wife's Temptation (1915)
- A Submarine Pirate (1915)
- The Candy Cook (1916)
- The Snow Cure (1916)

=== Producer and director ===
- Fred's Fictitious Foundling (1918)
- Fabulous Fortune Fumblers
- Freda's Fighting Father
- Fatty's Fast Flivver
- Fatty's Frivolous Fiance

=== Director ===
- Midnight Menace (1946)
- Chicago After Dark (1946)
- Hi-De-Ho (1947 film)
- Boarding House Blues (1948)
- Killer Diller (1948 film)
- The Joint is Jumpin' (1948)
