= Batfink =

1966–1967 animated television series

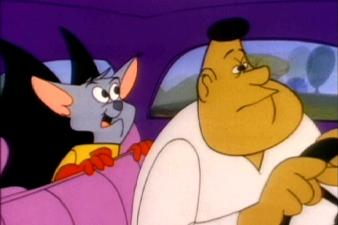
- Batfink being chauffeured by his sidekick Karate.
- Created by: Hal Seeger
- Written by: Dennis Marks; Heywood Kling
- Starring: Frank Buxton; Len Maxwell
- Narrated by: Len Maxwell
- Country of origin: United States
- No. of episodes: 100

Production
- Running time: 26 min. (approx. 6 min. per short)
- Production companies: Hal Seeger Productions; Golden West Broadcasters

Original release
- Network: KTLA and syndication
- Release: April 21, 1966 – October 4, 1967

Batfink is an American animated television series, consisting of five-minute shorts, that first aired in April 1966. (Note: David Mackay published a filmography of Batfink in the Sept. 1993 issues of Frames per Second magazine, and also provided a complete listing of episodes, plot summaries and air dates on his website) The 100-episode series was quickly created by Hal Seeger, starting in 1966, to send up the popular Batman and Green Hornet television series, which had premiered the same year.

It depicts an anthropomorphic bat cyborg who acts as superhero and a martial artist who is acting as his sidekick. The main villain is Hugo A Go Go, a mad scientist who seeks world domination.

== Plot ==
Batfink is a bat superhero with metal wings. With the help of his sidekick, Karate, he fights crime in his city, usually against his recurring villain, Hugo A-Go-Go.

Many episodes place Batfink in a dangerous cliffhanger-type situation. Typically, this is effected by trapping him in some sort of bondage, placing him in a position that renders his wings useless. At the moment the potentially fatal shot is fired, the action freezes, and the narrator asks dramatically if Batfink will survive. The action then continues, with Batfink escaping via a convenient but previously unseen deus ex machina or through the use of his superpowers.

== Characters ==
=== Batfink ===
Batfink (voiced by Frank Buxton) is a superpowered anthropomorphic grey cyborg bat in a yellow costume with a big red "B" on the chest and red gauntlets and boots. He uses his supersonic sonar radar and black metallic wings to fight crime. When not fighting crime, Batfink lives in a split-level cave, though he also has a direct video link to the Chief's office in case his help is needed.

Batfink's "supersonic sonar radar" is a super-powered version of a bat's echolocation, used to locate prey. Batfink's power takes the form of the letters of the word "BEEP" either once or twice emanating from his mouth. The radar is anthropomorphic and sentient and can fly wherever Batfink needs them to go – accompanied by a distinctive beeping noise. His catchphrase during that time is "My supersonic sonar radar will help me!" Whenever Batfink said those words, he would say it through the open sun roof of the Battilac car, while it was not in motion. The radar can see, feel fear, evade capture and report back to Batfink on what it has seen. In one episode, the radar is ambushed and beaten up. The radar also gets confused, misdirected, and lost, leaving Batfink to rely on other means to spy upon the episode's villain. Once, when the radar is sent to investigate Queenie Bee and her swarm of villainous bees, it returns with the "EEP" swollen with bee stings. When Karate asks Batfink "How come they just stung the E-E-P?", he replies "Because a bee would never harm another bee. But a bee will tell on another bee.". The literal spelled-out appearance of an onomatopœia was a running gag not limited to the supersonic sonar radar; in one episode, Hugo A-Go-Go invented a tickling stick that tickles its adversaries into submission, which sent out the words "Kitchy Koo" to do the deed on Batfink (the episode ended with Batfink slicing the K's off to create the far more irritating, but less distracting, "Itchy Oo").

Batfink's main defense are his metallic wings, which he is able to fold around himself as a protective shield against most attacks, thereby spawning the most famous catchphrase of the show: "Your bullets cannot harm me – my wings are like a shield of steel!" He claims in some episodes that his wings are stainless steel, but in other episodes he explicitly states that they are not – since he always carries a can of spot remover to keep them polished. Batfink can also use his wings as offensive weapons. In one episode, he uses one of them as a sword during a duel. His wings can also help him fly at incredible speeds. They are often used to help him escape certain death or cut through bonds when he has been captured (he can break out of regular ropes, but not rubber ones). In the episode "Ebenezer the Freezer", Batfink has automatic retrorockets built into his wings, but not in any other episode. Sometimes, his wings hinder him. When in water, he will sink because of the weight of his metal wings. Powerful magnets are also a problem for him. Plutonium, for reasons unexplained (but possibly relating to his birth in a plutonium mine), also renders the wings useless. Batfink's life and wings are explained in the final episode, "Batfink: This Is Your Life", which depicts his boyhood and how his real wings were replaced.

Batfink rides in a customized pink car resembling a Volkswagen Beetle with scalloped rear fins and bat-winged red "B" emblems on the doors and hood. Called the "Battillac" (rhymes with "Cadillac"), the car is outfitted with a sun roof and many defensive devices, and is resistant to collision damage and energy weapons. Batfink often says something like "It's a good thing the Battillac is equipped with a thermonuclear plutonium-insulated blast shield!" and Karate replies, "It's also good it was a small bomb". As soon as a crime is acknowledged, Batfink says "Karate, the Battillac!"

In the last episode of the series, titled "Batfink: This Is Your Life", it is revealed that Batfink was born in an abandoned plutonium mine, which is where he obtained his powers, and that he lost his natural wings as a child while saving his mother's life after escaped convicts blew up their mountain-top cave (plutonium in real life is too scarce in the Earth's crust to be mined, it must be synthesized, usually from uranium). This incident is what motivated him to become a crime-fighter.

=== Karate ===
Kara "Karate" Te (voiced by Len Maxwell) is a gi-clad martial arts expert and Batfink's oafish sidekick who drives the Battillac. He is somewhat oversized and not very bright, but is strong enough to help Batfink out of any situation. He carries a wide variety of objects and gadgets in his "utility sleeve" (a parody of Batman's utility belt), but he often has trouble finding what he needs in it. Karate tends to succeed by dumb luck rather than by skill or ingenuity, and often Karate's involvement will make a bad situation worse. Karate is usually ordered to check downstairs while Batfink checks the upper floor. At the end of each episode, Karate will make a corny pun that is sometimes physical on the part of his stupidity. Karate's father was the blacksmith who made Batfink's metallic wings.

Karate is a direct send-up of Kato, the Green Hornet's companion. Also, like in The Green Hornet, when both characters are in the car, Karate is the driver, while Batfink rides in the back seat. In early episodes, he speaks in a stereotypical Asian accent; in later episodes, he is voiced in a clipped, nasal speech pattern, inspired by Don Adams, whose Get Smart character, Maxwell Smart, was popular at the time. On occasion, Karate even utters the Maxwell Smart-inspired catchphrase, "Sorry about that, Batfink".

=== The Chief ===
The Chief of Police (voiced by Len Maxwell) is Batfink's contact on the local police force and informs Batfink of all the latest crimes via a direct video link to Batfink's Split-Level Cave. Batfink answers "The hotline — Batfink here". The Chief also has a wife and children, who never appear onscreen, but are mentioned by Karate as having seen them in the episode "Tough MacDuff."

=== The Mayor ===
The Mayor is the unnamed mayor of the city that Batfink protects.

=== The Narrator ===
The Narrator (voiced by Len Maxwell) narrates each episode while explaining certain information and doing the cliffhanger narration.

=== Hugo A-Go-Go ===
General Professor Hugo "Jerkules" A-Go-Go (voiced by Frank Buxton) is the wild-haired smocked main villain of the series. He speaks English with a German accent. He is referred to as the world's maddest scientist and spends his time in his secret laboratory creating weird and wacky inventions (including a robot bride, complete with robot mother-in-law) to defeat Batfink and dominate the world. He always manages to escape jail to antagonize the hero in a later episode. Hugo A-Go-Go often breaks the fourth wall and has conversations with the narrator.

=== Other villains ===
Other villains that are Batfink's enemies are:

- Ebeneezer the Freezer is a villain who collaborated with Hugo A-Go-Go in a plot to freeze the city.
- Mr. Boomer is the owner of Boomer Glass Works who has been using the sonic booms caused by his jets to improve his business.
- Big Ears Ernie is a villain with sensitive hearing.
- Manhole Manny is a villain who operates in the sewers.
- Mr. M. Flick is a mad movie maker.
- Skinny Minnie is the world's thinnest thief.
  - Bony Mahoney, Diet Wyatt and Scrawny Arnie the Narrow Knaves are the henchmen of Skinny Minnie.
- Fatman is a criminal with an inflatable suit who steals fat items.
- Gluey Louie is a villain who uses glue in his capers.
- Brother Goose is a supervillain who always leaves taunting clues based on nursery rhymes.
- Myron the Magician is a criminal magician.
- Sporty Morty is a sports-themed villain that wields different sports equipment.
- The Ringading Brothers are criminal acrobats.
- Stupidman is a criminal who commits crimes that no sensible person would commit. He is also the brother-in-law of the Chief of Police.
- Professor Vibrato is a mad scientist that uses vibration technology.
- Greasy Gus is a villain who uses grease in his crimes.
- Number Zero is a villain whose real name is Plus A. Minus.
- Swami Salami is a criminal snake charmer.
- The Human Pretzel is a criminal contortionist.
- Professor Hopper is a criminal flea circus owner who uses his trained fleas to commit crimes.
- Roz the Schnozz is a criminal with a bloodhound-like nose.
- Lucky Chuck is a lucky criminal.
- Party Marty is a party-themed criminal who uses special party favors in his crimes.
- Professor Flippo is a mad scientist who invented a machine that turns things upside down.
- The Rotten Rainmaker is a villain with a weather-controlling machine.
- Gypsy James is a parking-meter thief and fortune teller who makes voodoo dolls of Batfink and Karate to try to seal their fate.
- The Chameleon is an art thief who uses portable camouflage screens.
- Beanstalk Jack is a farmer who uses instant beanstalks in his crimes.
- Curly the Human Cannonball is a criminal human cannonball.
- Robber Hood is an archery-themed criminal.
- Sandman Sam is a criminal who uses "slumber sand" that puts anyone to sleep.
- The Great Escapo is an escape artist.
- Daniel Boom is a criminal who uses explosives in his crimes.
- Queenie Bee is a female supervillain with her army of bees. Batfink sends Queenie Bee to Sing Sing and her bees to "Sting Sting".
- Sabubu is a thief from Baghdad.
- The Mean Green Midget is a short criminal who grows fruits and vegetables to help in his crimes.
- Napoleon Blownapart is a criminal who uses hand grenades to blow up stuff.
- Magneto the Magnificent is a criminal who wields magnetic gauntlets.
- Buster the Ruster is a criminal who uses a spray gun that shoots "rust dust".
- Mike the Mimic is an impersonator.
- Cinderobber is a criminal cleaning lady.
- Mr. Bouncey is a former bouncer who uses a special spray to turn anything into rubber.
- Old King Cruel is a criminal who is the "king of cruelty".
- Victor the Predictor is a criminal who uses a prediction motif.
- Goldyunlocks is a female villain with an obsession of unlocking every lock she sees. Batfink finally defeats her by putting her in a cell with no lock.
  - Phillip "Phil", Billiam "Bill" and Sylvester "Syl" the Three Baers are the henchmen of Goldyunlocks.
- Bowl Brummel is a criminal bowler.
- Harold Hamboné is an opera understudy.
- Adam Blankenstein is a green-skinned criminal whose gun shoots out "blanks" that give people amnesia.
- Whip Van Winkle is a criminal who uses whips in his crimes.
- Tough MacDuff is Batfink's oldest enemy. After being released from prison, he gathered Hugo A-Go-Go and other Batfink villains in a plot to get Batfink to leave town.
- Judy "Jujitsu" Jitsu is a martial artist, whose name is derived from jujutsu, and on whom Karate has a crush.
- Father Time Bomb is a criminal who uses time bombs in his crimes.

== Episodes ==
No.	Title	Story	Animation	Scenics	Original release date
1	"Pink Pearl of Persia"	Heywood Kling	Bill Ackerman	Bob Owen	21 April 1966
Batfink says that he knows who has stolen a huge pearl from the museum, but he refuses to tell who did it. This leads everyone, including the thieves, to believe that he has turned crooked. The three crooks in this episode return in "Crime College".
2	"The Short Circuit Case"	Heywood Kling	Myron Waldman	Bob Owen	21 April 1966
Hugo A-Go-Go (in his first appearance) is using his short-circuit device to make trains and traffic signals go wild.
3	"Ebenezer the Freezer"	Heywood Kling	Myron Waldman	Bob Owen	20 January 1967
Hugo A-Go-Go and Ebenezer the Freezer plan to freeze the entire city, using a missile loaded with freeze gas.
4	"The Sonic Boomer"	(No credit)	Myron Waldman	Bob Owen	20 January 1967
Mr. Boomer, the owner of Boomer Glass Works, is using a jet plane to create window-shattering sonic booms in order to increase business.
5	"Big Ears Ernie"	Heywood Kling	Bill Ackerman	Bob Owen	20 January 1967
Big Ears Ernie is a burglar whose super-sensitive hearing allows him to break into safes and avoid capture. The main battle takes place at a construction site.
6	"Batfink on the Rocks"	Dennis Marks	John Gentilella	Bob Owen	20 January 1967
Hugo A-Go-Go has stolen all the water from Niagara Falls and is selling it for five cents a glass.
7	"Manhole Manny"	Heywood Kling	James Tyer	Bob Owen	20 January 1967
Manhole Manny, who hides out in the sewer, reaches up through manholes to steal things, such as a valuable painting and the wheels off of police cars.
8	"The Mad Movie Maker"	Dennis Marks	I. Klein	Bob Owen	20 January 1967
Mr. M. Flick, the Mad Movie Maker, uses a projected image of a meteor to scare everyone out of the city, leaving him free to loot it.
9	"Nuts of the Round Table"	(No credit)	Myron Waldman	Bob Owen	20 January 1967
Hugo A-Go-Go is sending out robotic knights to commit robberies for him.
10	"Skinny Minnie"	Heywood Kling	Bill Ackerman	Bob Owen	20 January 1967
Skinny Minnie and her gang of rail-thin thugs use their ability to squeeze through tight spaces to commit robberies and hide from the police.
11	"Fatman Strikes Again"	Dennis Marks	Graham Place	Bob Owen	20 January 1967
Someone is stealing valuables from fat men's clubs, so Batfink dons an inflatable "fat suit" to find him.
12	"The Kitchy Koo Kaper"	Heywood Kling	James Tyer	Bob Owen	20 January 1967
Hugo A-Go-Go uses his latest invention, a tickle stick, to render people helpless with laughter.
13	"The Dirty Sinker"	Dennis Marks	Myron Waldman	Bob Owen, John Zago	20 January 1967
Hugo A-Go-Go is using a special submarine to cut through the hulls of ships so he can rob them and then sink them.
14	"Gluey Louie"	Heywood Kling	Bill Ackerman	Bob Owen	3 March 1967
Gluey Louie, who immobilizes people with puddles of glue, steals Benjamin Franklin's kite just as it is being donated to a university.
15	"Brother Goose"	Dennis Marks	Tom Golden, Arnie Levy	Bob Owen, Dave Ubinas	20 January 1967
Brother Goose (whose name is a takeoff of "Mother Goose") is a crook whose crimes and traps are patterned after nursery rhymes. This criminal returns in "Crimes in Rhymes".
16	"The Chocolate-Covered Diamond"	Dennis Marks	Graham Place	Bob Owen	20 January 1967
Two crooks have lost a stolen diamond in a candy factory, so now they are trying to find it by stealing chocolate bars all over town.
17	"Crime College"	Heywood Kling	John Gentilella	Bob Owen	1 March 1967
Hugo A-Go-Go is teaching his students (the three crooks from "Pink Pearl of Persia") how to commit crimes and avoid capture with the help of a heavily armed school bus.
18	"Myron the Magician"	Heywood Kling	Myron Waldman	Bob Owen	20 January 1967
Myron the Magician, who uses magic tricks to commit crimes, steals a valuable painting from a museum and hides out in his specially-gimmicked house.
19	"Brain Washday"	Heywood Kling	I. Klein	Bob Owen	6 February 1967
Hugo A-Go-Go steals a factory's payroll with the help of an instant brainwashing solution that turns people into his willing slaves.
20	"MPFTBRM"	Dennis Marks	Martin Taras	Bob Owen	31 January 1967
Hugo A-Go-Go, using his newly invented MPFTBRM (Millisecond Photo Flash Temporary Blinding Ray Monocle), has stolen a set of secret plans from a diplomatic courier.
21	"Gloves on the Go-Go"	Dennis Marks	Maury Reden	Bob Owen	3 March 1967
Hugo A-Go-Go has invented a pair of flying gloves that steal for him. Because they look like Batfink's gloves, Batfink is contacted by the Chief of Police on that and will be coming after him to arrest his gloves. Now Batfink must thwart Hugo's plot and clear his gloves' name.
22	"Sporty Morty"	Heywood Kling	Bill Ackerman, I. Klein	Bob Owen	13 March 1967
Sporty Morty, who uses sporting equipment to steal things, wants to hunt Batfink and have his head for a trophy.
23	"Go Fly a Bat"	Dennis Marks	Myron Waldman	Bob Owen	31 January 1967
Hugo uses a cap that shoots lightning bolts to steal a gold idol; later, he flies the unconscious Batfink like a kite during a lightning storm.
24	"Ringading Brothers"	Dennis Marks	Bill Ackerman	Bob Owen	1 March 1967
The Ringading Brothers use acrobatic skills to steal valuable rings from people's homes. Their name is a takeoff of both "Ringling Brothers" and the Frank Sinatra song "Ring-A-Ding-Ding".
25	"Out Out Darn Spot"	Dennis Marks	Morey Reden, I. Klein	Bob Owen	3 March 1967
Hugo A-Go-Go invents a spotlight that projects colorful spots to temporarily blind people; he first uses it to steal a valuable dagger, later to trap Batfink. The title is a takeoff of a famous line from Macbeth.
26	"Goo-Goo A-Go-Go"	Heywood Kling	James Tyer	Bob Owen	1 March 1967
Hugo A-Go-Go has built a grenade-throwing robotic baby to help him commit crimes.
27	"Crimes in Rhymes"	Dennis Marks	John Gentilella	Bob Owen	7 April 1967
Brother Goose is back and is committing more crimes based on nursery rhymes.
28	"Stupidman"	Heywood Kling	Graham Place, John Gentilella	Bob Owen	30 March 1967
Stupidman, who commits crimes that no sensible person would try, has stolen a $2 million scimitar; the police are powerless to stop him because he is the Chief's brother-in-law! The crook's name is a parody of "Superman".
29	"A Living Doll"	Dennis Marks	Myron Waldman	Bob Owen	31 January 1967
Hugo A-Go-Go has built a mechanical Batfink lookalike and Karate must determine who is who in order to save Batfink's life.
30	"Bat Patrol"	Heywood Kling	Martin Taras, Morey Reden	Bob Owen	13 March 1967
Hugo A-Go-Go's mechanical soldiers have declared war on law and order. The title is a takeoff of The Rat Patrol.
31	"Dig That Crazy Mountain"	Dennis Marks	Graham Place	Bob Owen	20 January 1967
Professor Vibrato has broken out of jail using his ultrasonic cello and Batfink pursues him to his mountaintop hideout.
32	"Spin the Batfink"	Dennis Marks	Myron Waldman	Bob Owen	6 February 1967
A junk dealer is using a machine to create artificial tornadoes, which steal money and junk for him. This episode contains the first half of a hidden political message; the second half is in "Bride and Doom".
33	"Greasy Gus"	Heywood Kling	James Tyer	Bob Owen	23 March 1967
Greasy Gus, who uses puddles of grease to trip people up, has stolen the police payroll; the police will not work without pay, so it is up to Batfink to bring Gus in.
34	"The Mark of Zero"	Dennis Marks	Myron Waldman	Bob Owen	13 March 1967
Plus A. Minus, alias Zero (a parody of Zorro), has stolen an original manuscript for The Three Musketeers.
35	"Swami Salami"	Heywood Kling	Graham Place	Bob Owen	18 April 1967
Snake charmer Swami Salami uses the Indian rope trick to rob penthouses.
36	"The Human Pretzel"	Dennis Marks	Bill Ackerman	Bob Owen, Bill Focht	24 April 1967
A contortionist called the Human Pretzel has stolen a box of diamonds and is hiding out at a carnival.
37	"Jumping Jewelry"	Heywood Kling	John Gentilella	Bob Owen	30 March 1967
Professor Hopper, owner of a flea circus, uses his trained fleas to steal jewelry.
38	"Roz the Schnozz"	Heywood Kling	James Tyer	Bob Owen	24 April 1967
Roz the Schnozz uses her bloodhound-like nose to sniff out valuables and to avoid the police.
39	"Karate's Case"	Dennis Marks	Bill Ackerman, I. Klein	Bob Owen, Bill Focht	7 April 1967
Someone impersonating Karate has stolen the Gold Hand of Kara-Tay from a museum; Karate, determined to clear his name, insists on taking charge of this case.
40	"The Wishbone Boner"	Heywood Kling	Bill Ackerman, Frank Endres	Bob Owens	1 May 1967
Lucky Chuck, the luckiest crook in town, has stolen a dinosaur wishbone.
41	"Hugo for Mayor"	Dennis Marks	Martin Taras, Morey Reden	Bob Owen	18 April 1967
Marked money from a bank robbery is planted on the Chief and the Mayor as part of Hugo A-Go-Go's plan to get himself elected mayor.
42	"The Indian Taker"	Heywood Kling	Myron Waldman	Bob Owen, John Zago	23 March 1967
Hugo A-Go-Go is using an Indian (i.e., Native American) motif for his latest crime spree "because I don't look good as a cowboy!" The title is a parody of the term "Indian giver".
43	"The Devilish Device"	Dennis Marks	Martin Taras, Morey Reden	Bob Owen	29 May 1967
Hugo A-Go-Go's latest invention makes people behave like animals and he uses it to turn Batfink into a chicken.
44	"Goldstinger"	Dennis Marks	Myron Waldman	Bob Owen	30 March 1967
Hugo A-Go-Go is using a "goldstinger" – a wand that instantly encases people and things in gold plate – to turn the heroes into immobile statues. The title of this cartoon is a parody of Goldfinger.
45	"The Shady Shadow"	Heywood Kling	Martin Taras, Frank Endres	Bob Owen	18 April 1967
Hugo A-Go-Go's machine has brought his shadow to life so that it can commit crimes and fight Batfink for him.
46	"Party Marty"	Heywood Kling	Morey Reden	Bill Focht	1 March 1967
Party Marty, who uses party favors to commit crimes, steals Cleopatra's love letters from a library. A reader in the library keeps shushing people throughout this cartoon.
47	"The Beep Bopper"	Dennis Marks	Myron Waldman	Bob Owen	7 April 1967
Hugo A-Go-Go's newest machine has brainwashed Batfink's BEEP into leading the heroes into one trap after another.
48	"The Super Trap"	Dennis Marks	Martin Taras, John Gentilella	Bob Owen	12 May 1967
Hugo A-Go-Go's electronic jamming device is turning all the machines in the Split-Level Cave against the heroes, including a trap of Batfink's devising that even Batfink cannot escape from. Note: This is the only episode in which Batfink and Karate do not leave the Bat Cave.
49	"Bride and Doom"	Heywood Kling	James Tyer	Bob Owen	1 May 1967
Hugo A-Go-Go has invented a mechanical bride to help him commit crimes; the climax of the action takes place at Niagara Falls. This episode contains the second half of a hidden political message; the first half is in "Spin the Batfink".
50	"Topsy Turvy"	Dennis Marks	Myron Waldman	Bob Owen	24 April 1967
Professor Flippo's invention turns people and things upside-down; he uses it as part of a death trap in which Batfink is trapped.
51	"The Rotten Rainmaker"	Dennis Marks	Martin Taras, Peter Dakis	Bob Owen	8 June 1967
The Rotten Rainmaker's weather-controlling device is raining out a planned rocket launch and he demands $1 million to make it stop.
52	"Gypsy James"	Heywood Kling	Bill Ackerman, Frank Endres	Bill Focht	29 May 1967
Gypsy James is a crooked fortune teller who steals parking meters; he uses a voodoo doll to battle Batfink. His name is a parody of "Jesse James".
53	"The Kooky Chameleon"	Dennis Marks	Graham Place	Bob Owen	19 May 1967
The Chameleon (no relation to the Marvel Comics supervillain) is an art thief from France who uses portable camouflage screens to hide from his pursuers.
54	"Beanstalk Jack"	Heywood Kling	Bill Ackerman	Bob Owen	12 May 1967
Beanstalk Jack (a parody of "Jack and the Beanstalk") is a farmer who uses instant giant beanstalks to commit crimes; he traps the heroes in a Rube Goldberg-style death trap involving a beanstalk.
55	"The Time Stopper"	Dennis Marks	Martin Taras, Jim Logan	Bob Owen	19 May 1967
Hugo A-Go-Go's latest device can stop time itself for everyone but him and he uses it to rob a bank.
56	"The Kangarobot"	Heywood Kling	Myron Waldman	Bob Owen, Bill Focht	1 May 1967
Hugo A-Go-Go has built a robotic kangaroo that can leap tall buildings, provide Hugo with a quick getaway and fight.
57	"Presto-Chango-Hugo"	Dennis Marks	Martin Taras, John Gentilella	Bob Owen	8 June 1967
Hugo A-Go-Go is spraying the entire city with Presto-Chango, a chemical that causes people to switch personalities; as a result of this, Batfink and Karate become each other.
58	"Curly the Cannonball"	Dennis Marks	Bill Ackerman	Bob Owen	30 June 1967
Curly the Human Cannonball is using his routine to break into jewelry stores so he can rob them.
59	"Robber Hood"	Heywood Kling	Myron Waldman	Bob Owen	12 May 1967
Robber Hood (a parody of Robin Hood) uses his archery skills to rob money from banks so he can give it to himself.
60	"Slow Down! Speed Up!"	Dennis Marks	Martin Taras, James Tyer	Bob Owen	1 June 1967
Hugo A-Go-Go's latest device can change the speed of whomever it is aimed at; he is using it to slow down his enemies and speed himself up.
61	"Sandman Sam"	Heywood Kling	Martin Taras, Frank Endres	Bob Owen	21 June 1967
Sandman Sam is committing crimes with the help of his "slumber sand", which can put anyone to sleep; it even turns Batfink's BEEP into ZZZZ.
62	"Yo-Yo A-Go-Go"	Heywood Kling	Martin Taras, John Gentilella	Bob Owen	14 June 1967
Hugo A-Go-Go has a yo-yo which is designed to place a stick of dynamite wherever he wants it to.
63	"Hugo's Hoke"	Dennis Marks	Martin Taras, Jim Logan	Bill Focht	1 June 1967
Hugo A-Go-Go has blanketed the city with "Hoke" – hate-inducing smoke – causing everyone to be distracted from Hugo's crimes by their own constant bickering; as a result of this, even Batfink and Karate are at each other's throats.
64	"Backwards Box"	Dennis Marks	Myron Waldman	Bob Owen	1 June 1967
Hugo A-Go-G-'s latest device makes people and things go backwards; after Batfink escapes from one of Hugo's traps, Hugo uses the box to make him go back into it.
65	"The Great Escapo"	Dennis Marks	Graham Place	Bob Owen	14 June 1967
The Great Escapo escapes from prison and seals Batfink inside four famous traps at the same time, challenging him to get out of them.
66	"Watch My Smoke"	Heywood Kling	Martin Taras, James Tyer	Bob Owen	30 June 1967
Hugo A-Go-Go has an Aladdin-style lamp, which produces a thick black smoke that obeys Hugo's commands.
67	"Daniel Boom"	Heywood Kling	Dave Tendlar, Morey Reden	Bill Focht	21 June 1967
Daniel Boom (a parody of Daniel Boone) uses explosives to commit crimes and to trap the heroes.
68	"Queenie Bee"	Heywood Kling	Bill Ackerman	Bill Focht	29 May 1967
Queenie Bee's trained bees scare away a museum guard so that she can steal a valuable painting.
69	"The Thief from Baghdad"	Dennis Marks	Dave Tendlar, Robert Taylor	Bob Owen	26 June 1967
Sabubu, the Thief from Baghdad, steals a priceless gem from a museum and makes his getaway on a flying carpet; his hideout is a carpet store.
70	"The Mean Green Midget"	Dennis Marks	Tom Golden, Arnie Levy	Bill Focht	12 July 1967
The Mean Green Midget (a parody of the Jolly Green Giant) creates special plants and vegetables to help him commit crimes, such as a flower that sneaks money out of a bank.
71	"Double Double Crossers"	Heywood Kling	Myron Waldman	Bill Focht	8 June 1967
Hugo A-Go-Go claims that an impersonator of him is going to rob the bank and that he himself is innocent. It is really a robot double that Hugo himself built so he can have an alibi for his own crimes.
72	"The Baffling Bluffs of Hugo A-Go-Go"	Dennis Marks	Martin Taras	Bob Owen	15 August 1967
Hugo A-Go-Go fools people into thinking that everyday objects are actually powerful weapons so he can rob them easily.
73	"Napoleon Blownapart"	Heywood Kling	Bill Ackerman	Bill Focht	14 June 1967
In this pun-loaded episode, a lunatic called Napoleon Blownapart (a parody of Napoleon Bonaparte) is using hand grenades to blow up statues in the park.
74	"The Atom Boom"	Dennis Marks	Martin Taras, Jim Logan	Bob Owen	12 July 1967
Hugo A-Go-Go pretends to surrender in order to lure Batfink into a seemingly inescapable trap he calls the Atom Boom (a parody of the atom bomb).
75	"Magneto the Magnificent"	Dennis Marks	Dave Tendlar, Morey Reden	Bill Focht	26 July 1967
Magneto the Magnificent (no relation to the Marvel Comics supervillain) is a crook whose magnetic gauntlets help him to steal things. His voice is modeled after Cary Grant's.
76	"Hugo the Crimefighter"	Dennis Marks	Myron Waldman	Bob Owen	21 June 1967
Hugo A-Go-Go gains a reputation as a costumed crimefighter in order to put Batfink out of business.
77	"The Trojan Horse Thief"	Heywood Kling	Tom Golden, Arnie Levy	Bill Focht	12 July 1967
Hugo A-Go-Go's new vehicle is an armored, heavily armed "Trojan horse" that can tear into vaults.
78	"The Zap Sap"	Dennis Marks	Martin Taras, James Logan	Bill Focht	12 September 1967
Hugo A-Go-Go builds a "flying saucer" and fools everyone into thinking he is an alien.
79	"Unhappy Birthday"	Heywood Kling	Myron Waldman	Bob Owen	26 June 1967
On Batfink's birthday, Hugo A-Go-Go tries a number of ways to destroy him, from a grenade in a gift box to a giant cake with a stick of dynamite for a candle.
80	"Buster the Ruster"	Heywood Kling	Dave Tendlar, Frank Endres	Bob Owen	26 July 1967
Buster the Ruster uses a spray gun loaded with "rust dust" to disintegrate safes and policemen's guns.
81	"Karate's Day Off"	Dennis Marks	Dave Tendlar, Bob Taylor	Bob Owen	14 September 1967
On his day off, Karate is fooled by two crooks into believing that Batfink is their hostage and is forced to help them steal.
82	"Mike the Mimic"	Nick Meglin	Dave Tendlar, Frank Endres	Bob Owen	28 September 1967
Mike the Mimic uses his impersonation skills to trap Batfink and take his place.
83	"Cinderobber"	Heywood Kling	Dave Tendlar, Morey Reden	Bob Owen	3 August 1967
The Chief's new cleaning lady has stolen the police payroll and accidentally left one of her shoes behind; it can only be Cinderobber! (a parody of "Cinderella")
84	"Bouncey Bouncey Batfink"	Dennis Marks	Bill Ackerman	Bob Owen	26 June 1967
Mr. Bouncey, a former bouncer, uses a chemical spray to turn the bridge into rubber and he demands $1 million to "derubberize" it.
85	"The Bomber Bird"	Heywood Kling	Dave Tendlar, James Tyer	Bob Owen	3 August 1967
Hugo A-Go-Go has built a giant mechanical pigeon that drops explosive eggs.
86	"The Copycat Bat"	Heywood Kling	Myron Waldman	Bill Focht	30 June 1967
Using mechanical steel wings, Hugo A-Go-Go impersonates Batfink while stealing the city payroll and Batfink is framed for the crime.
87	"Old King Cruel"	Heywood Kling	Tom Golden, Arnie Levy	Bob Owen	12 September 1967
Old King Cruel (a parody of Old King Cole) steals money from a charity and candy from a baby.
88	"Victor the Predictor"	Dennis Marks	Dave Tendlar, Morey Reden	Bill Focht	14 September 1967
Victor the Predictor publicly predicts that a valuable gem will disappear and Batfink will be destroyed; Victor has secretly arranged for his predictions to come true.
89	"Goldyunlocks and the Three Baers"	Heywood Kling	Bill Ackerman	Bob Owen	26 July 1967
Goldyunlocks (a parody of Goldilocks) robs the bank with the aid of her henchmen, the three Baer brothers.
90	"Jerkules"	Heywood Kling	Martin Taras, James Tyer	Bob Owen	14 September 1967
Hugo A-Go-Go's machine has given him superhuman strength, which he uses to commit crimes under the name "Jerkules" (because he does not want Hercules to sue him).
91	"Hugo Here, Hugo There"	Dennis Marks	Martin Taras, John Gentilella	Bob Owen	15 August 1967
Hugo A-Go-Go's new "here-and-there belt" lets him teleport into and out of bank vaults and send Batfink to random places around the world.
92	"Bowl Brummel"	Nick Meglin	Dave Tendlar, Milton Stein	Bob Owen	4 October 1967
Ex-champion bowler Bowl Brummel (whose name is a play on "Beau Brummell") uses an exploding bowling ball to rob several jewelry stores at once.
93	"Fleiderfink"	Dennis Marks	Tom Golden, Arnie Levy	Bob Owen	15 August 1967
Operatic understudy Harold Hamboné uses a special powder to make the star lose his voice so that he can go on instead. The title is a takeoff of Die Fleidermaus, an opera whose title translates as The Bat.
94	"Blankenstein"	Heywood Kling	Myron Waldman	Bob Owen	3 August 1967
Green-skinned Mr. Blankenstein (whose name is a parody of "Frankenstein") has a gun that shoots "blanks" that blank out people's memories.
95	"Whip Van Winkle"	Heywood Kling	Tom Golden, Arnie Levy	Bob Owen	28 September 1967
When he is not napping, Whip Van Winkle (whose name is a play on "Rip Van Winkle") uses whips to rob people.
96	"Tough MacDuff"	Heywood Kling	Martin Taras, Frank Endres	Bob Owen	4 October 1967
Batfink's oldest enemy Tough MacDuff has been released from prison and has gathered together all of Batfink's foes consisting of Manhole Manny, Big Ears Ernie, Gluey Louie, Stupidman, Skinny Minnie, Whip Van Winkle, Old King Cruel, Cinderobber, Swami Salami, Party Marty, Beanstalk Jack, Queenie Bee, Sporty Morty, and Rozz the Schnozz as well as Hugo A-Go-Go. He is giving the hero an ultimatum: get out of town or be destroyed by the villains.
97	"Judy Jitsu"	Heywood Kling	Bill Ackerman	Bob Owen	28 September 1967
Martial artist Judy Jitsu (whose name is derived from "jujutsu") steals a valuable set of jewelry; the heroes track her down, even though Karate is falling for her.
98	"Ego A-Go-Go"	Dennis Marks	Myron Waldman	Bob Owen	12 September 1967
Hugo A-Go-Go has sprayed Batfink with a chemical called Ego A-Go-Go that has turned him into a narcissist, thus making him easier to fight.
99	"Father Time Bomb"	Heywood Kling	Myron Waldman	Bob Owen	4 October 1967
Father Time Bomb (who resembles Father Time) informs the Chief that he has planted a time bomb somewhere in the city. The heroes look for it, not knowing that it is at police headquarters.
100	"Batfink – This Is Your Life"	Dennis Marks	Myron Waldman	Bob Owen	4 October 1967
Trapped in a seemingly inescapable death trap by Hugo A-Go-Go, Batfink sees his life flash before his eyes and we see how he first became a steel-winged crimefighter. The title is taken from the TV series This Is Your Life.

== Hidden political message ==
According to Dave Mackey's Batfink site, a two-part political message is concealed in two episodes, disguised as sped-up gibberish. Mackey translates the message as follows:

- Part 1 (in "Spin the Batfink"): "The most dangerous force in America today is Walter Reuther and his political machine. It's time we realized that they intend to run this country. When the smut publishers put a..."
- Part 2 (in "Bride and Doom"): "...dirty cover on a clean book, let's take it at face value and call it trash and dump it in the river".

== Production and syndication ==
The cartoon was produced at Hal Seeger Studios, in New York City, and at Bill Ackerman Productions in Midland Park, New Jersey. It was syndicated by Screen Gems and continued to air on local stations throughout the 1980s. Nickelodeon briefly aired episodes of Batfink on Weinerville as well as its Nick in the Afternoon block in 1995 and 1997. In September 2006, it returned to the U.S. as part of "Cartoons Without a Clue", Boomerang's mystery lineup on weekends. MeTV Toons started airing episodes of Batfink in February 2026 as part of the channel's Casper and Company block.

The Batfink series was very popular in the UK, becoming a cult series like the later Danger Mouse, and from 1967 onwards, it was shown at least once every year on UK terrestrial television until 1983, initially on the BBC network, where it was allocated an early evening slot just before the BBC News, and latterly as part of Children's ITV; it subsequently reappeared in 1986 on the ITV Saturday morning magazine show Get Fresh. In the early 1990s, it was repeated again as part of TV-am's Wide Awake Club/Wacaday series; after Wacaday finished in 1992, Batfink was consigned to the vaults in the UK for the next twelve years. It first aired on 6 January 1994 on BBC One during its CBBC Block at the exact time of 16;00.

In 2004, Batfink gained a whole new following, when it was rerun in a number of episodes of the BBC's Saturday morning show Dick and Dom in da Bungalow. From April 2006, it had enjoyed an extended, if somewhat irregular, repeat run on CBBC.

In 2026, MeTV Toons began airing Batfink cartoons, along with other Seeger produced cartoons, during Casper & Company.

Batfink was made quickly and cheaply by re-using stock sequences. Although most serial animations do this to some extent, Batfink did it more than most. Commonly repeated scenes include the intro to the initial briefings by the Chief (the TV screen hotline buzzing into life), Batfink and Karate getting into the Battillac, the Battillac going round mountain bends, the Battillac going over a bridge, Batfink's supersonic sonar radar, and others. Sometimes, the repeated scenes would be cut short, so that sections could be re-used to fit the storyline more closely.

== DVD release ==
- Cinema Club released the complete series on Region 2 DVD on 6 December 2004.
- Shout! Factory released Batfink: The Complete Series on DVD in Region 1 on 3 July 2007.
  - Both DVD boxsets run over four DVDs and contain all 100 episodes of the series.
- In January 2007, A-Design released a single Batfink DVD in Bulgaria, which includes 26 5-minute segments.

== See also ==
- List of local children's television series (United States)
