= Al Sack =

American musician (1911–1947)

Al Sack (circa 1946)

Al Sack (January 3, 1911 – December 6, 1947) was a conductor, composer, arranger, and violinist whose career spanned from the late 1920s up until his death in 1947. He is primarily associated with his work on radio and records through partnerships with artists like Tony Martin, Andy Russell, Gracie Fields, Dinah Shore, and Roy Rogers.

== Biography ==
Albert E. Sack was born in New York, New York, to Stara and Benjamin Sack. His parents settled early on in his life in Cleveland, Ohio, where his musical talents were developed through the study of violin and composition technique. His father, a tailor by trade, was an amateur musician and planted the seed of love for music in his son. Al Sack credited his violin skills, which received considerable acclaim throughout his life, to his teacher, Rudolph Ringwall (assistant conductor of the Cleveland Symphony Orchestra, 1926–1934).

In 1928, at the age of 17, he received his first professional job as a violinist in the orchestra of the NBC radio affiliate in Cleveland. He stayed with the orchestra for six years, where he would ultimately conduct. From 1936 to 1938 he toured the U.S. and Canada as a conductor with the highly popular vaudevillian comedy team of Olsen and Johnson. After the tour ended he moved to Los Angeles where he became the first violinist with the KHJ radio orchestra.

From 1940 through 1943, Sack expanded his talents by arranging for David Rose on the California Melodies program. The show included Hollywood stars like Dinah Shore, Gracie Fields, Ginny Simms, and Frank Sinatra. During this time Sack came to the attention of Paul Whiteman, who hired him in the summer of 1943 to be his associate director and chief arranger. The partnership with Paul Whiteman led to Sack's hiring as the music director for the NBC Blue Network, where he worked on many shows, including The Beulah Show and The Adventures of Maisie. A few of the stars that he conducted for at the network included Tony Martin, Eddie Cantor, Andy Russell, Ann Sothern, Fred Astaire, and Dinah Shore.

Sack's work also extended to motion pictures, where he went largely uncredited. In 1939 he served as a violin double for Leslie Howard in David Selznick's picture, Intermezzo. Beginning in 1944 he began working with Walt Disney Studios as an orchestrator and conductor on the films The Three Caballeros, Make Mine Music, and Melody Time — he received credit for the latter.

In 1945 Sack began recording for Black and White Records. During a period of less than two years he made three highly successful albums under his own name called Velvet Moods, Latin Moods, and Magic Moods. Some of his popular compositions, included “Moonlight Memoirs,” “Midnight Reveries,” “Love You Dearly,” and “In a Breeze."

He was the musical director for the 1946 Disney animated feature Make Mine Music. However, Sack is not listed in the credits of the film as the musical director, this distinction goes to Charles Wolcott. Sack is listed under Special Arrangements, along with Vic Schoen, in the 1948 Disney animated feature "Melody Time".

His health suffered throughout his life from rheumatic heart disease, which afflicted him since a child. On December 6, 1947, he suffered a fatal heart attack with the official cause of death listed as bronchial pneumonia. He was survived by his wife, Rose (1912-1972), and his daughter, Stara (1937-2011).

== Tony Martin ==
Tony Martin, Al Sack, and Jimmy Wallington. Al Sack receives a Gold Cup Distinguished Radio Award.

Throughout the mid-1940s Sack also worked extensively with singer Tony Martin. Most notably he served as the music director for The Tony Martin Show on radio, which resulted in the 1946 Gold Cup Distinguished Radio Award by Orchestra World magazine. He also produced a number of hit singles on Mercury Records with Tony Martin. One record, "To Each His Own," achieved a gold record sales certification.

== Discography ==
- Velvet Moods (Black and White Records, 1947)
- Latin Moods (Black and White Records, 1947)
- Magic Moods (Black and White Records, 1947)
