= Dusty Fletcher =

African-American vaudeville performer

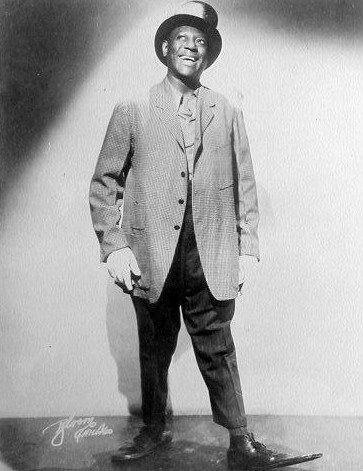
Dusty Fletcher

Clinton "Dusty" Fletcher (July 8, 1900 – March 15, 1954) was an African-American vaudeville performer and comedian, who was best known for the comedy routine which became a hit record in 1947, "Open the Door, Richard".

== Routine "Open the Door, Richard!" ==
Born in El Dorado, Arkansas, Fletcher refined his act over at least twenty years in vaudeville before the 1940s. He would come on stage dressed in rags, acting drunk, muttering and complaining about trying to find his way home. He would then bring out a ladder, and try to set it up so he could get in through a window. Every so often he would crash sprawling on the floor while shouting "Open the Door, Richard!".

== Revue Fast and Furious ==
In August and September 1931 Clinton (Dusty) Fletcher was one of 90 performers in the all Negro revue, Fast and Furious, produced by Forbes Randolph. The revue was performed at the Brantd's Boulevard Theater and later at the New York Theater on Broadway. Fletcher performed in at least five numbers, Football Game, in which he played the Captain of Lincoln's Team; Ham What Am, in which he played Dusty; Macbeth, in which he played MacDuff; The Silent Bootlegger, in which he played the bootlegger; and in Clinton Dusty Fletcher in which he played himself in his comedy act.

== Song and recording "Open the Door, Richard!" ==
In 1946, bandleader Jack McVea fashioned Fletcher's routine into the lyrics of a song, which he recorded with his band. McVea's record became a big hit, and Fletcher, by now semi-retired, was found living in South Carolina by Herb Abramson of National Records. He made his own recording of the song, using McVea's arrangement, which made number 3 on US Billboard R&B chart. It sold in excess of one million copies. The song was also covered by many others including Count Basie, Louis Jordan, and Pigmeat Markham.

National Records began a lawsuit to claim Fletcher's royalties as the originator of the routine which led to McVea's hit. However, a blackface vaudeville comedian, John "Spider Bruce" Mason then claimed that Fletcher had originally stolen the routine from him in the 1920s. Eventually, McVea, Fletcher and Mason were all co-credited with writing McVea's version.

The National Association for the Advancement of Colored People (NAACP) publicly attacked the song, particularly Fletcher's version, for making light of public drunkenness and playing on the stereotype of black men as shiftless and ignorant.

Fletcher continued to perform the routine, particularly at the Apollo Theatre in New York, until shortly before his death.

== Family ==
Fletcher had one daughter Helen Fletcher with original Cotton Club dancer Sadie Mae Fletcher. He had two granddaughters.

== Filmography ==
- Hi De Ho (1947)
- Boarding House Blues (1948)
- Killer Diller (1948)
