= Subaru WRX =

Compact sports car

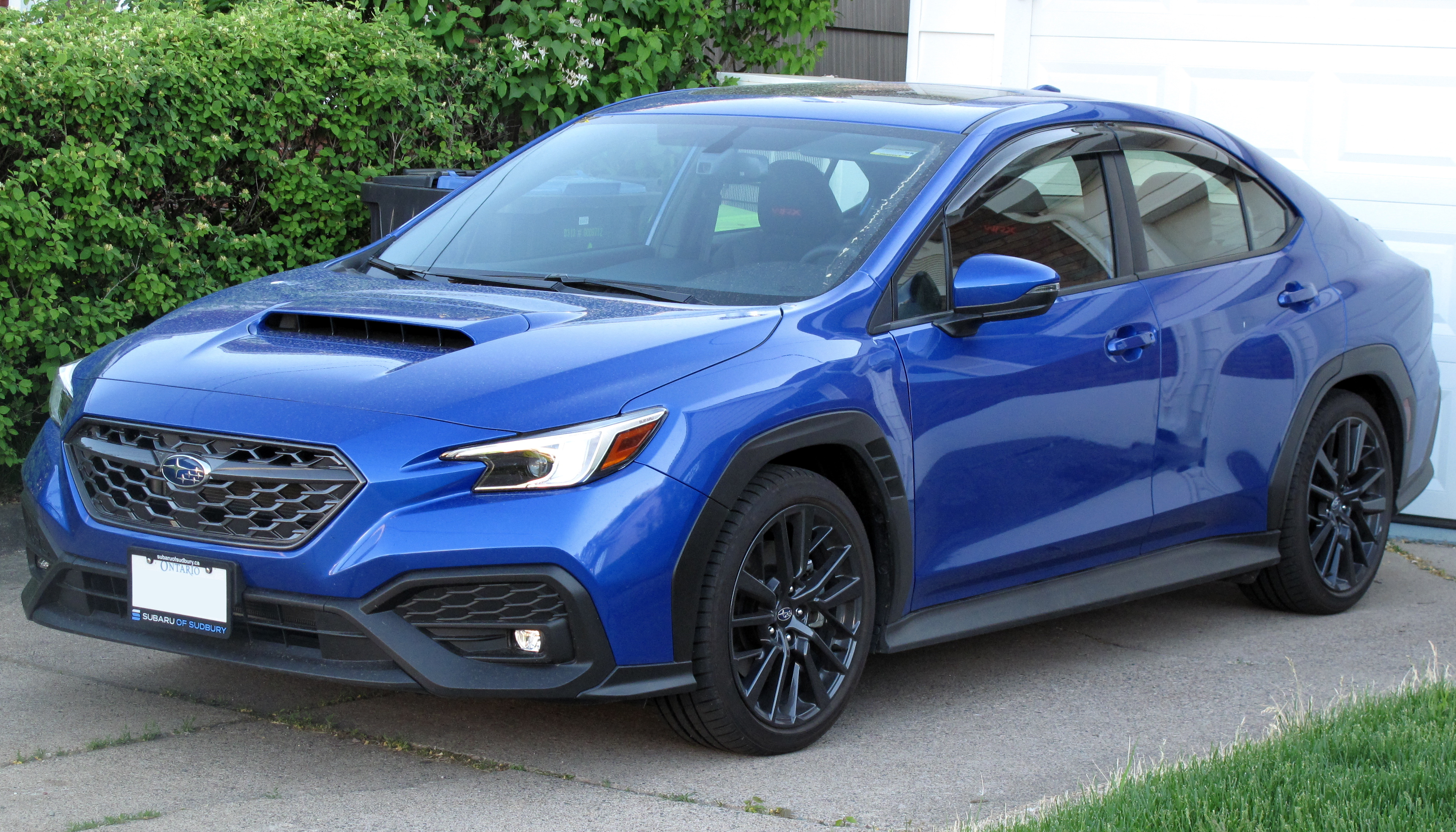
- 2022 WRX Sport-Tech

Overview
- Manufacturer: Subaru
- Also called: Subaru Impreza WRX (1992–2014)
- Production: 1992–2014 (Impreza-based models); 2015–present (standalone models)
- Assembly: Japan: Ōta, Gunma (Main Plant)

Body and chassis
- Class: Sport compact car
- Body style: 4-door sedan (standalone models)
- Layout: Front-engine, four-wheel-drive
- Related: Subaru Levorg; Subaru WRX STI

The Subaru WRX is an all-wheel drive sport compact car manufactured by the Japanese automaker Subaru, originally based on the Impreza created for the World Rally Championship in 1992. Subaru claimed the name WRX stands for "World Rally eXperimental". Starting with the 2015 models, the WRX lineup has been split from the Impreza, with a different body style that is not offered as an optional hatchback/wagon, being introduced as the separate Levorg model.

== STI ==
In 1988, Subaru created Subaru Tecnica International (STi) as its motorsport division to develop and compete in the FIA World Rally Championship and other motorsports activities. Following the introduction of the first generation Impreza in November 1992 and the following year's debut of the Group A rally car into the WRC, an 'STi version' was made commercially available in January 1994 as a homologation model under FIA regulations. Thereafter, subsequent evolutions dubbed STi Version or simply STI were manufactured and sold alongside the Impreza model lineup initially in Japan only and later in selected world markets. As the STi or STI model was typically the highest spec of the Impreza, it has become popular with performance enthusiasts, tuners and amateur racers in many motorsports disciplines especially rallying and circuit driving.

Subaru has released many different models and versions including special limited editions of the WRX STI. However many of these versions were and are only available in the Japanese Domestic Market. Although the concept behind the STI model is taking a base model such as the Impreza or Legacy and further developing it for high performance, STI models fall mainly into 2 categories. The first is a fully developed and tested model with the purpose of homologating it for motorsports which is sold as a street legal road car. The second is a complete car pre-fitted from the factory with parts that are available from the STI catalogue and marketed as a 'Tuned by STI' model. Spin-off models with mainly cosmetic additions or alterations are also marketed usually in limited quantities.

== Impreza-based models (1992–2014) ==
The first three generations of the WRX, sold until the 2015 model year, were based on standard Impreza platforms, and replaced the Subaru RX hatchback and saloon.

First generation (GC/GF/GM), 1992–2000

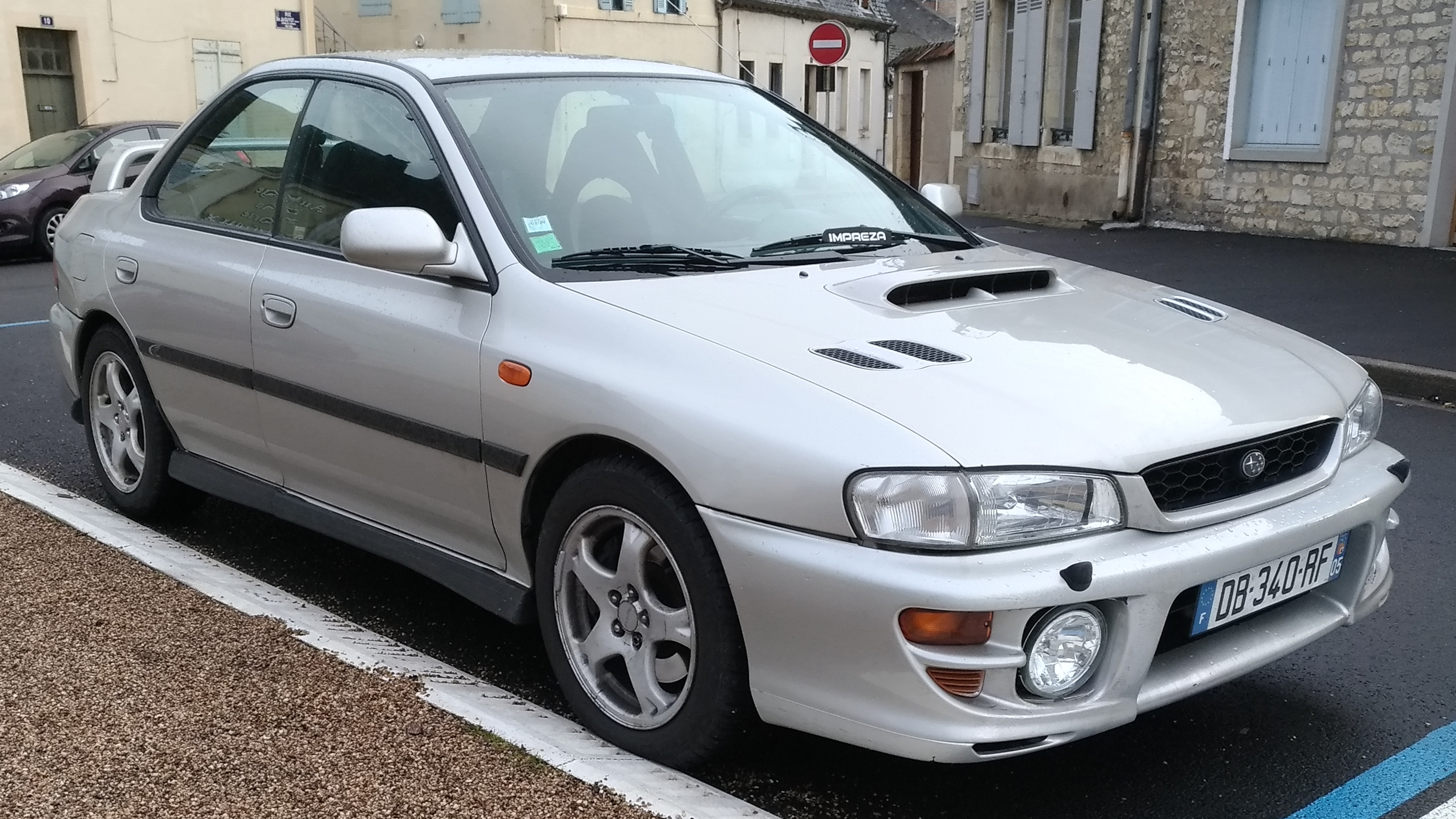
2000 Subaru Impreza GT (European WRX equivalent) (GC)

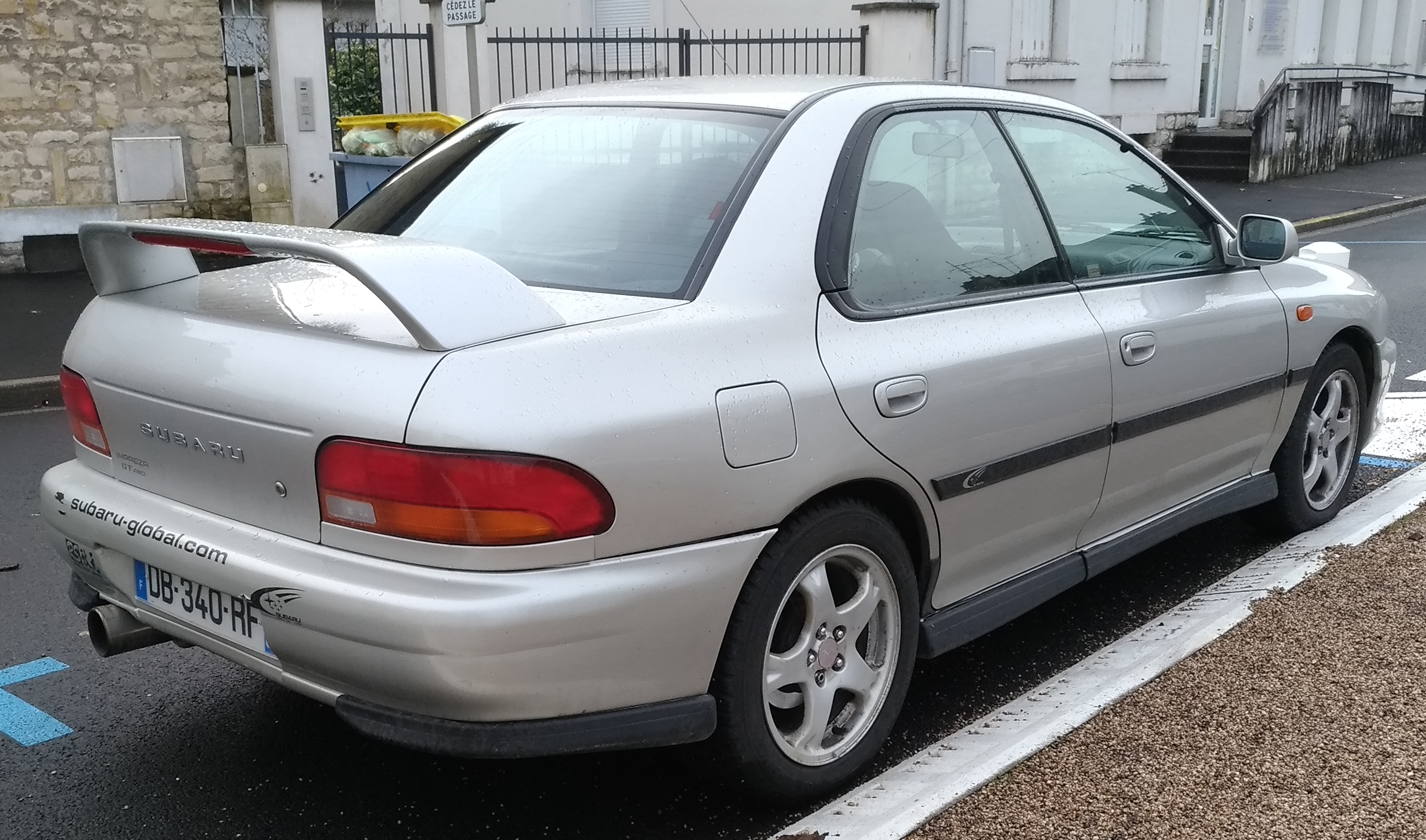
2000 Subaru Impreza GT (GC)

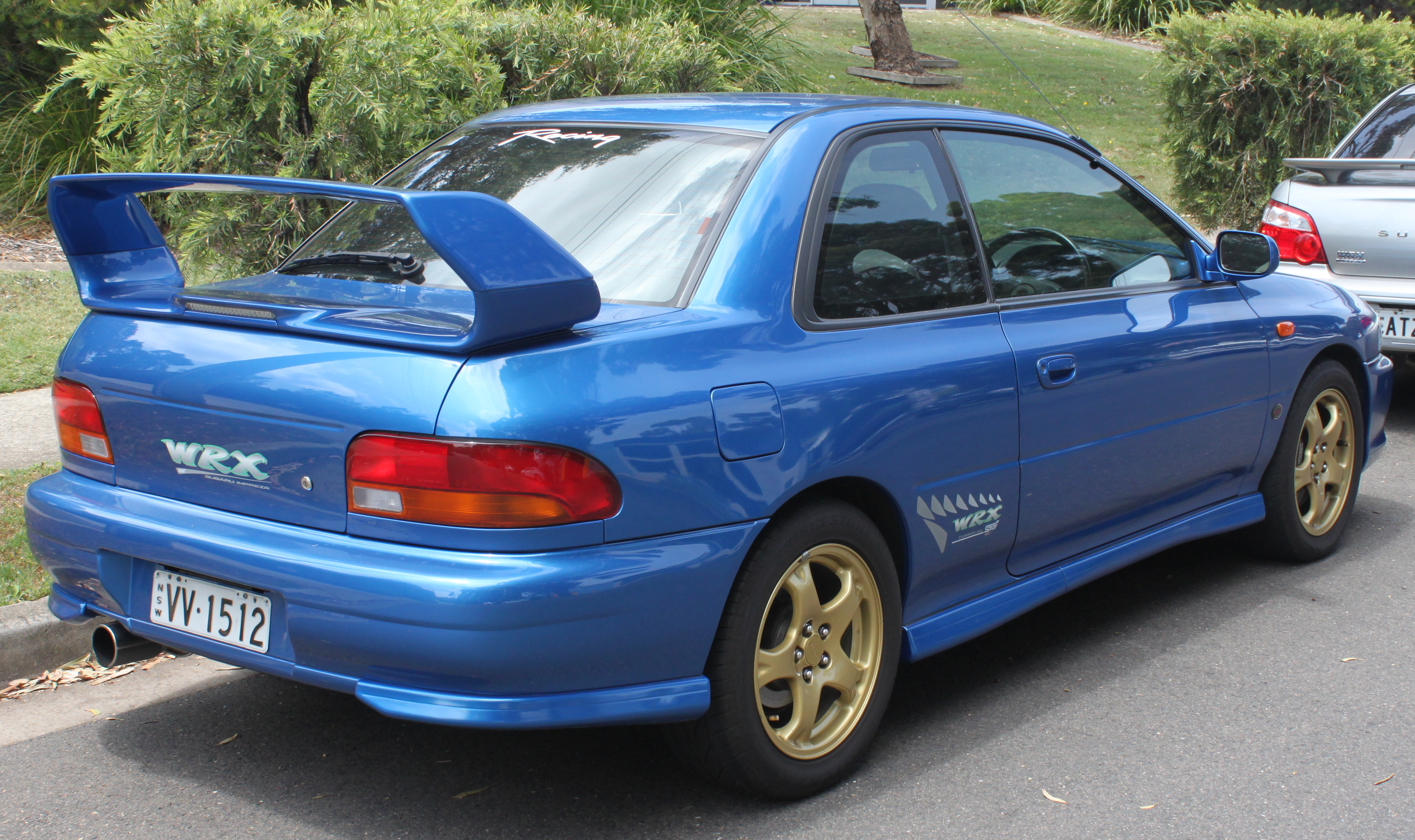
1999 Subaru Impreza WRX STI (GM)

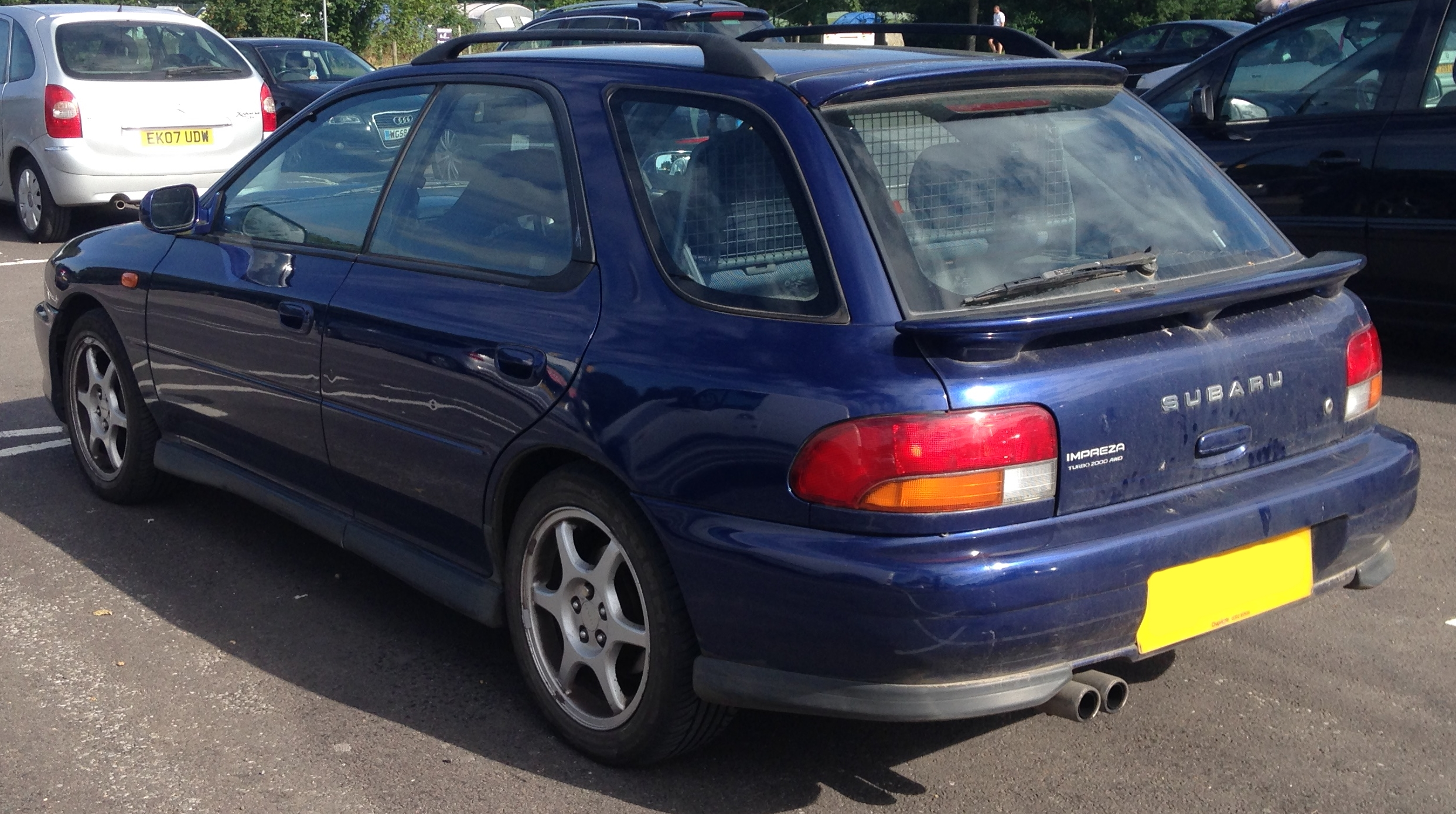
2000 Subaru Impreza Turbo 2000 (UK WRX equivalent (GF)

The initial first-generation WRX models were based on the Impreza saloon (GC chassis code). They were followed by wagons (GF) in 1993 and the first upgraded WRX STi version, introduced in 1994. Several limited edition first-generation coupés were offered in the late 1990s and early 2000s which were never sold in the US and are highly sought after by Subaru enthusiasts.

Second generation (GD/GG), 2000–2007

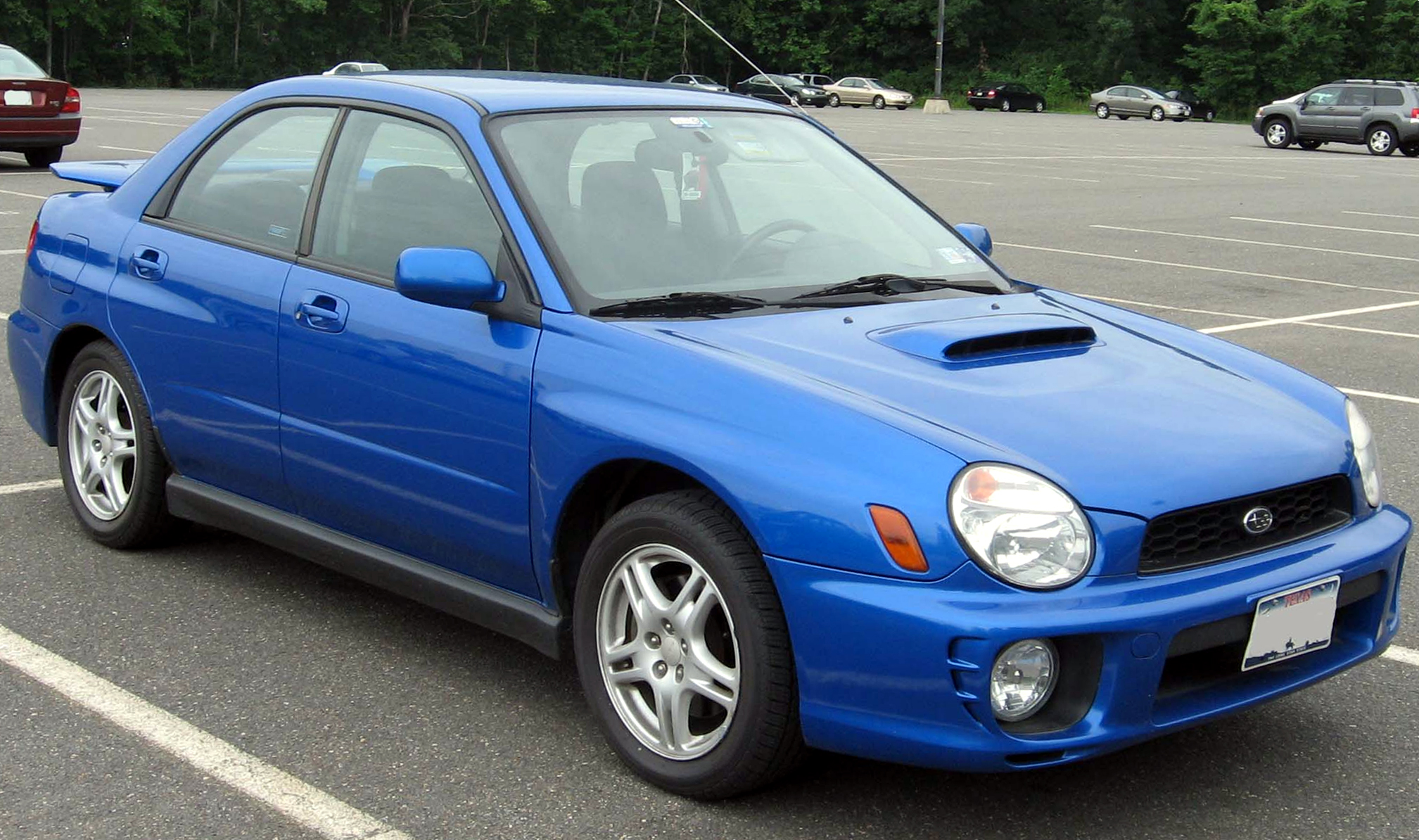
2002 Impreza WRX (GD, pre-facelift, US Model)

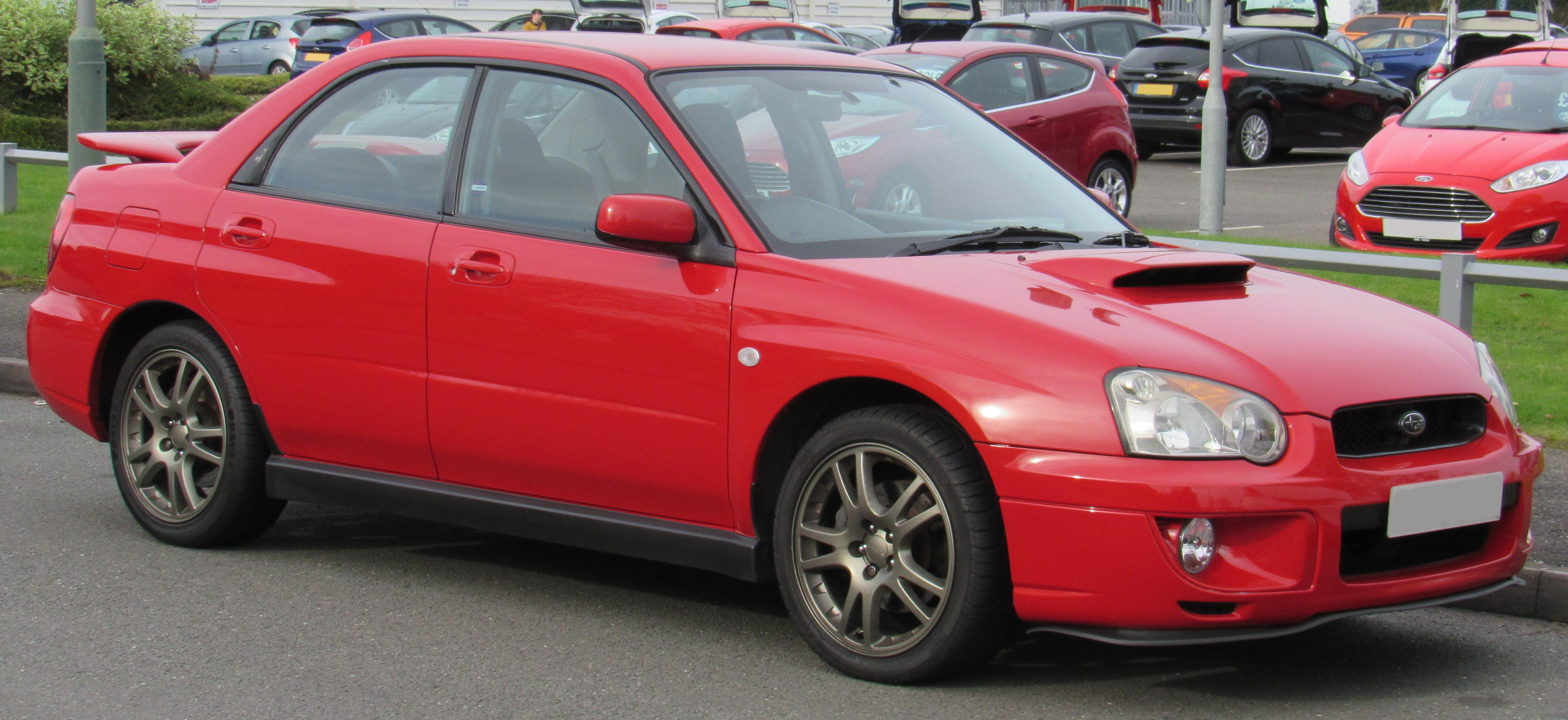
2003 Impreza WRX (GD, first facelift, European Model, grey STI wheels)

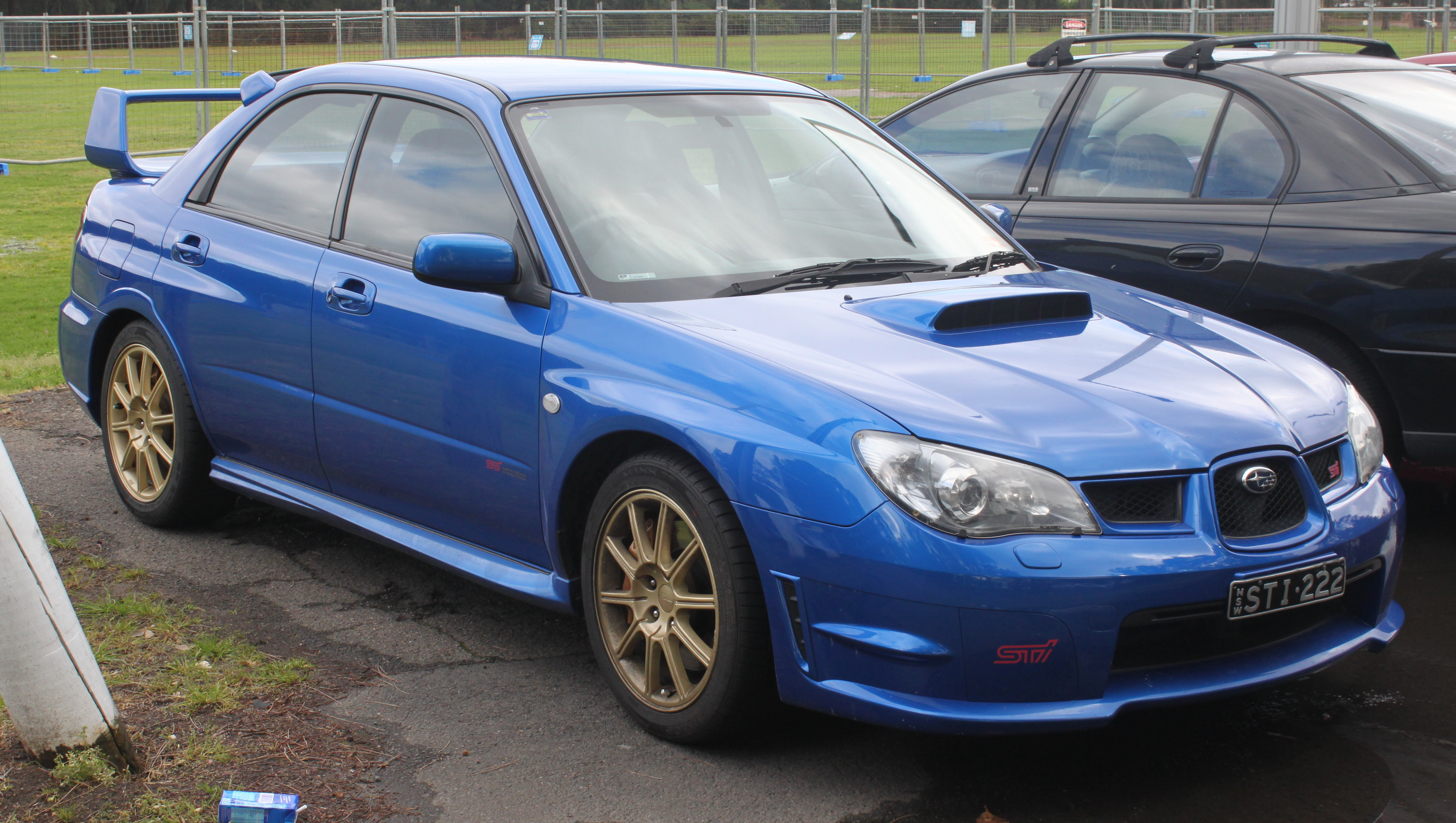
2006 Impreza WRX STI (GD; second facelift, European Model)

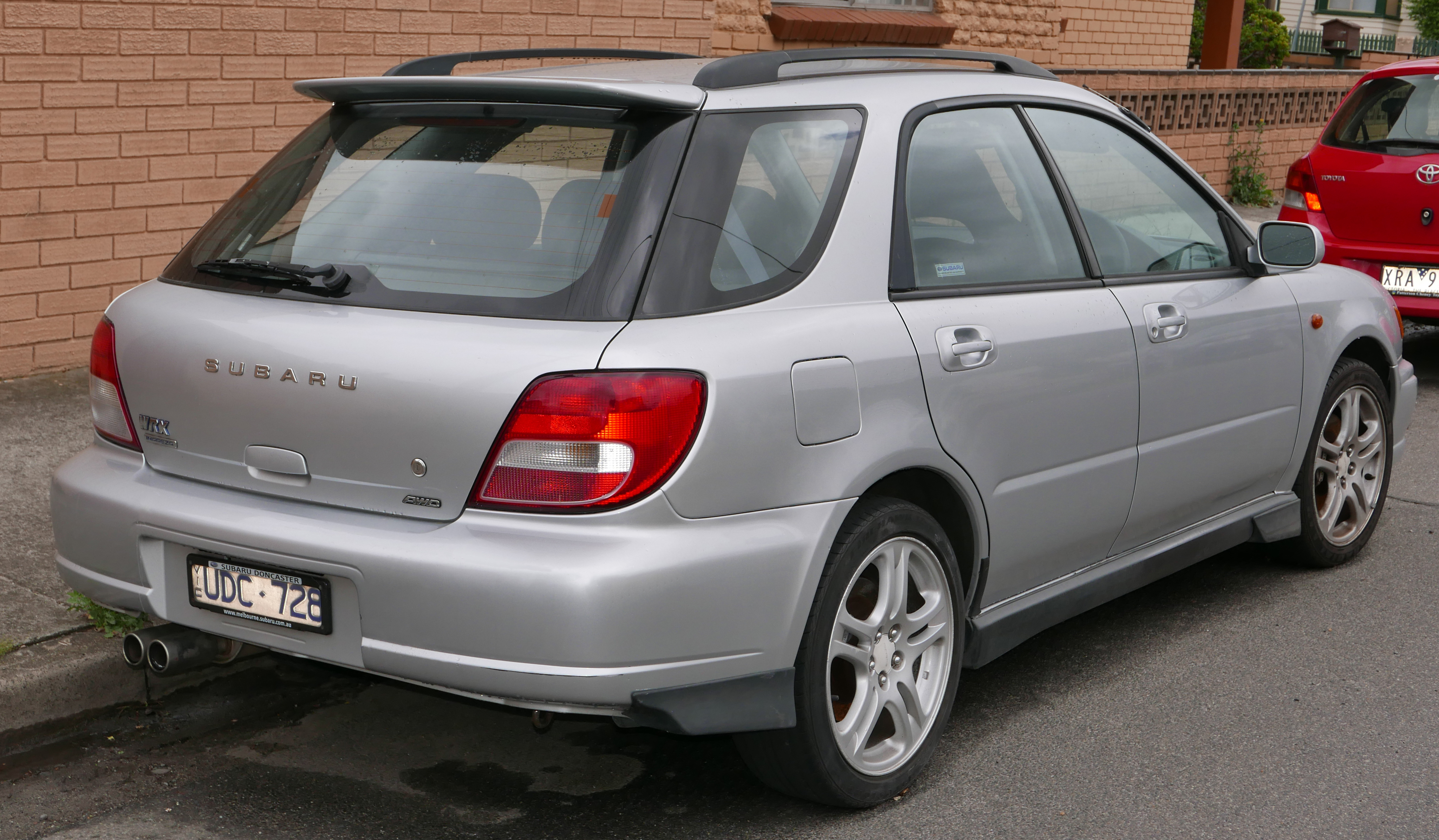
2001 Impreza WRX (GG, wagon, Australia)

The second-generation WRX (GD/GG chassis codes for the saloon/wagon, respectively) was brought over to the United States domestic market for model year 2002, with the STI being brought over for model year 2004. The initial "bugeye" front end styling (2000) was superseded by the "blobeye" in 2004 and the "hawkeye" in 2006. Under an agreement between Fuji Heavy Industries and General Motors, Saab sold its own version of the WRX, marketed as the Saab 9-2X, for the 2005 and 2006 model years. The 9-2X was available in both a standard (Linear) and performance (Aero) package, the latter was essentially identical to the second-generation WRX wagon, mechanically.

Third generation (GE/GH & GV/GR), 2007–2014

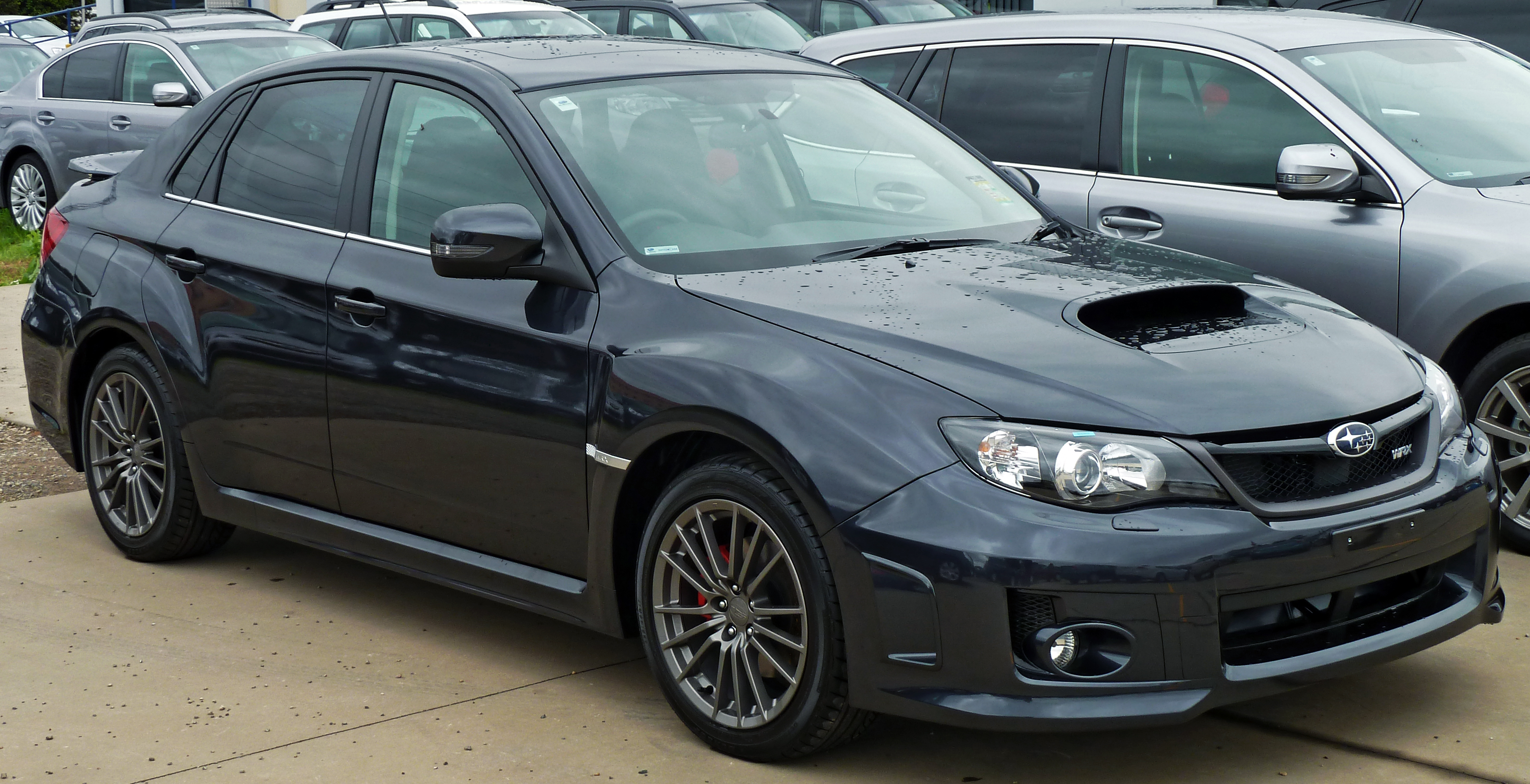
2010 Impreza WRX (GE, Facelift, Australia)

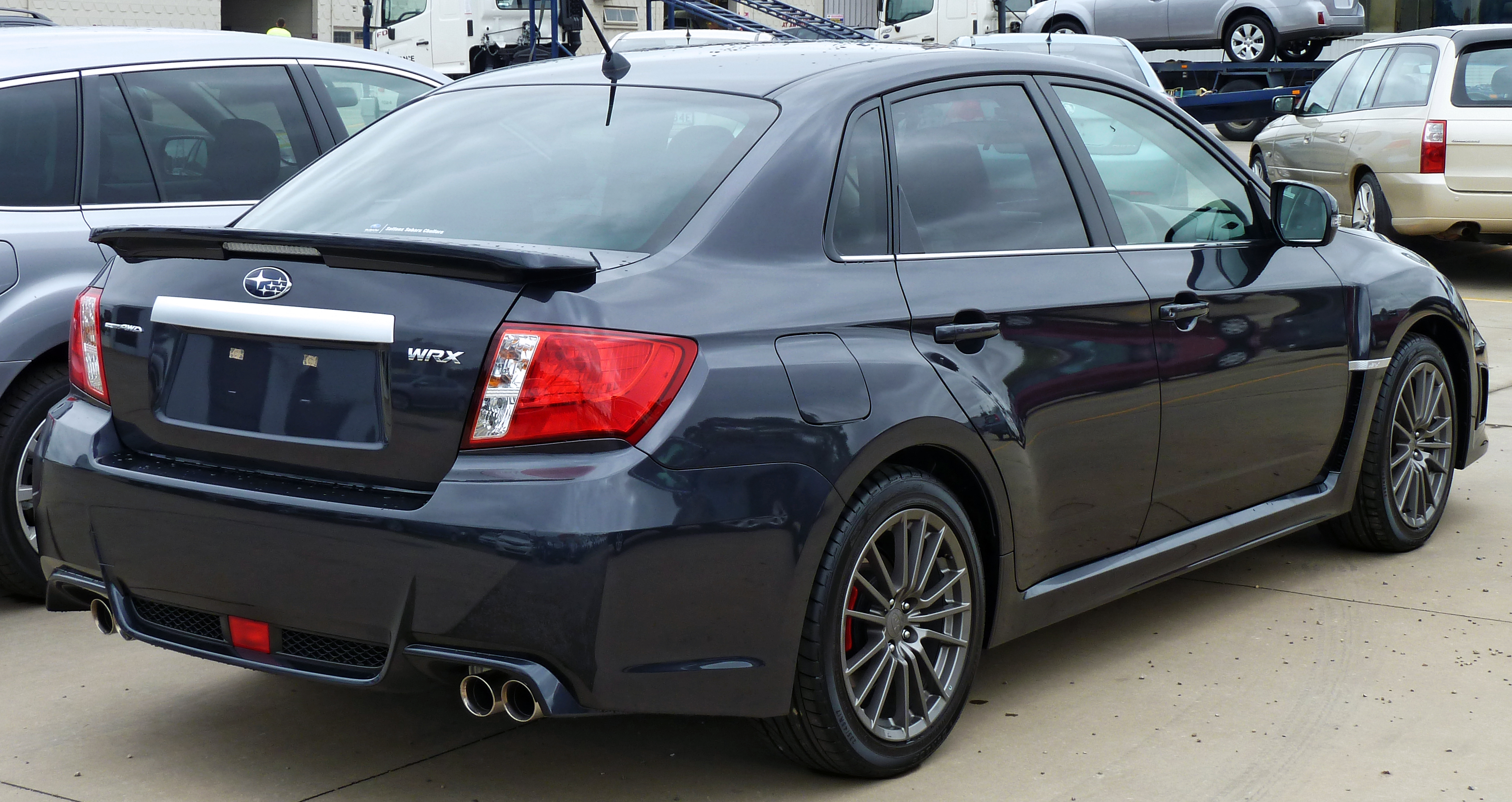
2010 Impreza WRX (GE, Facelift, Australia)

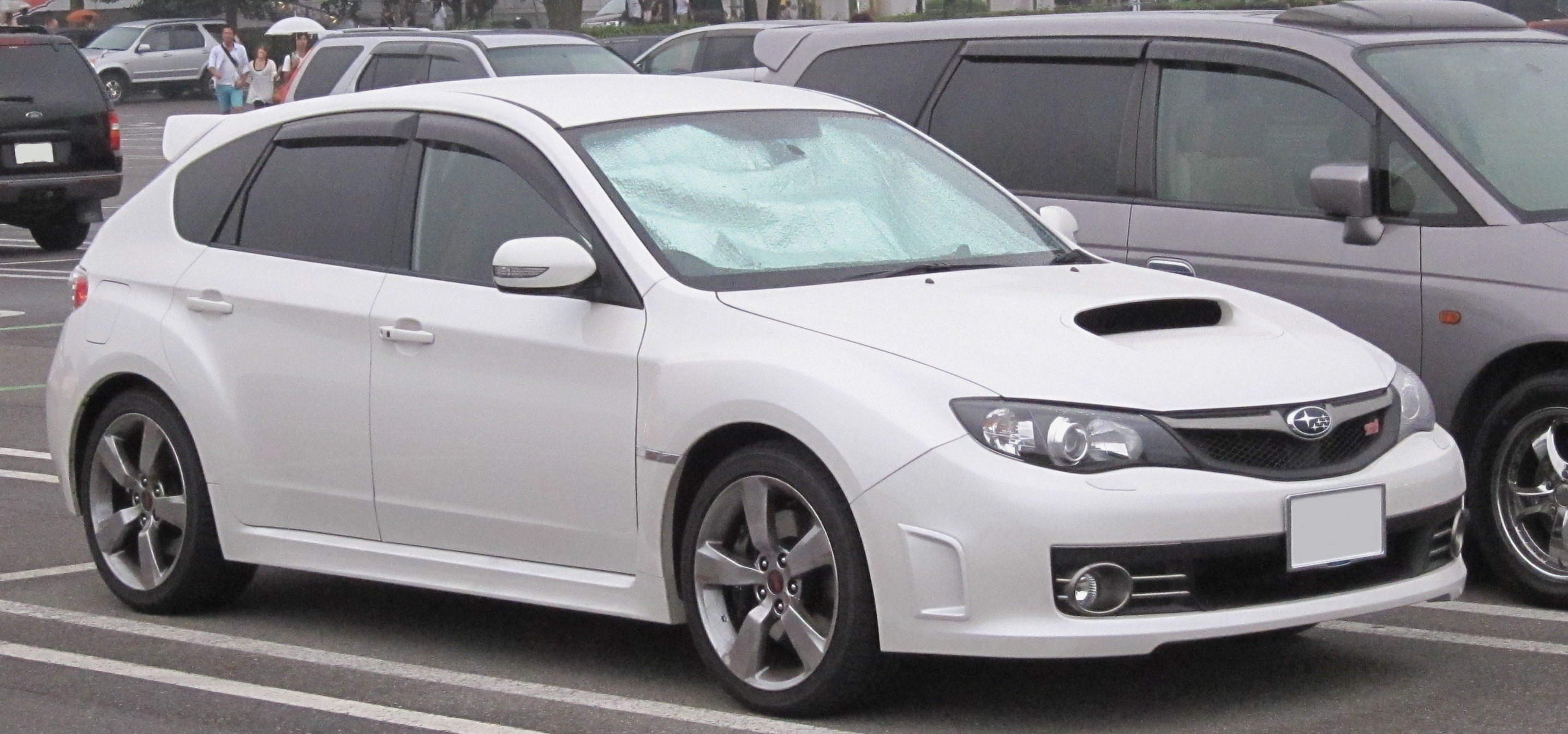
Impreza WRX STI (GR)

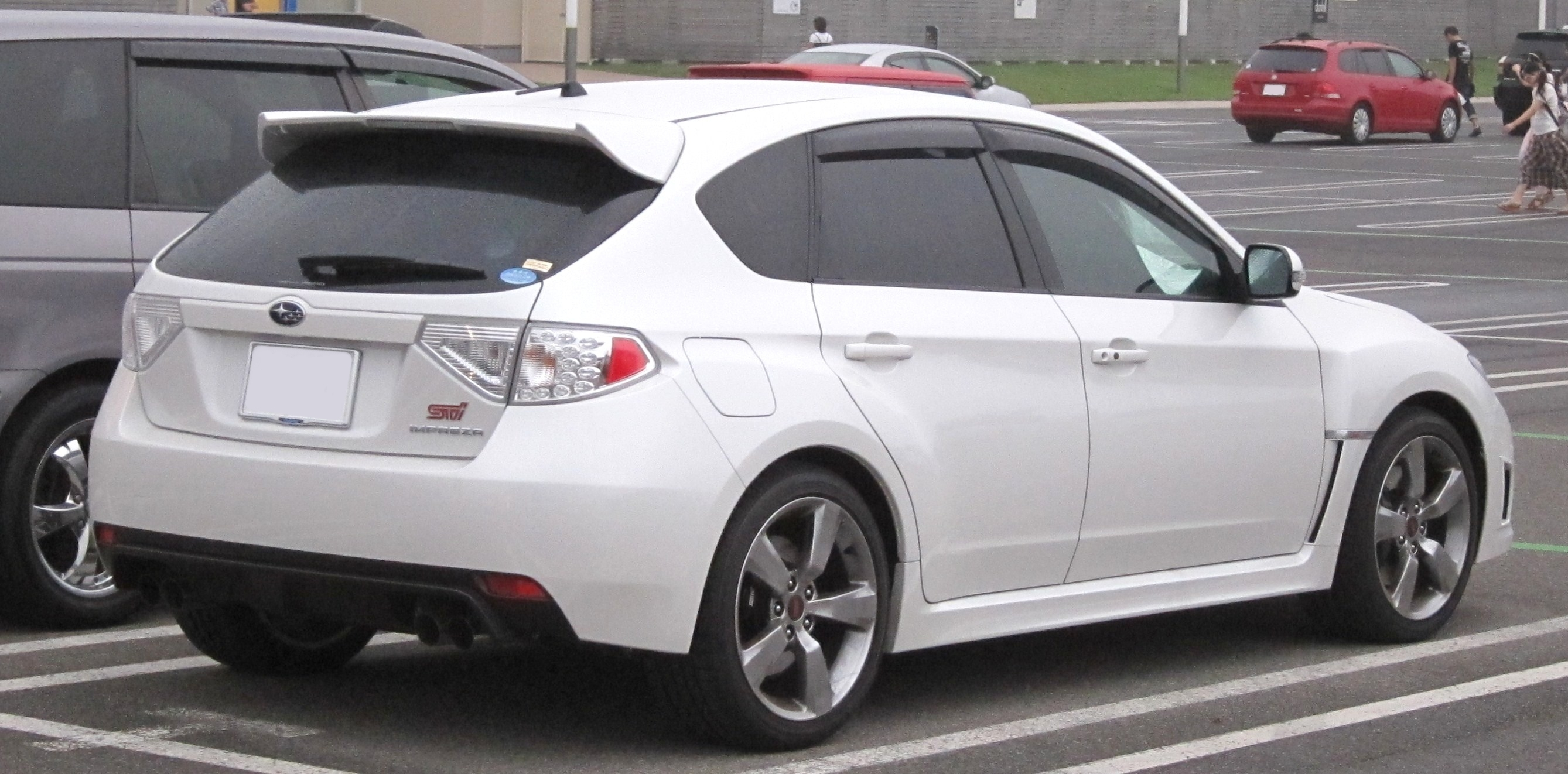
Impreza WRX STI (GR)

The third-generation WRX were sold as chassis codes GE (saloon) and GH (hatchback, replacing the earlier wagon version) initially; the third-generation WRX STI was sold with a widened chassis and was available only as a widebody hatch (GR). For the 2011 model year, the third-generation WRX saloon and hatch were moved to the GV and GR wide-body chassis variants, respectively, and a widebody saloon version of the STI (GV) was marketed. The Impreza was redesigned and the fourth-generation was first marketed for model year 2012, making it a distinct model from the WRX, which continued on the third-generation GV/GR chassis until 2014 in most markets.

The fourth-generation WRX were given the VA chassis designation and marketed as a separate model from the Impreza starting in 2015.

== WRC ==
The Subaru Impreza WRC is a World Rally Car based on the Subaru WRX. It was used by Subaru World Rally Team, Subaru's factory team, and replaced the Subaru Legacy RS in 1993. The car was debuted at 1993 Rally Finland and won a total of six world rally titles, including three consecutive manufacturers' titles and three drivers' titles.

=== Group A Impreza GC, 1993–1996 ===
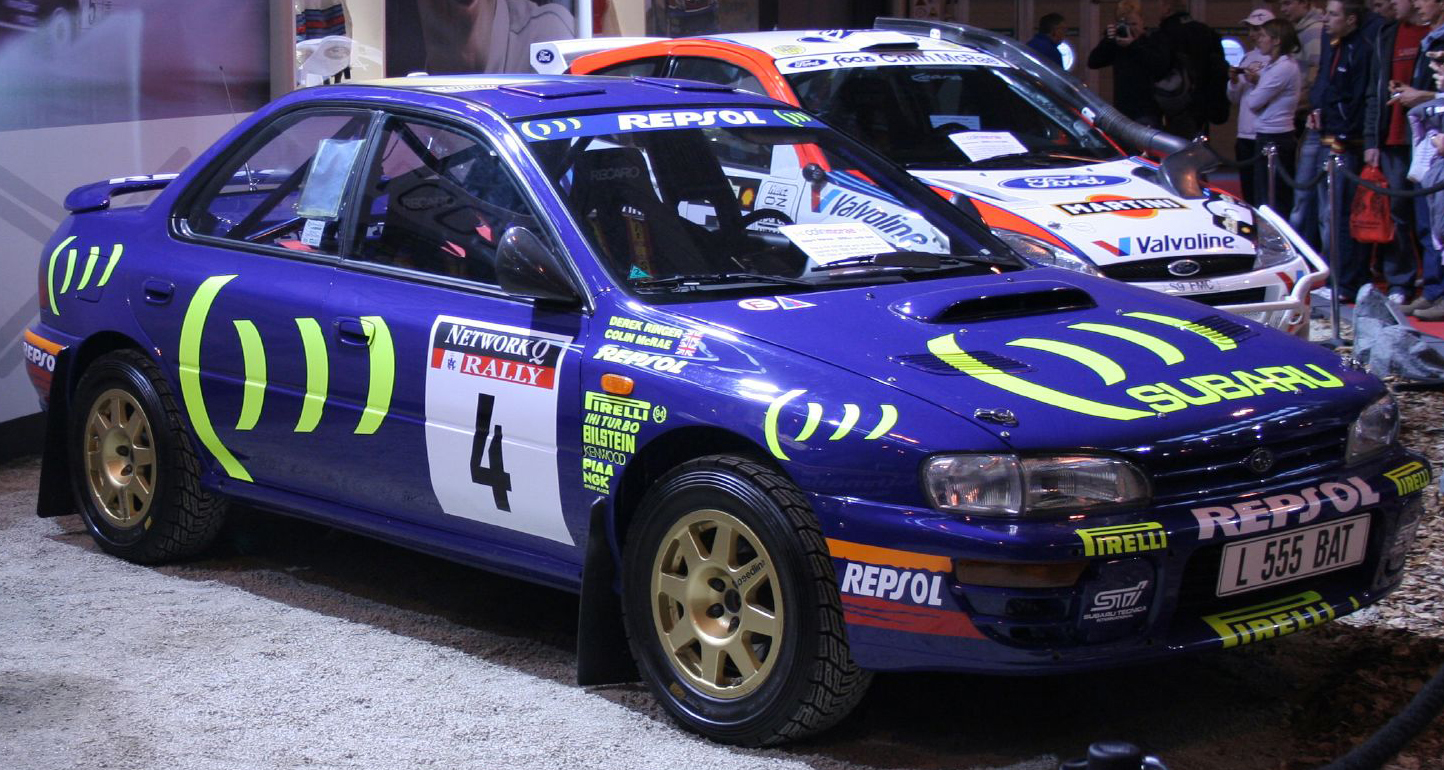
Colin McRae's 1995 Group A Impreza 555

For 1993, Prodrive recognized that a smaller, nimbler car would make a better platform for a rally car, and work on a Group A Impreza rally car began. It was 160 mm shorter in overall length with a 60 mm shorter wheelbase, as well as having a more neutral front/rear weight ratio. It also featured active differentials, a first for a rally car. At the 1000 Lakes Rally, Subaru debuted their new Prodrive developed Impreza derived Group A rally car, driven by Vatanen and Alén. Vatanen drove the car to second place on its debut.

In 1994, the Subaru team switched from Michelin to Pirelli tires.

For the 1995 season, the FIA mandated more restrictive air intakes in an effort to slow the cars down. Subaru countered this by introducing a new boxer engine with revised camshafts and a different compression ratio.

=== World Rally Car Impreza GC, 1997–2001 ===
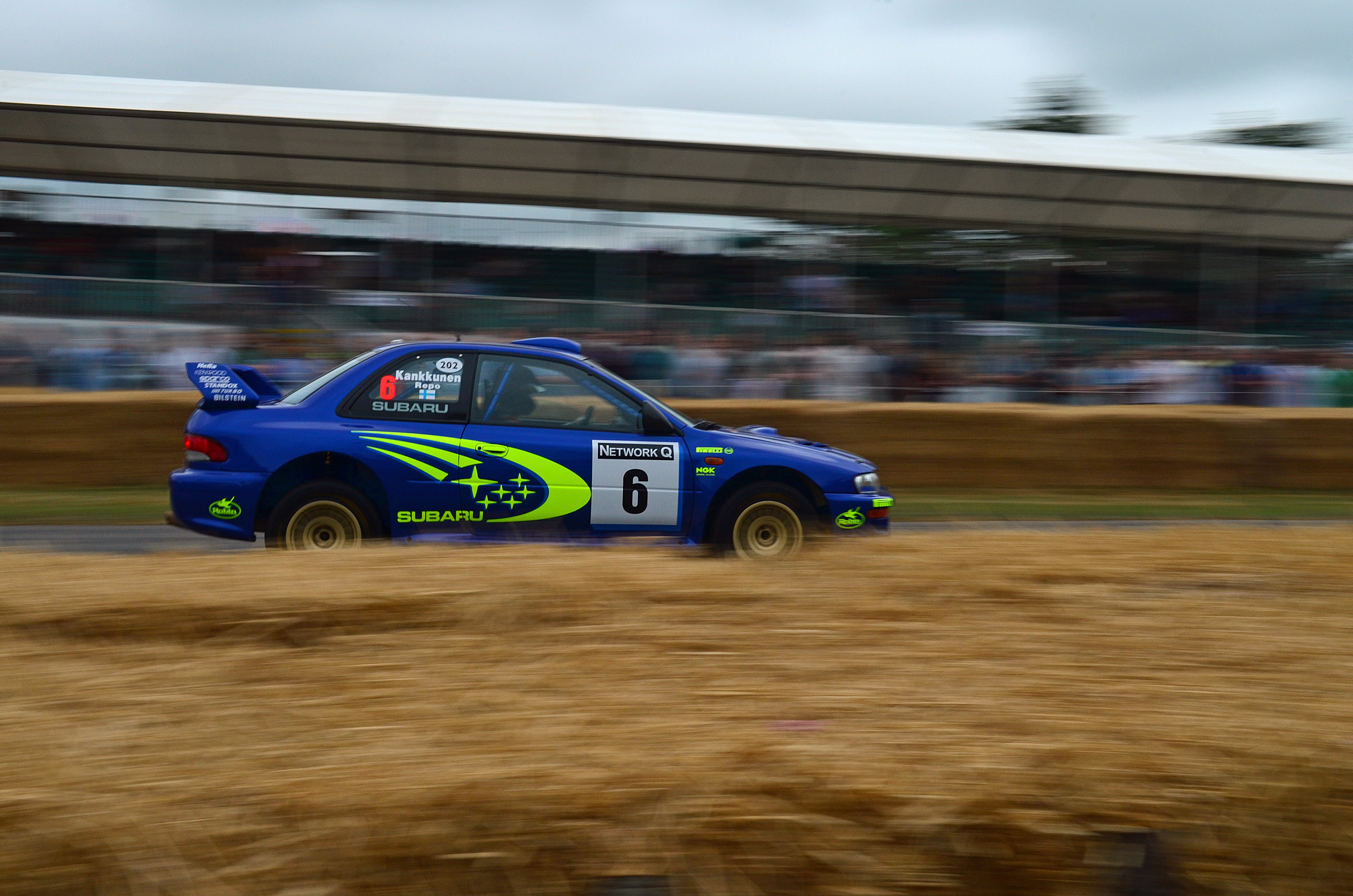
The first Prodrive WRC Car from 1997.

For 1997, the FIA replaced the Group A formula with a new formula called World Rally Car. This gave teams greater latitude in design and materials including vehicle width, suspension geometry, aerodynamics, intercooler capacity and engine modifications. This led to a totally redesigned car, the WRC97, featuring modified camshafts, cylinder ports and combustion chambers. The new body had two doors. The width of the car increased to 1,770 mm (69.9 in) with a revised suspension geometry. Power increased to 224 kW (300 hp) @ 5500 rpm, and torque was now 470 N⋅m (347 lb⋅ft).

The Impreza WRC98 was an evolution of the earlier WRC97, with computer controlled active differentials in the front, rear, and centre, and an electronic throttle. Mechanical failures were common and took the team out of contention for the title.

The WRC99, introduced at the first round of the championship, featured an electronically controlled, hydraulically actuated semi-automatic transmission with a drive-by-wire throttle, allowing the cars to be shifted with steering wheel mounted paddles, similar to F1 cars. This allowed the driver to shift gears faster, and reduced the chance of dog gear wear. Due to technical difficulties, the team struggled until the season's 7th round in Argentina. However, the car helped prove much of the technology seen on later cars. Subaru was the first rally team to implement this technology, which has been used on all WRC cars until it was forbidden by the 2011 championship rules.

Although the WRC2000 looked almost identical to the WRC99, underneath the sheet metal, its execution was radically different. Developed by Prodrive engineer Christian Loriaux, the team used the lessons learned from the WRC99 and applied them in the WRC2000's 10-month development, in which over 80% of the car's mechanical and electronic components were redesigned. The car debuted, and drove to victory, at the fourth event of the season, Rally Portugal.

=== World Rally Car Impreza GD, 2001–2008 ===
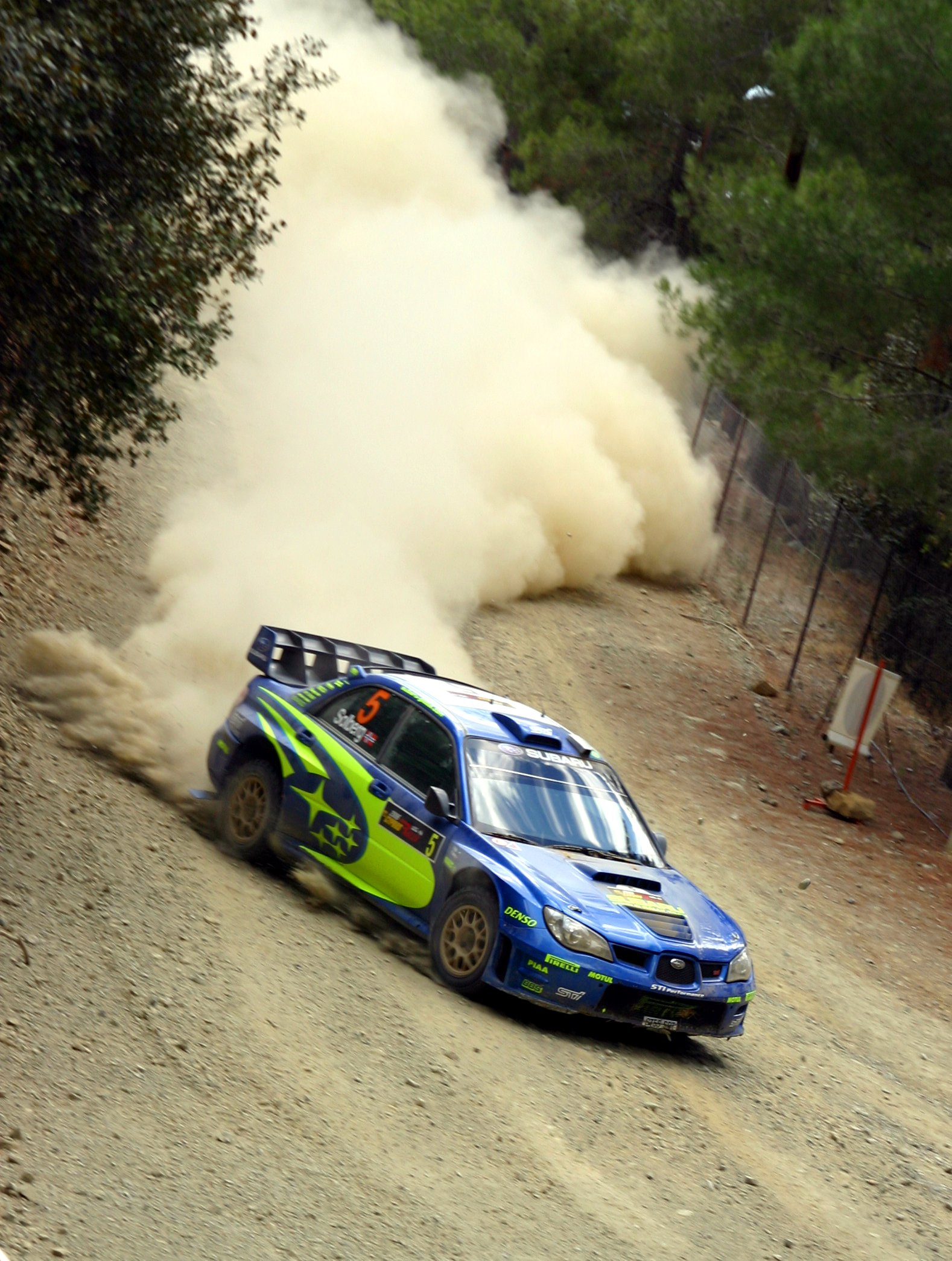
Petter Solberg driving a Subaru Impreza WRC on gravel at the 2006 Cyprus Rally, a World Rally Championship event

The WRC2001 featured an entirely new look, based on the GD chassis Impreza WRX. The new body had four doors (instead of two), and featured revised aerodynamics, improved weight distribution, and a lower centre of gravity. However, all the mechanical development from the previous year, including the engine, suspension, and drivetrain remained, with subtle refinements.

The WRC2002 was introduced at Corsica, and looked largely the same as the previous year's car. However, development of the car continued throughout the season. Improvements were made to the driveshaft, transmission housing, and steering column, as well as to the turbo-charger and manifold, which was changed from a 4–2–1 configuration to a 4–1 configuration. Savings found in modified brackets, wiring, and glass reduced weight by 15 kg (33 lb).

The WRC2003 was introduced at the 2003 Rallye Monte Carlo. It featured a revised look based on the updated Impreza production car introduced the previous year, with the "bugeye" headlamps replaced by the "blobeye" lamps. Technical improvements were made to the turbocharger and engine, aiming to increase torque at lower RPMs allowing greater driveability. The car's body shell was made both lighter and stiffer. Throughout the year modifications were made to the car's suspension.

The WRC2004 did not feature many cosmetic changes from the previous year's car, but did have refinements in the engine and body panels. It was introduced at Rally Mexico. A revised gearbox was introduced halfway through the season.

The WRC2005 was introduced following 12 months of joint development by Subaru and Prodrive, on 11 March 2005 at Rally Mexico. Its re-styled bodyshell was stiffer, and 30 mm wider to allow a wider track. The car featured more composite body panels, including front and rear wheel arches and bumpers in order to decrease weight. Engine enhancements included a lightened flywheel and revised IHI turbocharger. Revised water injection and fuel injection systems were also introduced.

The WRC2006 received the production car's second facelift with the "hawk eye" headlamps. It had several mechanical changes from the previous year's car due to rule changes which banned active differentials as well as water injection, as well as mandating that teams must re-use cars and engines on selected ‘pairs’ of events. Due to the rule changes, the car was introduced on the first round of the season.

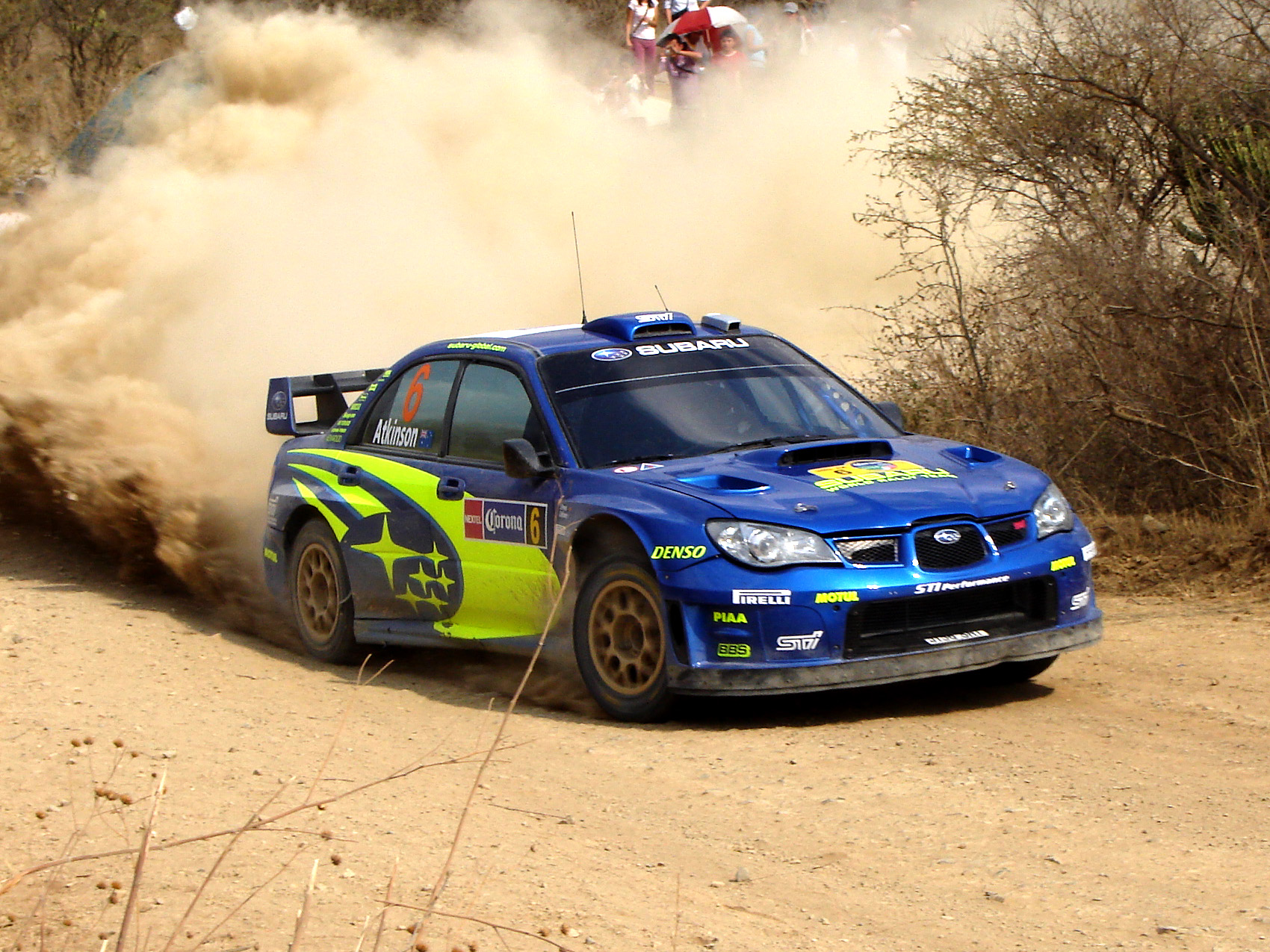
Chris Atkinson's WRC2007 at the 2008 Rally México.

The WRC2007, a revised version of the earlier year's car, was introduced at the fourth round of the championship, Rally México. It featured new dampers, a different radiator and intercooler arrangement, as well as improved weight distribution, suspension geometry and differential set-ups. It was considered to be underachieving compared to the newly introduced 2007 Focus WRC and the all-new Citroen C4 WRC. The car suffered from extensive handling problems, resulting in Subaru withdrawing from Rally Finland on the second day of the rally.

Each transmission in the WRC2007 takes 85 hours to build, and costs over £75,000. The front and rear differentials are similar while the centre differential is unique. Each takes around 16 hours to build and costs about £20,000. The cases for the transmission and differentials are constructed from magnesium to reduce weight. Filled with oil, the transmission weighs 95 kg, and a differential weighs 25 kg. The car's engine, transmission and differential are individually oil sealed, so that they can be removed and replaced without fluid loss. This also helps the team replace the components in 10–12 minutes. The transmission's lubrication system has a 4.5 litre capacity and includes an oil pump to help control differential temperatures, which usually operate around 100C. The transmission retains the roadgoing Impreza's H pattern but utilizes a hydraulically actuated and electronically controlled semi-automatic gearshift. The hydraulic gear shift system operates at a pressure of 17 MPa (2,500 psi), allowing gear shifts to be completed in less than 0.1 seconds.

=== World Rally Car Impreza GR, 2008 ===
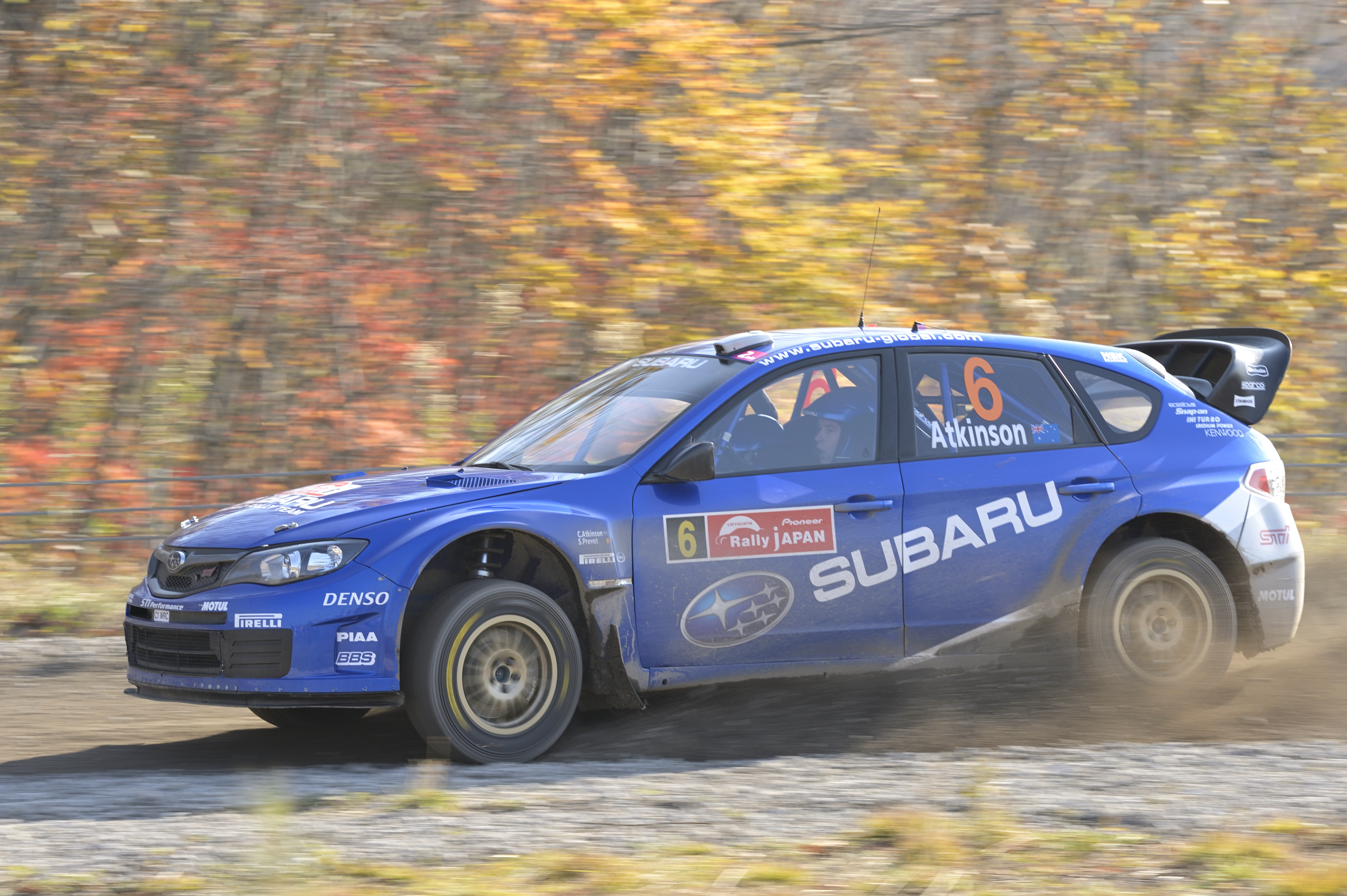
Chris Atkinson's Subaru Impreza WRC2008 at the 2008 Rally Japan

In December 2007, Subaru began testing the WRC2008, based on the all new GR chassis Impreza WRX. The 2008 car was expected to benefit from a decreased polar moment of inertia due to smaller overhangs, and also featured a double wishbone rear suspension. Prodrive deemed this configuration to be suboptimal and reverted the rear suspension to the original MacPherson design. An enhanced version of the 2007 car was utilized in the initial rallies, while preparations for the 2008 model were underway for competition. In 2008, Markko Märtin entered into an agreement to serve as the official test driver for the Subaru team, undertaking the majority of the testing for the WRC2008.

During a 4-day test at Sardinia between 30 April and 3 May 2008, Petter Solberg and Chris Atkinson drove the WRC2008 for the first time. A date for its debut was still not given. On 20 May 2008, the Subaru World Rally Team confirmed the WRC2008 would make its WRC debut at the Acropolis Rally of Greece, beginning on 29 May. On the car's rally debut, the WRC2008 scored its first podium finish with Petter Solberg placing 2nd in the Acropolis Rally.

Chris Atkinson's third place two rallies later at Rally Finland was the final WRC podium finish for the car and the Subaru World Rally Team, which withdrew from the championship at the end of 2008 during the 2008 financial crisis.

== First generation (VA; 2015) ==
First generation
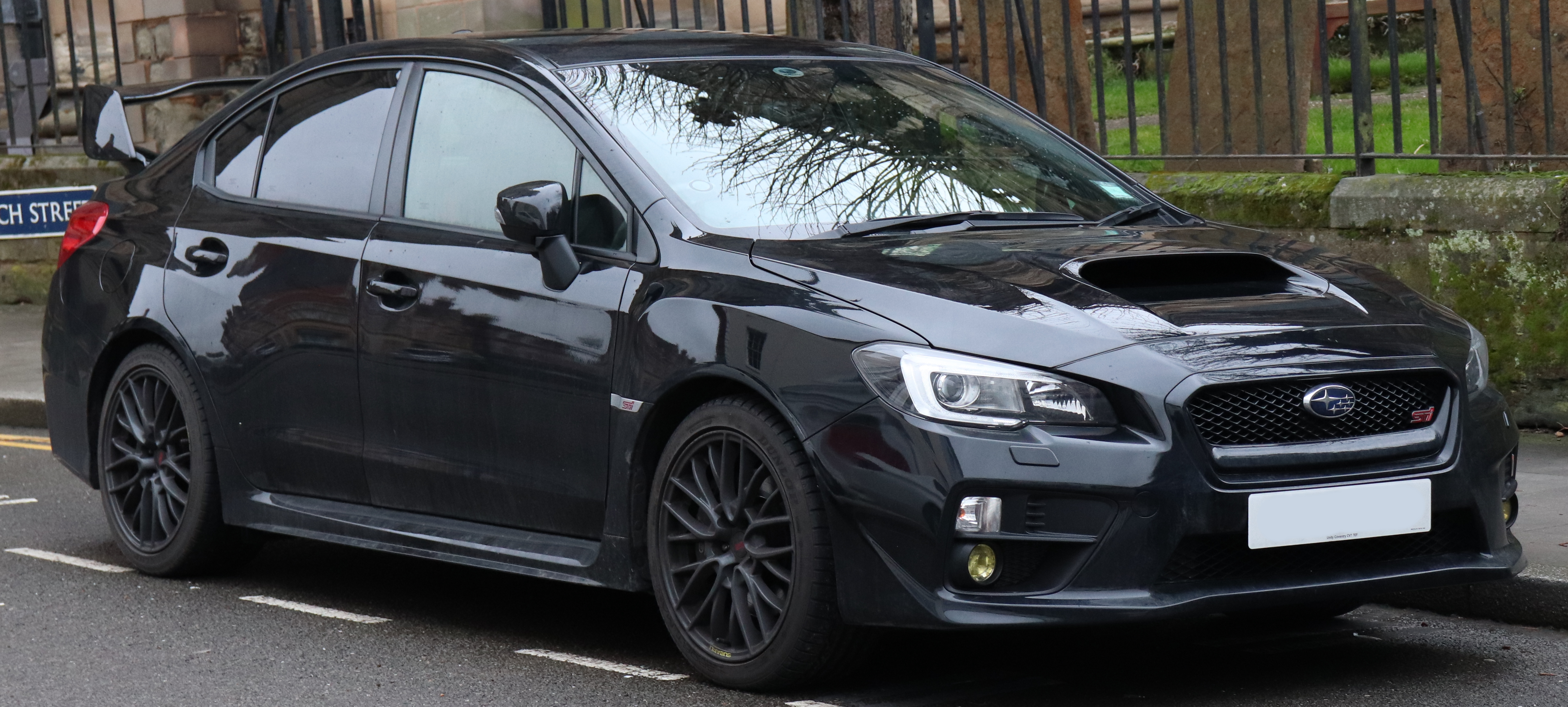
- Pre-facelift Subaru WRX STI (global model)

Overview
- Model code: VA
- Production: 2014–2021
- Model years: 2015–2021; 2015–2018 (United Kingdom)

Body and chassis
- Related: Subaru Impreza (GJ/GP); Subaru Levorg (VM); Subaru XV/Crosstrek (GP)

Powertrain
- Engine: Petrol: 2.0 L EJ207 H4-T (STI, Japan only); 2.0 L FA20F H4-T (WRX); 2.5 L EJ257 H4-T (STI, export)
- Transmission: 6-speed TY75 manual (WRX, export only); 6-speed TY85 manual (STI); Lineartronic TR690 CVT (WRX)

Dimensions
- Wheelbase: 2,650 mm (104.3 in)
- Length: 4,595–4,635 mm (180.9–182.5 in)
- Width: 1,795 mm (70.7 in)
- Height: 1,475 mm (58.1 in)
- Curb weight: 1,480–1,595 kg (3,262.8–3,516.4 lb)

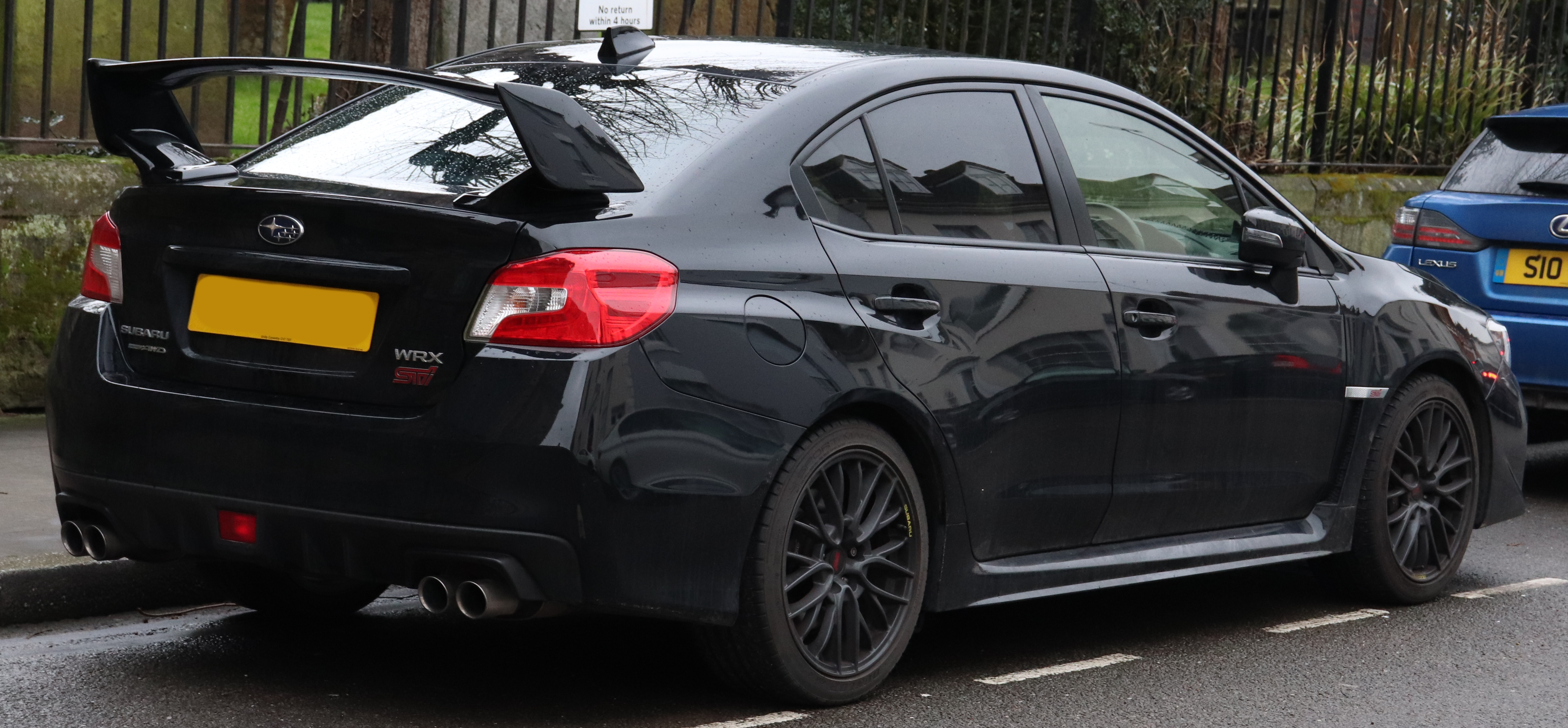
WRX STi (pre-facelift)

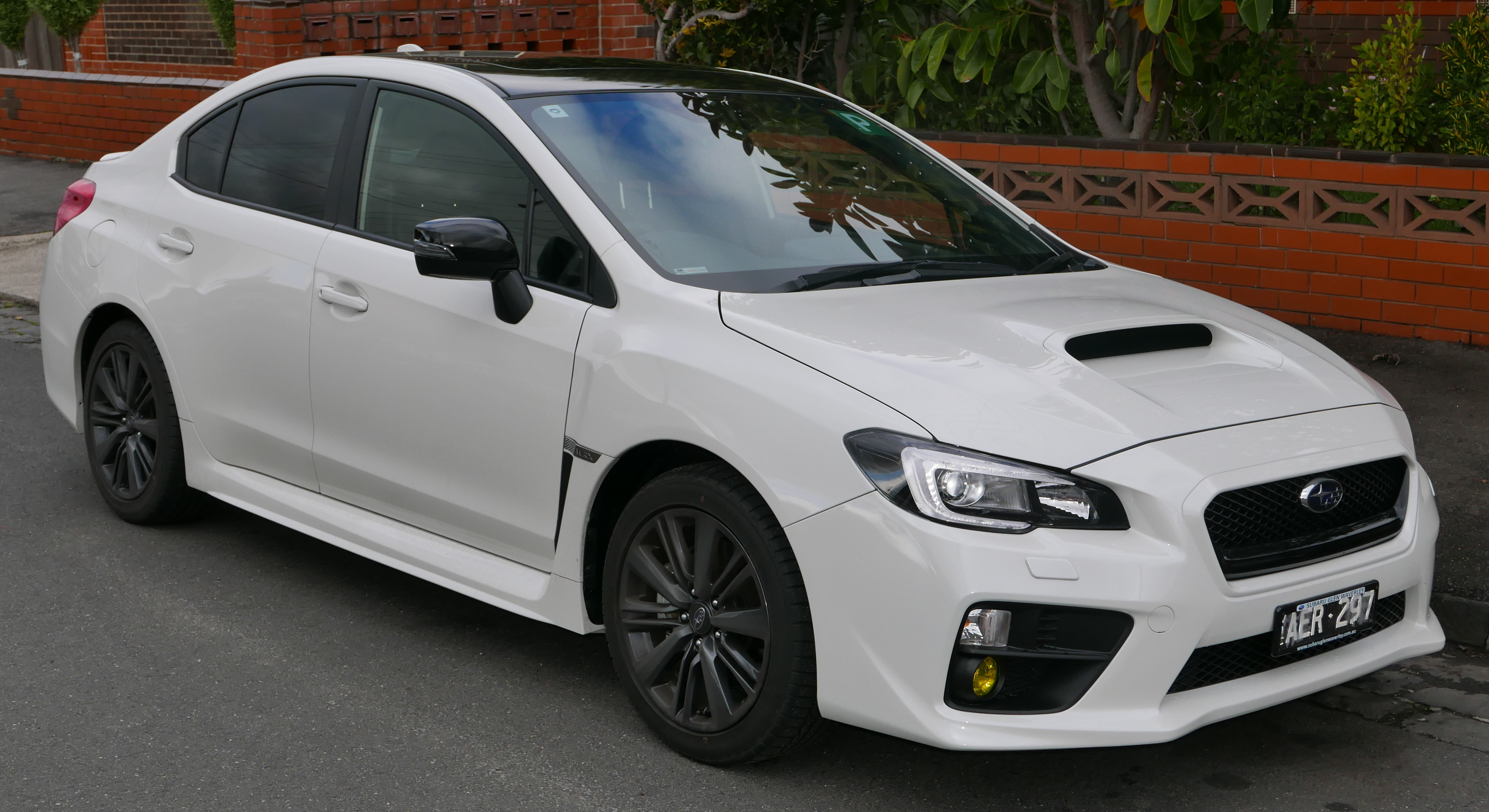

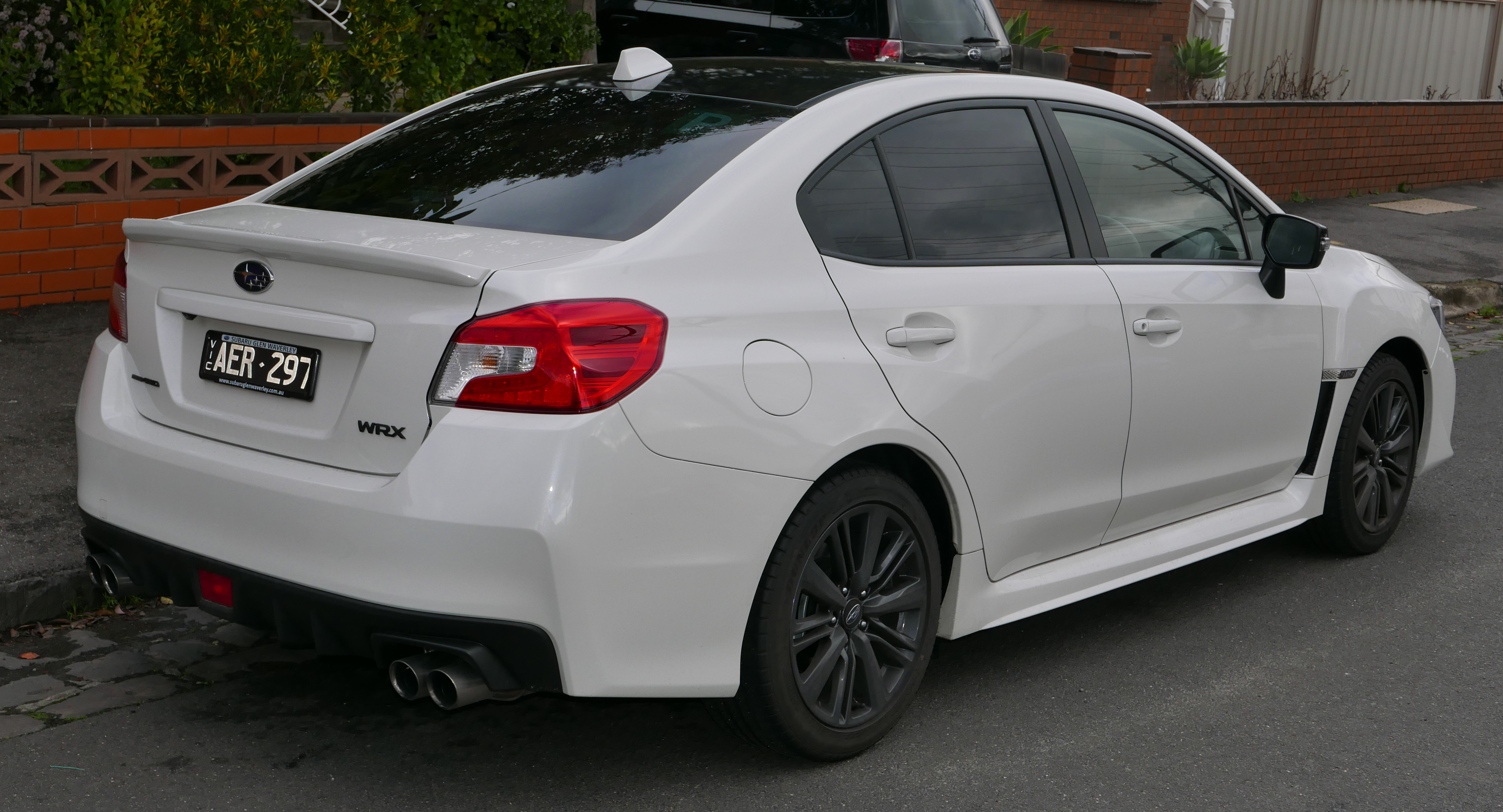
WRX (pre-facelift)

For the VA series WRX released in 2014 for the 2015 model year, Subaru decided to move away from marketing the WRX and WRX STI under the Impreza name. This time, the Impreza name was dropped in all markets in which the new model is named simply as the WRX, as had been the case in North America with the previous model, while in Japan it was sold as the WRX S4.

The WRX and WRX STI are the performance model based on the GJ Impreza with higher output engines, firmer suspension, larger brakes, slightly resculpted body panels, lowered ride height and larger intakes. The body design also took a stronger departure from the Impreza donor model than in the past. The general WRX profile/silhouette was carried over from the Impreza, as were the front doors, trunk lid, and interior. However, the entire front end bodywork plus the rear quarter panels were unique to the WRX. The rear doors received a subtle reskin with an upwards kink and revised character line, but retained an otherwise identical shape.

Subaru had promised to completely move the WRX and STI off the Impreza chassis and body to create a standalone model. The VA-body WRX is based on a modified Impreza body and chassis, with the Impreza name dropped from the WRX in all markets. For this generation, Subaru decided to not produce a WRX or WRX STI hatchback as had been previously offered. The previous generation hatchback made up approximately 50 percent of US WRX and WRX STI sales.

=== Powertrain ===
Subaru WRX (VA) engines
	Open engine compartment of a Subaru WRX, showing the horizontally-opposed "boxer" engine coded "FA20F"		Open engine compartment of a Subaru WRX STI for the Japanese market, showing the horizontally-opposed "boxer" engine coded "EJ207"	Open engine compartment of a Subaru WRX STI for the international (non-Japanese) market, showing the horizontally-opposed "boxer" engine coded "EJ257"
Engine	FA20F		EJ207	EJ257
Model	WRX	WRX S4 (JDM)	WRX STI (JDM)	WRX STI
Output	268 hp 200 kW @ 5600	296 hp 221 kW @ 5600	304 hp 227 kW @ 6400	305 hp 227 kW @ 6000
Output	258 lb⋅ft 350 N⋅m @2000–5200	300 lbf⋅ft 400 N⋅m @2000–4800	311 lbf⋅ft 422 N⋅m @4400	290 lb⋅ft 390 N⋅m @4000

This model is the first of the WRX line to deviate from the EJ-series engine. It uses the new 2.0-litre FA20F engine, which has direct injection and a twin-scroll turbocharger. On all previous WRXs, the turbocharger was located near the right-hand side of the firewall, close to the third cylinder. With the new FA20F engine, Subaru fitted the turbocharger at the front of the car, close to the serpentine accessory belts. There is a robust aluminum skid plate that protects the underside of the turbocharger. Mounting the turbo lower in the engine bay helps reduce the car's centre of gravity to 19.5 in (500 mm). The FA20's high compression ratio of 10.6:1 combined with its 68° intake and 54° exhaust cam phasing range allow it to produce excellent off-boost efficiency as well as a wide torque peak. A 6-speed TY75 manual transmission is standard on the WRX, up from 5-speeds. It is also available with a Lineartronic TR690 CVT with 6 or 8 simulated "gears" accessible through paddle shifters on the steering wheel. The Japanese-spec WRX S4 is only available with the CVT.

Behind the wheel, the most noticeable difference between the EJ and FA engines is the latter's broader torque curve. The 2.5-litre EJ produced a maximum of 240 lb⋅ft (325 N⋅m) at 4,000 rpm, while the new 2.0-litre FA peaks twice as soon (258 lb⋅ft (350 N⋅m) at 2,000 rpm). Less obvious is a 3 hp (2.2 kW) increase over the old engine; the FA is rated at 268 hp (200 kW) at 5,600 rpm for international models. The FA20F engine in the Japanese-spec WRX is rated at 295 hp [220 kW].

The WRX STI retains the EJ engine from the previous generation STI (2.0-litre EJ207 for Japanese models, 2.5-litre EJ257 for international models), with dual AVCS. However, it is equipped with modifications to the ECU which have increased fuel economy, and has given a slight boost in power. The EJ257 engine remains quoted at 305 hp (227 kW) but with 290 lb⋅ft (393 N⋅m) of torque, a slight drop from the previous generation however it is believed this is from the ECU reprogramming to support a stronger top end and true power output is believed to be circa 235-240 kW. The EJ207 makes 300 hp (224 kW) with 311 lb⋅ft (422 N⋅m) of torque. The WRX STI also retains the 6-speed TY85 manual transmission (the CVT is not available on the STI) from the previous generation.

There are also reports that along with the ECU changes, the rev limit was raised to 7,100 rpm to support the power increase at the upper rev range to support a stronger top end. It also retains the hydraulic power steering system as opposed to using the standard WRX's new electric-assisted rack. The steering rack was changed to a quicker 13:1 ratio, as used in the Japan delivered vehicles, as opposed to the 15:1 ratio of the previous models.

A sound tube device, also seen on the BRZ, has also been fitted to the air intake system to channel certain induction and turbo frequencies into the cabin, reports show this is only fitted to vehicles in some markets. In Europe, Australia, Canada and Japan, the STI is available with and without the wing. Starting in 2016, the US version of the limited STI was also made available with either the traditional high wing or, optionally, with the standard WRX low profile wing.

The third digit of the model code on a VA-era WRX designates the type of powertrain used. The possible digits are:

- G: WRX with the FA20F engine
- B: WRX STI with the EJ207 engine
- F: WRX STI with the EJ257 engine

=== Updates ===
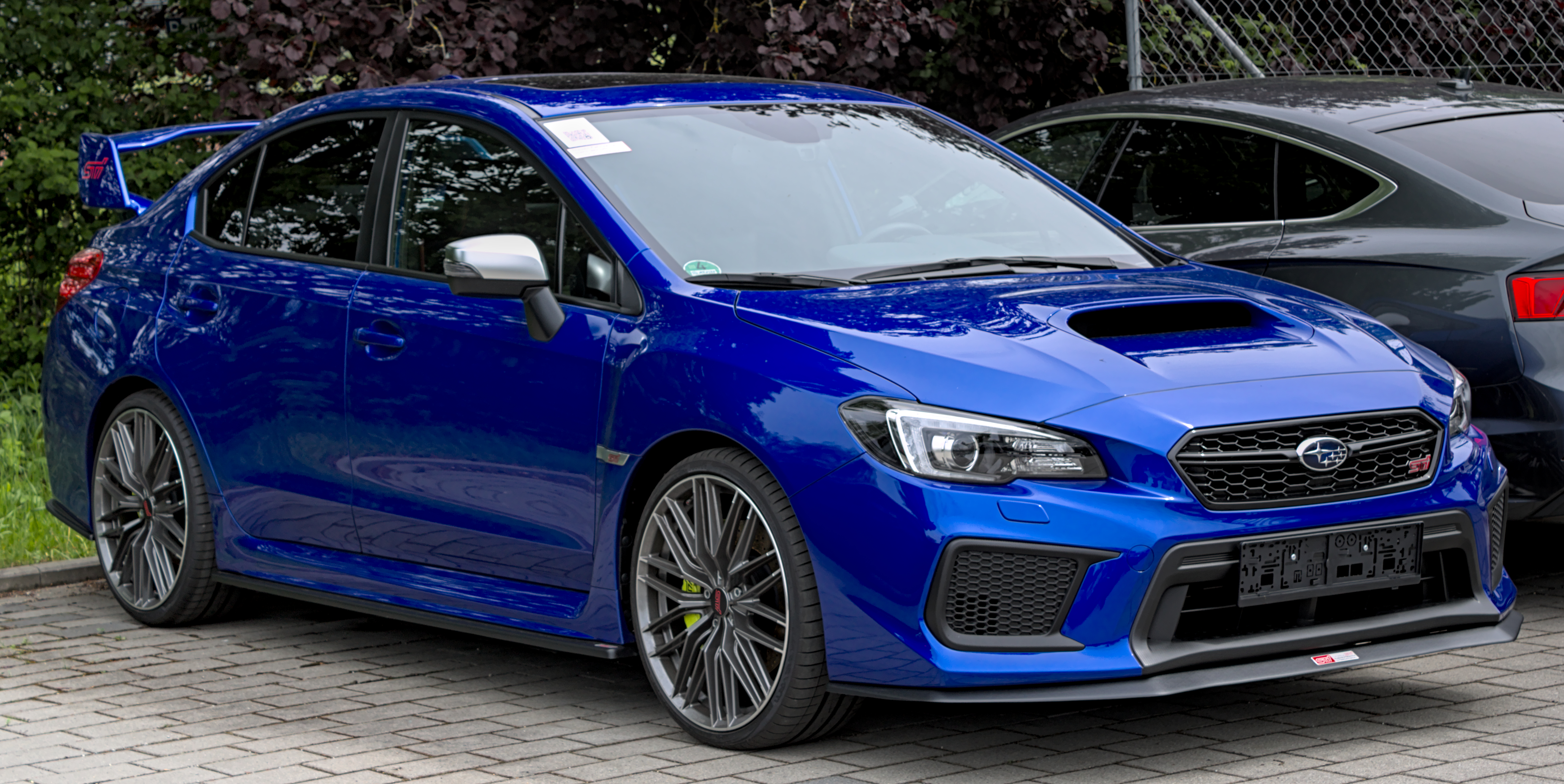

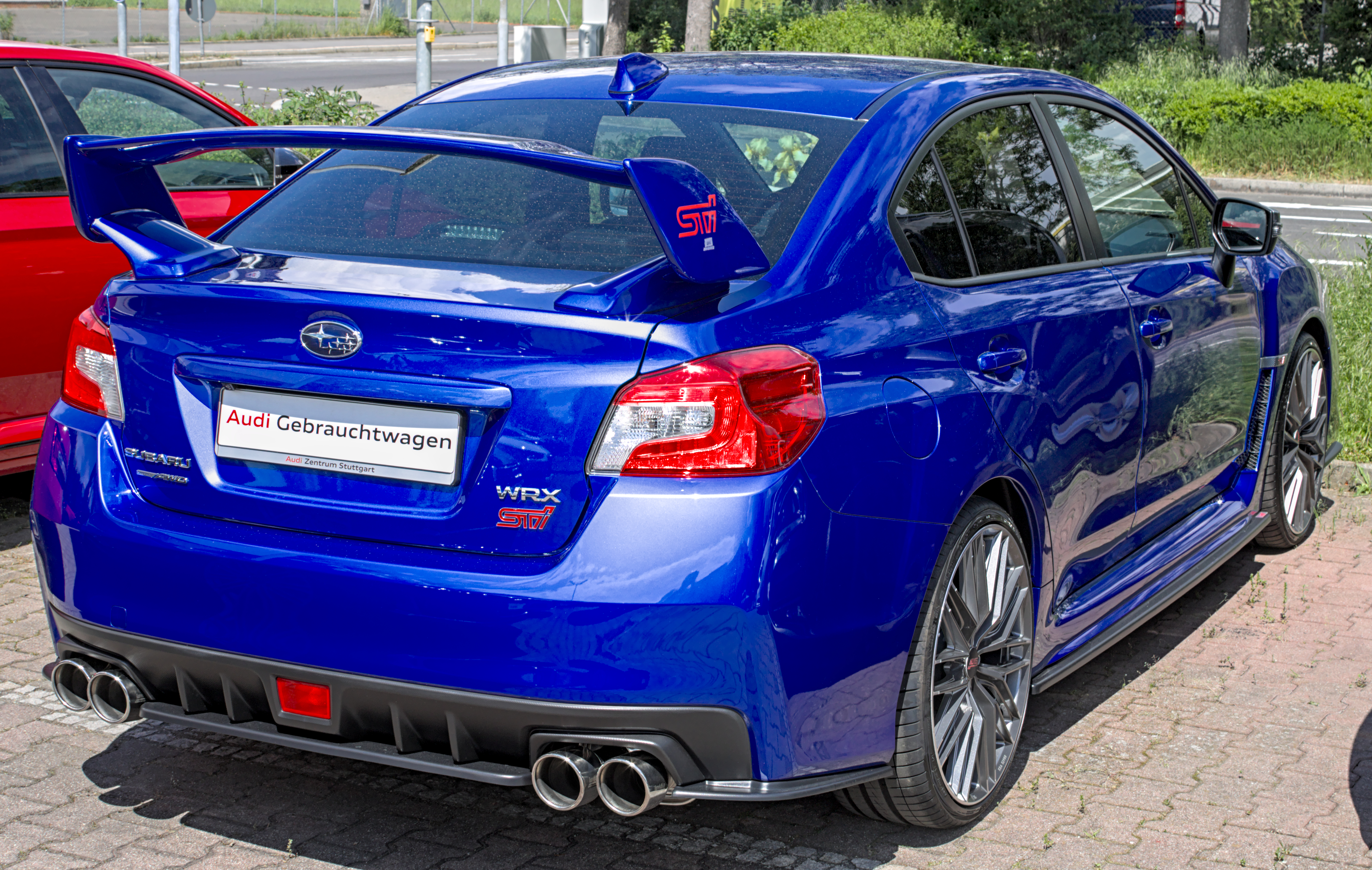
WRX STi (facelift)

In January 2017 for the North America market, Subaru announced several improvements that addressed some of the criticism of the 2015 model debut, including a newly revised suspension, revised, upgraded interior materials and a quieter cabin, and a revised front styling. For the WRX, a newly available performance Package option included Recaro front seats with 8-way power driver's seat, improved brake pads, and a moonroof delete to reduce weight. Also new was upgraded EyeSight Driver Assist Technology safety features.

For the 2018 model year, the WRX received some mid-generation improvements. The 2018 model first went on sale at dealerships in summer 2017. The 2018 WRX and WRX STI mid-model improvement continued with the 6-speed manual transmission came as standard equipment, and the optional Lineartronic CVT automatic transmission with Intelligent, Sport 6-speed paddle shift emulation and Sport# (pronounced "Sport Sharp") 8-speed paddle shift emulation. The standard WRX added heated exterior mirrors (already a standard on higher level trims). A new, larger 5.9-inch high-definition multi-function display replaced the older 4.3-inch unit allowing the driver to see vehicle functions more easily. The WRX Premium trim added a larger multimedia audio unit. WRX Limited models added an 8-way power driver's seat with lumbar adjustment.

In May 2018, the 2019 model year WRX and WRX STI was announced. The 2019 model first went on sale at dealerships in the summer of 2018.

The 2019 model introduced a new Subaru STARLINK infotainment system integrated standard with Apple CarPlay and Android Auto, as well as an optional Harman Kardon entertainment system and an optional larger infotainment screen size from 6.2 inches to 7.0 inches.

The 2019 WRX equipped with the optional Lineartronic CVT also came standard with the Subaru EyeSight driver assist technology. On previous models, Eyesight was only available as an option package. Also optional on the CVT equipped WRX was Reverse Automatic Braking, a feature unlikely to be implemented in non-CVT equipped vehicles.

Subaru's collision avoidance system, known as EyeSight, is only available on CVT models, along with reverse automatic braking. EyeSight was made standard on all CVT-equipped models starting with model year 2020. European sales of the WRX STI were ended in 2018.

=== Special editions ===
Subaru WRX STI (VA) S207/S208/S209
	Subaru WRX STI S207, a limited-production high-performance automobile. This is a front view of the car, showing its yellow color, hood scoop, and nameplate. Subaru WRX STI S207, a limited-production high-performance automobile. This is a rear view of the car, showing its yellow color, high trunk-mounted spoiler, and nameplate.	Subaru WRX STI S208, a limited-production high-performance automobile. This is a front view of the car, showing its blue color, hood scoop, and nameplate. Subaru WRX STI S208, a limited-production high-performance automobile. This is a rear view of the car, showing its blue color, high trunk-mounted spoiler, and nameplate.	Subaru WRX STI S209
Model	S207 (JDM)	S208 (JDM)	S209 (USDM)
Units	400	450	209
Engine	EJ207		EJ257
Output	323 hp 241 kW @7200	325 hp 242 kW @7200	341 hp 254 kW @6000
Output	318 lbf⋅ft 431 N⋅m @3200–4800	319 lbf⋅ft 432 N⋅m @3200–4800	330 lb⋅ft 450 N⋅m @4000

==== WRX STI Launch Edition ====
In 2015, Subaru released the WRX STI Launch Edition, with 1000 units being offered in North America. All 1,000 of these Launch Edition models were painted in World Rally Blue Pearl along with gold-painted 18-inch BBS forged alloy wheels. On to the interior, black stitching and blue leather accents were seen on the door cards as well as on the floormats and Alcantara-covered seats. All of the Launch Edition cars received a short throw shifter and keyless access with pushbutton start.

==== WRX STI S207 ====
In the same year, Subaru also released the WRX STI S207, limited to 400 units sold only for the Japanese market. The S207 used the 2 litre EJ20 engine which was tuned to 241 kW (328 PS; 323 hp) and 318 lb⋅ft (431 N⋅m) of torque. Upgrades also include a quicker-ratio 11-to-1 steering rack (compared to 13-to-1 for the stock unit). STI-spec Recaro front bucket seats, Bilstein adjustable DampMatic II front suspension, and drilled rotors clamped by Brembo monoblock six-piston front calipers and four-pot rear calipers. Up to 200 of the units could be equipped with the NBR Challenge Package, which features a carbon-fibre wing and a badge commemorating Subaru's class victory at the 2015 Nürburgring 24 Hours.

==== WRX STI Hyper Blue ====
In 2016, Subaru released the WRX STI Hyper Blue special edition series, with production limited to 700 units for the United States. The new color covers the outside, and it is also offset with gloss black 18-inch BBS wheels, badges and mirror caps. Blue stitching brings the color into the interior, and Subaru's seven-inch navigation system with a nine-speaker stereo is standard for this version. In Australia, Subaru announced the WRX Premium Hyper Blue special edition with the CVT automatic will be limited to 200 units targeted to customers, and WRX STI Premium with the six-speed gearbox will be limited to just 50 units. Canada was given 200 units named "Hikari" (Japanese for the word shine), with turnkey start, basic stereo non-GPS head unit and moon roof.

==== WRX STI S208 ====
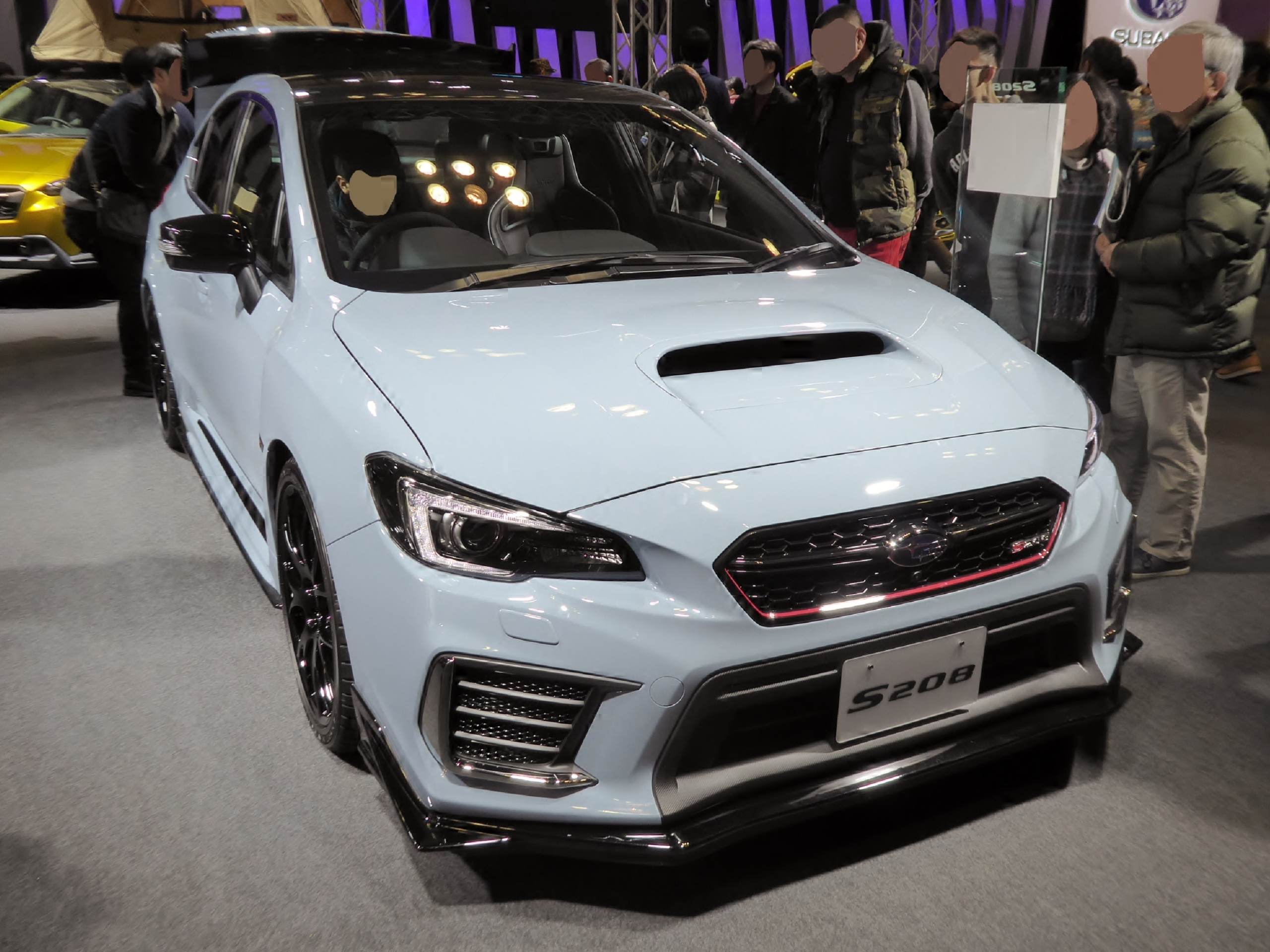
WRX STI S208 NBR Challenge Package

In 2017, Subaru released the WRX STI S208, limited to 450 units sold only for the Japanese market. The S208 used a 2.0-litre EJ20 engine tuned to 329 hp (245 kW) and 432 N⋅m (319 lbf⋅ft) of torque. It has other upgrades similar to those of the WRX STI S207- a quicker 11:1 ratio steering rack, Bilstein DampMatic II front suspension, Recaro front bucket seats, 19-inch BBS wheels, drilled rotors clamped by Brembo monoblock six-piston front calipers and four-pot rear calipers, intercooler water spray, a torque vectoring system, and more. Up to 350 units could be equipped with the NBR Challenge Package, which features a carbon fibre wing, front lip spoiler, and roof. The S208 was offered in 3 colors- WR Blue Pearl, Crystal White Pearl, and Cool Grey Khaki (only available with the NBR Challenge Package). Standard models cost ¥6,264,000 with tax and NBR Challenge Package-equipped models cost ¥6,890,400 ($63,229) with the carbon fibre lip spoiler or ¥7,106,400 with the carbon fibre rear wing.

==== WRX STI Diamond Edition ====
As a way of celebrating 30 years of the STI nameplate (in 2018), Subaru offered a limited-edition WRX STI Diamond Edition which was developed by Subaru Southern Africa's technical team, making it exclusively available to the region with only 30 being produced. The WRX STI Diamond Edition is powered by a 2.5-litre, high-boost turbocharged Boxer engine that offers 260 kW (350 hp) at 4,500 rpm and 464 N⋅m (342 lb⋅ft) of torque at 4,000 rpm. The remapping of the electronic control unit and the fitment of a performance exhaust system has contributed to improved performance. A new engine brace has been fitted for better stability and balance. The WRX STI Diamond Edition rides 20 mm lower than the standard WRX STI and the body kit, in a High Viz yellow, further lowers the front end by 10 mm. The spoiler vane gets a stainless steel STI badge unique to this limited-edition model and high-gloss black Diamond Edition badges appear on the sides of the rear wing. The WRX STI Diamond Edition rides on 19-inch lightweight and darkened aluminum Y-design alloy wheels.

WRX 50th Anniversary Edition

For Subaru's 50th anniversary in 2018, the WRX, along with each other model Subaru made, received a limited-edition version featuring a top-trimmed vehicle with exclusive heritage blue coloring, a satin chrome stylization, and 50th anniversary accents. These accents include badging on the side of the vehicle, silver themed interior featuring silver stitching and silver seatbelts, and Recaro seats with an embroidered celebratory 50th anniversary symbol, along with matching floor mats. Production was limited to 1,050 units for the Crosstrek, Forester, Impreza, Legacy and Outback, along with the BRZ getting 250, while the WRX received 600 units, and the STI received 200, for a total of 6300 cars.

==== WRX STI Type RA ====
For the 2018 model year, Subaru of America introduced the WRX STI Type RA to celebrate the successful record attempt at becoming the fastest saloon around the Nürburgring. This numbered limited edition was limited to 500 examples for the United States and 75 examples for Canada. The Type RA featured 19" gold-colored forged wheels, carbon roof and spoiler, among other changes. The car also featured a carbon fibre roof and rear wing. It was available in a choice of three colors: World Rally Blue Pearl, Black and White.

Upgraded pistons were used, increasing horsepower by 5 to 310 hp (4 to 231 kW), and were also added on all model year 2019 STI models.

==== WRX STI RA-R ====
For the model year 2018, but available only in Japan, Subaru debuted the RA-R, which stands for "Record Attempt-Racing," a nod to previous, track-based STI variants. Meanwhile, Subaru Tecnica International helped the vehicle shave 22 lb (10 kg), bringing the weight down to 3,263 lb (1,480 kg) while reinforcing the chassis and putting on bigger brakes while adding some aerodynamic elements. The RA-R uses a turbocharged 2.0 flat-four (H4) engine from the S208, which has an output of 324 hp (242 kW; 328 PS) at 7200 rpm and 319 lb⋅ft (433 N⋅m) of torque in the range of 3200–4800 rpm. A new muffler gives the car an improved gas flow by approximately 60% and a throatier exhaust note.

==== WRX Raiu Edition ====
In 2018, Subaru launched the 2019 WRX Raiu edition for the Canadian market, the first limited edition Subaru sold in Canada in 15 years. This model is similar to the Series. Gray edition sold in the US, with its name derived from the Japanese word for thunderstorm. This model was not available with a CVT, buyers could only get a 6-speed manual transmission. The Raiu Edition got upgrades like an STI-branded front lip, side sill, and rear side spoilers, along with a unique short-throw shifter. Black interior and exterior accents were added, with gunmetal finish 18" alloy wheels and Cool Grey Khaki paint also being the only wheel/color options. Jurid front brakes and red-painted calipers were also standard. The Raiu Edition also got the Sport-tech RS trim's existing features, including Recaro front seats with "Ultrasuede," a seven-inch touchscreen "Starlink" multimedia system, and a nine-speaker Harman Kardon stereo system. Only 100 units of the Raiu Edition were made available, with a price point of $40,995 CAD.

==== WRX Series.Gray ====
For the 2019 model year, the WRX Series.Gray was made available in the United States with production limited to 750 units. The exterior color was Cool Gray Khaki, featuring exclusive black finish WRX 18-inch alloy wheels, Crystal Black Silica badging and foldable exterior mirrors. Other performance upgrades included Jurid high performance front brake pads and a moonroof delete to save weight. The interior front seats were upgraded to Ultrasuede covered Recaro seats with an 8-way power feature for the driver. An STI version was also sold with 250 made. Both models also got upgraded suspension and brakes.

==== WRX STI TC380 ====
Subaru announced yet another limited-run model of the WRX STI trim for 2018. The TC380 is available only in Japan and one of their most powerful models to date with an output of 380 hp (280 kW; 390 PS). Modifications to each car are overseen by Japanese rally driver Toshihiro Arai, who competed in the World Rally Championship with Subaru. The improvements include a suite of HKS parts, including a GT III RS Sport turbo kit, Sport Turbo resonator and a high-flow catalytic converter. Arai Motorsports will install the HKS parts while adding components of its own, including an RQA air filter and an in-house front chassis brace to help with frame rigidity. A carbon fibre rear lip spoiler aids grip at insanely high speeds and serial-numbered Recaro bucket seats explicitly designed for the TC380 will hold the driver down inside. Overall the automaker plans to manufacture only 50 of the WRX STI TC380. The car will continue production until all 50 units are exhausted, joining a series of other limited edition WRX variants such as the Japanese RA-R, United States Seres.Gray and Canadian Raiu Editions.

==== WRX STI S209 ====
For the 2019 model year, a special edition WRX STI S209 was made available, being the first S series STI sold in the US, and the third S series based on the VA series platform, following the S207 and S208. The S209 is the most expensive Subaru ever at US$64,000, and is only sold in the US with 209 being built. It is also the most powerful, with 341 hp (254 kW) and 330 lb⋅ft (450 N⋅m) of torque out of a modified EJ257. Canards are added to the front, and the STI Type RA's carbon roof and wing are retained. The suspension is improved and derived from other S series cars, along with Subaru's Nürburgring race car. The car is available in WR Blue with grey wheels and Crystal White with gold wheels. The S209 is also transported from the Gunma, Japan plant to Subaru's Kiryu-Kougo subsidiary to be finished since the S209 does not meet the standards for cars manufactured in Gunma. The car is sold under the STI brand rather than the Subaru brand, which has caused difficulties importing the car into the US.

==== WRX Series.White ====
For the 2020 model year, the WRX Series.White was made available, with 500 units built, along with 500 STI models being made. Suspension and braking upgrades were included, along with cosmetic upgrades like bronze wheels and black accents. The car is only available in a special ceramic white.

==== WRX STI Kanrai Edition ====
Again for the 2020 model year, but only available to the Canadian market, is the WRX STI Kanrai Edition. Only 75 units were available to the Canadian market compared to the Raiu Edition's 100 units. The WRX STI Kanrai Edition was built on the WRX STI Sport-Tech foundation. Kanrai, which translates to "winter thunder," sports an exclusive Ceramic White exterior paint along with the aggressive characteristics found in the WRX STI. Outfitted on this WRX STI is STI-tuned Bilstein performance suspension, lightweight 19" BBS forged alloy bronze-painted wheels paired with Michelin Pilot Sport Cup 2 tires, which deliver significant handling dynamics and grip. The standard Brembo 6-pot front and 2-pot rear brake system with cross-drilled rotors and silver painted calipers. Subaru removed the spare tire and replaced it with a repair kit to help this STI shave some pounds. The Kanrai incorporates a black low-profile lip spoiler, black badging, mirror caps, and shark fin antenna to complement the Ceramic White paint. What makes it pop is the black front grille receives the STI's unique cherry colour.

==== WRX STI EJ20 Final Edition ====
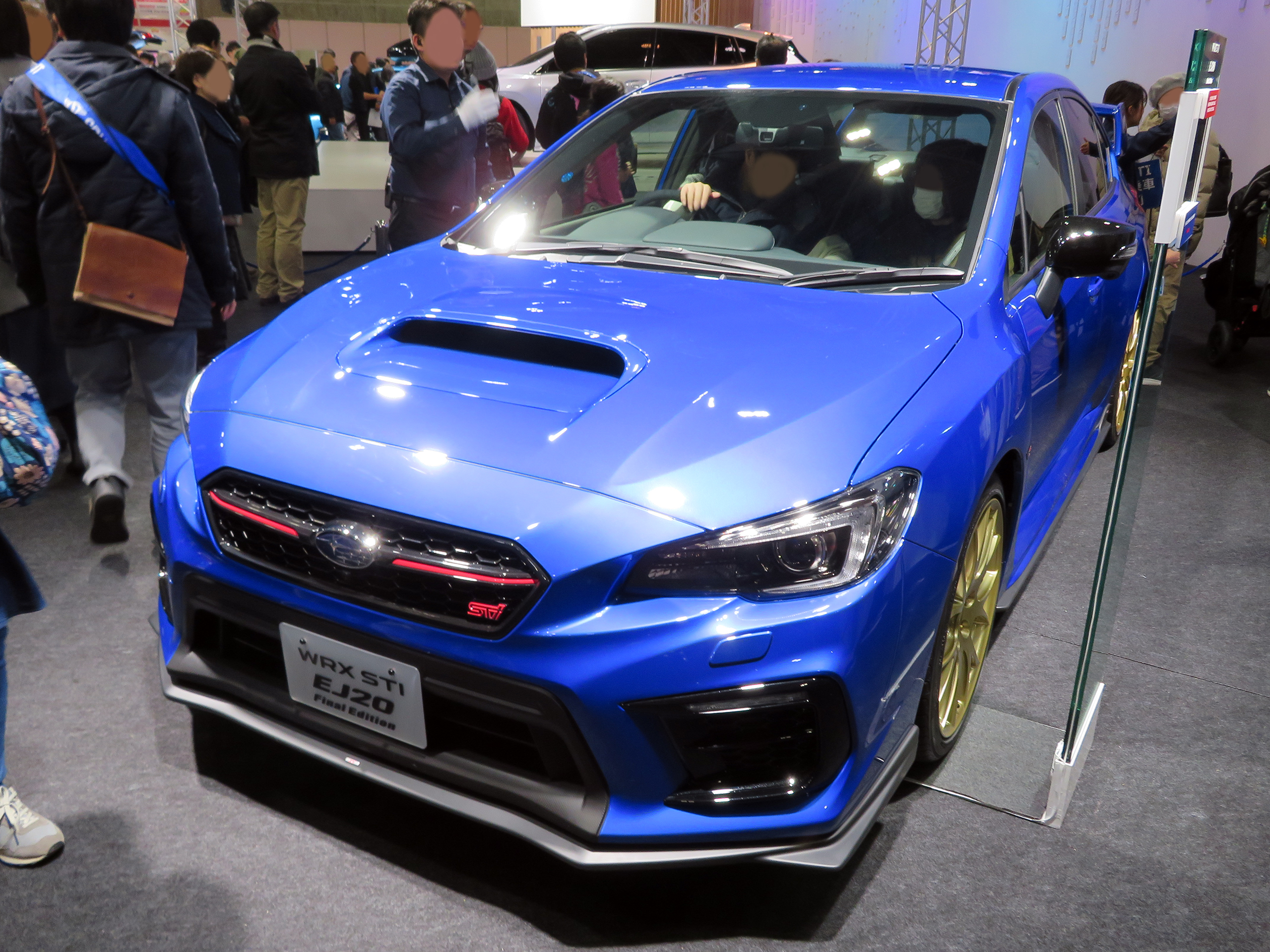
WRX STI EJ20 Final Edition

A limited EJ20 Final Edition was made available in Japan in late 2019 to commemorate the end of production of the EJ20 engine. With only 555 units produced, the limited edition has a balanced version of the EJ20 engine, according to Subaru the pistons and connecting rods have a 50 percent reduction in weight differences, crankshafts have an 85 percent lower tolerance in rotational balance, flywheels and clutch covers have a 50 percent reduction in rotational balance tolerances, precision close to that of a racing engine.

=== Reception ===
The 2015 WRX was met with mixed reviews by automotive journalists. It placed second to the 2015 Volkswagen GTI in separate comparison tests in the September 2014 issues of Car and Driver and Motor Trend. In general, it bested its sub-$30,000 competition in nearly every performance metric, but suffered from a cheaper interior and a less comfortable ride. Its styling is usually listed as polarizing, too, although the bulk of criticism in that area was based on the lack of a hatchback model.

Performance numbers vary from publication to publication. Testing from Car and Driver, Road & Track and Motor Trend produced 0–60 mph (97 km/h) times as fast as 4.8 seconds and as slow as 5.5 seconds. It runs the quarter-mile anywhere from 13.6 sec at 102 mph (164 km/h) to 14.0 sec at 98 mph (158 km/h). (CVT-equipped WRXs are about a half-second slower to 60 mph and through the quarter-mile.) On the skidpad, roadholding numbers range from 0.92 G to 0.96 G. Braking from 70 mph (113 km/h) results in stops as short as 156–166 feet.

=== Issues ===
WRX models from the 2015 through the 2019 model year suffer from rev hang, though rev hang was reduced for the 2020 model year. WRX STI models still suffer from past issues with the EJ257 engine, like piston ring and rod bearing failure under certain conditions.

=== Safety ===
ANCAP test results* Subaru WRX (2014)
Test	Score
Overall	5 /5 stars
Frontal offset	14.86/16
Side impact	16/16
Pole	2/2
Seat belt reminders	3/3
Whiplash protection	Good
Pedestrian protection	Good
Electronic stability control	Standard

== Second generation (VB; 2021) ==
Second generation
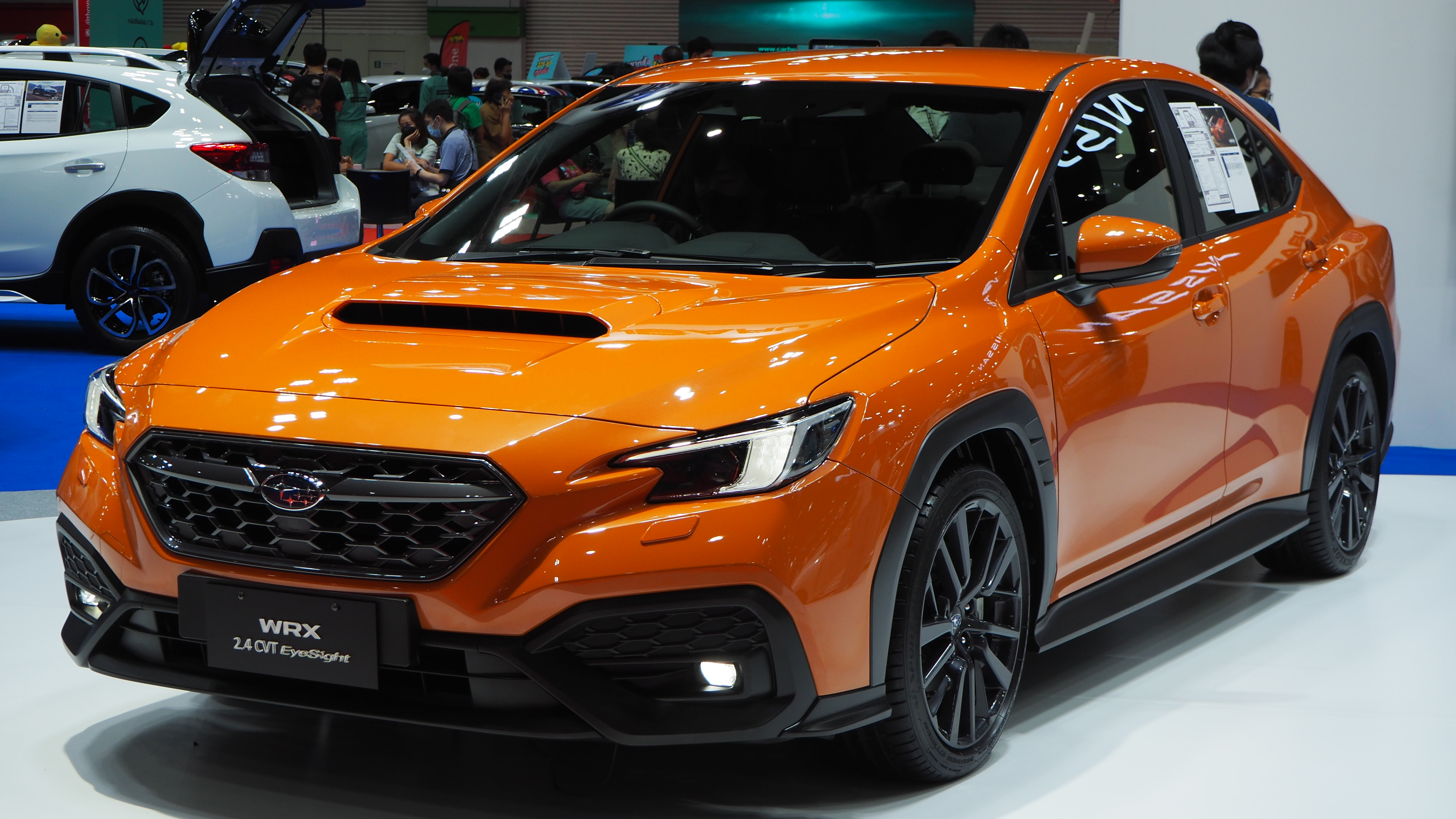
- 2022 Subaru WRX 2.4 EyeSight

Overview
- Model code: VB
- Production: 2021–present
- Model years: 2022–present

Body and chassis
- Platform: Subaru Global Platform
- Related: Subaru Impreza (GK/GT); Subaru Levorg/WRX wagon/WRX Sportswagon/WRX GT (VN); Subaru XV/Crosstrek (GT)

Powertrain
- Engine: Petrol: 2.4 L FA24F turbo H4
- Transmission: 6-speed manual; Subaru Performance CVT

Dimensions
- Wheelbase: 2,671 mm (105.2 in)
- Length: 4,669 mm (183.8 in)
- Width: 1,826 mm (71.9 in)
- Height: 1,468 mm (57.8 in)
- Curb weight: 1,510–1,600 kg (3,329–3,527 lb)

The second-generation WRX was previewed by a series of concept cars branded as VIZIV Performance Concept as early as 2017. The production WRX was redesigned for the 2022 model year and moved to the Subaru Global Platform. Subaru was set to debut the all-new 2022 WRX on 19 August 2021, at the 2021 New York International Auto Show. However, due to the auto show being canceled, the unveiling was rescheduled for 10 September.

In March 2022, Subaru announced they would not market the expected second-generation WRX STI high-performance model with an internal-combustion engine. Dominick Infante of Subaru stated "[A new WRX STI] would have a very limited shelf life ... The [emissions] regulations are changing so quickly that it kind of wouldn't make any sense." The WRX generation after VB may include a WRX STI, but that future WRX STI is likely to include a hybrid or battery-electric drivetrain.

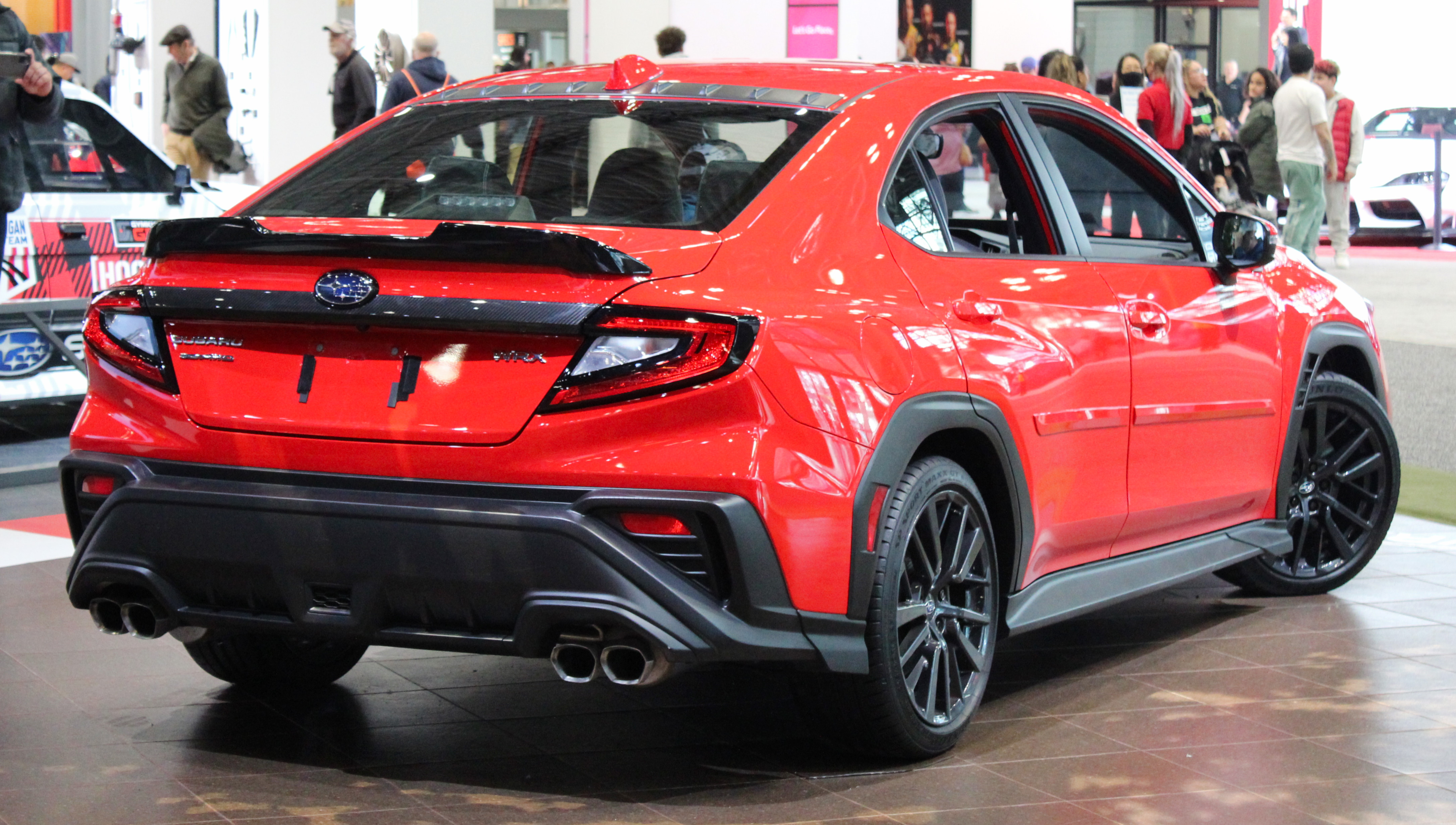
Rear view (with optional rear lip)

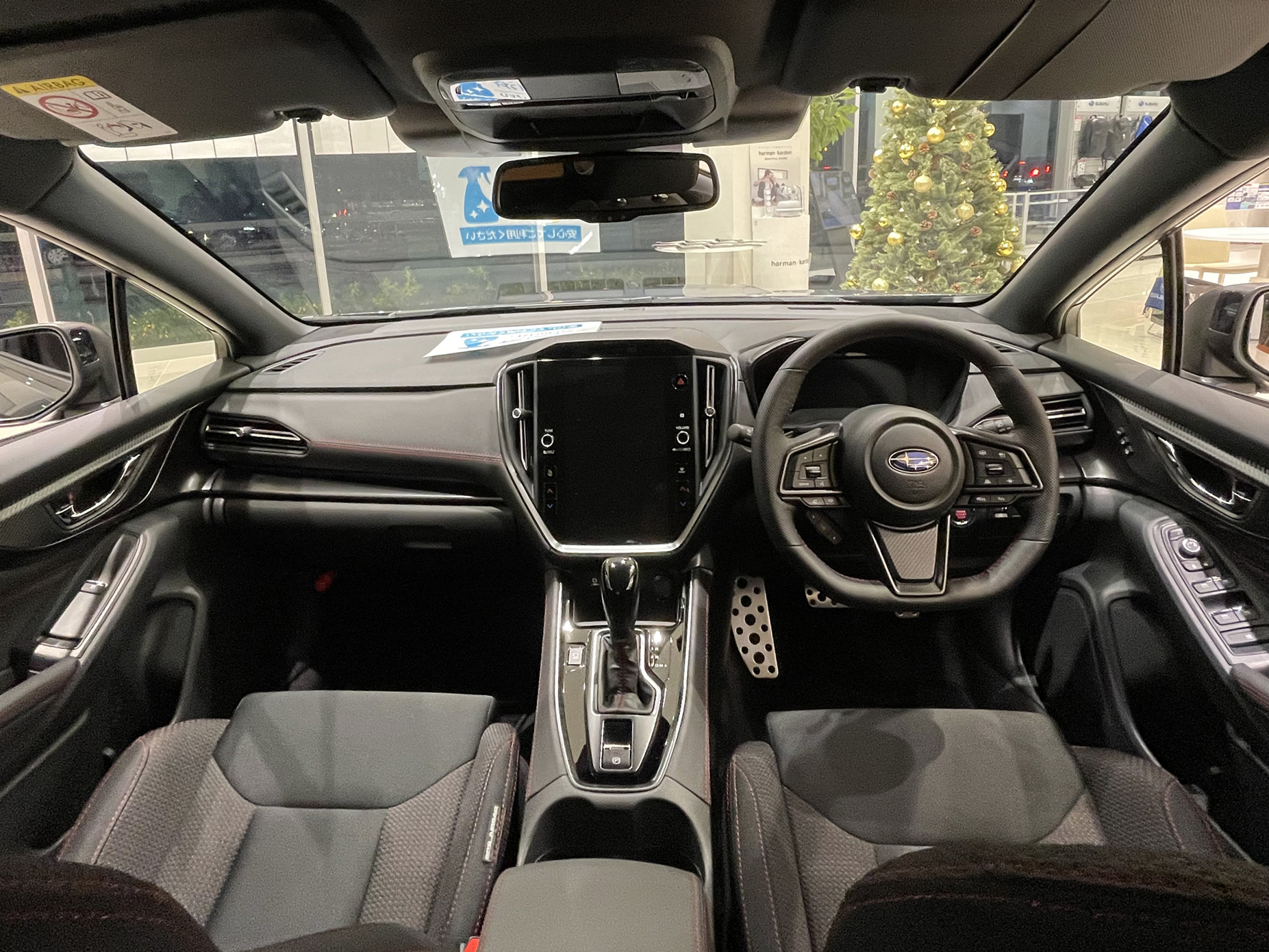
Interior

=== North America ===
On September 10th 2021, the new second-generation standalone Subaru WRX (fifth generation for the WRX nameplate) was revealed for the North American market. It features a new FA24F 2.4-litre turbocharged horizontally opposed four-cylinder boxer engine that produces 271 horsepower (202 kW; 275 PS) and 258 lb⋅ft (350 N⋅m; 36 kg⋅m) of torque. Engine updates include a larger cylinder bore, an electronically controlled wastegate, and air bypass valves. Transmission choices are either a new CVT called the Subaru Performance Transmission (SPT) or a revised version of the six-speed manual. The SPT offers a planetary centre gear with variable torque distribution, while the manual transmission is equipped with a viscous centre differential and a 50-50 torque split. Both SPT and 6MT versions have open differentials front and rear and torque vectoring by brake. When equipped with the "Drive Mode Select System", the car is equipped with electronically controlled adaptive dampers, which is a first for the WRX.

The WRX was released in the North American market in February 2022. In the U.S., it comes in Base, Premium, Limited and GT. In Canada, it comes in Base, Sport and Sport-tech, the two upper trims can be optioned with the EyeSight system.

==== Model year changes ====
2023: There were no major changes apart from minor improvements to features.

2024: The introduction of a TR model. The EyeSight system and wireless connectivity for both Android Auto and Apple CarPlay became standard on all trim levels. Mechanically, all trims now get a larger master brake cylinder and the crash structure for the rear occupants is improved.

2025: The TR is replaced by tS model (Tuned by STI) features an upgraded Brembo brake system, Drive Mode Select, electronically controlled dampers, gold-painted calipers and the power output remain unchanged. Additionally, the base model was discontinued.

2026: The base model returns. A new Series.Yellow model is introduced, limited to 350 units.

=== Japan ===
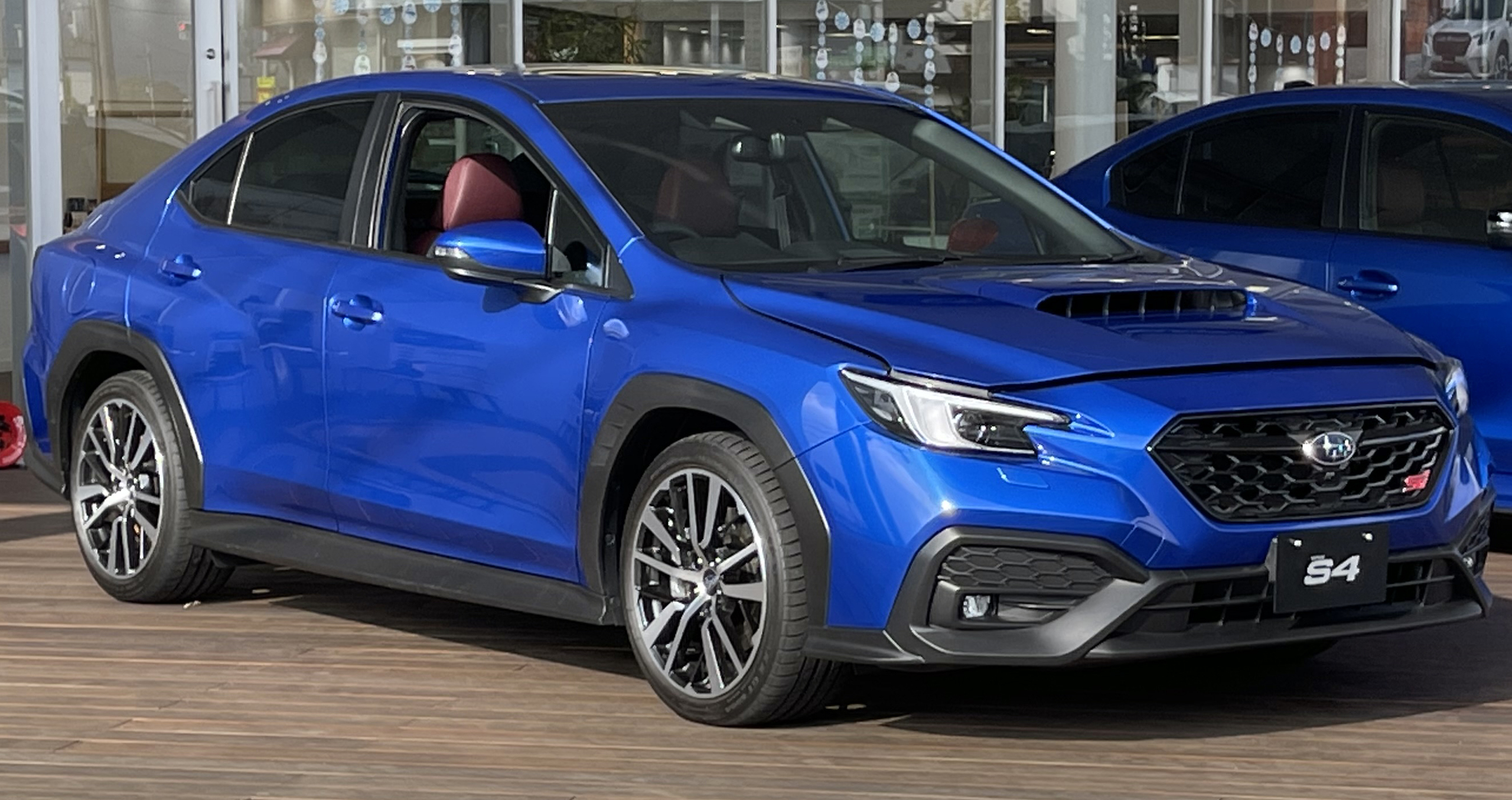
WRX S4 STI Sport R EX

The second-generation WRX S4 for the Japanese market made its debut on 25 November 2021. Like the other regions, the WRX S4 is equipped with the FA24 2.4L direct-injection turbo boxer, tuned to produce 202 kW (275 PS; 271 hp) at 5,600 rpm and 375 N⋅m (277 lb⋅ft; 38 kg⋅m) between 2,000 and 4,800 rpm, coupled with the continuously-variable "Subaru Performance Transmission", providing an estimated fuel consumption of 10.8 km/L (31 mpg_{‑imp}; 25 mpg_{‑US}).

Initially, it was available in two models: GT-H and STI Sport R. Within those models, an optional "EX" grade is available for an additional ¥385,000 that adds the Subaru "EyeSight X" advanced driver-assistance system. The instrument panel of the "EX" grades use a 12.3-inch (31 cm) LCD, while the conventional grades use two analog instruments with a small 4.2-inch (11 cm) central display. A 9-inch (23 cm) LCD for navigation is optional for the non-EX grades, while EX grades receive a portrait orientation 11.6-inch (29 cm) LCD in the centre console for additional controls and displays. Compared to the GT-H, the STI Sport R model upgrades include electronically controlled dampers.

In January 2022, Subaru and STI jointly exhibited several concept models, including the WRX S4 STI Performance, which mainly includes cosmetic upgrades, and the world premiere of the STI E-RA Concept, billed as a carbon-neutral car.

The 6-speed manual transmission model was officially announced as the STI Sport R, marking the return of the manual transmission after approximately 7 years in Japan. Sales began on 19 November the same year.

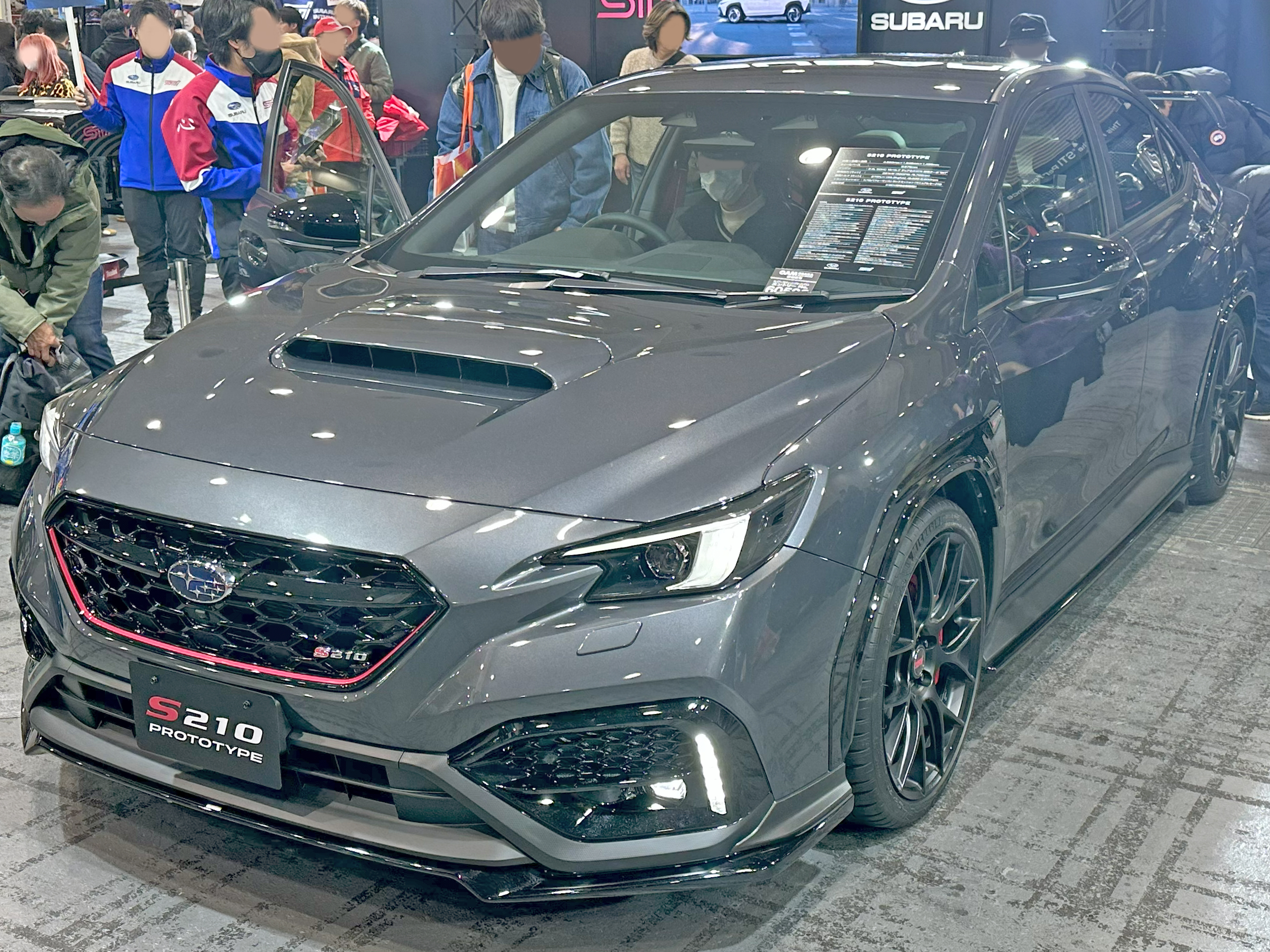
WRX S210 prototype front view

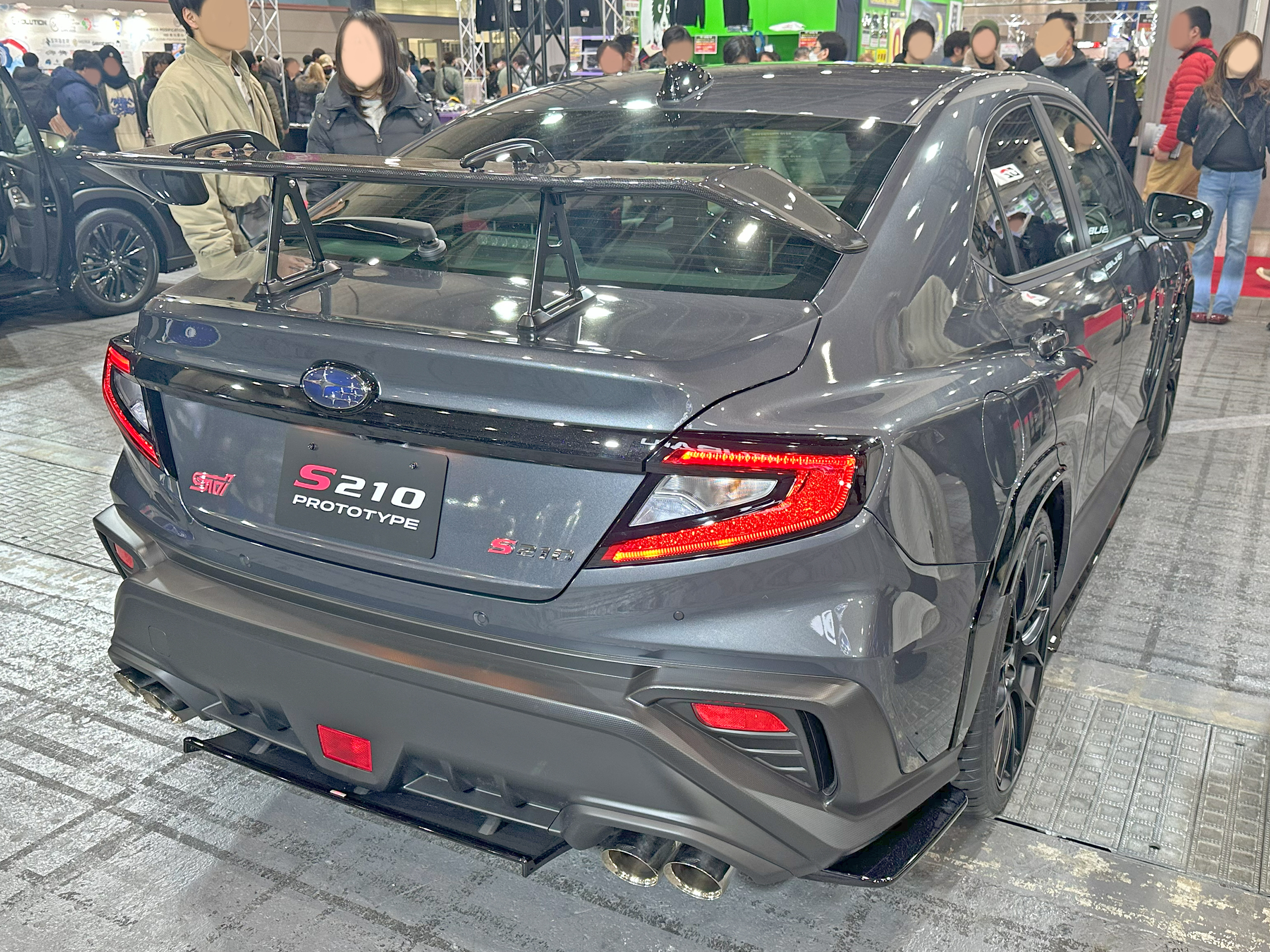
WRX S210 prototype rear view

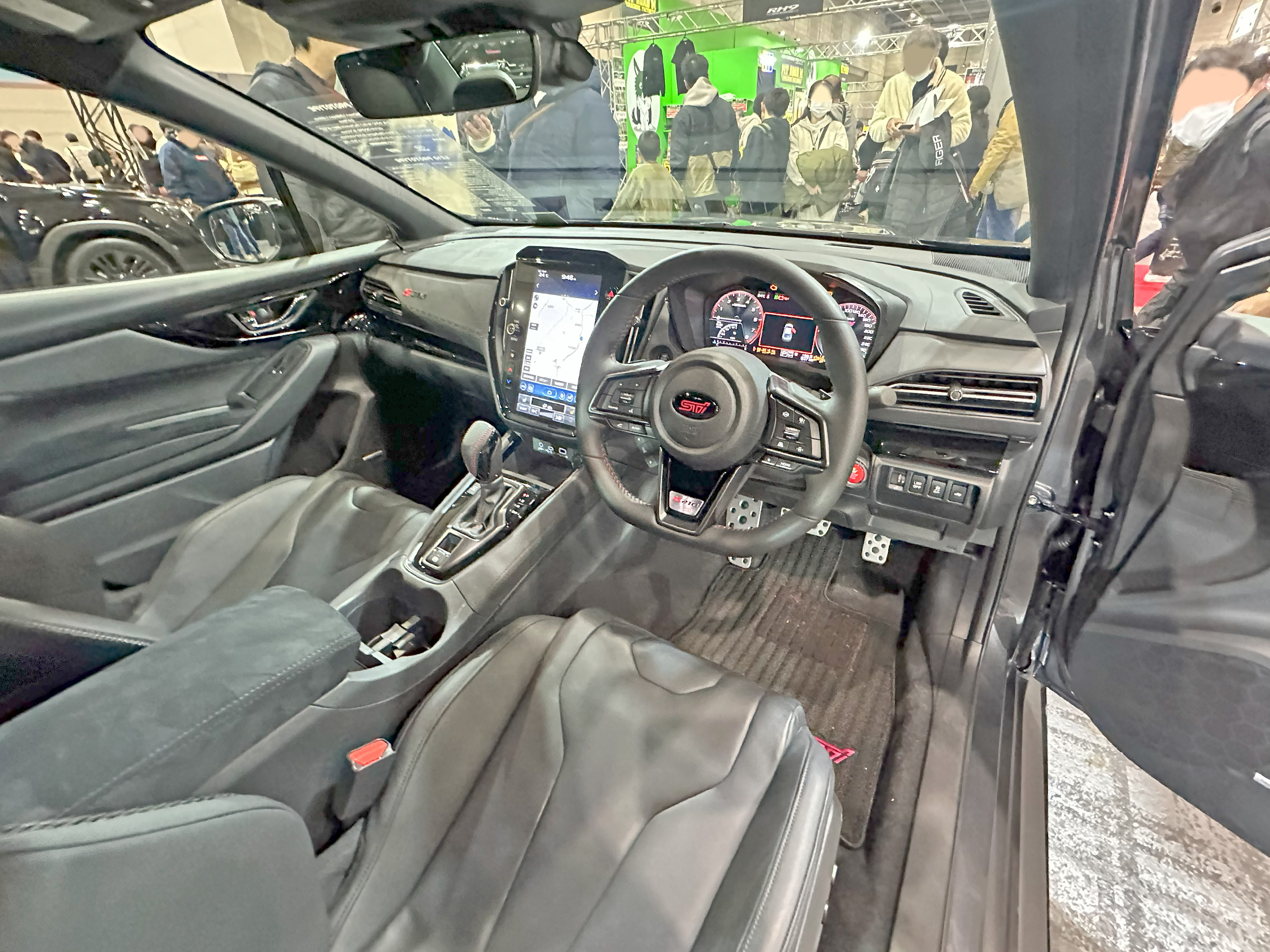
WRX S210 prototype interior

=== Station wagon ===
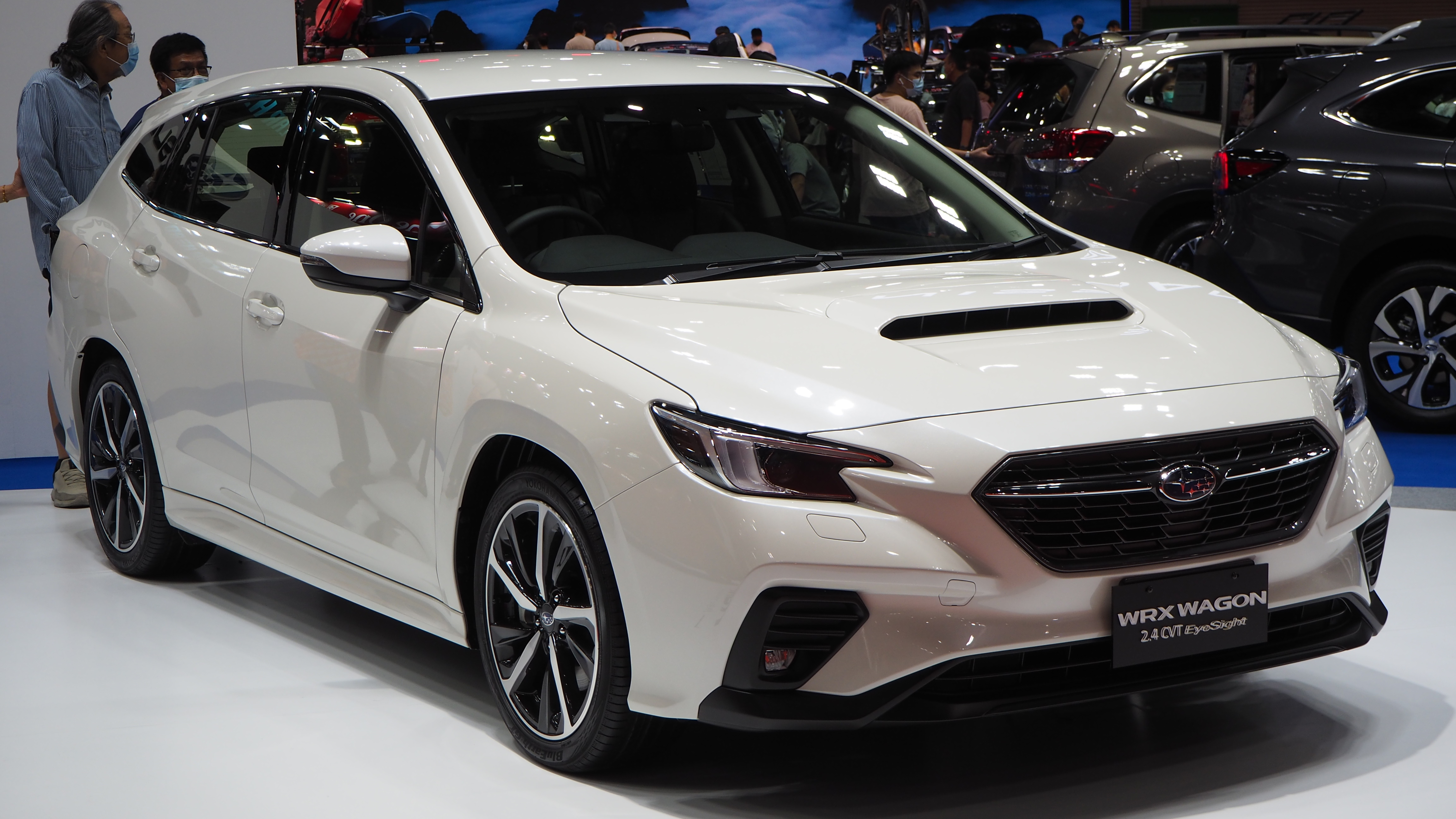
2022 WRX wagon

On 14 October 2021, the second-generation Levorg was introduced in Australia and New Zealand as the WRX Sportswagon and the WRX GT respectively. It is powered by the same 2.4-litre turbo boxer engine as the WRX saloon.

The WRX wagon was released in the Philippines in June 2022, in Thailand in August 2022, and in Singapore in January 2023.

=== Viziv concepts ===
Viziv concepts

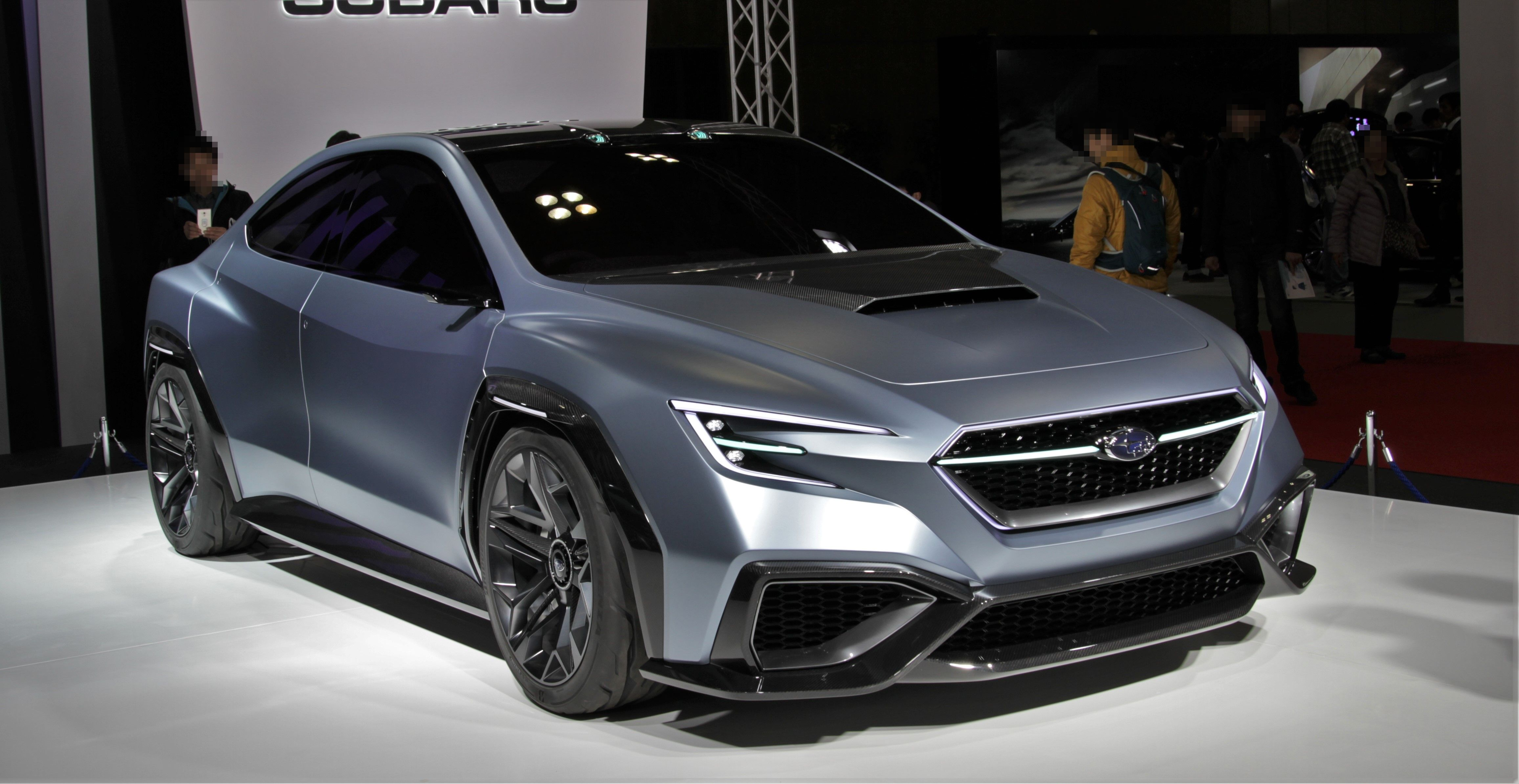
VIZIV Performance (2017)

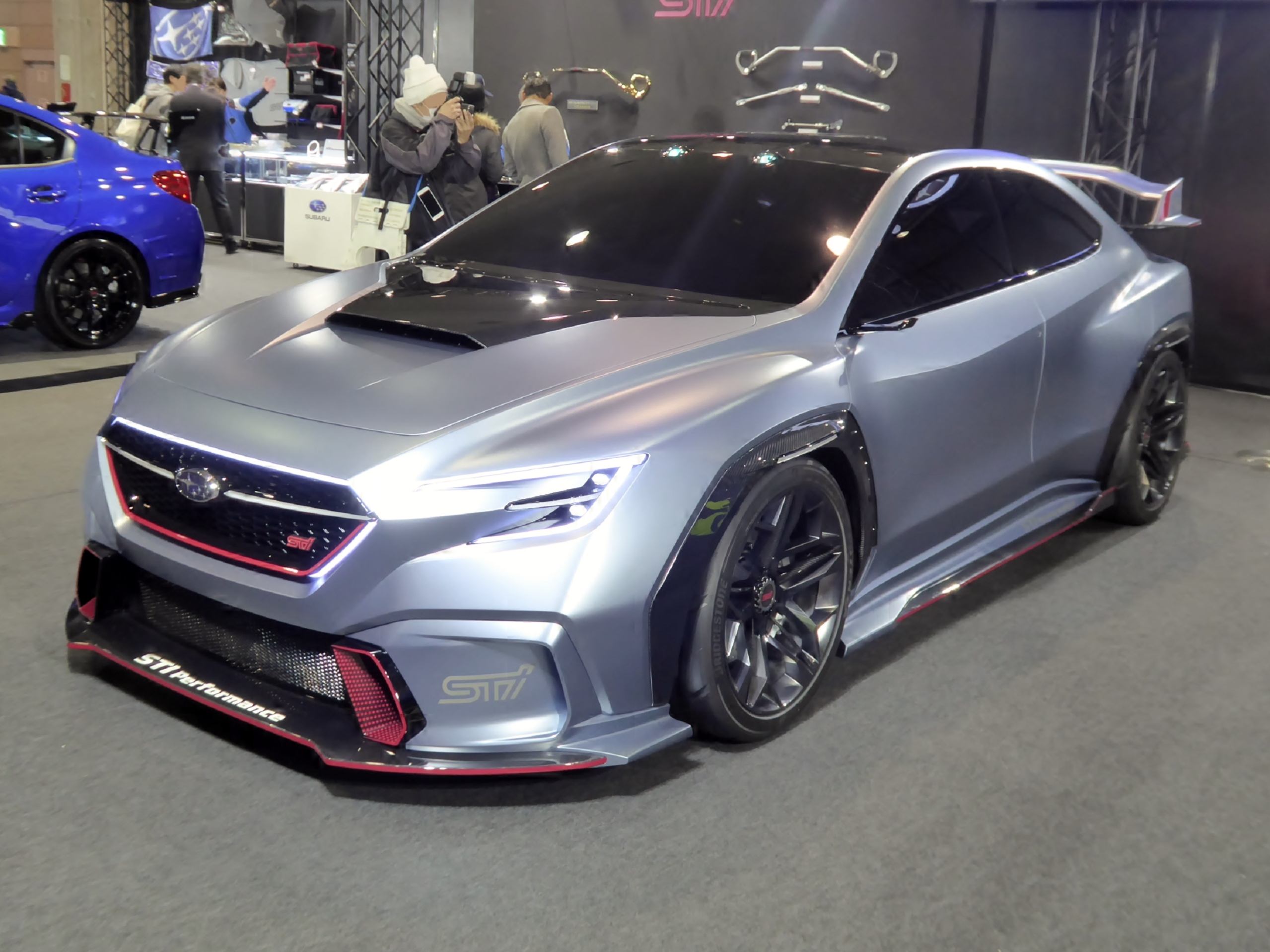
VIZIV Performance STI (2018)

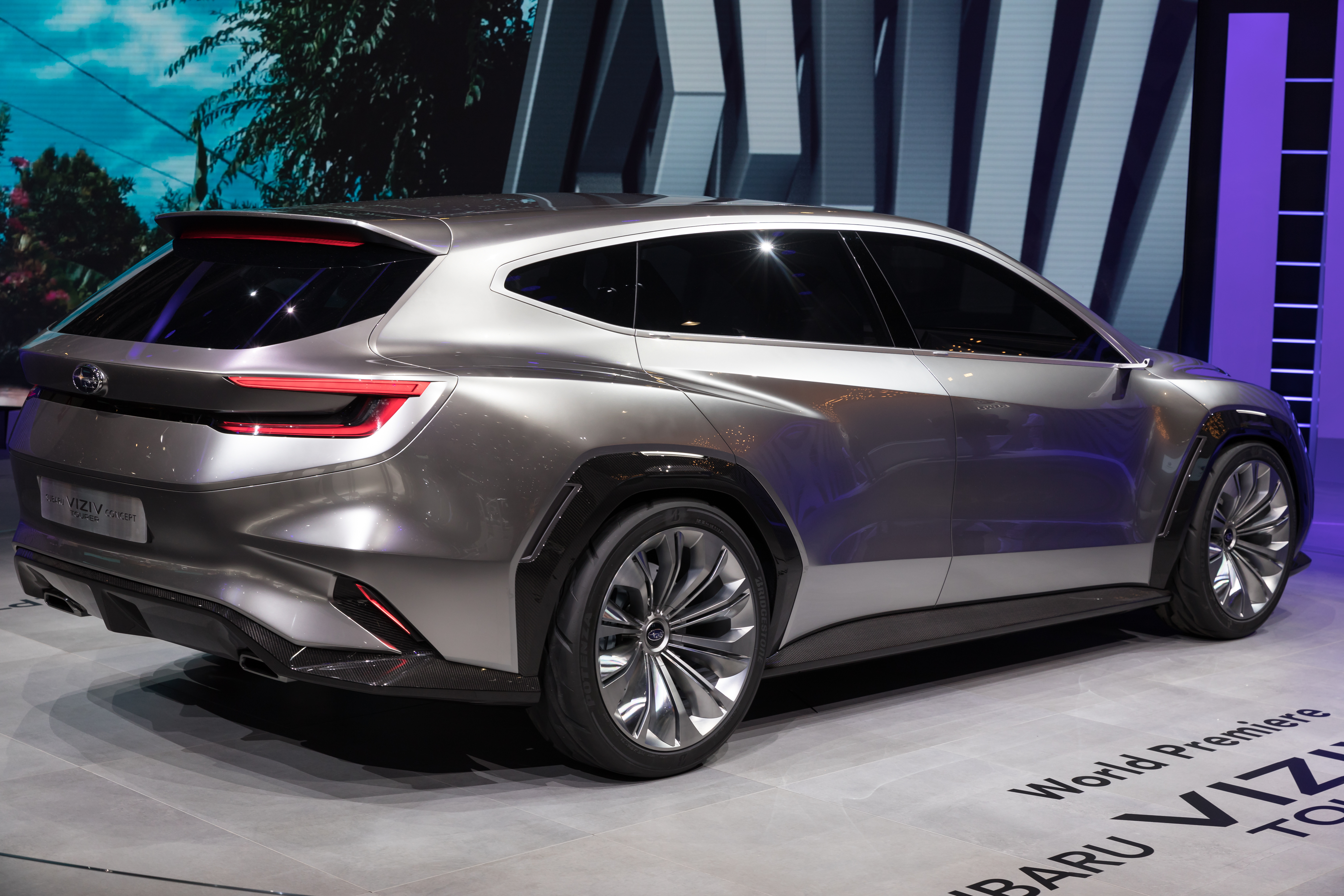
VIZIV Tourer (2018)

The automotive press speculated the Viziv Performance concept shown at the Tokyo Motor Show in October 2017 would set the styling direction for the forthcoming second-generation WRX. The Viziv Performance concept has a longer wheelbase than the first-generation (VA) WRX, increasing by 81 mm (3.2 in) to 2,730 mm (107.5 in), but the overall length increases by only 36 mm (1.4 in) to 4,630 mm (182.3 in), meaning the overhangs are shorter. Width is also increased on the Viziv Performance Concept, to 1,950 mm (77 in). Powertrain details were not released, only stating that it uses Subaru's Symmetrical AWD with a boxer engine.

An updated Viziv Performance STI Concept was shown at the Tokyo Auto Salon in January 2018, leading to further speculation those styling modifications could show up in a future WRX STI. The UK marketing director of Subaru, Chris Hawken, stated in November 2017 that the "Subaru Global Platform has been designed to take hybrid and electric" and "that is the way STI is going", leading to speculation the next WRX STI may use a hybrid drivetrain. The two Performance Concepts were followed by a similarly styled hatchback, the Viziv Tourer Concept, in March 2018.

== Sales ==
In the United States, sales have fallen since 2015, with 2015 being the peak year for the WRX even after including pre-split models.

Year	United States	Canada
2015	33,734	
2016	33,279	3,964
2017	31,358	4,616
2018	28,730	4,377
2019	21,838	2,706
2020	21,178	
2021	27,141	3,278
2022	18,662	
2023	24,681	
2024	18,587	
2025	10,930	

== Motorsport ==
=== Rallying ===
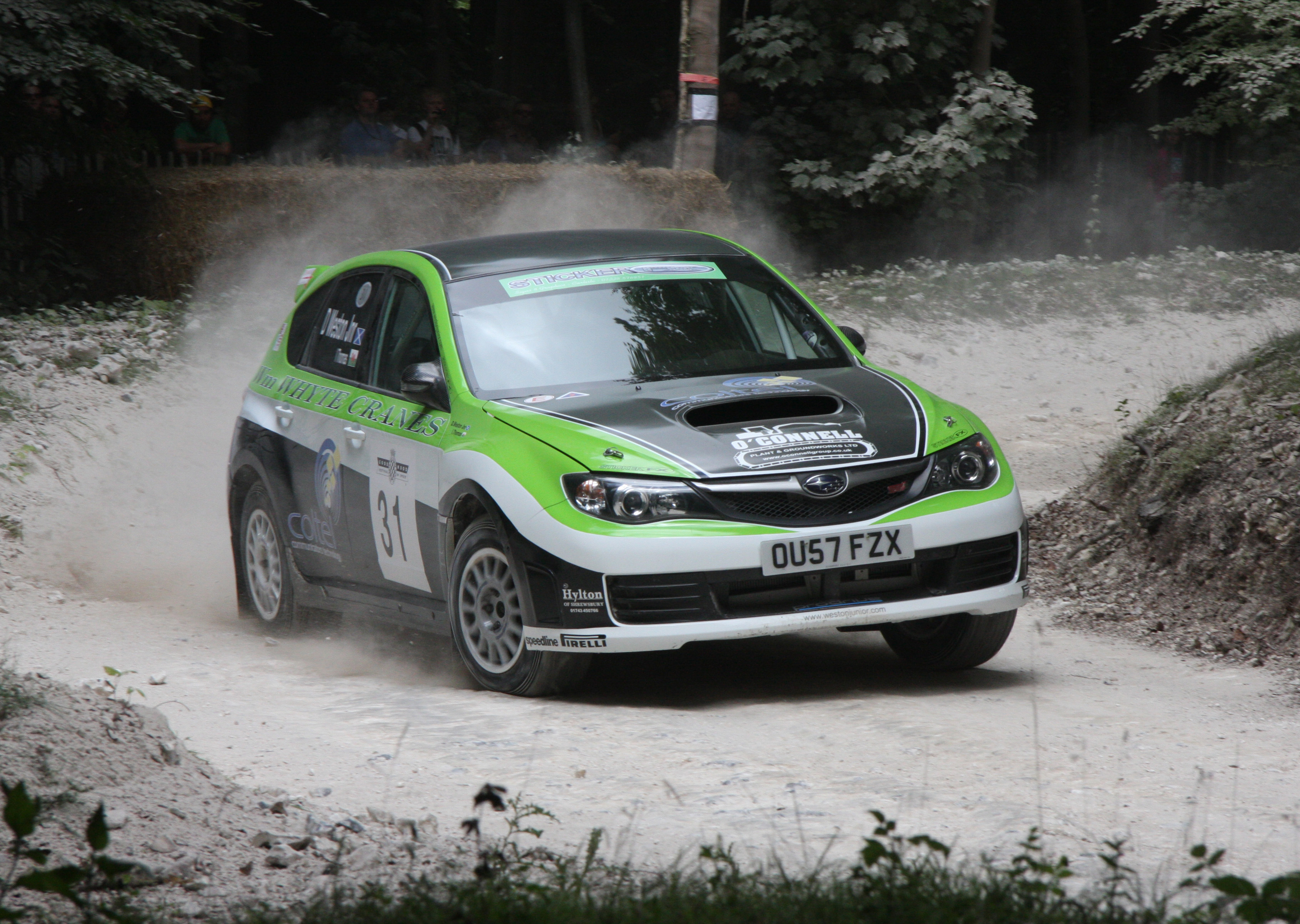
Subaru Impreza WRX STI (GR) in Goodwood Festival of Speed 2010 competition

In 1993, an Impreza Group A rally car was taken to Rally Finland after the Subaru Legacy rally car had its last outing at Rally New Zealand. The car was crashed in the race and was never used again for rally, but its good performance was noted, as it made 2nd place and was even leading the rally at one point. The Impreza was smaller and more nimble, giving it an advantage over the Legacy. In 1994, the WRX STI became available and entered use for WRC. Since then, Subaru has stopped competing in WRC, citing the Great Recession as a cause, though they still are active in rally events around the United States using the WRX STI as a basis for their competing cars.

In 2016, former British rally champion Mark Higgins lapped the Isle of Man TT course with the VA WRX STI in 17 minutes, 35.139 seconds.

=== Endurance ===
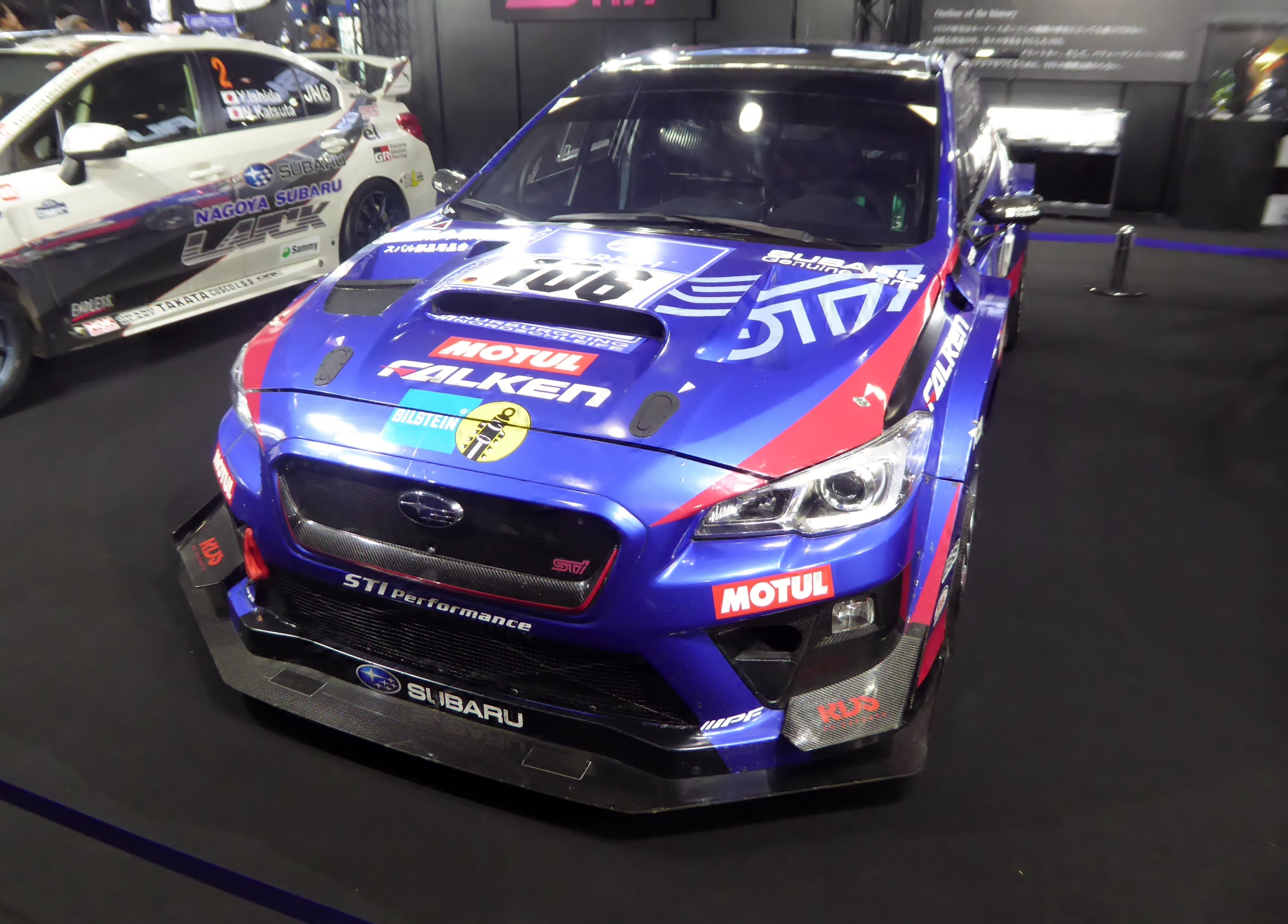
2016 SP3T class winner, exhibited at Osaka Auto Messe 2017

Subaru Tecnica International have campaigned the WRX STI in the Nürburgring 24 Hours since 2008, winning the SP3T class six times (2011, 2012, 2015, 2016, 2018, and 2019). STI did not enter the 2020 or 2021 contests due to the COVID-19 pandemic.

=== Touring car racing ===
Several touring cars based on the WRX STI were developed by the Italian company Top Run Motorsport and entered the TCR International Series from 2015 to 2017. Following this, the cars were sold to Australia and entered the full TCR Australia series in 2019. The car also made sporadic appearances in TCR Europe and TCR Italy from 2016 to 2018, and TCR UK in 2022 and 2025.

=== Project Midnight ===
Subaru WRX "Project Midnight"

In 2024, Subaru Motorsports USA and Vermont SportsCar debuted "Project Midnight", a prototype build of the WRX designed specifically for tarmac speed. The build has a carbon fiber body and uses a 2.0 liter flat-four engine producing 670 horsepower (500 kW) and 680 pound-feet (920 N⋅m) of torque.. It has a curb weight of 2,469 pounds (1,120 kg).

On July 14, 2024 it finished 2nd at the 2024 Goodwood Festival of Speed Hillclimb Shootout with a time of 0:46.07, driven by Scott Speed. Speed again finished in 2nd in 2025 with a time of 0:45.03.

In August 2026, Project Midnight, driven by Speed, set a new record in the Mount Washington Hillclimb Auto Race with a time of 5:11.89.
