= Subaru FB engine =

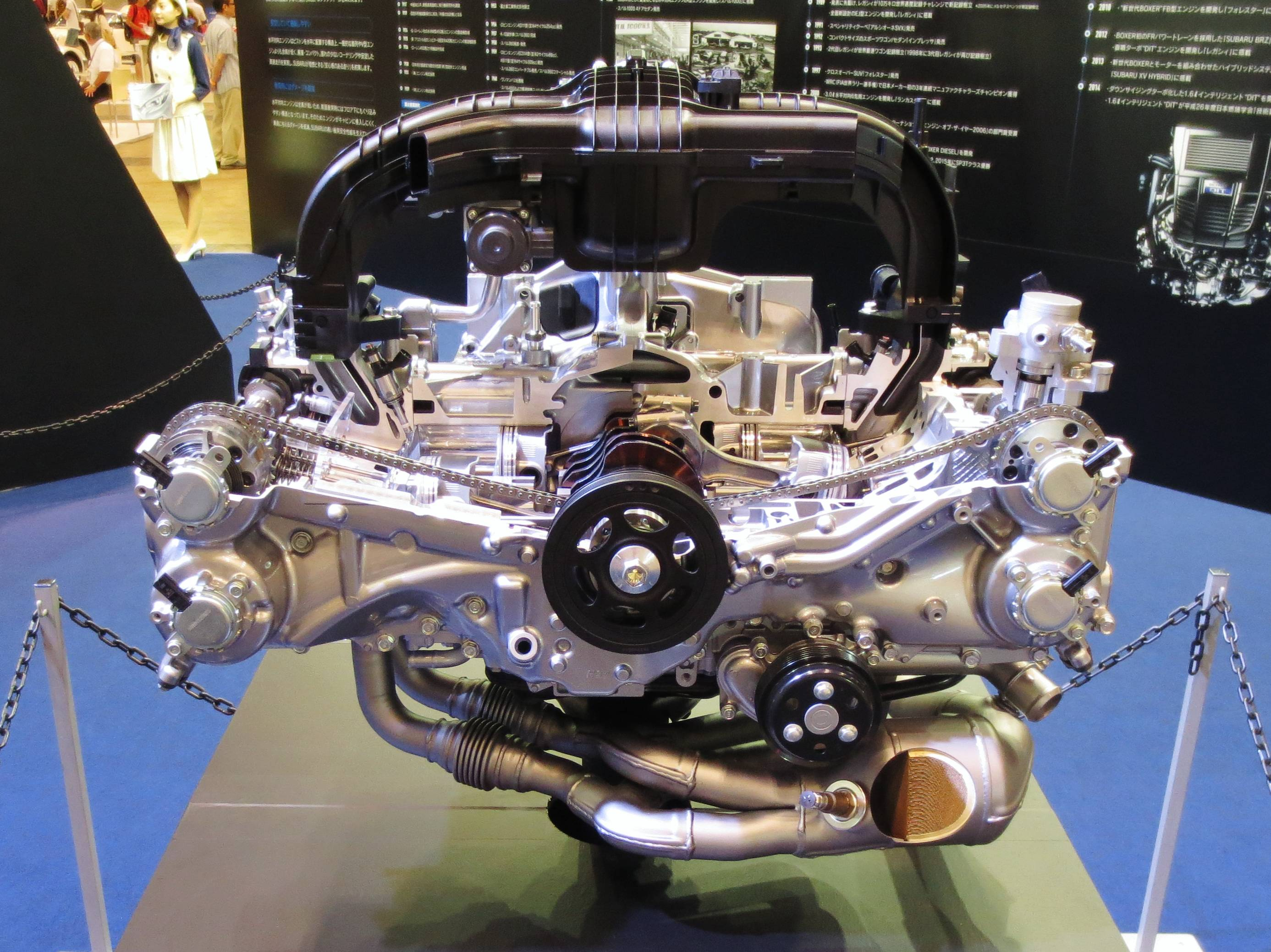

Overview
- Manufacturer: Subaru
- Production: 2010–present

Layout
- Configuration: Flat-4
- Displacement: 1.6 L (1,599 cc); 2.0 L (1,995 cc); 2.5 L (2,498 cc)
- Cylinder bore: 78.8 mm (3.10 in) (FB16); 84 mm (3.31 in) (FB20); 94 mm (3.7 in) (FB25)
- Piston stroke: 82 mm (3.23 in) (FB16); 90 mm (3.54 in) (FB20 & FB25)
- Valvetrain: DOHC 4 valves x cyl. with AVCS
- Compression ratio: 10.5:1, 11.0:1, 12.5:1

Combustion
- Turbocharger: Optional
- Fuel system: Fuel injection
- Fuel type: Gasoline
- Cooling system: Water-cooled

Output
- Power output: 84–136 kW (114–185 PS; 113–182 hp)
- Torque output: 15.3–25.5 kg⋅m (150–250 N⋅m; 111–184 lbf⋅ft)

Chronology
- Predecessor: EJ
- Successor: FA, CB

The Subaru FB engine is the third generation of gasoline boxer-4 engine used in Subaru automobiles, and was announced on 23 September 2010. It follows the previous generation EJ-series engine which was introduced in 1989 and the first generation EA-series which was introduced in 1966. By increasing piston stroke and decreasing piston bore, Subaru aimed to reduce emissions and improve fuel economy, while increasing and broadening torque output compared to the EJ-series.

The Subaru FA engine series was derived later from the FB, but the two engine families share only a few common parts. In 2020, Subaru introduced the CB18 engine with improved efficiency to succeed the FB in several applications.

== Overview ==
Unofficially, Subaru stated that "FB" stands for "FHI/Future and Brand New/Boxer". It was announced in September 2010 as the third generation (following the EA 1st and EJ 2nd generations) boxer engine family with 1.6, 2.0, and 2.5 litre naturally aspirated and turbo-charged variants. The FB has an all new block and head featuring dual overhead cams with intake and exhaust variable valve timing (which Subaru designates as AVCS, standing for Active Valve Control System), and a timing chain that replaced the timing belt. Moving to chain-driven cams is said to allow the valves to be placed at a narrower angle to each other and shrink the bore of cylinders from 99.5 to 94 mm (3.92 to 3.70 in). It results in less unburned fuel during cold start, thereby reducing emissions. Subaru was able to maintain the exterior dimensions substantially unchanged by making the cylinder heads smaller. (Note: Mostly through the use of smaller and shorter valves with tighter bends in the ports, shorter and larger-diameter valve springs, and the smaller cam base-circle enabled by roller rockers. There have been sources that claim the conrods with diagonally split big-end caps are the reason for the more or less unchanged engine width, but the center-to-center conrod length is longer than on the EJ. The diagonal split of big-end caps like those in the EZ36 engine was for retaining serviceability to pistons (by providing a torque wrench access to the upper big-end bolts through the oil-pan opening in the bottom, for removal through the bore together with the piston) without disassembling the crank case. On the EJ, piston removability was accommodated by a special service hole on the sides of the cylinders, allowing for the removal of the piston wrist pin without removing the conrods.) The FB is only marginally heavier than an equivalent-displacement EJ. In Jan 2011, Car and Driver was told direct injection would be added soon, which became reality by the introduction of FB16DIT in 2014.

Subaru claims a 28-percent reduction in friction losses, mainly due to the addition of roller rockers in between the cam and the valve, lighter pistons and connecting rods, as well as polymar coating on piston skirts. A lighter 0W-20 oil in combination with a compact oil pump is also credited with contributing to the reduction in friction losses. Approximately 1 litre more oil is held in the system as the newly adopted timing chain requires an oil supply. The FB has a 10% improvement in fuel economy with the power coming on sooner and the torque band being broader.

The compression ratio is slightly higher, and the stroke has increased compared to the EJ engine; previously, the chassis precluded a longer stroke. These changes improve combustion efficiency and allow higher torque at lower speeds. The FB is built at Gunma Oizumi Plant and was initially available as a 2.5 litre displacement engine, starting in Forester models, with 1.6 and 2.0 litre versions to follow in Imprezas.

== FB16 ==
All FB16 variants:

- Displacement: 1,600 cc (1.6 L) DOHC
- Bore x stroke: 78.8 mm × 82 mm (3.10 in × 3.23 in)

=== FB16 ===
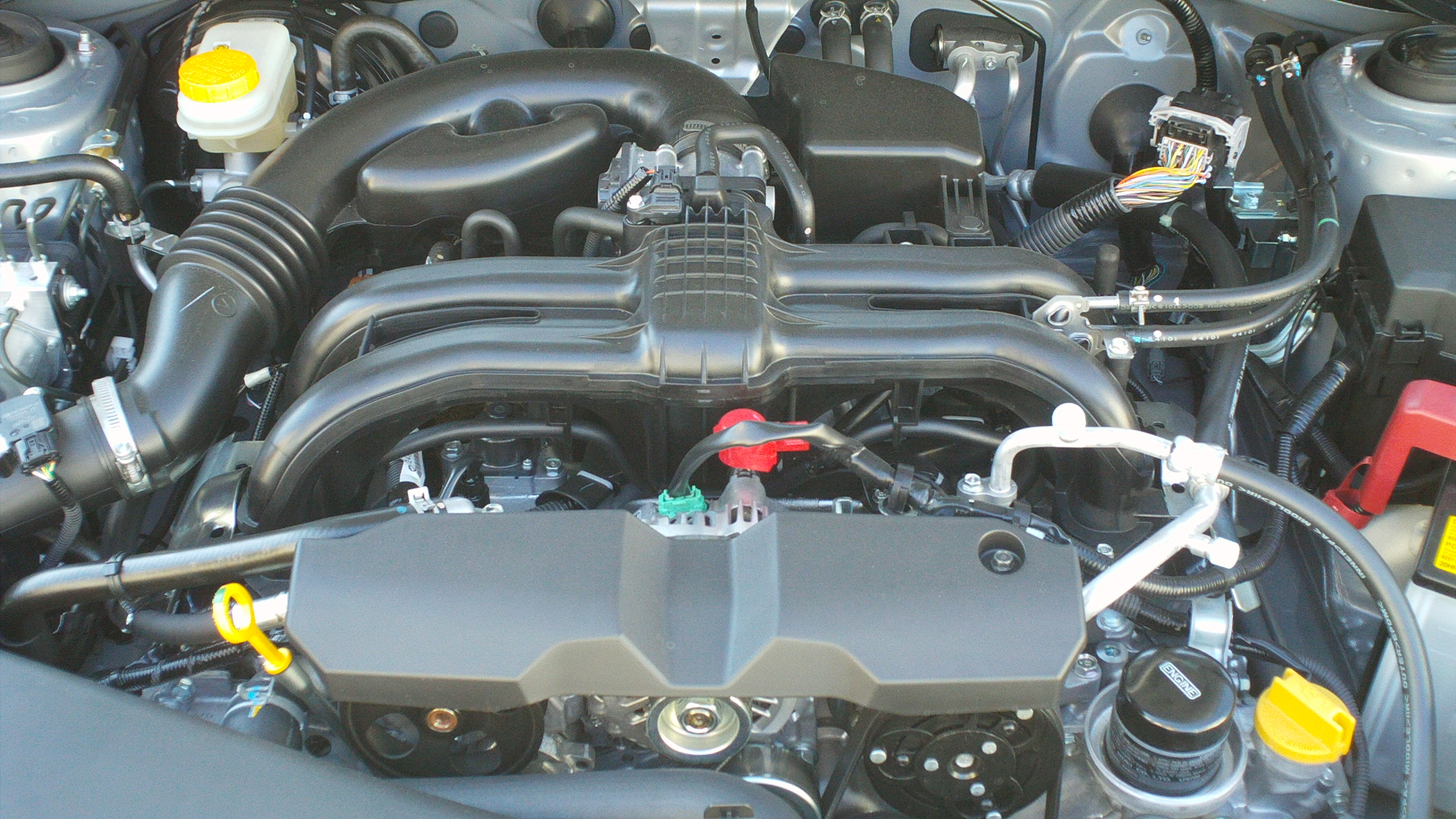
Subaru FB16

- Compression: 11.0:1
- 2012+ EUDM Subaru Impreza XV 1.6i
  - Power: 84 kW (114 PS; 113 hp) at 5,600 rpm
  - Torque: 15.3 kg⋅m (150 N⋅m; 111 lb⋅ft) at 4,000 rpm
- 2017+ EUDM Subaru Impreza and 2018+ Subaru XV
  - Power: 84 kW (114 PS; 113 hp) at 6,200 rpm
  - Torque: 15.3 kg⋅m (150 N⋅m; 111 lb⋅ft) at 3,600 rpm
- 2017+ JDM Subaru Impreza and 2018+ Subaru XV
  - Power: 115 PS (85 kW; 113 hp) at 6,200 rpm
  - Torque: 15.1 kg⋅m (148 N⋅m; 109 lb⋅ft) at 3,600 rpm

=== FB16 DIT ===
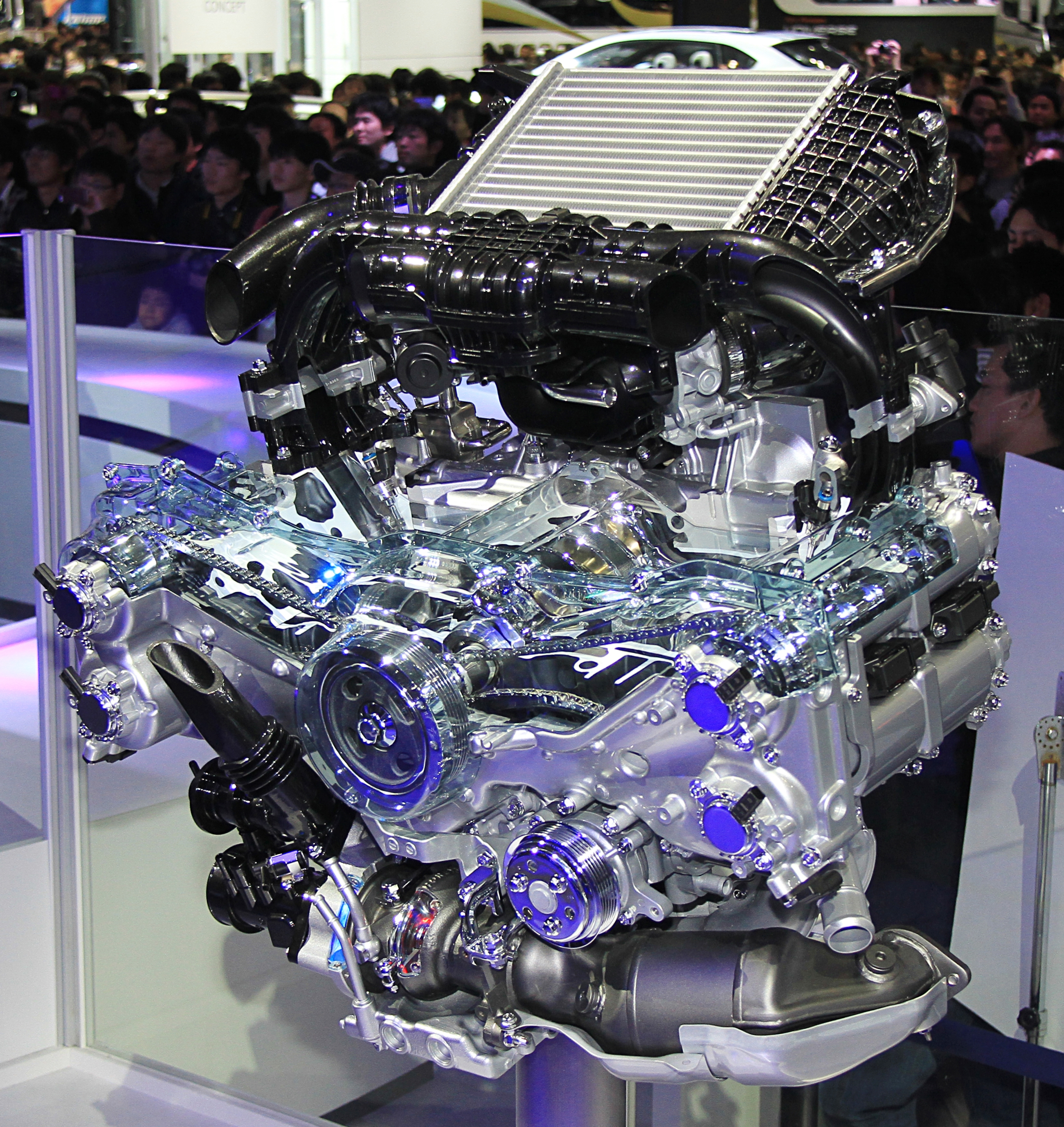
Subaru FB16 DIT

The FB16 direct injection turbocharged (DIT) engine is the first FB-series engine with a turbocharger, and includes direct injection with an auto stop/start system. It is the base engine in the first-generation (2014–20 model years) Subaru Levorg. The Levorg also has an option for a 2.0 litre direct injection turbo engine, the FA20F. The design target for the FB16 DIT engine was to equal or exceed the performance of the FB25 naturally-aspirated engine fitted to the Legacy, using regular gasoline, according to the designer, Rei Sasaki. Although it shares its displacement with the naturally aspirated FB16, the only part the two engines share is the crankshaft. As fitted to the Levorg (1,540kg, CVT), the FB16 DIT was able to achieve fuel economy of 16.0 km/L (38 mpg_{‑US}) on the JC08 cycle, compared to 15.6 km/L (37 mpg_{‑US}) of FB16 on Impreza G4 (1,320kg, CVT).

- Compression: 11.0:1
- Application: 2014–20 Subaru Levorg
  - Power: 125 kW (170 PS; 168 hp) at 4,800–5,600 rpm
  - Torque: 25.5 kg⋅m (250 N⋅m; 184 lbf⋅ft) at 1,800–4,800 rpm

== FB20 ==
The prior EJ20 used an oversquare 92 mm × 75 mm (3.62 in × 2.95 in) bore and stroke for a 1,994 cc (2.0 L) swept displacement; in comparison, the FB20 features an undersquare bore and stroke for a slightly larger displacement.

All FB20 variants:

- Displacement: 1,995 cc (2.0 L) DOHC
- Bore x stroke: 84 mm × 90 mm (3.31 in × 3.54 in)

=== FB20B ===
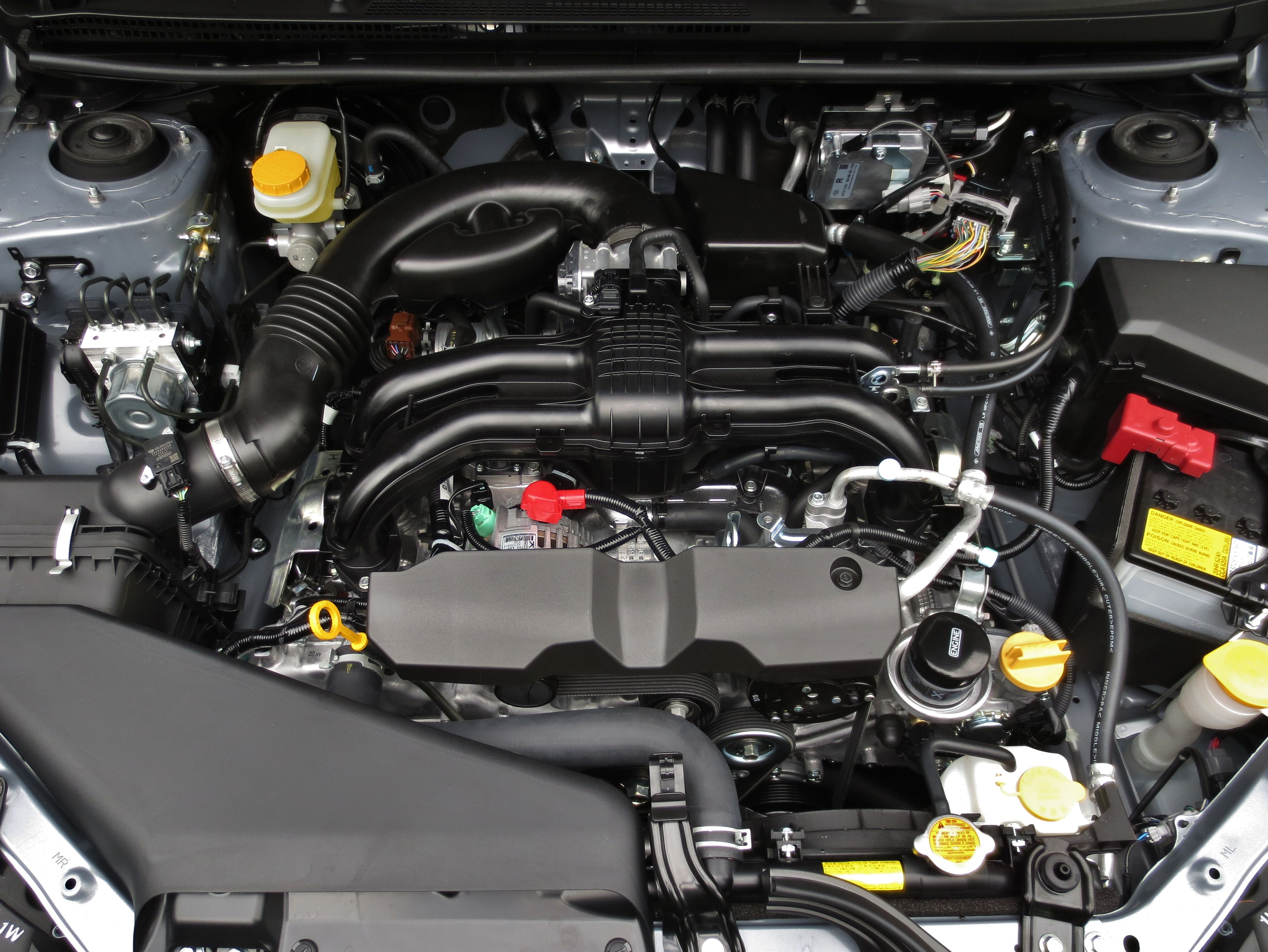
Subaru FB20B

- Compression: 10.5:1
- 2011+ JDM Subaru Forester:
  - Power: 109 kW (148 PS; 146 hp) at 6,000 rpm
  - Torque: 20 kg⋅m (196 N⋅m; 145 lbf⋅ft) at 4,200 rpm
- 2012–2016 Subaru Impreza, 2012–2017 Subaru XV/Crosstrek, and EUDM 2019–2020 Subaru Levorg:
  - Power: 110 kW (150 PS; 148 hp) at 6,200 rpm
  - Torque: 20 kg⋅m (196 N⋅m; 145 lbf⋅ft) at 4,200 rpm

=== FB20X ===
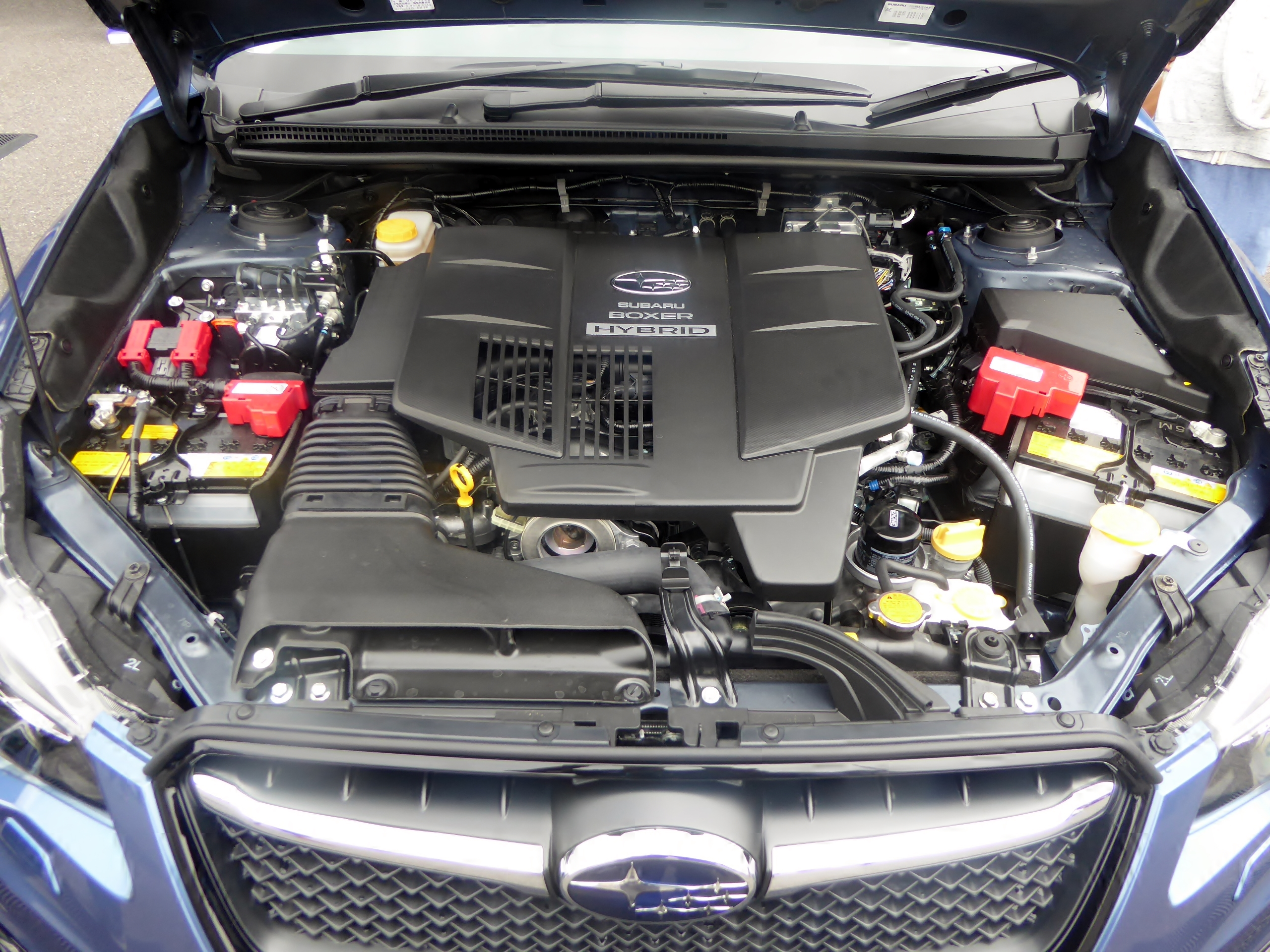
Subaru FB20X

The existing FB20B was modified by reducing internal friction for the hybrid drivetrain, which incorporates an electric motor in the Lineartronic CVT. The high-voltage traction battery is installed below the cargo area for better weight balance. Combined system power is stated to be 160 hp (119 kW). Output of the gasoline engine is comparable to that of the non-hybrid FB20B.

- Compression: 10.8:1
- Application: 2014–16 Subaru XV/Crosstrek Hybrid
- Combined system output:
  - Power: 160 hp (162 PS; 119 kW) at 6,000 rpm
  - Torque: 163 lb⋅ft (221 N⋅m; 23 kg⋅m) at 2,000 rpm
- Gasoline engine output:
  - Power: 148 hp (150 PS; 110 kW)
  - Torque: 145 lb⋅ft (197 N⋅m; 20 kg⋅m)
- Electric motor output:
  - Power: 13.4 hp (14 PS; 10 kW)
  - Torque: 48.0 lb⋅ft (65 N⋅m; 7 kg⋅m)

=== FB20D ===
Used in the fifth generation Impreza sedan and hatchback; compared to the FB20B, the FB20D adds direct injection, providing a slight increase in power and efficiency.

- Compression: 12.5:1
- 2017–2026 Subaru Impreza and 2018–2025 Subaru XV/Crosstrek
  - Power (JDM, USDM) : 113 kW (154 PS; 152 hp) at 6,000 rpm
  - Power (EUDM, AUDM, THDM): 115 kW (156 PS; 154 hp) at 6,000 rpm
  - Torque: 20 kg⋅m (196 N⋅m; 145 lbf⋅ft) at 4,000 rpm

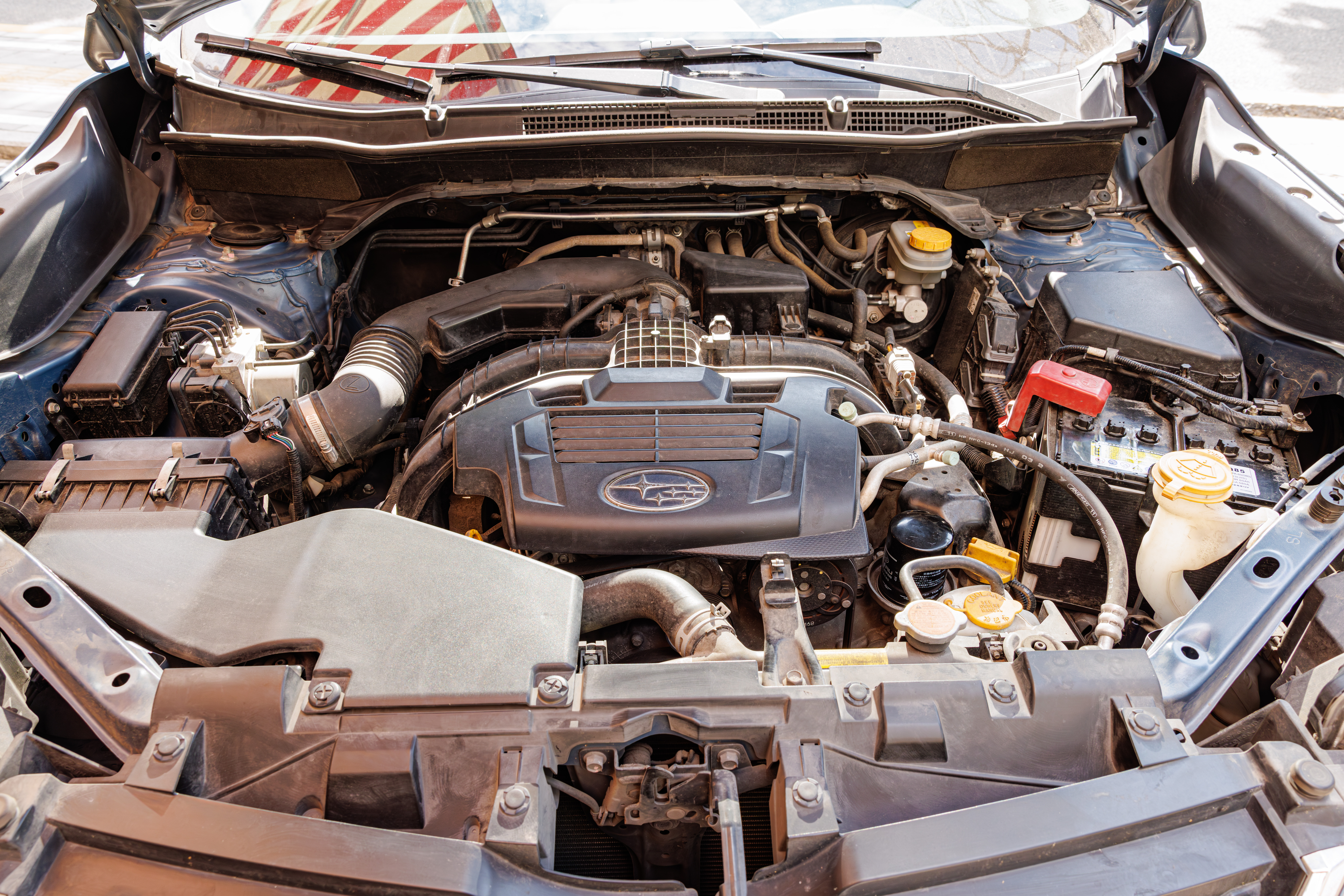
Subaru FB20D Engine

=== FB20V ===
The 2019 Crosstrek is available with a plug-in hybrid system sourced from Toyota. The new hybrid drivetrain uses two motor-generator units; the traction motor (MG2) and battery are significantly larger compared to the previous XV Crosstrek Hybrid, and the vehicle is capable of moving under electric power alone for a limited distance. MG2 is used under parallel hybrid operation as well. MG1 is used as the starter motor and charges the battery for series hybrid operation. The direct-injection FB20V in the revised hybrid is detuned compared to the conventional FB20D.

- Application: 2019–2023 Subaru Crosstrek Hybrid (PHEV)
- Combined system output:
  - Power: 148 hp (150 PS; 110 kW)
- Gasoline engine output:
  - Power: 137 hp (139 PS; 102 kW) at 5,600 rpm
  - Torque: 134 lb⋅ft (182 N⋅m; 19 kg⋅m) at 4,400 rpm
- Electric traction motor (MG2) output:
  - Power: 118 hp (120 PS; 88 kW)
  - Torque: 149 lb⋅ft (202 N⋅m; 21 kg⋅m)

=== FB20D e-Boxer ===
The direct-injection FB20D was also used in a mild parallel hybrid configuration similar to the FB20X. The mild hybrid drivetrain was fitted to selected trims for models sold in Japan (Forester, July 2018 and XV, October 2018), Europe (same models, starting in 2019), and Australia (same models, starting in 2020).

- Application: 2019+ JDM and EUDM Subaru XV and Forester, selected models
- Combined system output:
  - Power: 107 kW (145 PS; 143 hp) at 6,000 rpm
  - Torque: 188 N⋅m (19 kg⋅m; 139 lb⋅ft) at 4,000 rpm
- Gasoline engine output:
  - Power: 145 PS (107 kW; 143 hp)
  - Torque: 188 N⋅m (19 kg⋅m; 139 lb⋅ft)
- Electric motor output:
  - Power: 10 kW (14 PS; 13 hp)
  - Torque: 65 N⋅m (7 kg⋅m; 48 lb⋅ft)

== FB25 ==
Compared to the previous EJ25, which had a displacement of 2,457 cc (2.5 L) from an oversquare 99.5 mm × 79 mm (3.92 in × 3.11 in) bore and stroke, the FB25 has slightly larger displacement on a less oversquare bore and stroke.

All FB25 variants:

- Displacement: 2,498 cc (2.5 L) DOHC
- Bore x stroke: 94 mm × 90 mm (3.70 in × 3.54 in)

=== FB25B ===
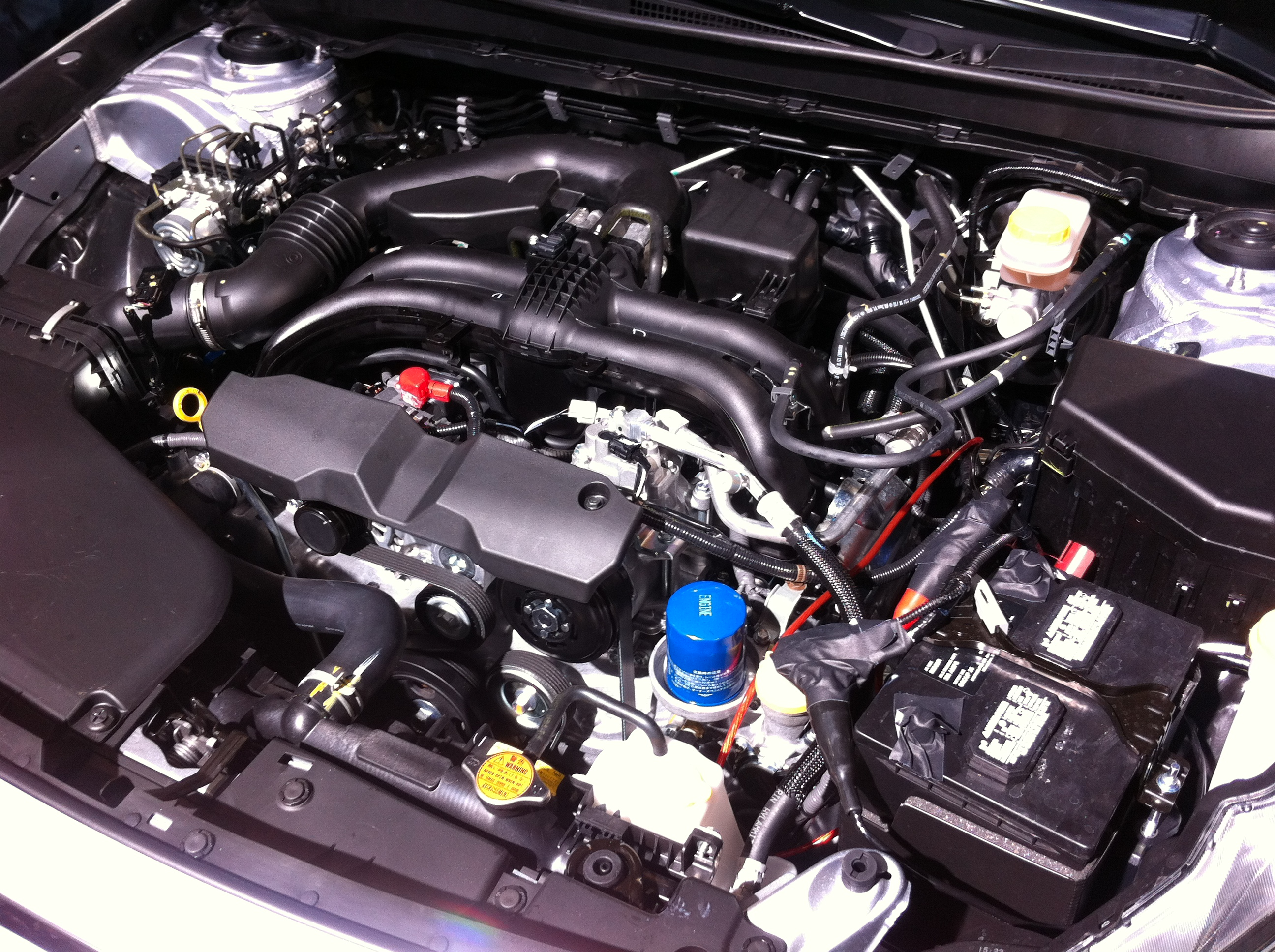
Subaru FB25B

- Compression: 10.0:1
- Power: 170 hp (172 PS; 127 kW) at 5,800 rpm
- Torque: 174 lb⋅ft (236 N⋅m; 24 kg⋅m) at 4,100 rpm
- Application:
  - 2011–18 North American Subaru Forester
  - 2013–19 North American Subaru Legacy
  - 2013–19 North American Subaru Outback

=== FB25D ===
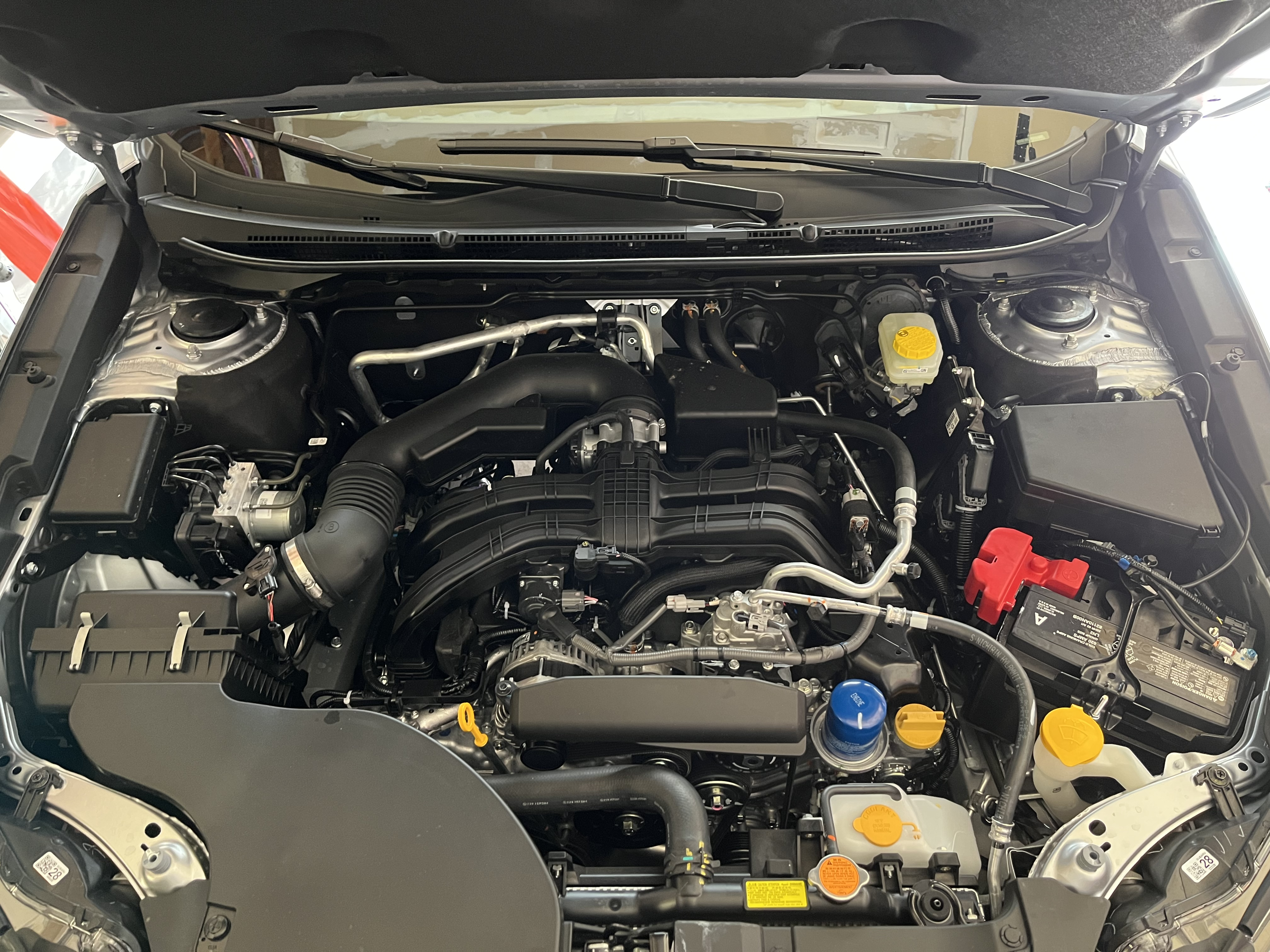
Subaru FB25D

The 2019 model year Subaru Forester was introduced at the 2018 New York International Auto Show with a revised version of the FB25 engine featuring direct injection, resulting in a slight boost in power and fuel economy. The seventh-generation 2020 model year Legacy and Outback also adopted the revised direct-injection FB25D as its base engine. For Strong Hybrid applications, the engine makes 162 horsepower, with an additional electric motor rated at 118 hp and 199 pound-feet, can produce as much as 194 horsepower if combined.

- Compression: 12.0:1
- 2019–2025 (Note: The standard fifth-generation Forester was discontinued after the 2024 model year; only the Forester Wilderness was offered for the 2025 model year.) Subaru Forester, 2020–2025 Subaru Legacy (non-XT, non-Sport (Note: 2023–2025 model years only.)), 2020–2025 Subaru Outback (non-XT, non-Wilderness), 2021–2023 Subaru Crosstrek (U.S. Sport and Limited trims; Canadian Outdoor and Limited trims)
  - Power: 182 hp (185 PS; 136 kW) at 5,800 rpm
  - Torque: 176 lb⋅ft (239 N⋅m; 24 kg⋅m) at 4,400 rpm
- 2024–2025 Subaru Crosstrek (U.S. Premium (Note: 2025 model year only.), Sport, Limited, and Wilderness trims; Canadian Onyx, Limited, and Wilderness trims), 2024–2025 Subaru Impreza (RS trim)
  - Power: 182 hp (185 PS; 136 kW) at 5,800 rpm
  - Torque: 178 lb⋅ft (241 N⋅m; 24.6 kg⋅m) at 3,700 rpm
- 2025+ Subaru Forester, 2026+ Subaru Outback (non-XT, non-Wilderness), 2026+ Subaru Crosstrek (all trims), 2026 Subaru Impreza (RS trim), 2027+ Subaru Impreza (all trims)
  - Power: 180 hp (182 PS; 134 kW) at 5,800 rpm
  - Torque: 178 lb⋅ft (241 N⋅m; 24.6 kg⋅m) at 3,700 rpm
- 2025+ Subaru Forester Hybrid, 2026+ Subaru Crosstrek Hybrid, 2026+ Subaru Levorg Layback Hybrid
  - Power: 162 hp (164 PS; 121 kW) (engine only) & 194 hp (197 PS; 145 kW) (combined)
  - Torque: 154 lb⋅ft (209 N⋅m; 21.3 kg⋅m) at 3,700 rpm
