= Subaru Crosstrek =

Compact crossover SUV

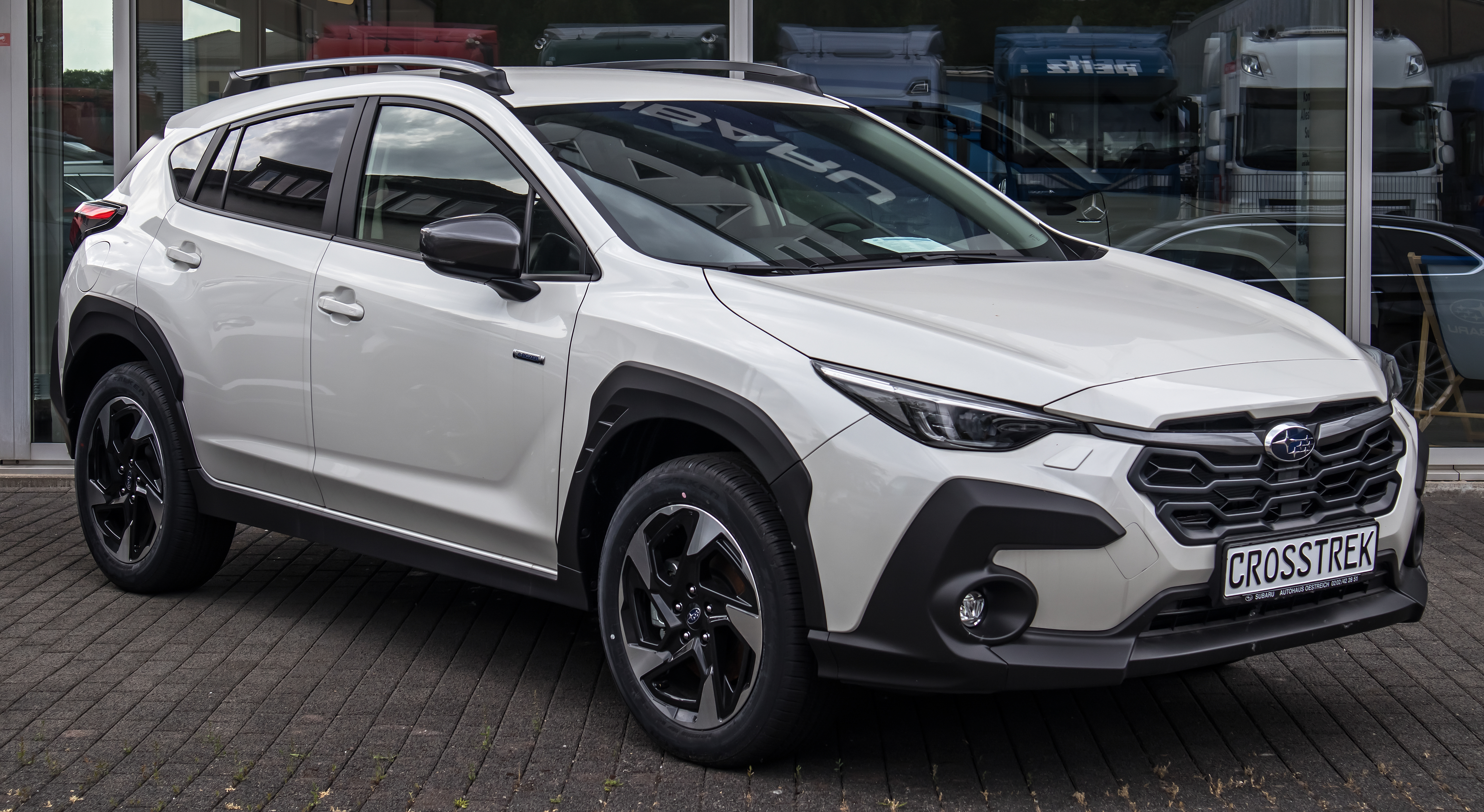

Overview
- Manufacturer: Subaru
- Also called: Subaru XV (outside of North America, until 2022); Subaru XV Crosstrek (North America, 2013–2015)
- Production: 2012–present
- Model years: 2013–present

Body and chassis
- Class: Compact crossover SUV (C)
- Body style: 5-door SUV
- Layout: Front-engine, all-wheel drive; Front-engine, front-wheel drive (Japan, 2022–present)
- Related: Subaru Impreza

Chronology
- Predecessor: Subaru Outback Sport (North America); Subaru Impreza XV (global markets)

The Subaru Crosstrek (Japanese: スバル・クロストレック, Hepburn: Subaru Kurosutorekku; also known as the Subaru XV globally for the first two generations) is a compact crossover SUV produced by Subaru since 2012. It is a successor to the Outback Sport in North America, and the Impreza XV globally. Like the Outback Sport, the Crosstrek is a lifted Impreza hatchback with minor differences, though with a more substantial lift than the Outback Sport.

Initially, the vehicle was marketed as the XV globally, and as the XV Crosstrek in North America. In 2015, Subaru dropped the XV moniker in North America, marketing it simply as the Crosstrek for the 2016 model year and onward. In 2022, Subaru introduced the third-generation model, using the Crosstrek nameplate globally for the first time.

All generations of the Crosstrek are raised versions of the Subaru Impreza hatchback.

== First generation (GP; 2012) ==
First generation
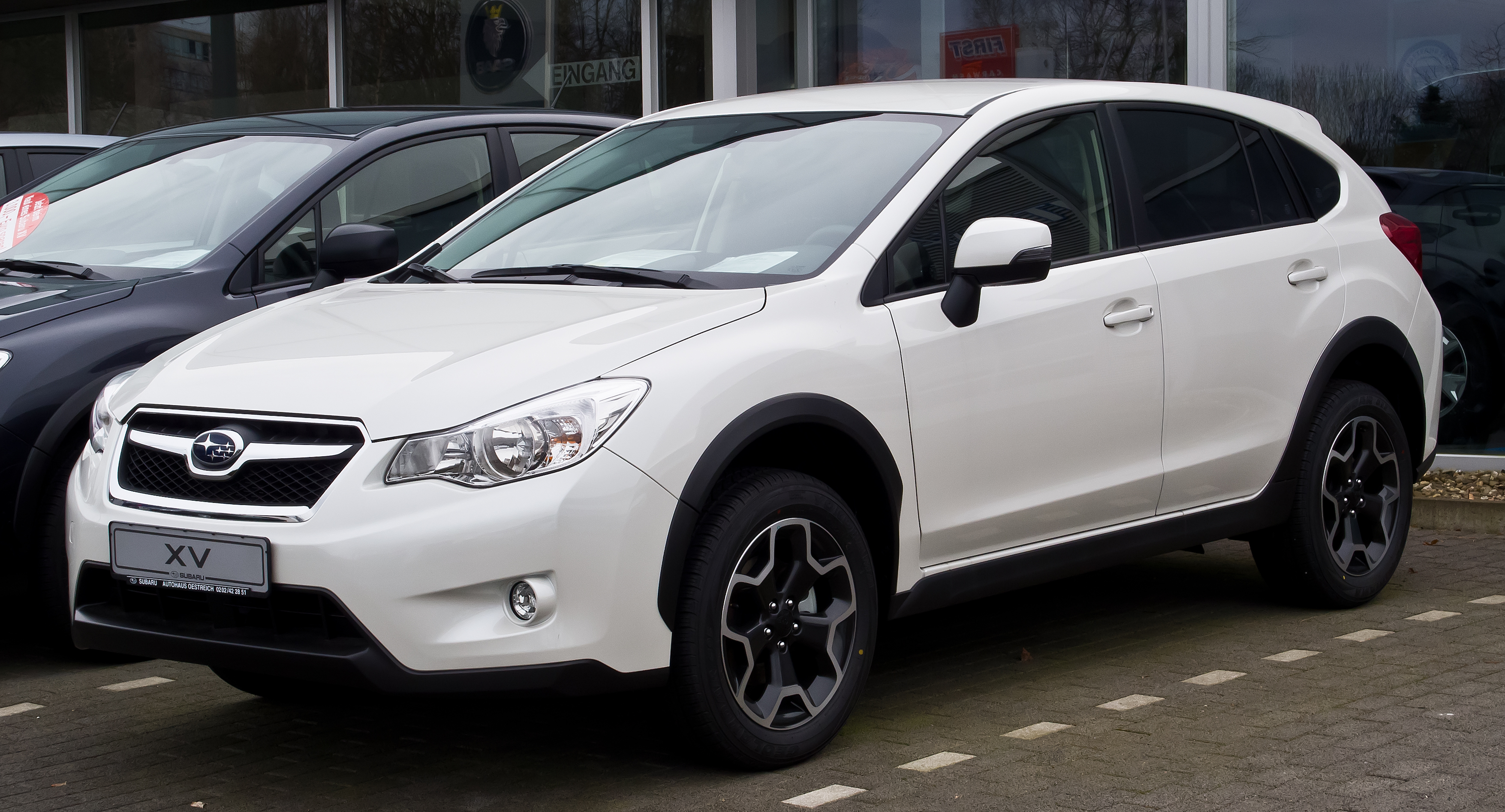
- 2014 Subaru XV (Germany)

Overview
- Model code: GP
- Also called: Subaru XV; Subaru XV Crosstrek (North America, 2013–2015)
- Production: 2012–2017
- Model years: 2013–2017 (North America)
- Assembly: Japan: Ōta, Gunma (Main Plant; Yajima Plant); Malaysia: Kuala Lumpur (TCMA)

Body and chassis
- Related: Subaru Impreza (GJ/GP); Subaru Levorg (VM); Subaru WRX (VA)

Powertrain
- Engine: Gasoline: 1.6 L FB16 H4; 2.0 L FB20B H4; Gasoline hybrid: 2.0 L FB20X H4; Diesel: 2.0 L EE20 H4
- Electric motor: 13.4 hp (14 PS; 10 kW) Permanent-magnet synchronous AC motor (Hybrid)
- Transmission: Lineartronic CVT; 5-speed manual 6-speed manual (Europe, South America and Australia)

Dimensions
- Wheelbase: 2,635 mm (103.7 in)
- Length: 4,450 mm (175.2 in)
- Width: 1,750 mm (68.9 in)
- Height: 1,570 mm (61.8 in)

=== Concept ===
Subaru showcased the Subaru XV concept vehicle in 2011. Based on a raised suspension version of the Subaru Impreza 5-door hatchback, the XV concept offered aluminum alloy wheels with silver spokes, black wheels and clear blue center caps; yellow-green body color, silvery white leather interior upholstery at seats, mesh in selected interior areas with yellow/green piping, multifunction display with navigation, car audio, and vehicle information in the center panel; EyeSight driving assist with stereo cameras and LCD monitor between the two combination meters, 2.0-liter four-cylinder horizontally opposed DOHC engine, Lineartronic CVT, and 245/45 ZR19 tires. The concept vehicle was unveiled at Auto Shanghai 2011.

=== Production version ===
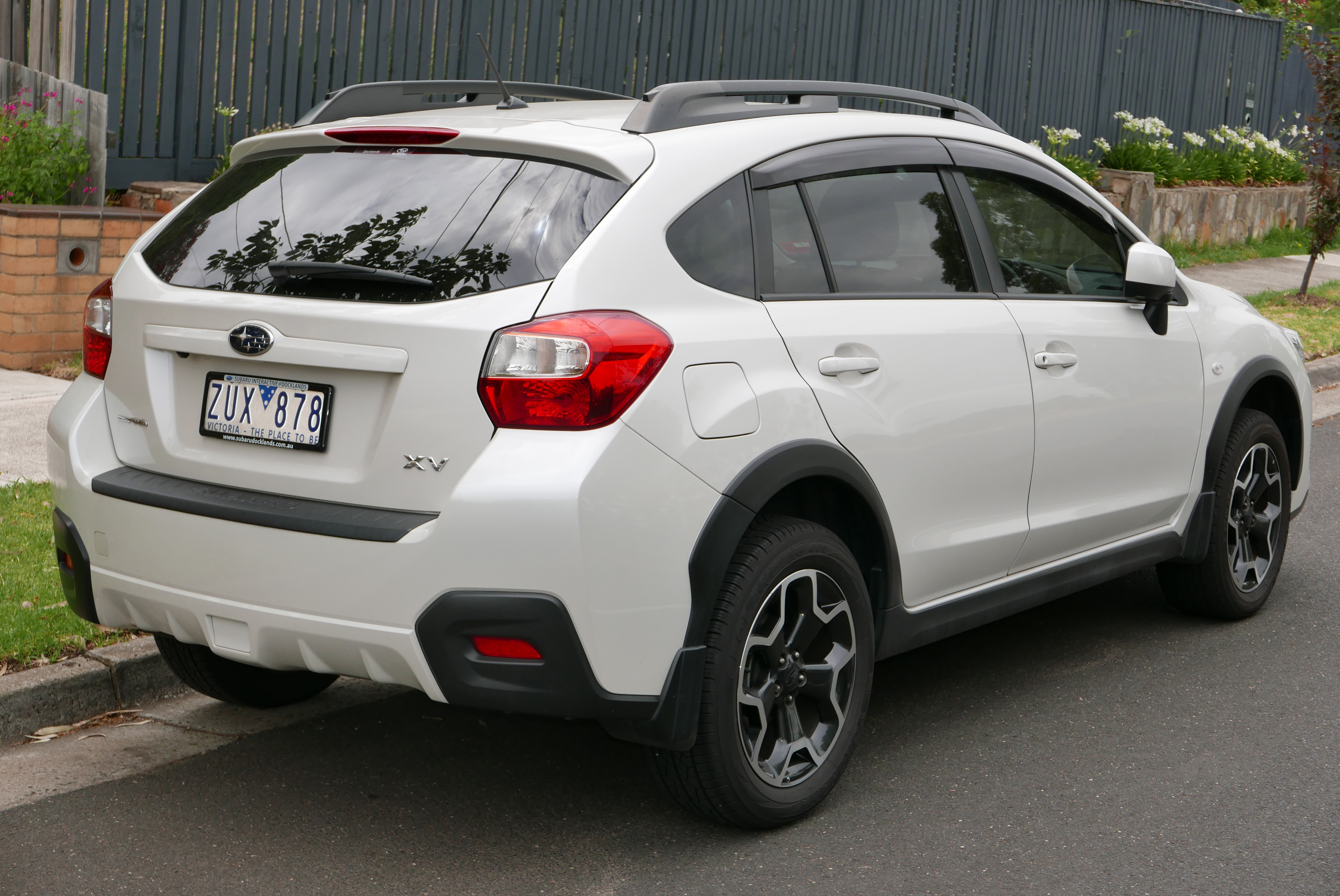
Rear (pre-facelift)

The production version of the XV was unveiled at the 2011 Frankfurt Motor Show. This model went on sale in Japan on 25 September 2012. It was introduced in the United States as the XV Crosstrek for the 2013 model year at the 2012 New York International Auto Show. It is powered by the FB20B engine making 148 hp (110 kW) (in the United States), sharing powertrain specifications with the Impreza. It included 17-inch wheels, as well as roof rails and tinted glass. All trims, along with all Subaru vehicles (excluding the BRZ), included Subaru's Symmetrical All-Wheel Drive system, with Lineartronic CVT equipped models being able to send 100% of torque to the wheels with the most traction. A 4.2 inch touchscreen and backup camera were included on the Limited trim, along with the all-weather package with heated seats. All trims had driver's auto up/down windows. All trims had six-way manual adjustment for the drivers seat (height, recline, forward/back), and four-way manual adjustment for the front passenger (forward/back, recline).

For the 2014 model year, a Hybrid version was released in the North American markets in two trims, the higher of which had new features with some of these being optional on the non-Hybrid Premium and Limited trims.

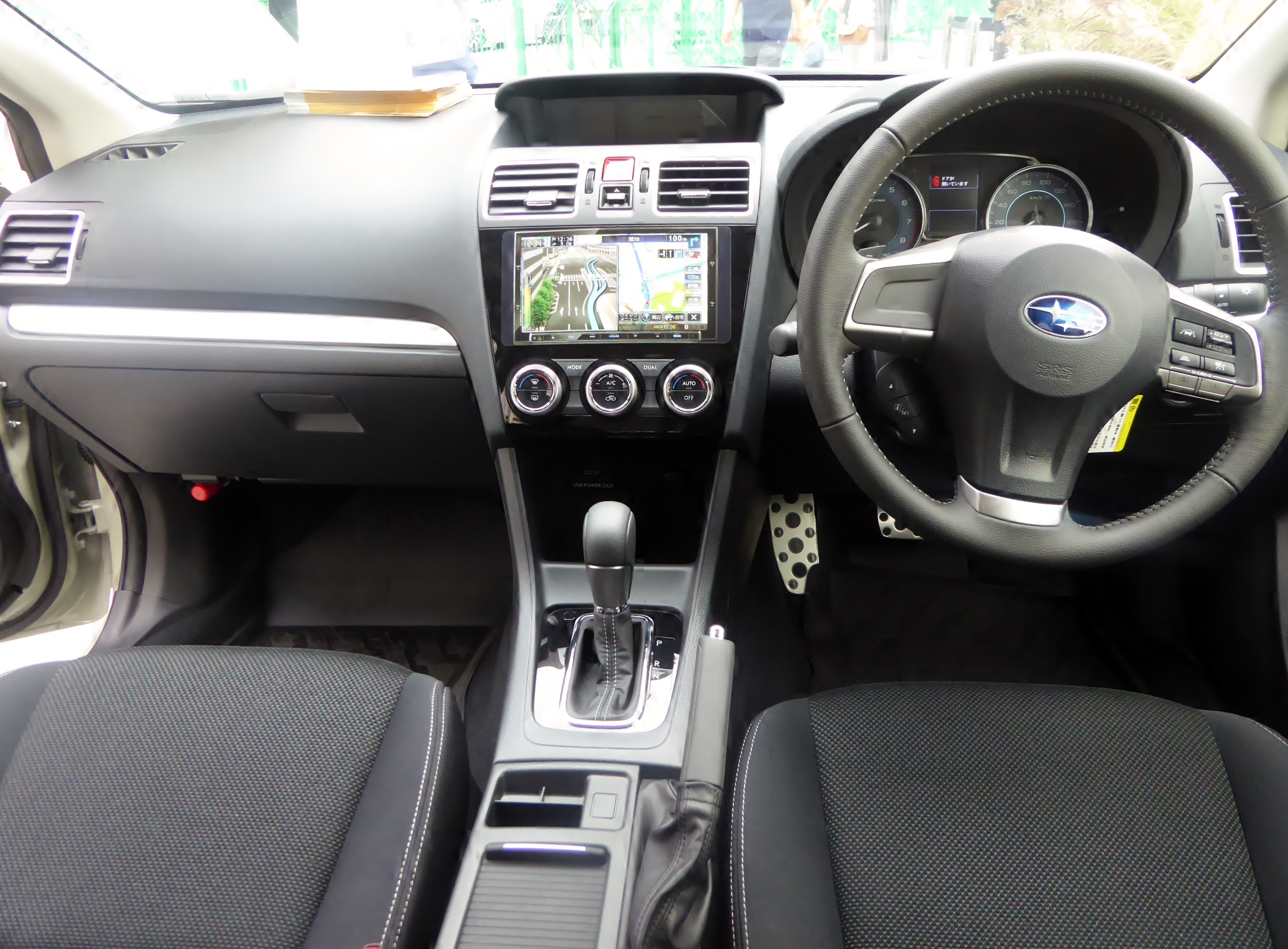
Interior

For the 2015 model year, reversing cameras and 6.2 inch head units were added to all trims, as well as an upgraded electric power steering system. The Limited trim got an insulation-glass windshield, optional keyless ignition, an upgraded instrument cluster which included a color Liquid-Crystal Display. Upgraded mirrors with welcome lighting and turn signals were added as well. The then-new Starlink multimedia plus system with a 7.0 inch display that debuted on the 2015 Subaru Legacy and Outback was included as well. The 2.0i Premium, 2.0i Limited and Hybrid trims could be optioned with Subaru EyeSight and Hybrid models gained a PIN code access system. A special edition variant based on the 2.0i Premium trim with Sunrise Yellow paint was also available, but limited to 1,000 units.

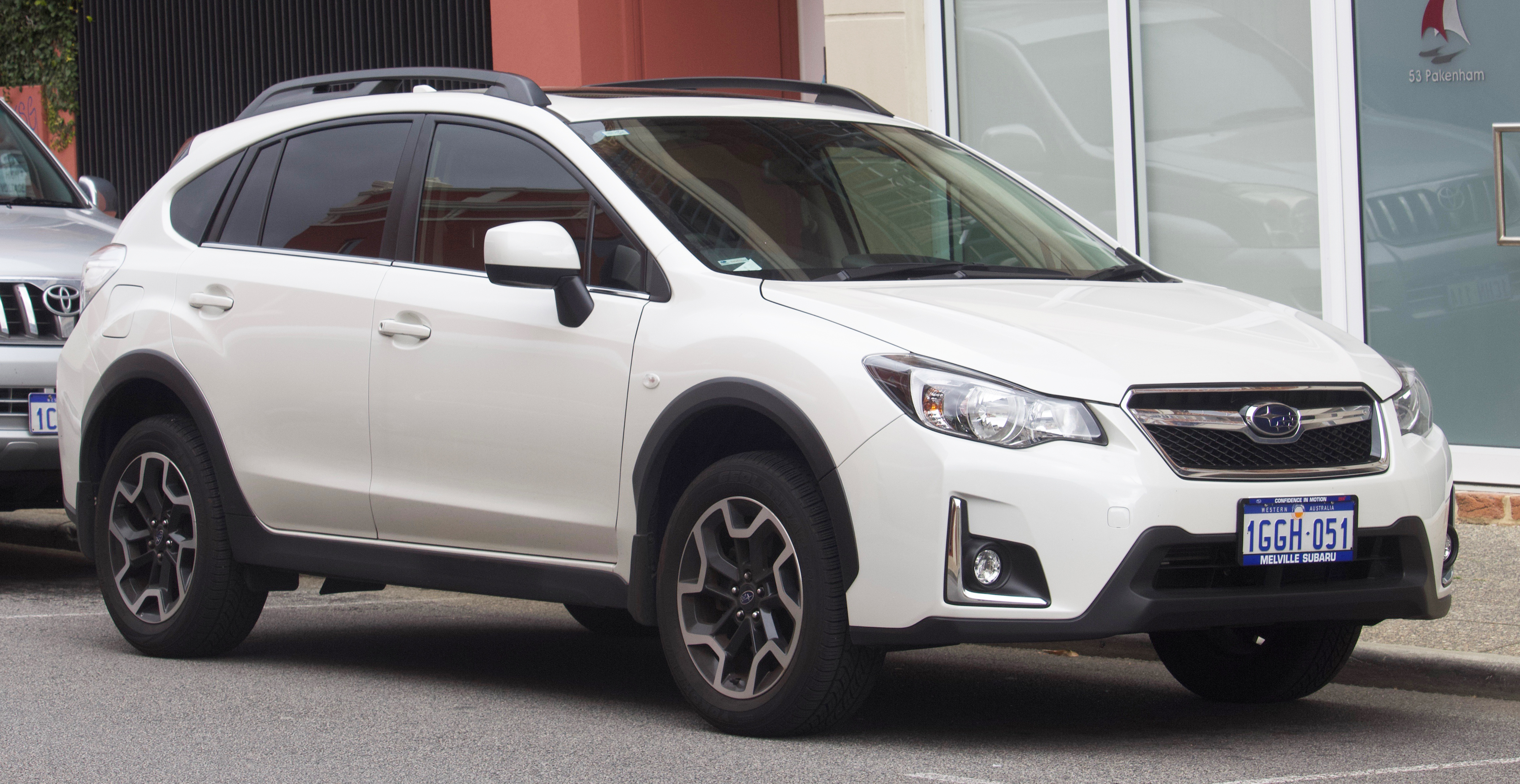

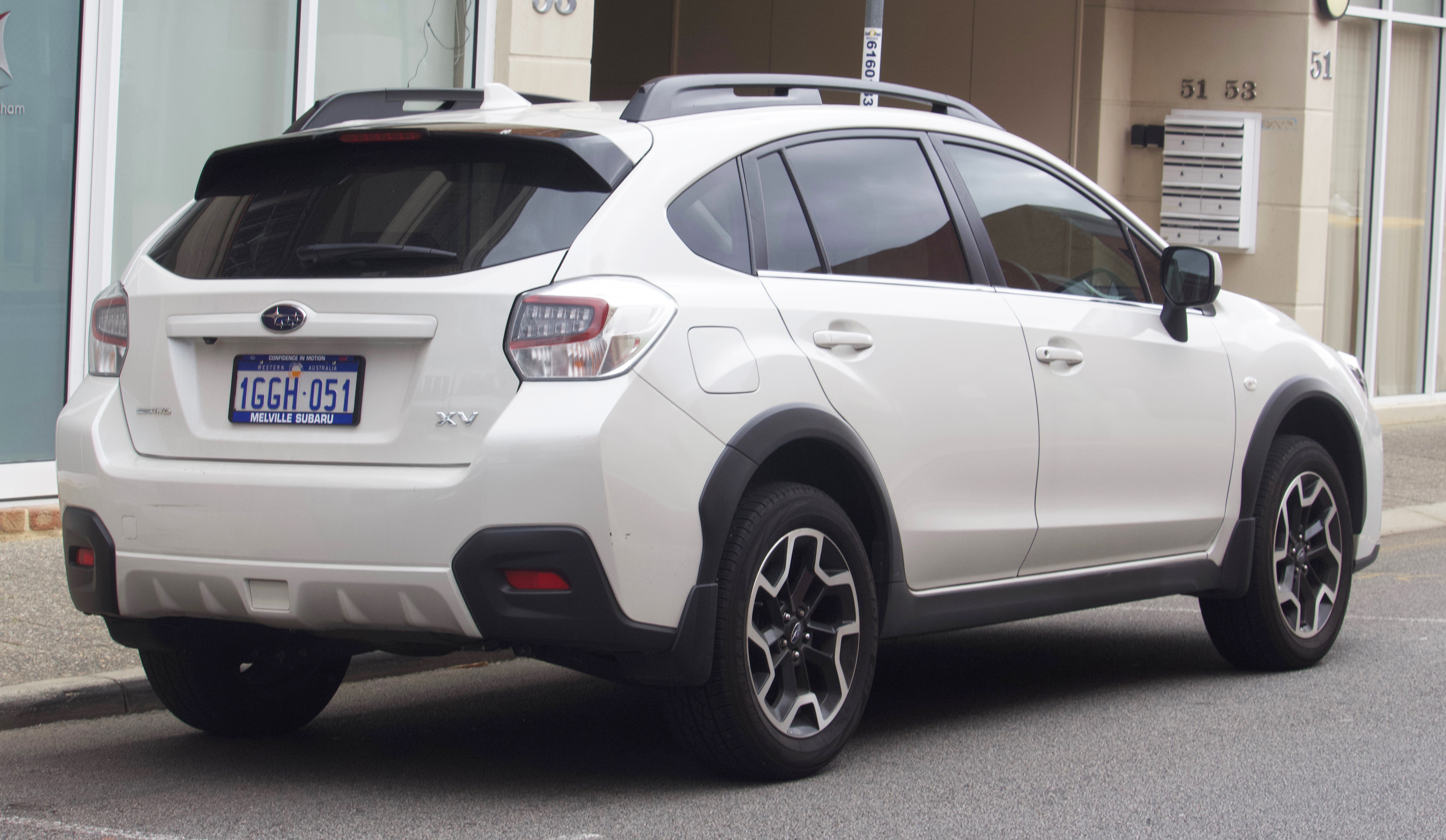
Facelift

For the 2016 model year, the Premium trim received the all weather package with two-level heated front seats and heated mirrors as standard equipment, along with the option of Subaru's Starlink Safety and Security system (standard on the Limited) including an SOS button, automatic collision notification system, stolen vehicle recovery, and a vehicle monitoring app. The Limited trim got rear cross-traffic alert, blind spot monitoring, and lane-change assist. This year also included revised styling and the removal of the XV prefix from the name in North America. It was also the last year of the Hybrid model.

The 2017 model was largely unchanged, with the only change being a new trim, which was the Platinum Special Edition (which could be considered an option package to the Premium trim). Included was special interior and exterior styling, a sunroof, keyless ignition and entry, and blind-spot monitoring with rear cross-traffic alert.

Despite being a lifted Subaru Impreza hatchback, sales have been much stronger in the US, due to sedan/hatchback sales slowing in the country.

==== Other markets ====
Malaysian production of the Subaru XV shipped as complete knock-down kits began at Tan Chong Motor Assemblies Sdn. Bhd (TCMA) in Malaysia in January 2013, with annual production of 5,000 units destined for sale in Malaysia, Thailand, and Indonesia, while the Philippine market Subaru XV are imported from Japan as a LHD (left-hand drive) configuration. Production at Tan Chong began on 20 December 2012.

Early European models include a choice of 1.6-liter gasoline, 2.0-liter gasoline, 2.0-liter diesel engines; five-speed manual (1.6-liter gasoline), six-speed manual (2.0 gasoline, 2.0 diesel), Lineartronic CVT (1.6 gasoline, 2.0 gasoline) transmission, and idle engine start stop (standard in gasoline engine models, optional in diesel engine models).

In North America, the XV was sold as the Subaru XV Crosstrek and was unveiled at the 2012 New York International Auto Show. The US model went on sale in 2012 as a 2013 model year vehicle. Early models include a 148-horsepower 2.0-liter boxer engine, five-speed manual or available second-generation Lineartronic CVT. In the United States starting with the 2016 model year, Subaru dropped the XV from its name and sold it as simply the Crosstrek. An updated model based on the fifth-generation Impreza became available in 2018.

=== Hybrid version ===
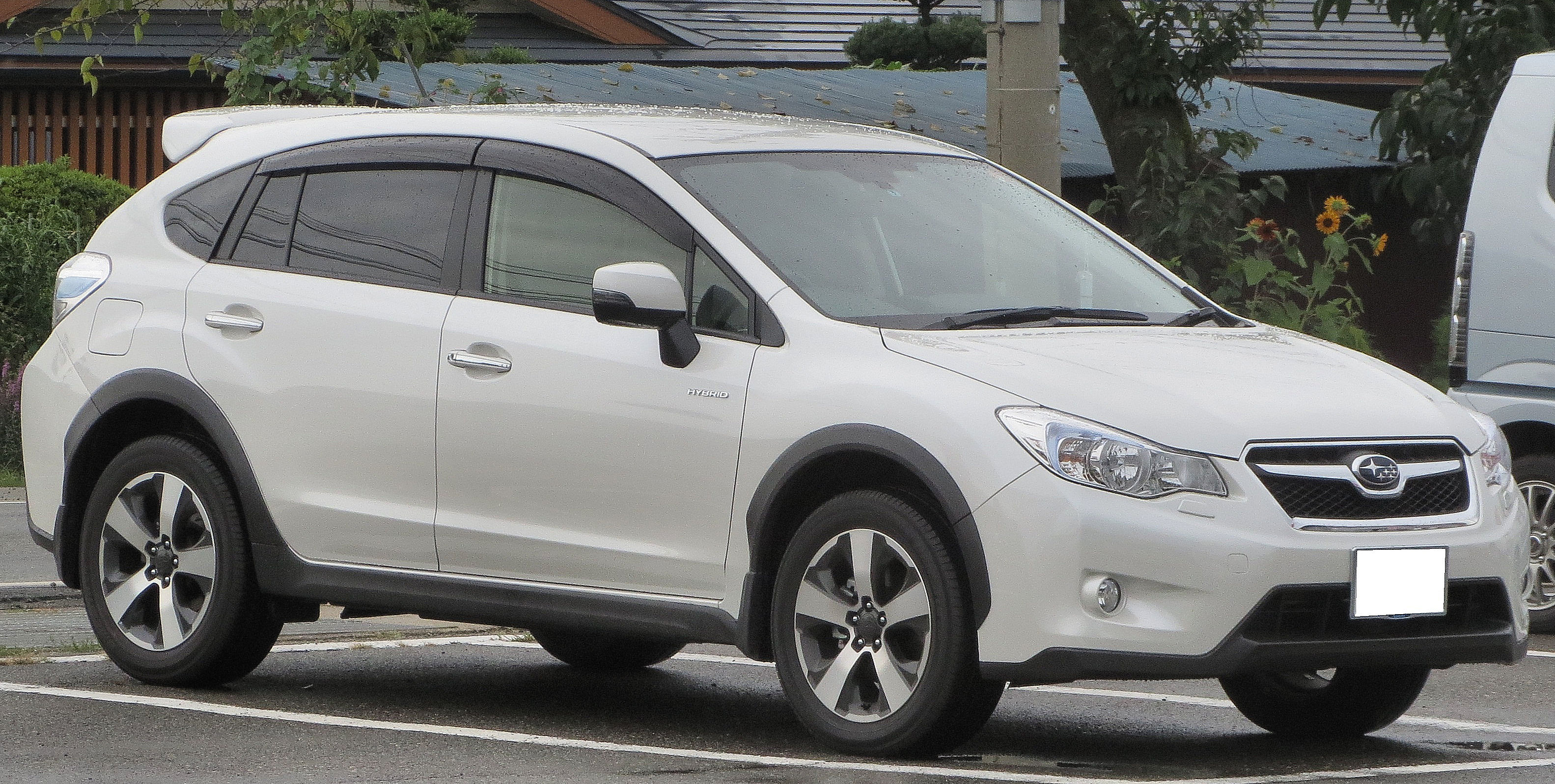
Subaru XV Hybrid (Japan)

The Subaru XV Crosstrek Hybrid (2013) is a version of the Subaru XV Crosstrek with permanent magnet AC synchronous motor rated 10 kW (14 PS; 13 hp) and 65 N⋅m (48 lb⋅ft), Lineartronic CVT, Nickel hydride batteries, and 225/55 R17 tires. Externally, "HYBRID" badges have been applied to the front doors and on the rear liftgate, and unique rear lights and wheels are exclusive to the hybrid version. The vehicle was Subaru's first production hybrid after a series of concepts stretching back to the 2003 B9 Scrambler, and was unveiled at the 2013 New York International Auto Show. Compared to the conventionally powered XV Crosstrek, a new gauge cluster and keyless start have been added to the hybrid, which gains approximately 300 pounds (140 kg) in weight. The 0.6 kW-hr battery (weighing 55 pounds (25 kg) by itself) takes the space previously occupied by the spare tire, minimizing the loss of cargo space. Using the battery alone, range is estimated at 1 mile (1.6 km) at 25 mph (40 km/h). The 10 kW generator-motor is built into the Lineartronic CVT, similar to the "turbo-parallel-hybrid" system first shown on the Subaru B5 TPH concept, and is intended to be used primarily for acceleration assistance and regenerative braking. Fuel consumption is improved by approximately 11%, from 28 mpg_{‑US} (8.4 L/100 km; 34 mpg_{‑imp}) (combined city/highway) to 31 miles per US gallon (7.6 L/100 km; 37 mpg_{‑imp}).

For the 2014 model year, the XV Crosstrek Hybrid was introduced in two trims, the XV Crosstrek Hybrid and Hybrid Touring. The base Hybrid model included the Limited's features, MPG of 29 city, 33 highway, removes the leather interior, and added different wheels, grille shutters, quick-ratio electric power-steering, side mirrors with signal repeaters, keyless ignition, chrome door handles, and an upgraded multi-function display, along with more power (up to 160 hp (119 kW) and 163 lb⋅ft (221 N⋅m) of torque). The Hybrid touring included a sunroof, leather, a navigation system with voice controls, Aha radio, HD radio, Satellite radio, and a 6.1 inch head unit. The Premium and Limited trims could be equipped with the upgraded head unit and a sunroof.

For 2015, Hybrid trims had their MPG increased to 30 city, 34 highway.

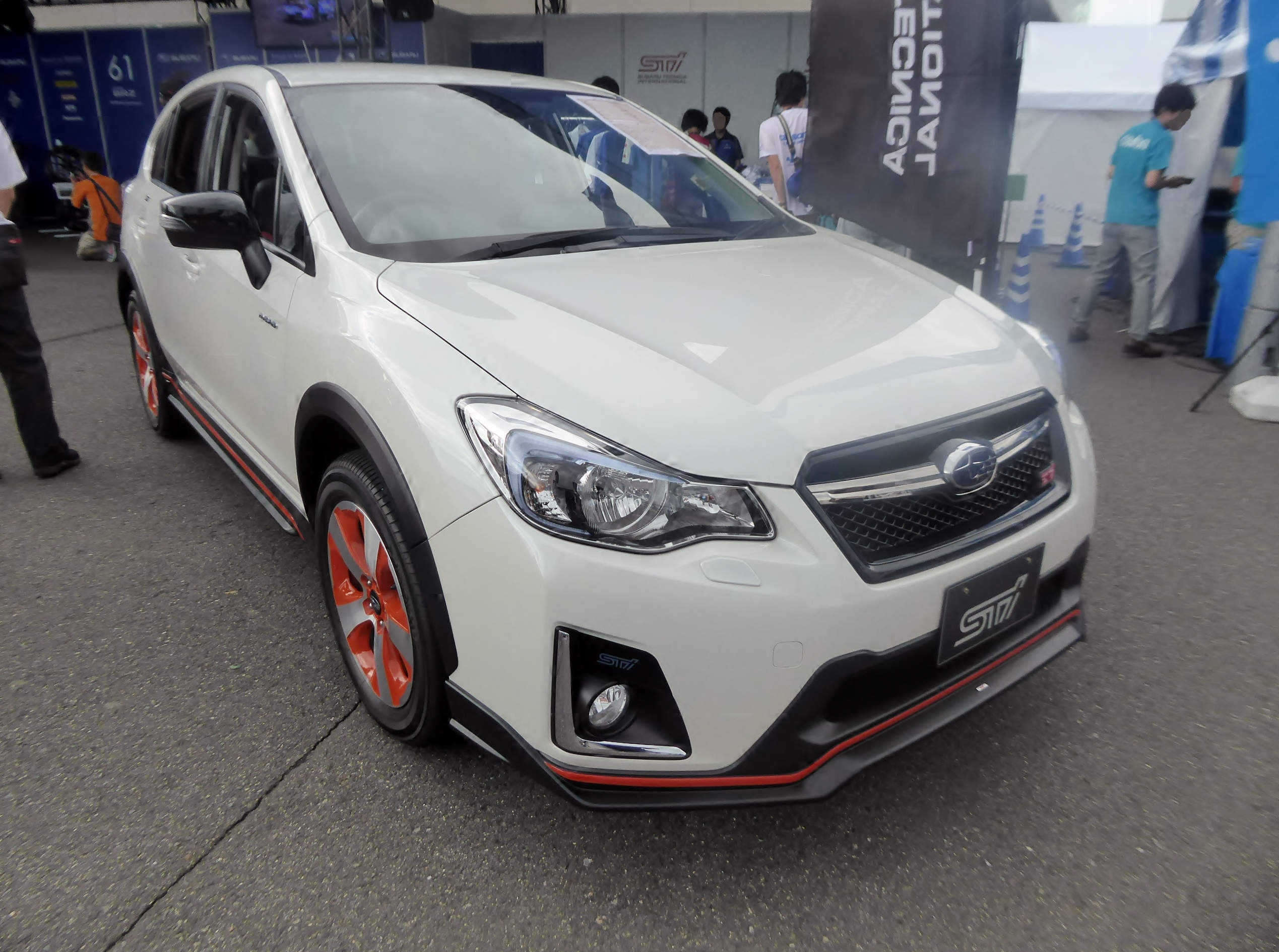
Subaru XV Hybrid tS

In 2016, after Subaru dropped the XV prefix from the model name in North America, the model was known as the Crosstrek Hybrid. In Japan, a STI version of the XV Hybrid was offered with the suspension tuned to provide better handling. Externally, the XV Hybrid tS ("tuned by STI") can be distinguished by orange accents on the front spoiler, side skirts, and roof spoiler. It was sold for a limited time spanning the last half of 2016.

The model was discontinued after the 2016 model year.

=== Safety ===
Euro NCAP test results* Subaru XV 2.0i (LHD) (2012)
Test	Points	%
Overall:	5 /5 stars	
Adult occupant:	30.9	86%
Child occupant:	44.2	90%
Pedestrian:	22.9	64%
Safety assist:	6	86%

IIHS scores (2013)
Moderate overlap front (original test)	Good
Side (original test)	Good
Roof strength	Good
Head restraints and seats	Good

ANCAP test results* Subaru XV (2012)
Test	Score
Overall	5 /5 stars
Frontal offset	14.33/16
Side impact	16/16
Pole	2/2
Seat belt reminders	3/3
Whiplash protection	Good
Pedestrian protection	Adequate
Electronic stability control	Standard

ASEAN NCAP test results Subaru XV (2013)
Test	Points	Stars
Adult occupant:	14.31	5 /5 stars
Child occupant:	67%	0 /5 stars
Safety assist:	NA	

== Second generation (GT; 2017) ==
Second generation
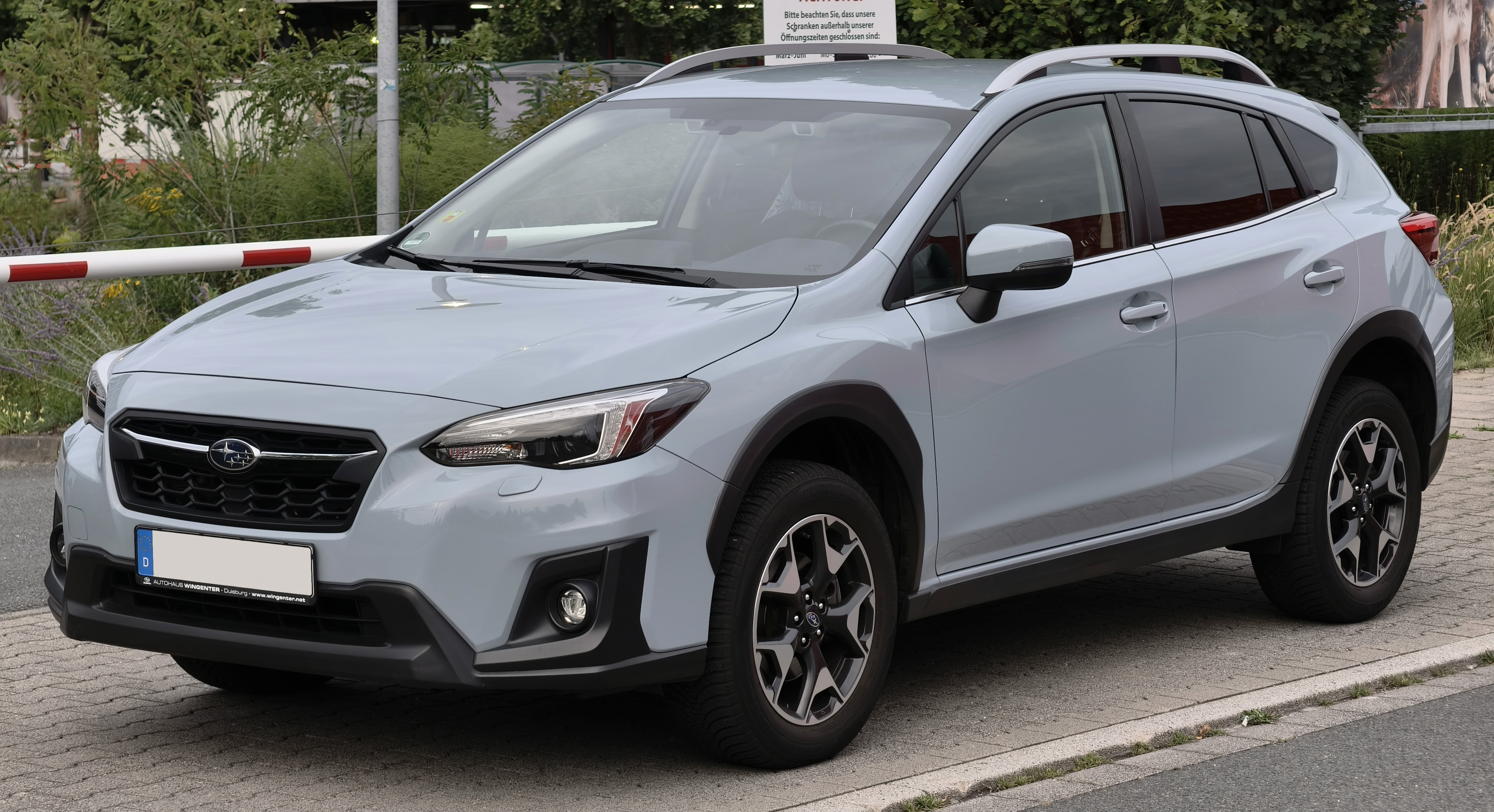
- Subaru XV (pre-facelift)

Overview
- Model code: GT
- Also called: Subaru XV
- Production: 2017–2023 (Note: Production for the Japanese market ended in 2022; global markets continued production until 2023.)
- Model years: 2018–2023 (North America)
- Assembly: Japan: Ōta, Gunma (Main Plant; Yajima Plant); Malaysia: Kuala Lumpur (TCMA)

Body and chassis
- Platform: Subaru Global Platform
- Related: Subaru Impreza (GK/GT); Subaru WRX (VB); Subaru Levorg/WRX wagon/WRX Sportswagon/WRX GT (VN)

Powertrain
- Engine: Gasoline: 1.6 L FB16 H4; 2.0 L FB20D H4; 2.5 L FB25D H4; Gasoline plug-in hybrid (PHEV): 2.0 L FB20V H4; Gasoline mild hybrid: 2.0 L FB20D e-Boxer H4
- Electric motor: 17 hp (17 PS; 13 kW) Electric motor in transmission (e-BOXER); 118 hp (120 PS; 88 kW) Permanent-magnet synchronous AC motor (Hybrid)
- Transmission: Lineartronic CVT; 6-speed manual (North America); Hybrid Lineartronic™ CVT
- Hybrid drivetrain: MHEV (Crosstrek/XV e-BOXER); PHEV (Crosstrek/XV Plug-in Hybrid)
- Battery: 48V Li-ion (MHEV); 8.8 kWh Li-ion (PHEV)

Dimensions
- Wheelbase: 2,670 mm (105.1 in)
- Length: 4,465 mm (175.8 in)
- Width: 1,800 mm (70.9 in)
- Height: 1,615 mm (63.6 in)

The second-generation Subaru XV ("Crosstrek" for the North American market) was unveiled at the Geneva International Motor Show in March 2017. Like the Impreza, the XV/Crosstrek has moved to the Subaru Global Platform. Minimum ground clearance is 220 mm (8.7 in) and matte black cladding has been added to each side to add a "rugged flavor", creating "a dynamic form expressing all the enjoyment to be expected from a crossover vehicle". During its first full month of sales, the XV sold 11,085 vehicles in Japan.

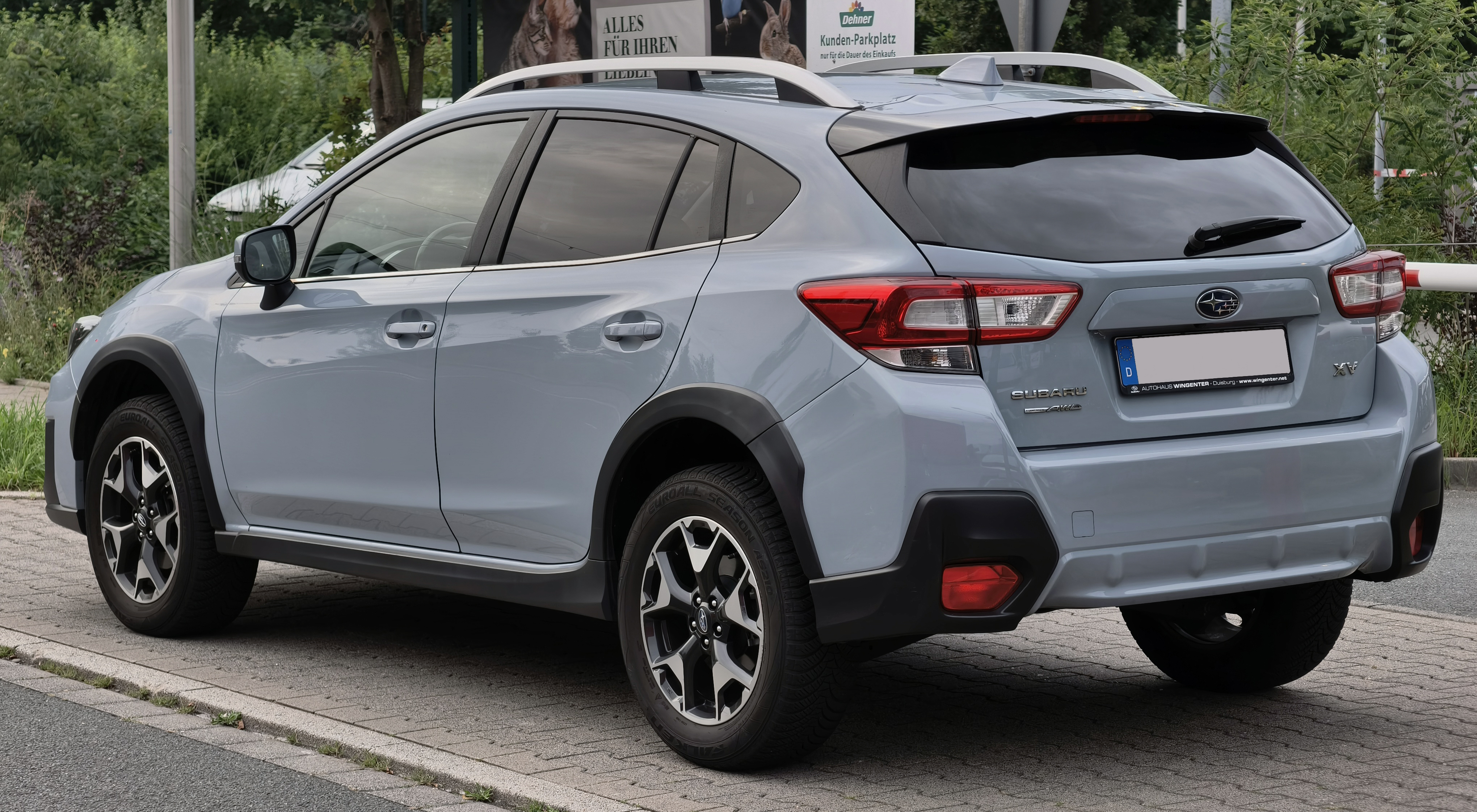
Rear

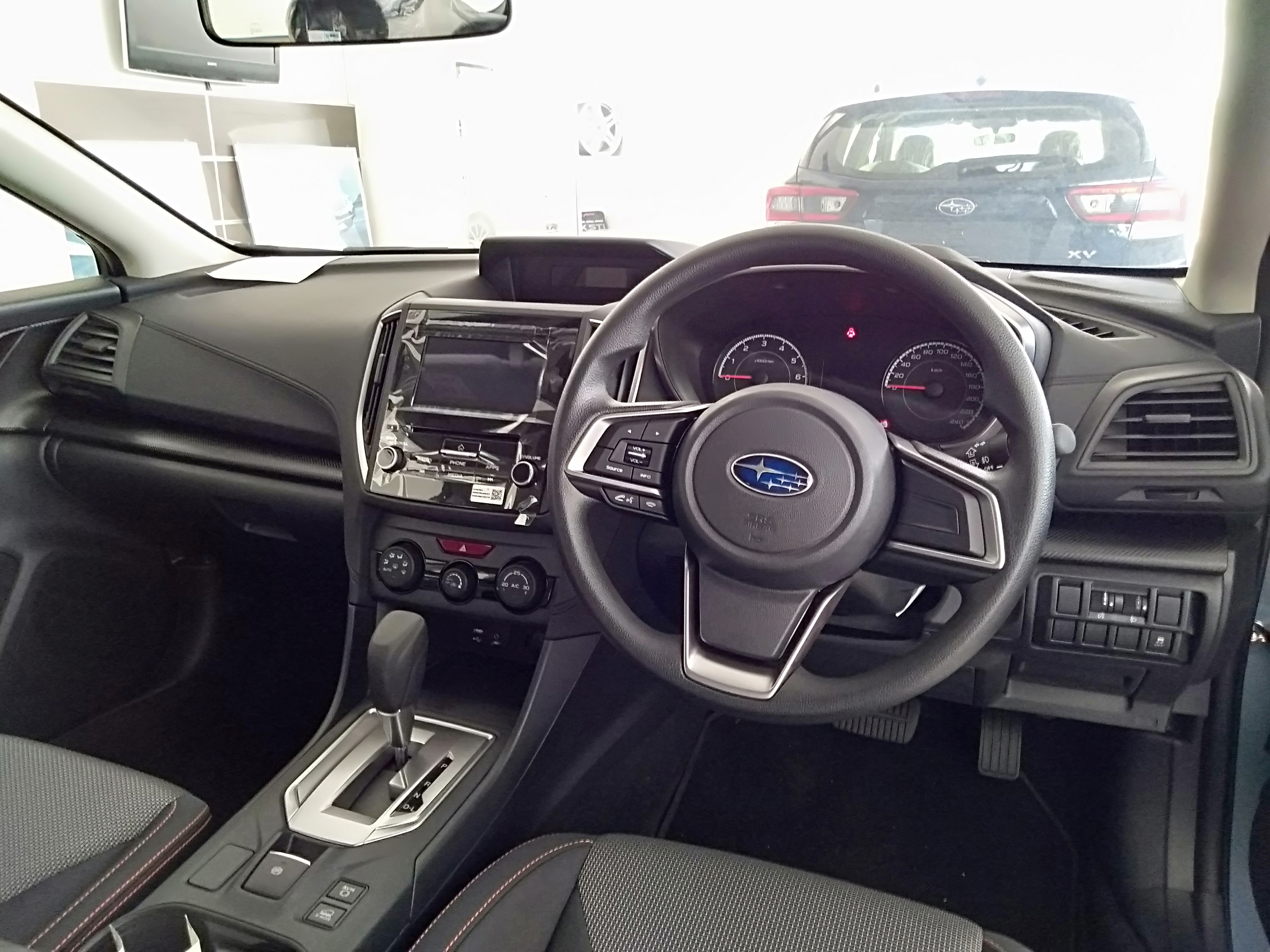
Interior

=== North America ===
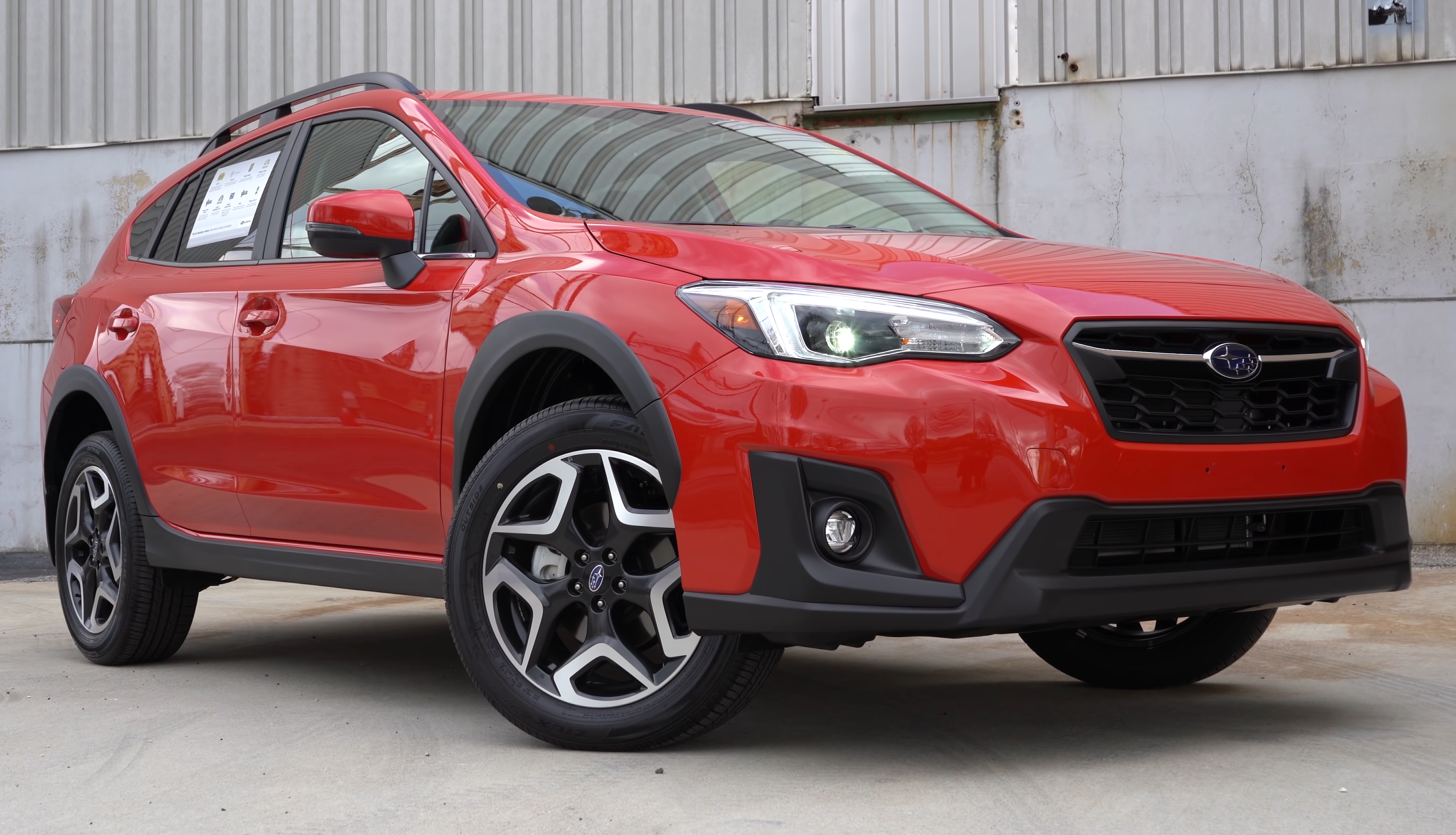
2020 Subaru Crosstrek (US)

The second-generation Crosstrek in North America uses the revised direct-injection FB20D gasoline engine with 152 hp (154 PS; 113 kW) and 196 N⋅m (20 kg⋅m; 145 lb⋅ft) output. The base transmission was changed to a 6-speed manual transmission as opposed to the 5-speed in the first generation. The interior quality was upgraded, and a new 6.5-inch Subaru Starlink infotainment system with Apple CarPlay and Android Auto functionality was standard, with an 8.0 inch system and navigation being available on the 2.0i Limited trim. While navigation was an option, all trims could use Apple Maps, Google Maps (via CarPlay and Android Auto respectively). Magellan Navigation is also available on all trims via the Starlink app, though the optional navigation is the only system that does not use the driver's smartphone to get map data, and is the only system that displays speed limits in the gauge cluster. Auto up/down windows were for the first time included for the passenger side (previously only on the driver's side). The Starlink Safety and Security system was made standard on the 2.0i Premium trim. Models optioned with Eyesight got adaptive high beams. The 2.0i Limited trim got adaptive LED headlights, keyless ignition and entry, an optional Harman Kardon was available and a 6-way power driver's seat was included. Subaru's X-MODE off-road assist function was also added.

For 2019, the Crosstrek received Eyesight on all models equipped with the CVT transmission. The Hybrid trim was reintroduced as a Plug-in Hybrid, based on the Toyota Prius Prime's Hybrid system. Power was reduced to 148 hp (150 PS; 110 kW), and combined MPG was increased to 35 mpg_{‑US} (6.7 L/100 km; 42 mpg_{‑imp}). Subaru claimed a range of 17 miles (27 km) for all-electric driving.

For 2020, the Crosstrek received Subaru's SI-Drive powertrain management system, first available on the Subaru Forester and Subaru WRX models with a CVT. An auto start-stop system was added, along with an optional 6-way power driver's seat being added to the Premium trim. The 2.0i prefix was dropped from all existing trim names. All models had USB and AUX ports moved from the center console to the console storage tray, which received lighting on the Premium and Limited trim. The Limited and Hybrid trims got rear seat USB ports. New is an automatic door locking and unlocking system with automatic unlocking in a collision. The EyeSight system now features lane centering.

=== Crosstrek Hybrid ===
In May 2018, Subaru of America announced a plug-in hybrid electric version for the 2019 model year to serve as a Compliance car, and thus is sold only in states that follow California emission standards. It has three different modes: full-electric (traction motor drawing from battery power), parallel hybrid (traction motor assisting gasoline engine), or series hybrid (motor-generator unit driven from gasoline engine). The Crosstrek Hybrid features the FB20 gasoline engine detuned to 137 hp (139 PS; 102 kW), coupled with two electric motors developing a combined 148 hp (150 PS; 110 kW). The car has a fuel tank of 13.2 US gallons (50 L; 11.0 imp gal) and an 8.8 kWh (32 MJ) battery, which together enable a range of 480 miles (770 km). The two electric motors have separate functions: Motor Generator One is the starter and acts as a generator under regenerative braking; Motor Generator Two is the traction motor with an output of 118 hp (120 PS; 88 kW) and 149 lb⋅ft (202 N⋅m; 21 kg⋅m); together, the two motors and battery pack add approximately 455 pounds (206 kg) to the curb weight of the car. Under electric power only, the Crosstrek Hybrid can achieve 17 miles (27 km) of range at speeds up to 65 mph (105 km/h).

=== XV e-BOXER ===
Subaru introduced the e-BOXER hybrid powertrain for the European-market Forester and XV at Geneva in March 2019; the e-BOXER integrates an electric motor into the Lineartronic continuously-variable transmission to improve fuel economy and increase power. The battery for the traction motor is placed above the rear axle, improving the front/rear weight balance. The e-BOXER powertrain features a modified FB20 rated at 110 kW (148 hp; 150 PS), but compared to the US-market Crosstrek Hybrid, the XV e-BOXER uses a single electric motor rated at 12.3 kW (16 hp; 17 PS) maximum output.

=== Facelift ===
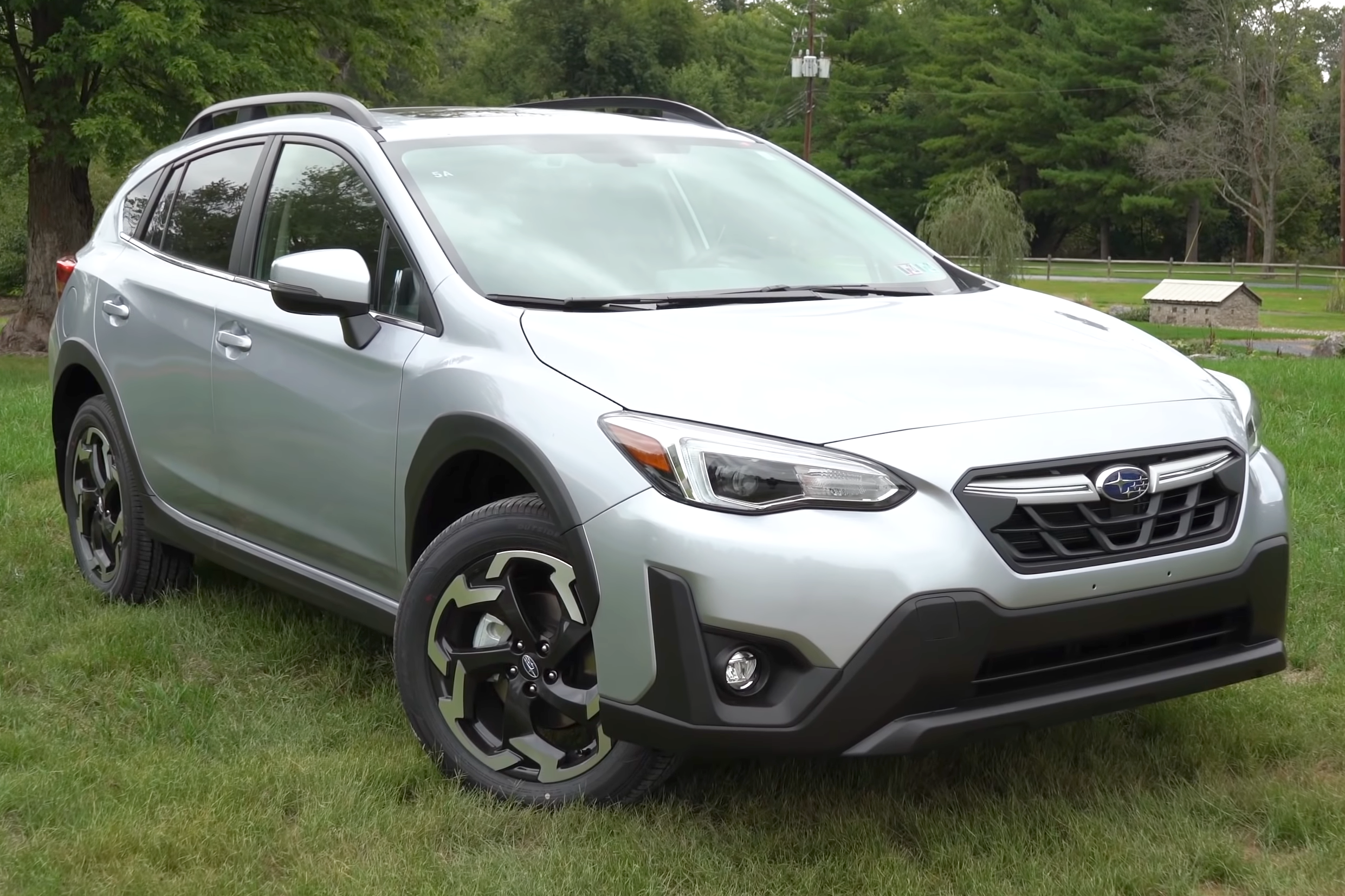
2021 Subaru Crosstrek (US)

Starting in the middle of 2020, for the 2021 model year, Subaru began selling the Crosstrek with changes that include aesthetic tweaks, a new trim level, more driver assistance technology, and a new 2.5-liter engine option. The most obvious exterior styling change is larger front lower bumper cladding in black plastic. The new Sport trim level, above Premium and below the top spec Limited, will bring with it Subaru's dual X-Mode traction control with Snow/Dirt and Deep Snow/Mud terrain options. On the Canadian market, the Sport is known as the Outdoor. The Sport trim will also get a unique interior with a Sport logo plus yellow stitching. Limited trim vehicles will get a leather interior with orange stitching. For driver aids, any CVT-equipped Crosstrek can get adaptive cruise control and lane centering. Top-of-the-line Limited models will receive blind-spot detection with lane-change assist plus cross-traffic alert, reverse automated emergency braking, and high-beam assist. For the first time, the Crosstrek offers a 2.5-liter FB25D as an engine option, and it is only available with the CVT transmission on the Sport and Limited trim levels. The new engine offering makes 182 hp (185 PS; 136 kW) and 176 lb⋅ft (239 N⋅m; 24.3 kg⋅m) of torque.

For the 2023 model year, a new Special Edition package was introduced for the Premium trim, marking the return of the Desert Khaki color option offered in the previous generation. It is fitted with a custom black and red interior with red stitching and leather accents. As with the previous generation, the Special Edition was limited to 1,000 units, and all models were only available with the CVT transmission.

=== Safety ===
Euro NCAP test results* Subaru XV 2.0i-S EyeSight (LHD) (2017)
Test	Points	%
Overall:	5 /5 stars	
Adult occupant:	35.8	94%
Child occupant:	44.	89%
Pedestrian:	35.4	84%
Safety assist:	8.3	68%

IIHS scores (2018)
Small overlap front (driver)	Good			
Small overlap front (passenger)	Good			
Moderate overlap front (original test)	Good			
Side (original test)	Good			
Side (updated test)	Poor			
Roof strength	Good			
Head restraints and seats	Good			
Headlights	Good	Poor	Acceptable	Marginal
Front crash prevention: vehicle-to-vehicle	Superior			
Child seat anchors (LATCH) ease of use	Good+			

ANCAP test results* Subaru XV (2017)
Test	Score
Overall	5 /5 stars
Frontal offset	14.80/16
Side impact	16/16
Pole	2/2
Seat belt reminders	3/3
Whiplash protection	Good
Pedestrian protection	Good
Electronic stability control	Standard

== Third generation (GU; 2022) ==
Third generation
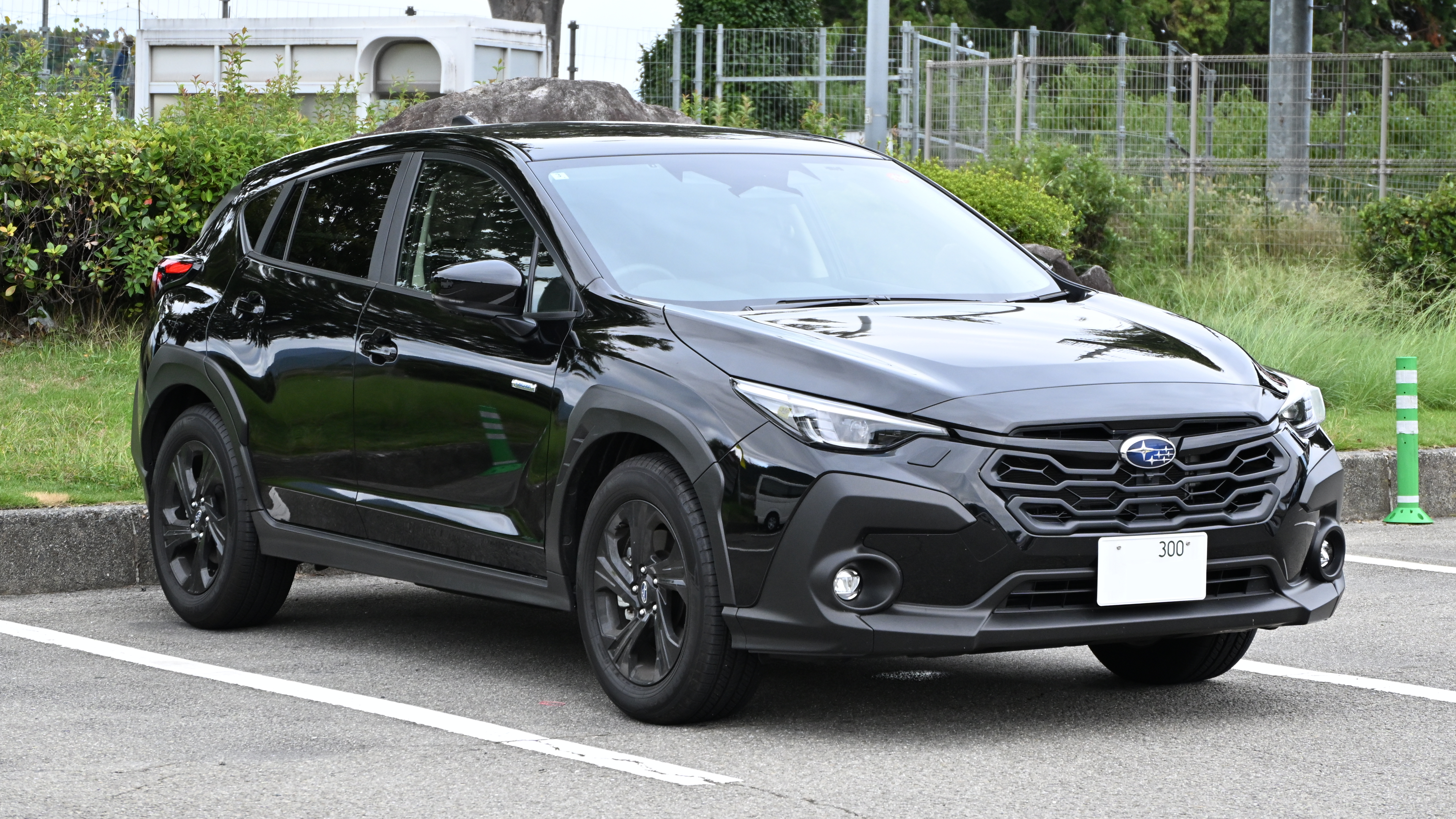

Overview
- Model code: GU
- Production: 2022–present
- Model years: 2024–present (North America)
- Assembly: Japan: Ōta, Gunma; United States: Lafayette, Indiana (SIA; since May 2023)

Body and chassis
- Platform: Subaru Global Platform
- Related: Subaru Impreza (GU); Subaru WRX (VB); Subaru Levorg/WRX wagon/WRX Sportswagon/WRX GT (VN)

Powertrain
- Engine: Gasoline: 2.0 L FB20D H4; 2.5 L FB25D H4; Gasoline hybrid/mild hybrid: 2.0 L FB20D e-Boxer H4; 2.5 L FB25D S:HEV H4
- Electric motor: 13 hp (13 PS; 10 kW) Permanent magnet AC synchronous (e-Boxer); 118 hp (120 PS; 88 kW) Toyota AC Synchronous Motor (S:HEV/Hybrid)
- Power output: List: 2.0 AWD Lineartronic: 113 kW (152 hp; 154 PS); 2.5 AWD Lineartronic: 136 kW (182 hp; 185 PS); 2.0ie Mild Hybrid AWD Lineartronic: 110 kW (148 hp; 150 PS) (gasoline engine only); 123 kW (165 hp; 167 PS) (combined system output); 2.5 S:HEV AWD Lineartronic: 117 kW (157 hp; 159 PS) (gasoline engine only); 88 kW (118 hp; 120 PS) (electric motor only); 145 kW (194 hp; 197 PS) (combined system output)
- Transmission: Lineartronic CVT; eCVT (S:HEV/Hybrid)
- Hybrid drivetrain: MHEV (e-Boxer); Power-split (S:HEV/Hybrid)
- Battery: 13.5 kw/118.4V/4.8Ah lithium-ion (e-Boxer); 8.8/5.5 (total/usable) kWh 351.5 V PHEV; 1.1 kWh Lithium-ion (S:HEV/Hybrid)

Dimensions
- Wheelbase: 2,670 mm (105.1 in)
- Length: 4,480 mm (176.4 in)
- Width: 1,800 mm (70.9 in)
- Height: 1,575–1,580 mm (62.0–62.2 in)
- Curb weight: 1,540–1,620 kg (3,395–3,571 lb)

The third-generation Crosstrek was revealed in Japan on September 15, 2022, while being based on the outgoing model. It went on sale in Japan in December 2022, being available with a cheaper front-wheel drive option. The third-generation is also the first to use the Crosstrek nameplate globally; previous generations marketed outside North America used the XV nameplate.

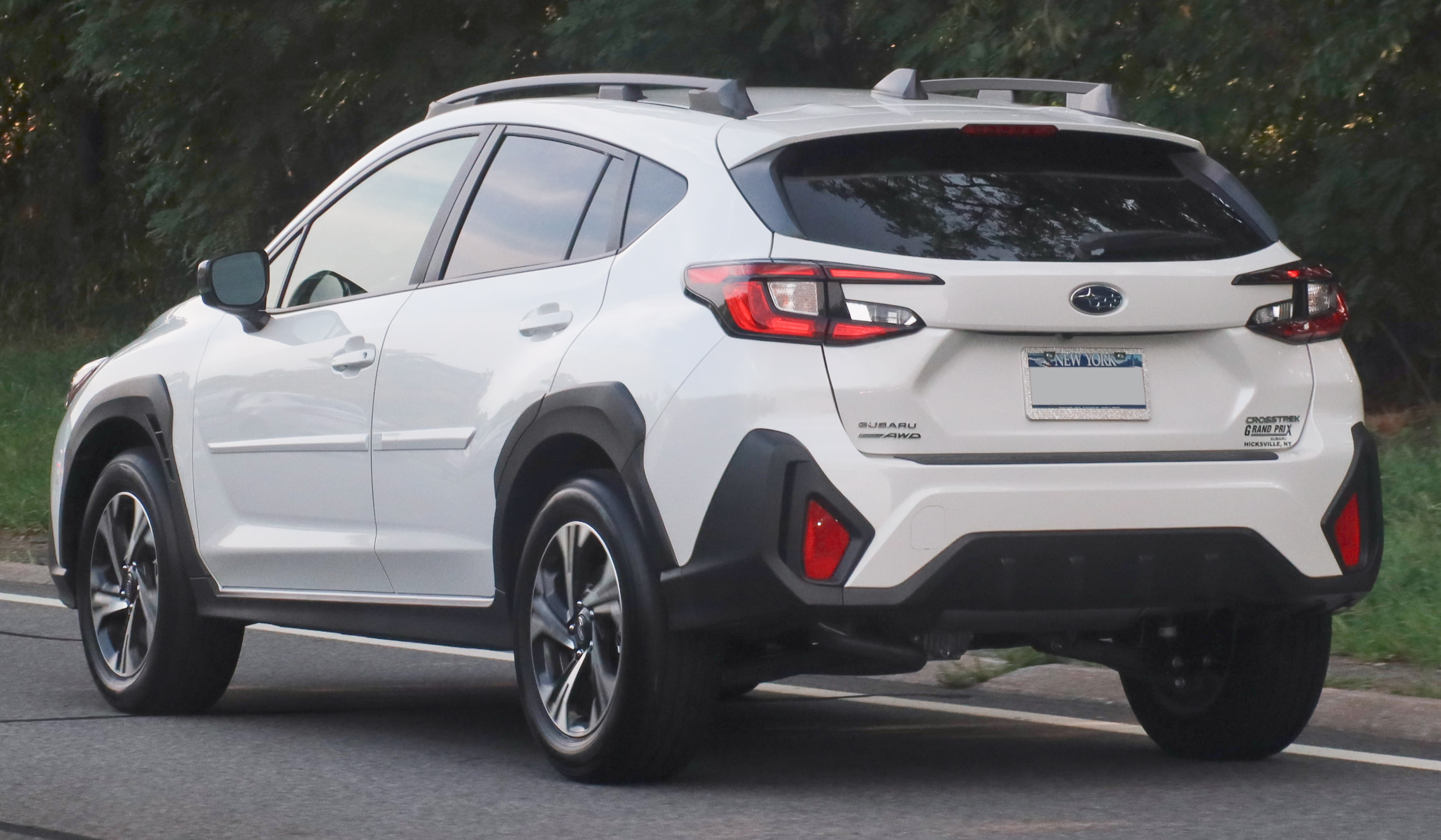
Rear view

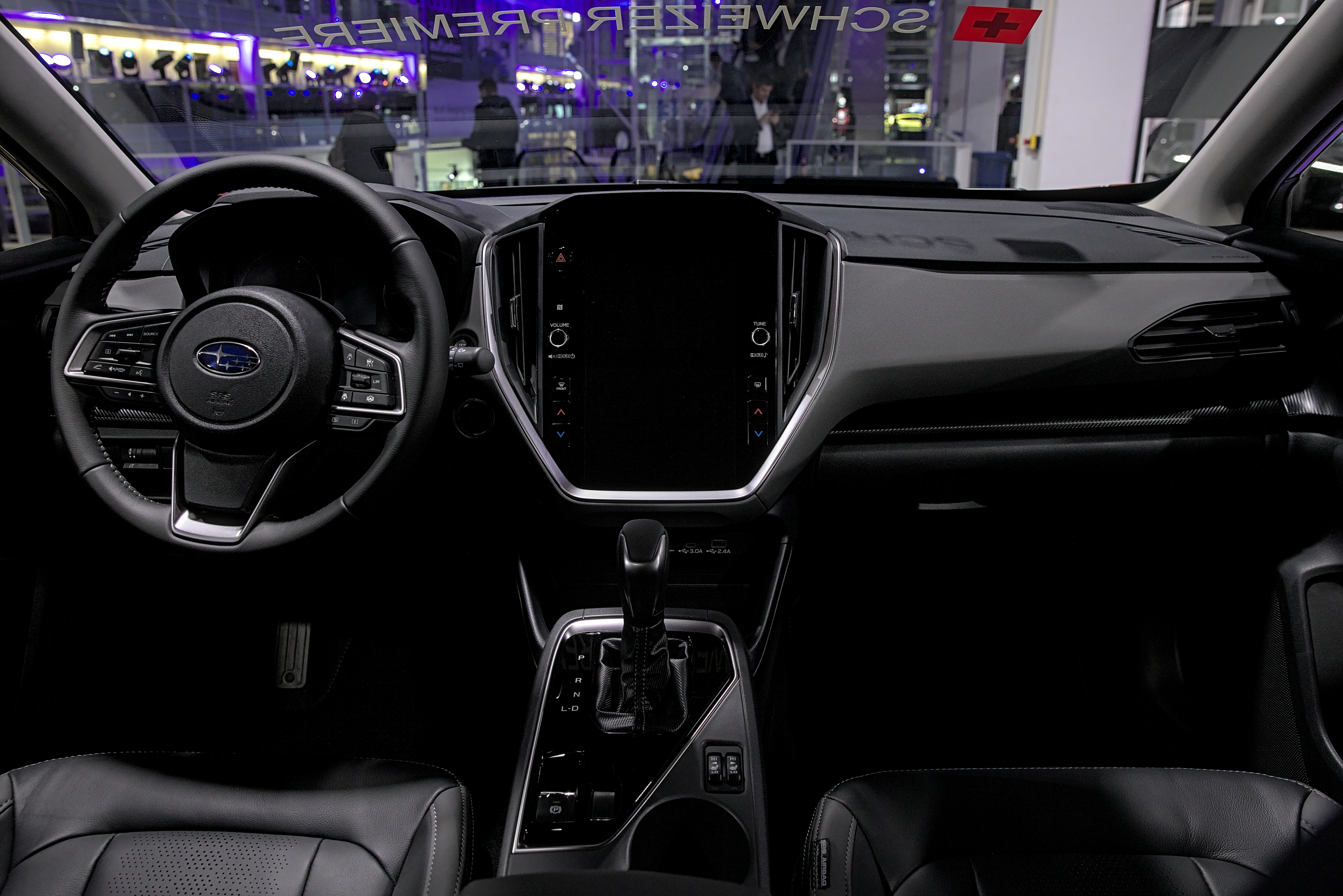
Interior

=== North America ===
The third-generation Crosstrek for the North American market debuted at the Chicago Auto Show on February 9, 2023. The 2.0-liter FB20D and 2.5-liter FB25D engines were carried over from the previous generation, and the manual transmission was discontinued. The torque for the FB25D engine was increased to 178 lb⋅ft (241 N⋅m; 24.6 kg⋅m). For the first time, the 2.5-liter Crosstrek Sport and Limited are produced in the United States at Subaru of Indiana Automotive, Inc. in Lafayette, Indiana. Production for the 2.5-liter models began on May 17, 2023. The 2.0-liter Base and Premium trims continued to be produced in Japan. The 2.5-liter Onyx and Limited trim levels for the Canadian market are sourced from Japan. With the exception of the Wilderness trim, Crosstrek models produced in the United States are not exported to Canada.

For the 2025 model year, the 2.5-liter FB25D became the standard engine for the Premium trim, replacing the 2.0-liter FB20D. Additionally, it received the dual-function X-MODE that was previously only available on the Sport, Limited, and Wilderness trims. While the 2.5-liter Sport, Limited, and Wilderness trims are still produced in the United States, the 2.5-liter Premium trim continued to be produced in Japan alongside the Base trim, which remained unchanged from the previous model year.

For the 2026 model year, the 2.0-liter FB20D was dropped from the Base trim, making the 2.5-liter FB25D the standard engine across all trim levels. Additionally, the FB25D engine's power was decreased from 182 hp (185 PS; 136 kW) to 180 hp (182 PS; 134 kW), and the torque remained unchanged. The Alpine Green color option also became available across all trim levels; it was previously exclusive to the Sport, Limited, and Wilderness trims. For the U.S. market, all non-Hybrid Crosstrek models are produced in the United States at SIA, while the Crosstrek Hybrid is produced in Japan.

For the 2027 model year, the gas-powered Sport trim was discontinued. Additionally, the Pure Red and Lithium Red Pearl color options were replaced with Ignition Red, and Alpine Green was replaced with Tidepool Teal Pearl.

==== Crosstrek Wilderness ====
On April 5, 2023, Subaru revealed the Crosstrek Wilderness at the New York Auto Show. It is a more off-road-oriented variant of the Crosstrek, and the third vehicle to be launched under Subaru's "Wilderness" brand. The suspension is raised to 9.3 inches (240 mm), which is 0.6 inches (15 mm) more than the standard Crosstrek's 8.7 inches (220 mm) of ground clearance. The roof rack is rated for 700 pounds (320 kg). The Crosstrek Wilderness uses the same 2.5-liter FB25D from the Sport and Limited trims and features a higher final drive ratio of 4.11 compared to the standard 3.7. The CVT transmission was retuned for better low-speed performance, and with the addition of a CVT cooler, it can tow up to 3,500 pounds (1,600 kg). Like the 2.5-liter Sport and Limited trim levels, the Wilderness is also produced in the United States at SIA.

For the 2026 model year, the Wilderness trim was discontinued for the Canadian market due to counter-tariffs imposed on U.S.-made products.

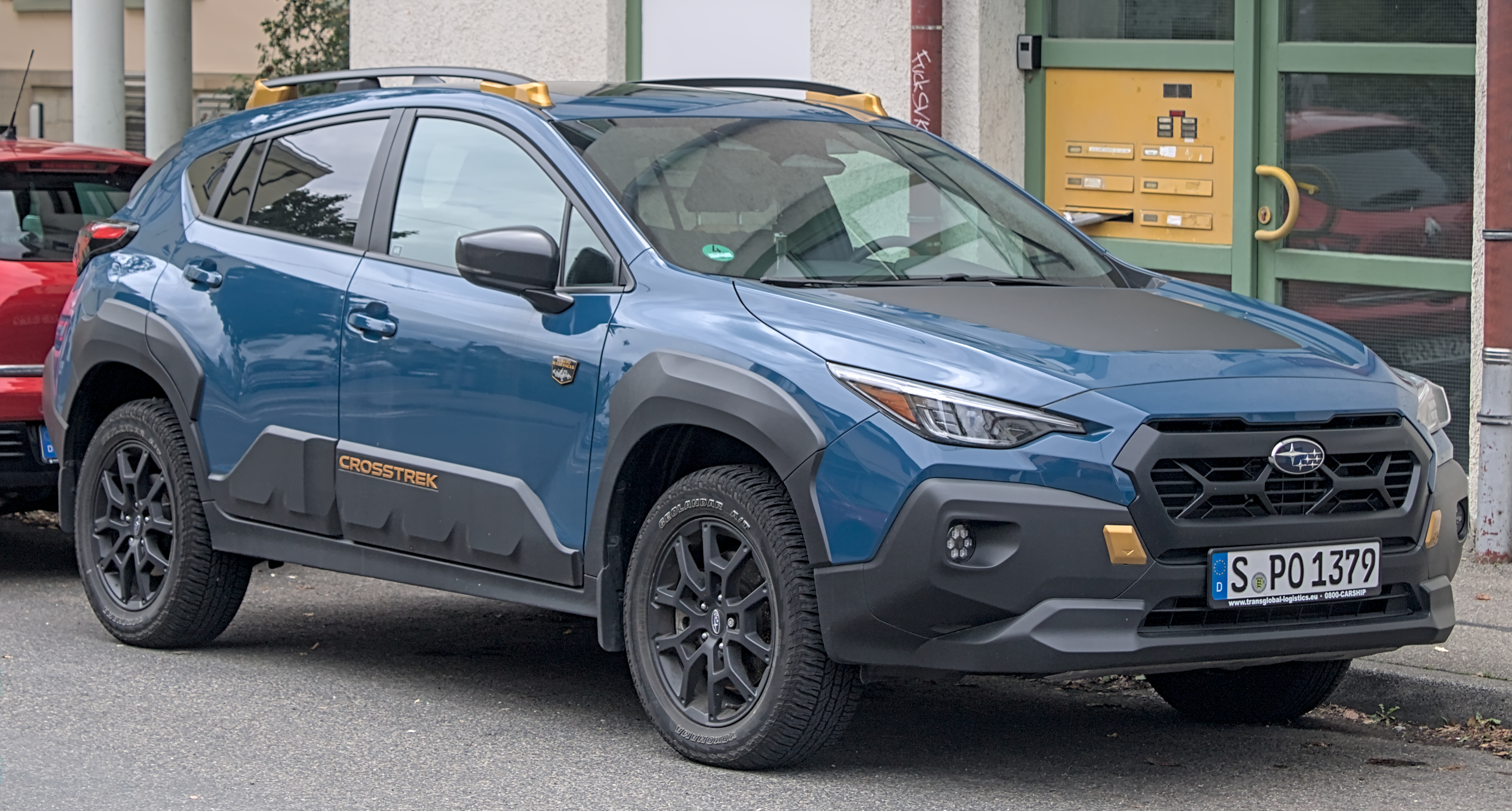
Crosstrek Wilderness

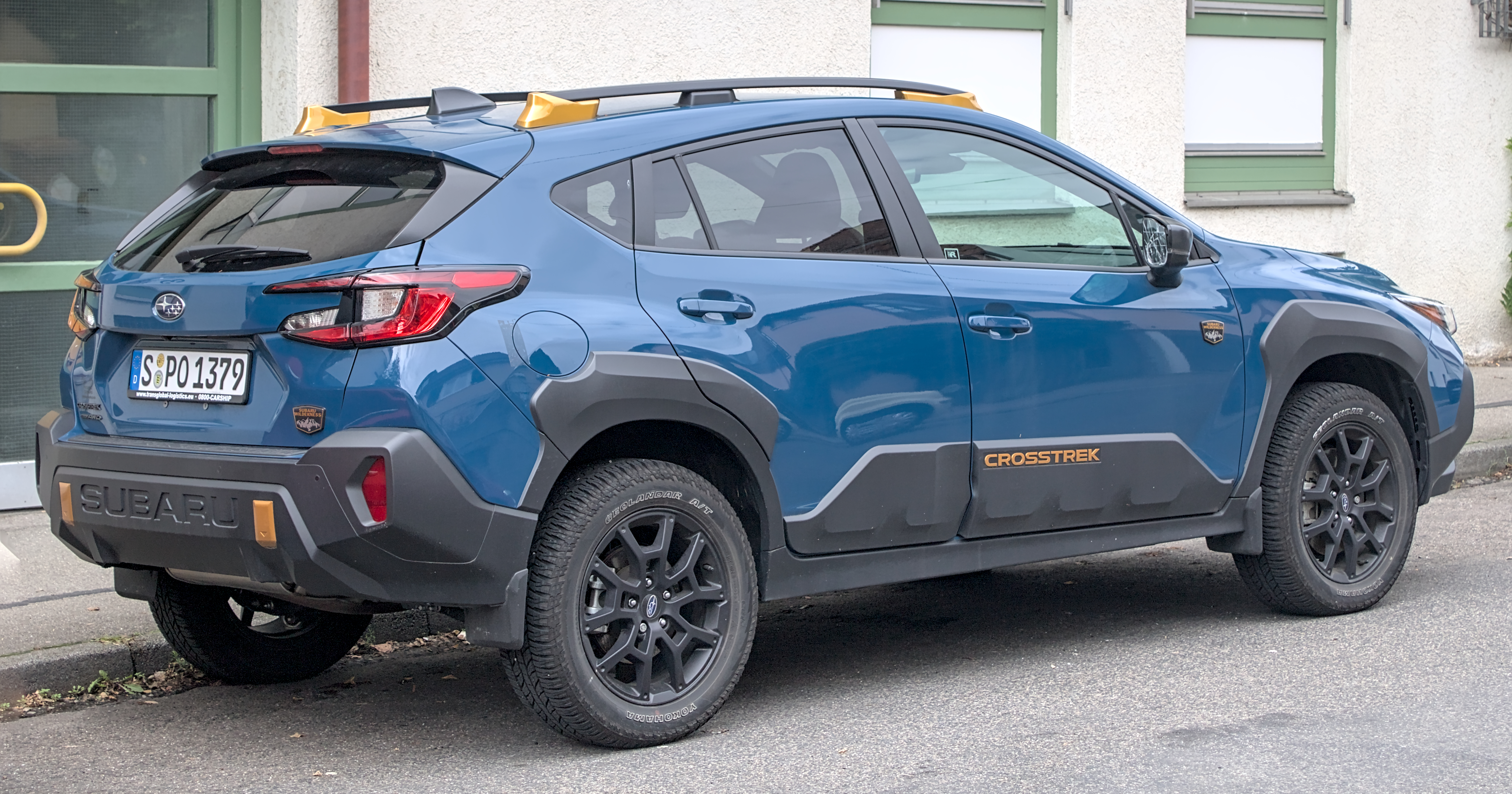
Crosstrek Wilderness

==== Crosstrek Hybrid ====
On January 17, 2025, Subaru of America revealed details of the third-generation Crosstrek Hybrid online. It debuted at the Chicago Auto Show on February 8, 2025, and began production in late 2025 for the 2026 model year. Unlike the prior Crosstrek Hybrid models, the third-generation Crosstrek Hybrid is a series-parallel hybrid using a 2.5-liter FB25 modified to run the Atkinson cycle. The engine alone produces 162 hp (164 PS; 121 kW), while the main traction motor produces 118 hp (120 PS; 88 kW) and 199 lb⋅ft (270 N⋅m; 28 kg⋅m) on its own, making the combined power output 194 hp (197 PS; 145 kW). The second motor is smaller and does not contribute to forward traction; instead, it operates the starter and works as a generator to recharge the hybrid batteries. Both electric motors and the engine are driven by an eCVT, which features X-MODE and a new EV driving mode. The Crosstrek Hybrid is offered in two trim levels, Sport Hybrid and Limited Hybrid. Two exclusive colors are offered on both trims, named Sand Dune Pearl and Citron Yellow Pearl.

=== Asia ===
The third-generation Crosstrek was launched in Indonesia at the Gaikindo Jakarta Auto Week on March 10, 2023, in the sole 2.0i-S EyeSight variant.

Pre-orders for the third-generation Crosstrek opened in Taiwan in March 2023, and officially went on sale in May 2023 in a sole variant, the 2.0i-S EyeSight. The Crosstrek GT Edition was introduced later in May 2024.

On July 12, 2023, Subaru's Philippine distributor Motor Image Pilipinas officially launched the third-generation Crosstrek with two trims: 2.0i-L and 2.0i-S, equipped with Subaru's EyeSight 4.0. The e-Boxer hybrid model was later introduced in June 2026.

The third-generation Crosstrek debuted in Vietnam at the Vietnam Motor Show on October 23, 2024, with two variants. It is powered by either a 2.0-liter gasoline or a 2.0-liter gasoline hybrid.

On December 5, 2024, Subaru revealed details of an enhanced Strong Hybrid version of the Crosstrek available for sale in the Japanese market.

The third-generation Crosstrek was launched in Thailand on March 23, 2026. Fully imported from Japan, it is available in the sole 2.0i-S EyeSight variant powered by the 2.0-liter FB20 gasoline.

The third-generation Crosstrek was launched in Malaysia on May 6, 2026. Fully imported from Japan, it is available in the sole 2.0i-S EyeSight variant powered by the 2.0-liter FB20 gasoline.

=== Safety ===
Euro NCAP test results Subaru Crosstrek 2.0 hybrid (LHD) (2024)
Test	Points	%
Overall:	5 /5 stars	
Adult occupant:	33.6	83%
Child occupant:	44.2	90%
Pedestrian:	54	85%
Safety assist:	13.1	72%

IIHS scores (2024)
Small overlap front	Good
Moderate overlap front (original test)	Good
Moderate overlap front (updated test)	Marginal
Side (updated test)	Acceptable
Headlights	Good
Front crash prevention: vehicle-to-vehicle	Good
Seatbelt reminders	Good
Child seat anchors (LATCH) ease of use	Good+

ANCAP test results Subaru Crosstrek (2024, aligned with Euro NCAP)
Test	Points	%
Overall:	5 /5 stars	
Adult occupant:	33.58	83%
Child occupant:	44.87	91%
Pedestrian:	53.99	85%
Safety assist:	13.29	73%

== Awards ==
Motor Trend ranked the 2023 Subaru Crosstrek #1 Subcompact SUV.

Consumer Reports ranked the 2022 Subaru Crosstrek #1 Subcompact SUV.

U.S. News & World Report ranked the Subaru Crosstrek at No. 6 on its list of Best Subcompact SUVs for 2022, giving it a score of 7.9 out of 10.

== Issues ==
=== North America ===
Many North American journalists and owners believe the Crosstrek is underpowered, like most cars in its class, and advocate for a turbocharged model, akin to the Subaru Impreza Gravel Express. This has partially been resolved with the MY2021 facelift since the Outdoor (Canada), Sport (US), and Limited trims now include a more powerful engine that brings its power closer to other compact crossover SUVs in the North American market and the competing Mazda CX-30 (non-turbocharged models).

MY2013–2018 Crosstreks with the CVT have had their transmission warranties extended to 10 years and 100,000 miles (and one year after their warranties were extended, that being 2018 for MY13-15 vehicles and 2019 for MY16-18 vehicles, regardless of age or mileage), with Subaru saying there were no complaints or conditions behind the extensions.

All MY2013 Crosstreks were given an extended engine warranty (8 years/100,000 miles, or one year from the warranty extension being published, regardless of age or mileage) due to excessive oil consumption after a class action lawsuit, with MY2014 and MY2015 models only being recalled with the manual transmission. All first generation Crosstreks were recalled for faulty brake light switches which Subaru stated was discovered themselves, with 33 reports on all affected models (including 2008–2016 Subaru Imprezas and 2014–2016 Subaru Foresters) in the US.

83,499 2018 Crosstreks and 37 2019 Crosstrek plug-In hybrids, along with 2017–2018 Subaru Imprezas and 2019 Subaru Forester and Ascent models were recalled for a faulty PCV valve that could break apart and cause oil consumption or possibly a stall.

In July 2021, a warranty extension for up to 10 years (and unlimited mileage) was applied to the electronic power steering rack of all 1st generation US Crosstreks (along with all 4th generation Foresters and Imprezas) due to the possibility of corrosion in areas with high amounts of road salt deployed in winter months (like the Salt Belt region of the United States) causing the rack to become prone to cracking after a significant impact. The issue doesn't cause complete failure of the rack, however it does cause issues with steering feel when turning. Owners who receive a repair will get an updated steering rack that is not prone to this issue.

In October 2021, a warranty extension for up to 8 years (and unlimited mileage) was applied to all first generation Crosstreks (along with most Subaru models of the time period) for the CVT parking brake switch, as when the contacts on the switch are contaminated, owners can't remove their key from their ignition switch. All affected vehicles, regardless or age or mileage, are covered by this extension until October 31, 2022.

== Sales ==
Sales in the United States have been much stronger than its predecessor, the Outback Sport, with 2020 being the first year with a sales drop, which could be attributed to a car sales slump in the US.

Calendar year	U.S.	Canada	Thailand	Australia
2012	7,396	2,008		9,908
2013	53,741	6,115		
2014	70,956	6,922	1,797	
2015	88,927	8,422	2,295	
2016	95,677	9,723	1,619	
2017	110,138	11,168	1,058	
2018	144,384	14,539	1,440	
2019	131,152	15,184		10,062
2020	119,716	15,392		7,947
2021	127,466	23,342		9,342
2022	155,142	7,523		9,090
2023	159,193			8,991
2024	181,811	28,303		11,545
2025	191,724			
