= Subaru Impreza XV =

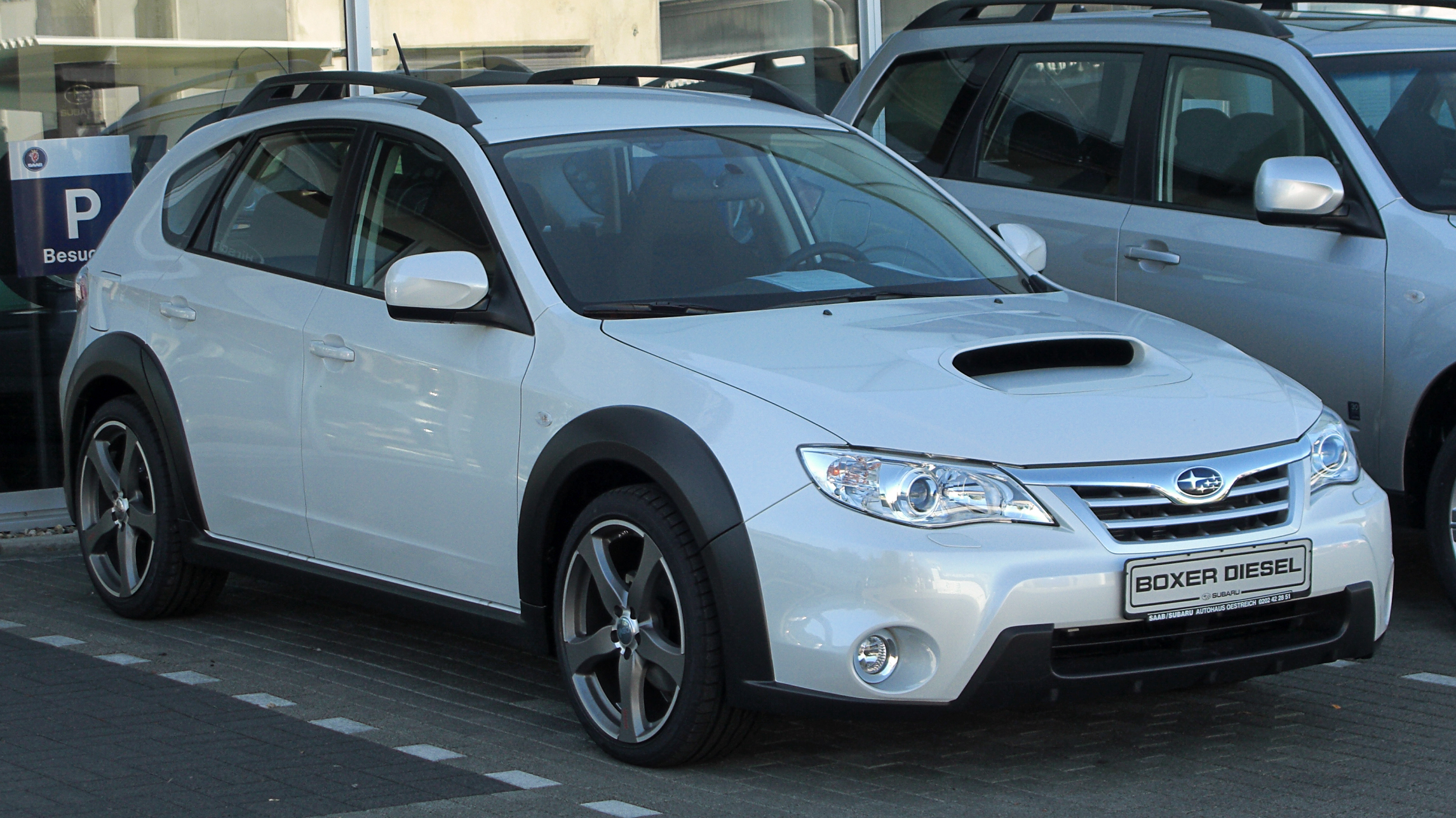
- Subaru Impreza XV 2.0D

Overview
- Manufacturer: Subaru
- Production: 2010–2012
- Model years: 2010–2011
- Assembly: Japan

Body and chassis
- Class: Compact car (C-segment)
- Body style: 5-door crossover
- Layout: Front-engine, AWD
- Platform: Subaru GH platform
- Related: Subaru Impreza (GH)

Powertrain
- Engine: Flat-four (Boxer); Gasoline: 2.0L EJ20 150 hp Diesel: 2.0L EE20 turbo 150 hp
- Transmission: 5-speed manual 6-speed manual 4-speed automatic

Dimensions
- Wheelbase: 2,620 mm (103.1 in)
- Length: 4,430 mm (174.4 in)
- Width: 1,770 mm (69.7 in)
- Height: 1,520 mm (59.8 in)
- Curb weight: 1,370–1,510 kg (3,020–3,330 lb)

Chronology
- Successor: Subaru XV

The Subaru Impreza XV is a compact car produced by the Japanese manufacturer Subaru. It is a crossover-styled version of the third-generation Subaru Impreza (GH), produced between 2010 and 2012. This model served as the direct predecessor to the standalone Subaru XV/Crosstrek line.

== History and description ==
The vehicle debuted in March 2010 at the Geneva Motor Show. Changes compared to the standard hatchback version included a new front grille, plastic wheel arch extensions, side skirts, and distinctive roof rails.

The interior featured bucket-style front seats with improved lateral support, designed for light off-road driving. These seats were finished with specific upholstery featuring brown contrast stitching, which was also applied to the armrest and steering wheel.

A distinctive visual feature of the 2.0-liter Diesel version was the functional hood scoop. This intake supplied cool air directly to the intercooler mounted on top of the Boxer engine. This solution, borrowed from performance models like the WRX and STi, became a hallmark of the diesel Impreza XV variants, distinguishing them from the gasoline versions which featured a smooth hood.

Thanks to its stiffened suspension and the low center of gravity provided by the Boxer engine, the model maintained car-like handling characteristics.

=== Equipment ===
The Subaru Impreza XV featured a high standard of factory equipment, including:

- Audio and multimedia: A premium audio system with a 6-disc CD changer supporting MP3 and WMA formats. It included a 10-speaker system with a central dashboard speaker and a USB port located in the center console.
- Climate control: Automatic climate control with a pollen filter was standard across all trim levels.
- Safety: Equipped with Vehicle Dynamics Control (VDC), six airbags (front, side, and curtain), and ISOFIX child seat anchors.
- Multi-function steering wheel: A three-spoke leather-wrapped steering wheel with brown stitching included integrated controls for the audio system, Bluetooth hands-free kit, and cruise control.
- Other features: Heated front seats, heated side mirrors, heated windshield wiper de-icer area, and power-adjustable mirrors were included as standard equipment.

== Suspension ==
Unlike its successor (the 2012 Subaru XV), the Impreza XV retained a suspension setup closer to the standard hatchback. However, it featured several modifications to handle light off-road duties:

- Stiffness: The suspension was tuned with stiffer springs and revised shock absorber damping rates to minimize body roll caused by the slightly elevated crossover profile.
- Ground clearance: In European markets, the ground clearance remained similar to the standard Impreza (approx. 150–155 mm), while in markets like Australia and New Zealand, a raised version with 185 mm (7.3 in) of clearance was offered.
- Architecture: It utilized MacPherson struts at the front and a double-wishbone multi-link setup at the rear, featuring reinforced bushings and specific stabilizer bars.

== See also ==
- Subaru Impreza
- Subaru XV
