= Subaru Ascent =

Mid-size crossover SUV

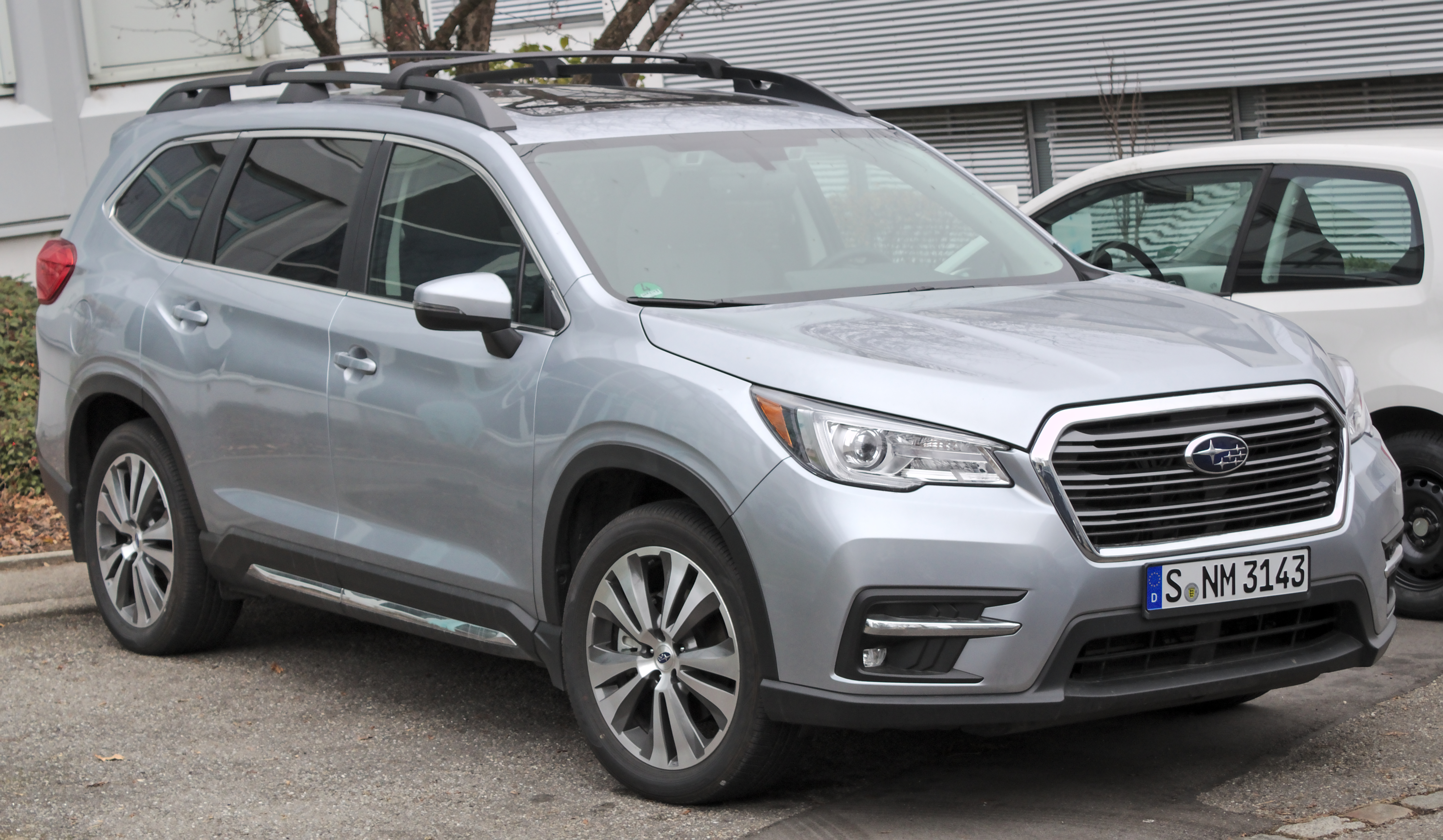

Overview
- Manufacturer: Subaru
- Model code: WM
- Also called: Subaru Evoltis (Philippines, South America, Israel)
- Production: 2018–present
- Model years: 2019–present (US); 2019–2025 (Canada)
- Assembly: United States: Lafayette, Indiana (SIA)

Body and chassis
- Class: Mid-size crossover SUV
- Body style: 5-door SUV
- Layout: Front-engine, all-wheel-drive
- Platform: Subaru Global Platform
- Related: Subaru Legacy (BW); Subaru Outback (BT)

Powertrain
- Engine: 2.4 L FA24F turbo H4 (gasoline)
- Power output: 260 hp (194 kW; 264 PS)
- Transmission: TR690 Lineartronic CVT

Dimensions
- Wheelbase: 113.8 in (2,891 mm)
- Length: 196.8 in (4,999 mm)
- Width: 76.0 in (1,930 mm)
- Height: 71.6 in (1,819 mm)
- Curb weight: 4,430–4,603 lb (2,009–2,088 kg)

Chronology
- Predecessor: Subaru Tribeca

The Subaru Ascent (Japanese: スバル・アセント, Hepburn: Subaru Asento) is a mid-size crossover SUV produced by Subaru. In some markets, it is sold as the Subaru Evoltis. It is the largest automobile Subaru manufactures. The seven or eight-seat passenger SUV, with the design based on the VIZIV-7 concept, made its debut at the LA Auto Show on November 28, 2017, and became available in the third quarter of 2018. It has an American-built predecessor, the Tribeca. The Ascent available in Japan, limited only 150 units.

== History ==
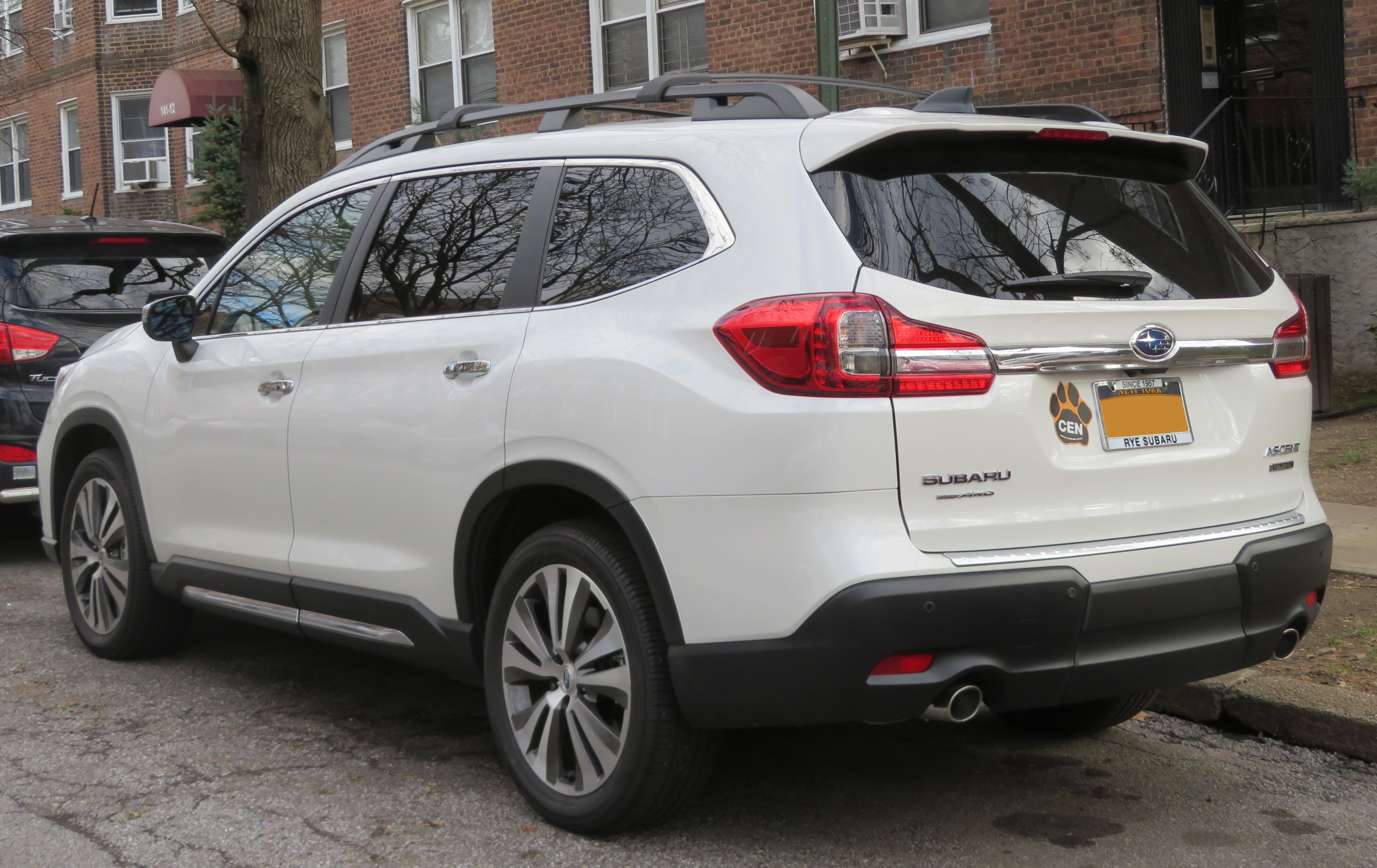
Rear view

The Ascent was originally introduced as a concept car at the 2017 New York International Auto Show in April, where it was also announced that Subaru would be producing the vehicle at its Lafayette, Indiana Subaru of Indiana Assembly Plant. Production began in late 2017 alongside the current Subaru Impreza. It was to be the flagship Subaru vehicle in North America, and replace the Subaru Tribeca (previously the B9 Tribeca), which was discontinued after the 2014 model year. Subaru Japan had their own three-row crossover called the Subaru Exiga that was available from 2008 until its discontinuation in 2018. In terms of exterior design, it was akin to a 3-row Outback as is the Ascent to the Forester.

The first spy photographs of Subaru Ascent development mules surfaced in late summer 2016. Although the Ascent was spotted testing in 2017 with an expected mid-2017 on-market date, the sale date was pushed back to early summer 2018.

Subaru initially announced the Ascent would be sold in the Philippines as the Evoltis starting from 2020. Its release was delayed numerous times owing to the COVID-19 pandemic, and eventually was introduced in the Philippines in May 2021. Only the Touring model is available. The Evoltis name is also used in several South American markets. Although some sources reported the Evoltis name would be used for the first battery electric vehicle sold by Subaru, that vehicle, which was co-developed with Toyota, was announced in September 2021 as the Subaru Solterra instead.

The Ascent was discontinued in Canada for the 2026 model year due to counter-tariffs being imposed on U.S.-made products.

=== Stop-sale recall ===
In August 2018, Subaru recalled (at least) 293 vehicles that were thought to have faulty spot welds. Due to the complexity of fixing such a problem, the company said it would instead provide owners with new vehicles. Most were still in dealer inventory; only nine had been sold. However, after physical inspection all 293 vehicles were correctly welded and cleared for service.

== Design ==
The Ascent is built on the Subaru Global Architecture (SGA) platform. The Ascent is powered by a 2.4-liter turbocharged boxer four-cylinder (H4) gasoline engine, which produces 260 horsepower (194 kW; 264 PS) and 277 pound-feet (376 N⋅m; 38 kg⋅m) of torque. All Ascent models feature all-wheel-drive as standard equipment.

With both rows of rear seats folded down, the Ascent has a total cargo capacity of 86.5 cubic feet (2,450 L) and 153.5 cubic feet (4.35 m^{3}) of total passenger volume. Ground clearance is 8.7 inches (220 mm).

=== Features ===
The Ascent introduced new technologies that were not available in other Subaru models at its launch, such as optional mobile Wi-Fi capabilities and standard EyeSight driver assistance technologies (the system was available as an option on other Subaru models).

A suite of new Starlink infotainment systems, first introduced on the 2017 Subaru Impreza, is available on the Ascent. The base system features a seven-inch color touch screen display, standard Apple CarPlay and Android Auto connectivity, and SiriusXM Satellite Radio. Available features include integrated GPS navigation provided by TomTom, and an eight-inch color touch screen display.

== Models (United States) ==
=== Base (2019–2024) ===
The Base was the original base trim level. Standard features included all-wheel drive, driver assistance technologies, eight-passenger seating, raised roof rails, cloth seats, and a three-zone climate control system. The Base trim level was dropped for the 2025 model year.

=== Premium (2019–present) ===
The Premium was the mid-level trim of the Ascent until the 2025 model year, when it became the base trim. It adds a choice of either seven or eight-passenger seating by deleting the second-row bench seat in favor of individual captain's chairs, a 5,000-pound (2,300 kg) maximum towing capacity, blind spot detection (BLIS) with rear cross-path detection, and the All-Weather Package with heated front seats. Optional on the Premium is the Convenience Package. This package includes a power rear lift gate, keyless access with push button start, an auto-dimming rearview mirror, as well as reverse emergency braking.

=== Onyx Edition (2022–2025) ===
The Onyx Edition trim level features unique black wheels, badging, and exterior trim. The Onyx edition also receives Subaru's StarTex water-repellent upholstery. The Onyx Edition slots between the Premium and Limited trim levels and receives more standard features over the Premium, such as reverse automatic braking, a power rear tailgate, a heated steering wheel, and push button start. A single option package is available for the Onyx edition, which includes a panoramic moon roof, navigation, and a cargo cover.

=== Limited (2019–present) ===
The Limited is the "luxury" trim level of the Ascent. It adds leather-trimmed upholstery, 20-inch (51 cm) aluminum-alloy wheels, keyless access with push-button start, adaptive front headlamps, reverse automatic braking, and a power rear tailgate. Optional on the Limited is a “Technology Package” which adds a Harman Kardon premium audio system, panoramic moon roof, navigation, and a cargo area cover. Second row captain's chairs are optional.

==== Limited Bronze Edition (2025–present) ====
The Bronze edition adds a bronze finish to the side-cladding, intake-cover, and the alloy wheels. In the interior, the leather-trimmed upholstery found on the Limited is replaced with Subaru's StarTex water-repellent upholstery. In addition, bronze-colored stitching is added along with a bronze finish to the steering wheel insert.

=== Touring (2019–present) ===
The Touring is the top-of-the-line Ascent trim level. It adds Java Brown leather-trimmed seating surfaces, second-row captain's chairs with seven-passenger seating, heated and ventilated front seats, rear sunshades, a panoramic power moon roof, and a Harman Kardon premium audio system with 14 speakers and 792 watts of total power. Inside, the Touring has wood door trim and interior ambient lighting.

==== Onyx Edition Touring (2025–present) ====
The Onyx Edition Touring adds the styling elements found on the standard Onyx Edition to the Touring trim. However, it does not receive the StarTex upholstery found in the standard Onyx Edition, instead it features exclusive leather-trimmed black heated and ventilated seats with silver stitching.

=== Model year changes ===
- 2020: A new rear seat reminder is made standard across the Ascent lineup, the Premium trim and above gets a one-touch lighting system to turn all the interior lights on or off, the optional rear power lift gate gets a "vehicle lo button", and new power folding exterior side mirrors are made standard on the top Touring trim. The Warm Ivory interior color is no longer available with the Crimson Red Pearl exterior, while the Abyss Blue Pearl exterior gains an optional Slate Black interior color.
- 2021: Steering-responsive LED headlights with automatic high beams are made standard on all trim levels. They were previously only standard on the Limited and Touring and were not offered on the lower trim levels. In exterior colors, Tungsten Metallic is replaced by Brilliant Bronze Metallic, the Touring model is now available the Ice Silver Metallic exterior. The adaptive cruise control system was also updated, with lane centering assist instead of the previous lane keep assist. Touring models also received an optional Slate Black interior color, which gave a second interior color choice on the Touring trim, which was previously only offered in Java Brown. New self-registering TPMS sensors were made standard as well as the second and third row seats receiving seat-belt reminders.
- 2022: Introduction of a new Onyx Edition trim level. The Autumn Green Metallic exterior color is introduced, while the Cinnamon Brown Pearl exterior is discontinued. The base "Ascent" trim level receives slightly updated wheels.
- 2023: The Ascent received a facelift with a new front fascia, new LED headlights with high-beam assist, new C-shaped taillights, the 6.5-inch and optional 8.0-inch infotainment displays both have been replaced by a vertical 11.6-inch touchscreen display, improvements to standard features across the range, and the inclusion of new features such as Cabin Connect interior microphone feature.
- 2024: Updated Eyesight Technology as well as new mirror design for all trims. Each trim gets integrated turn signals standard.
- 2025: The introduction of the Bronze Edition and Onyx Edition Touring trim levels, the Base trim was discontinued, and improved standard equipment across the range.
- 2026: The Onyx Edition trim level is discontinued. A new exterior color, Sapphire Blue Pearl, replaces Cosmic Blue Pearl.
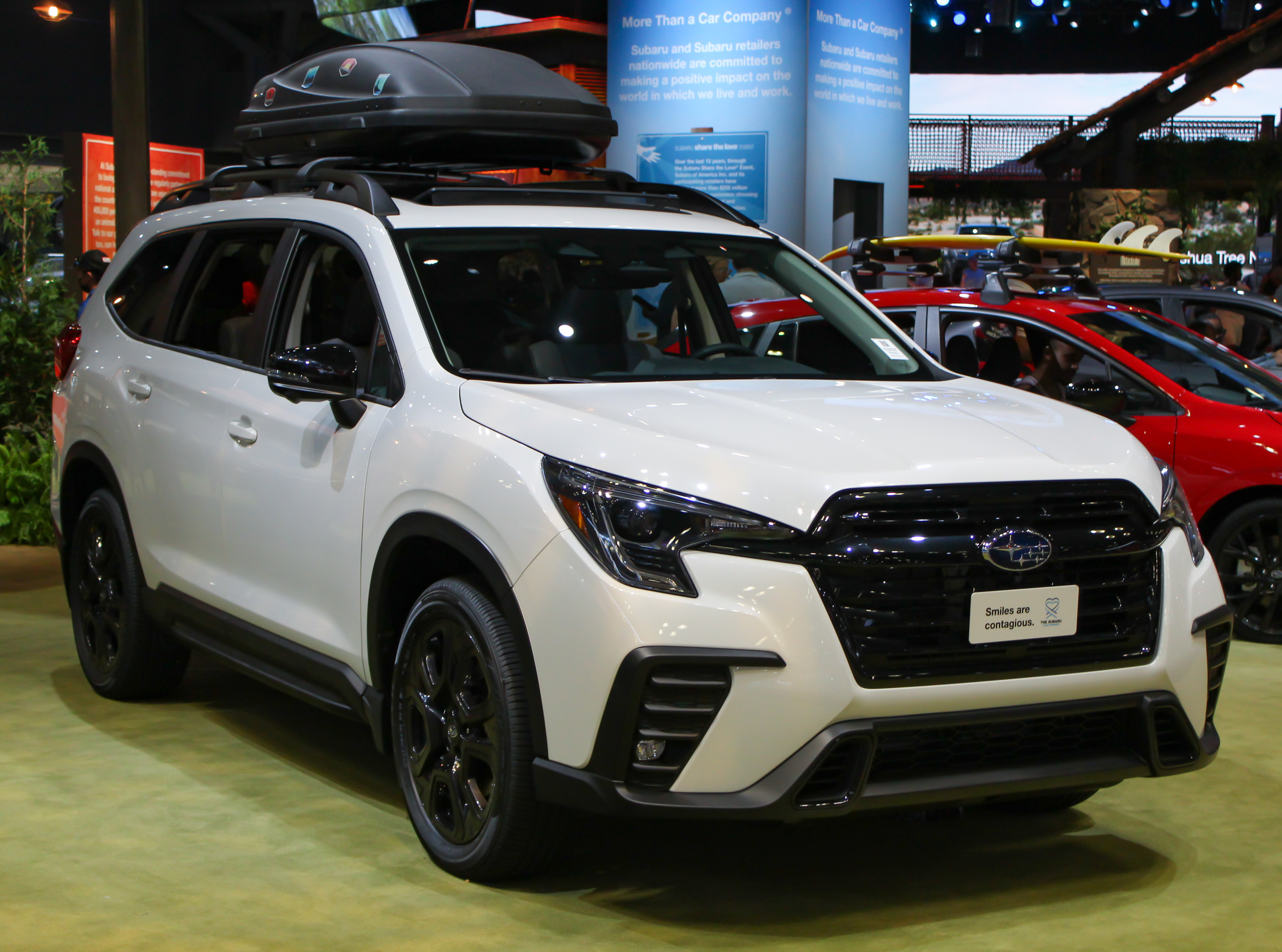
  Facelift

== Engine and Powertrain ==
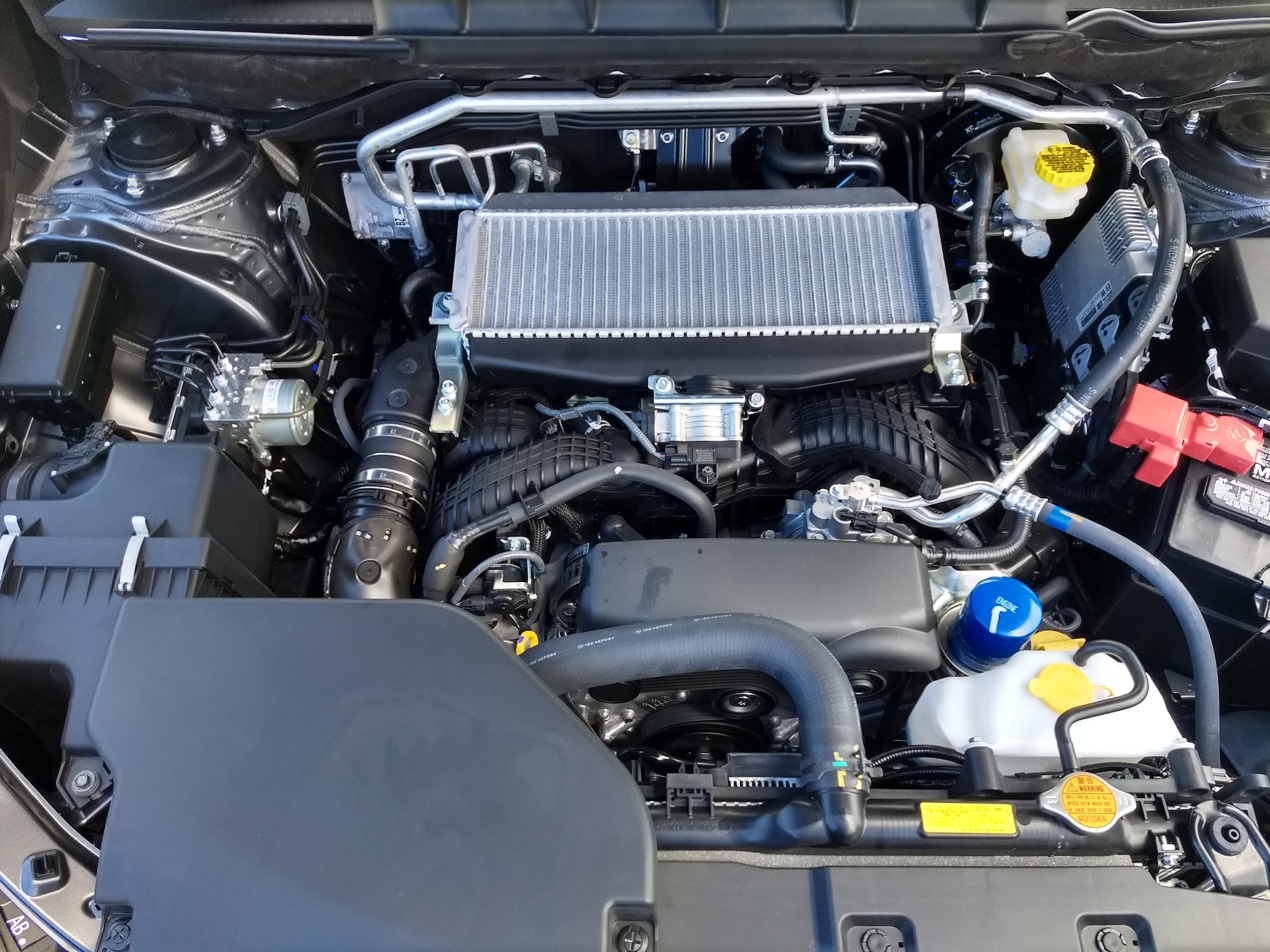
Engine

The Ascent features a newly developed FA24 engine. The turbocharged direct injection flat-four engine has a 94 mm × 86 mm (3.7 in × 3.4 in) bore × stroke for a total displacement of 2,387 cc (145.7 cu in) with a 10.6:1 compression ratio. The cylinder block and heads are made of aluminum alloy, and the heads each have twin overhead camshafts driven by a timing chain. Peak power is 260 hp (194 kW; 264 PS) at 5,600 rpm, and peak torque of 277 lb⋅ft (376 N⋅m; 38 kg⋅m) is achieved between 2,000 and 4,800 rpm. Regular unleaded (87 octane) gasoline is recommended.

Power is sent from the engine to a CVT with eight simulated gears. Then engine torque is sent directly to front wheels and variably to the rear wheels by a center multi-plate transfer clutch. The clutch is usually operated with minimal slip so that a torque distribution of 60% on the front axle and 40% on the rear axle is available. The transfer clutch control module can vary the power distribution based on driving conditions, up to a maximum rearward distribution of 50/50 front-to-rear.

== Reception ==
After performing preliminary testing on a development prototype, Motor Trend wrote that mid-range power seemed a bit limited when passing at cruising speed, likely because Subaru aimed for best-in-class fuel economy for the upcoming Ascent. They also observed the ride was well-damped and the interior was quiet.

The follow-up Motor Trend article stated that the "2.4-liter turbocharged boxer-four proves surprisingly satisfying” and that “the Ascent provides enough motivation for merging onto the highway or passing other vehicles.”

Consumer Reports deemed it "the right vehicle for many suburban families”.

== Safety ==
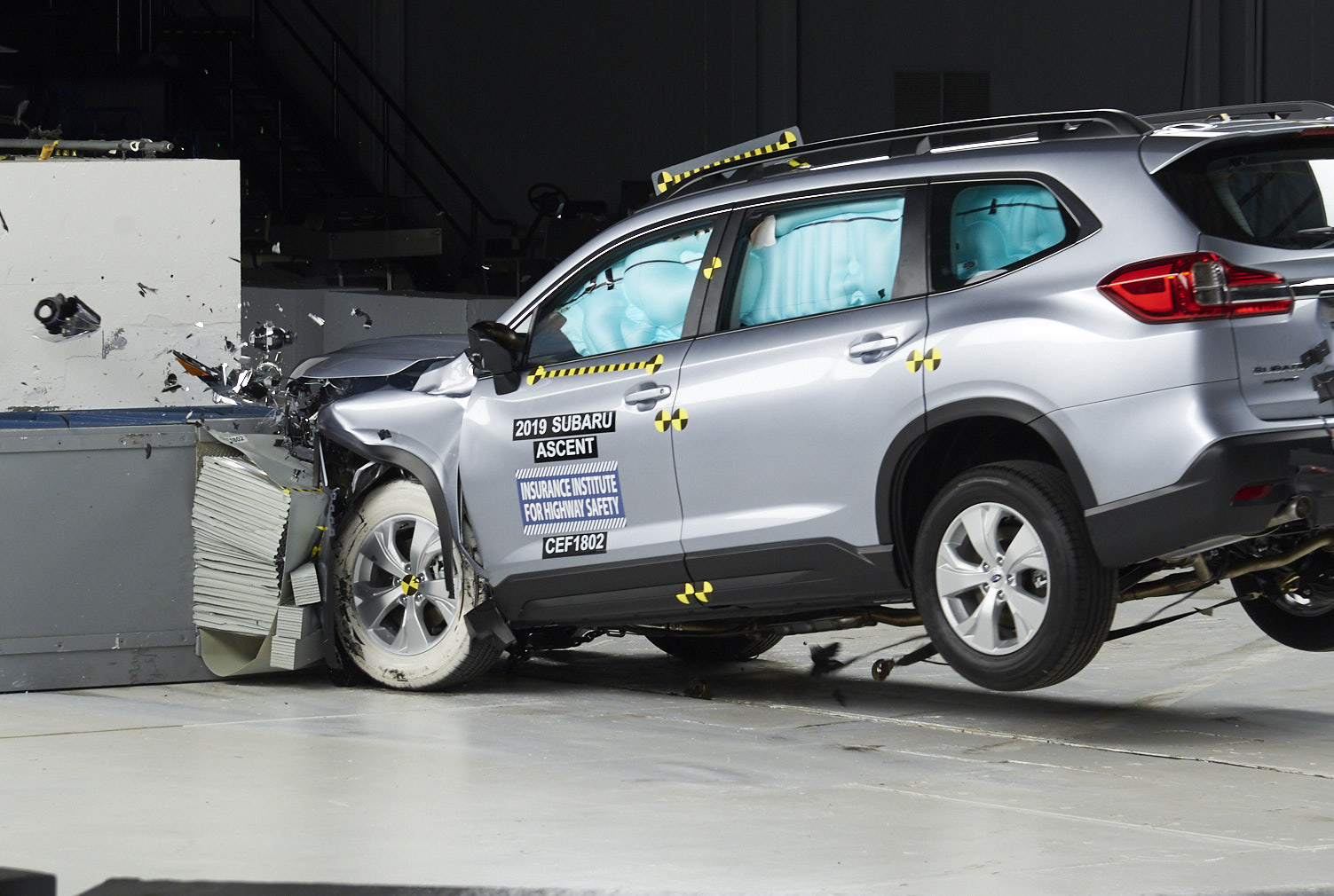
Moderate-overlap crash test of a 2019 Subaru Ascent performed by the Insurance Institute for Highway Safety

The 2021 Ascent is currently holding the 2020 IIHS Top Safety Pick+.

IIHS scores: 2021 Subaru Ascent
Small overlap front (driver)	Good
Small overlap front (passenger)	Good
Moderate overlap front	Good
Side impact	Good
Roof strength	Good
Head restraints & seats	Good
Front crash prevention: vehicle-to-vehicle	Superior
Front crash prevention: vehicle-to-pedestrian	Superior
Headlights	Good (all trims)
Child seat anchors (latch) ease of use	Good+ (extra LATCH positions)

== Awards and recognition ==
- 2019 Autotrader Best New Cars for 2019 list
- Parents 10 Best Family Cars of 2019
- 2021 Kelley Blue Book Lowest 5-Year Cost to Own: Mid-Size – 3-row

== Sales ==
Calendar year	U.S.	Canada
2018	36,211	2,093
2019	81,958	4,139
2020	67,623	3,028
2021	59,980	3,359
2022	63,704	
2023	60,543	
2024	56,286	
2025	44,400	
