= Subaru Legacy (sixth generation) =

Sixth generation of Subaru Legacy

Subaru Legacy BN series
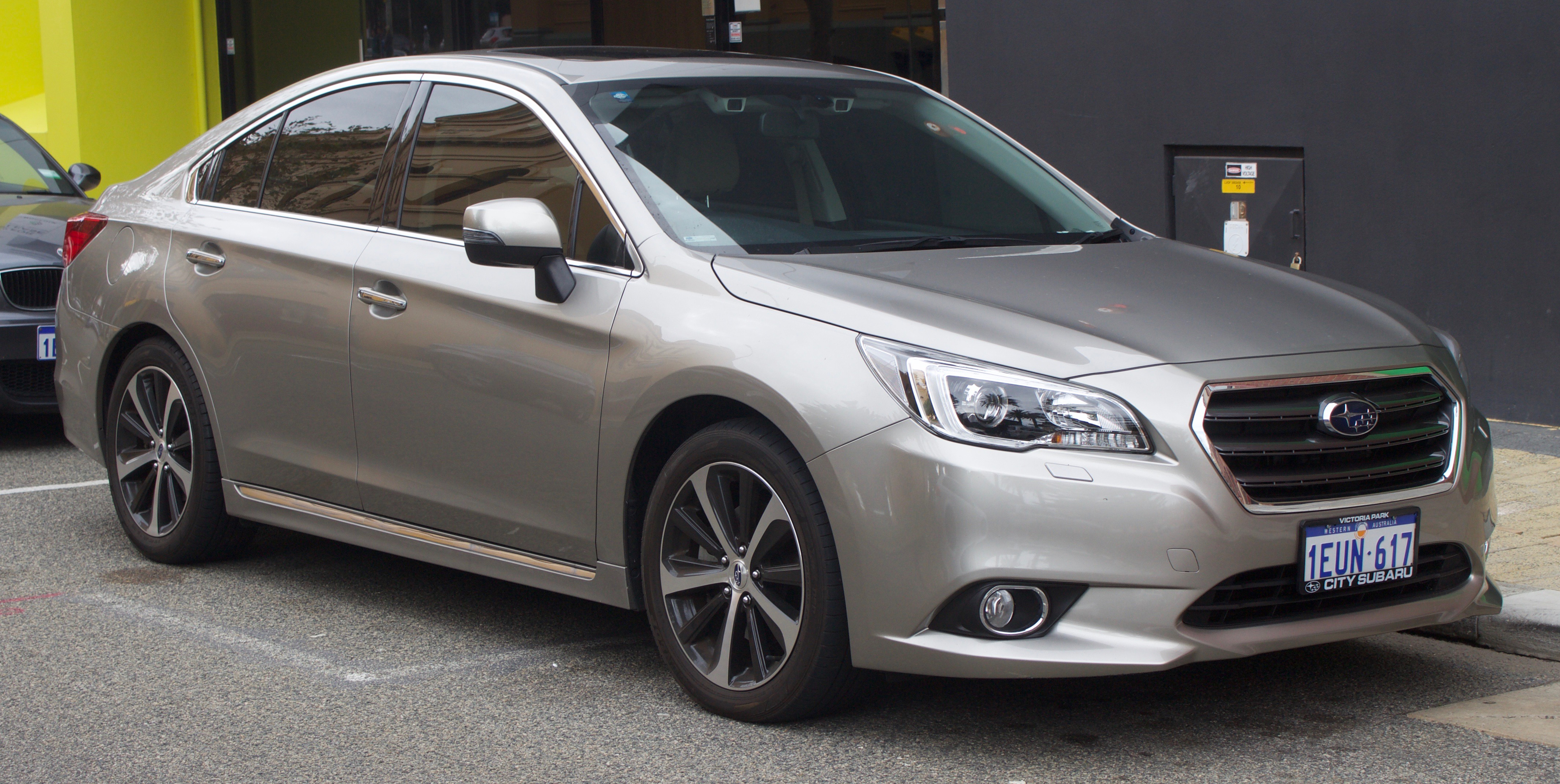
- 2015 Subaru Liberty 3.6R sedan (Australia)

Overview
- Manufacturer: Subaru (Subaru Corporation)
- Model code: BN
- Also called: Legacy B4; Subaru Liberty (Australia)
- Production: 2014–2019 (Sedan)
- Model years: 2015–2019 (North America)
- Assembly: Ōta, Gunma, Japan; Lafayette, Indiana, United States (SIA)

Body and chassis
- Body style: 4-door sedan
- Layout: Front-engine, all-wheel-drive
- Related: Subaru Outback (5th generation); Subaru Tribeca; Subaru Exiga; Subaru Levorg

Powertrain
- Engine: 2.5 L SOHC i-AVLS 170 hp (130 kW) H4 EJ25 (South Africa, Outback); 2.5 L DOHC DAVCS 170 hp (130 kW) H4 FB25; 3.6 L DOHC DAVCS 256 hp (191 kW) H6 EZ36; 2.0 L DOHC turbodiesel 148 hp (110 kW) H4 EE20
- Transmission: 7-speed or 8-speed Lineartronic CVT; 6-speed manual

Dimensions
- Wheelbase: 2,751 mm (108.3 in)
- Length: Sedan: 4,796 mm (188.8 in); Outback: 4,816 mm (189.6 in)
- Width: Sedan: 1,839 mm (72.4 in); Outback: 1,838 mm (72.4 in)
- Height: Sedan: 1,499 mm (59 in); Outback: 1,679 mm (66.1 in)
- Curb weight: Sedan: 1,661 kg (3,662 lb) (3.6R Limited); Outback: 1,730 kg (3,810 lb) (3.6R Limited)

Chronology
- Predecessor: Subaru Legacy (fifth generation)
- Successor: Subaru Legacy (seventh generation)

The Subaru Legacy (BN) is the sixth generation of the Legacy range of mid-size cars.

== Overview ==
The sixth generation of the Subaru Legacy made its debut at the 2014 Chicago Auto Show, and went into production for the 2015 model year. The Legacy Touring wagon was dropped from the lineup worldwide, leaving only the Outback as its Crossover/MPV counterpart, especially in its home market of Japan.

=== Engines and drivetrain ===
A 2.5-liter flat-four FB25 and a 3.6-liter flat-six EZ36D are carried over from the fifth-generation model. Output is slightly increased on the four-cylinder model to 175 PS (129 kW; 173 bhp). The six-cylinder model remains unchanged from the 256 PS (188 kW; 252 bhp) 3.6-liter engine.

The Legacy still offers standard all-wheel drive and horizontally opposed engine layouts, but discontinues the manual transmission for the US market in favor of the Lineartronic CVT on both engine configurations. The Canadian market offered the manual transmission for the 2.5i and 2.5i Touring trim levels until 2017.

=== EyeSight ===
EyeSight is Subaru's active safety system. When turned on, it monitors the road through windshield-mounted cameras and can react to driving conditions and possible collisions, even before the driver can. Models equipped with EyeSight earned the highest possible rating in the IIHS front crash safety test.

The Adaptive Cruise Control function senses the speed and pace of vehicles ahead of the vehicle, and can automatically adjust the cruise control accordingly. Pre-Collision Braking uses the cameras to monitor the activity of the vehicles in front of the vehicle, and alerts the driver visually and audibly. It can also apply the brakes, if the driver hasn't already done so. According to Subaru, EyeSight also monitors the vehicle's space in its lane. It will alert the driver if the vehicle has accidentally swayed too far to either side of the lane.

All of these features are available on the 2.5i Premium, 2.5i Limited, and 3.6R Limited models.

=== Features and amenities ===
The Subaru Legacy comes in five trim levels: the base 2.5i, 2.5i Premium, 2.5i Sport, 2.5i Limited, and 3.6R Limited. Below is the detail of the US model.

- Base 2.5i
  - Comes with Halogen projector low-beam headlamps with Halogen multireflector high-beams, fog lights, Subaru's PIN Code Access system, a manual climate-control system (with air conditioning), Subaru STARLINK infotainment, a 6.2 inch high-resolution touchscreen, a 4-speaker sound system, HD Radio AM/FM radio, a rear-view camera, Symmetrical AWD, a 6-way manually adjustable driver's seat, and a 4-way manually adjustable passenger seat.
  - The only option for this trim is the Partial Zero Emissions Certification package.
- 2.5i Premium
  - Comes with all the aforementioned equipment of the base 2.5i, plus a dual-zone climate-control system, a larger 7 inch high-resolution touchscreen, voice commands for most functions (including for the climate-control, phone, and audio functions), Satellite Radio, an upgraded 6-speaker sound system, tri-level heated front seats, a leather wrapped steering wheel & shift lever, and an 8-way power adjustable driver's seat.

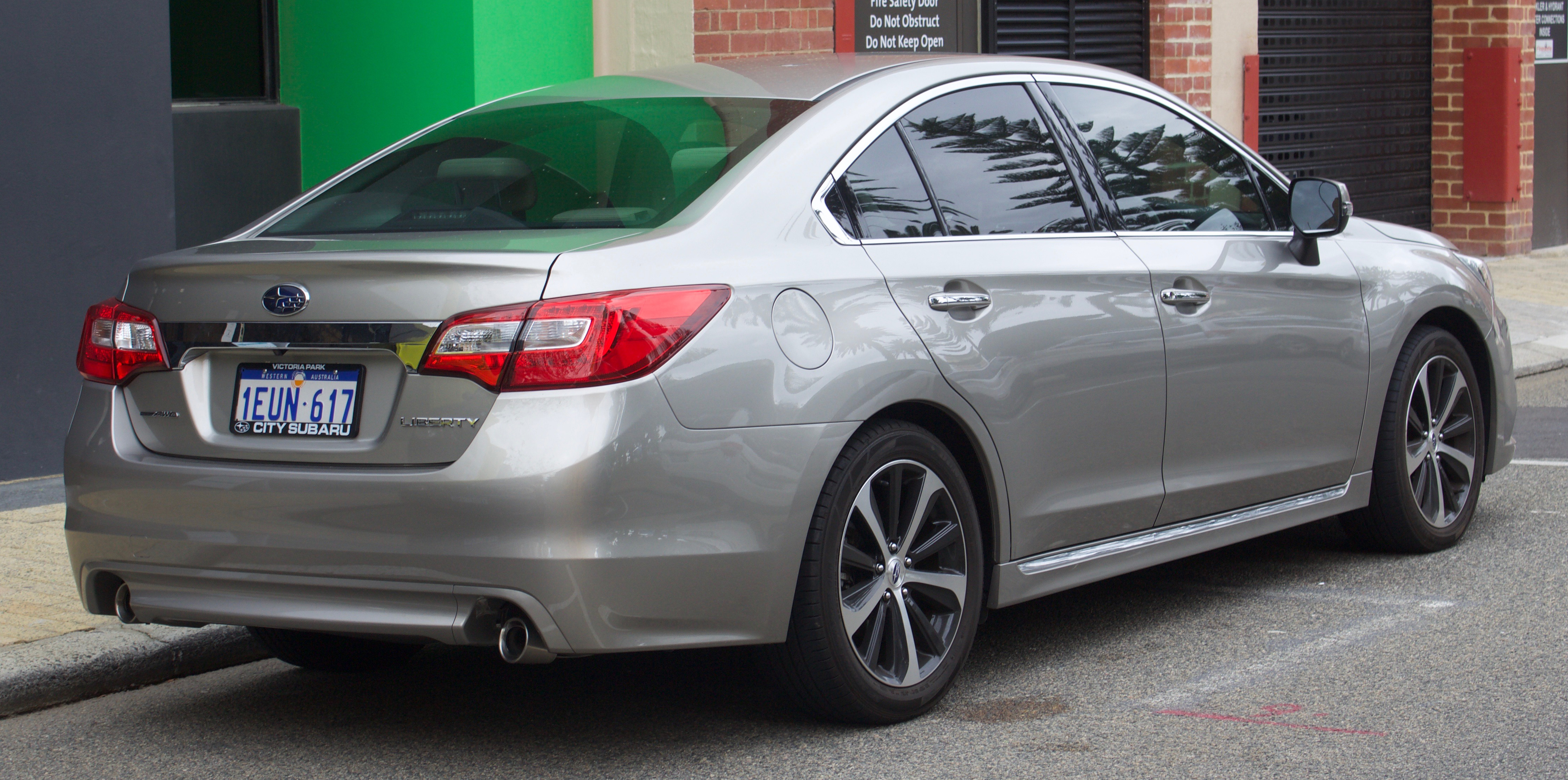
Subaru Liberty 3.6R (Pre-facelift)

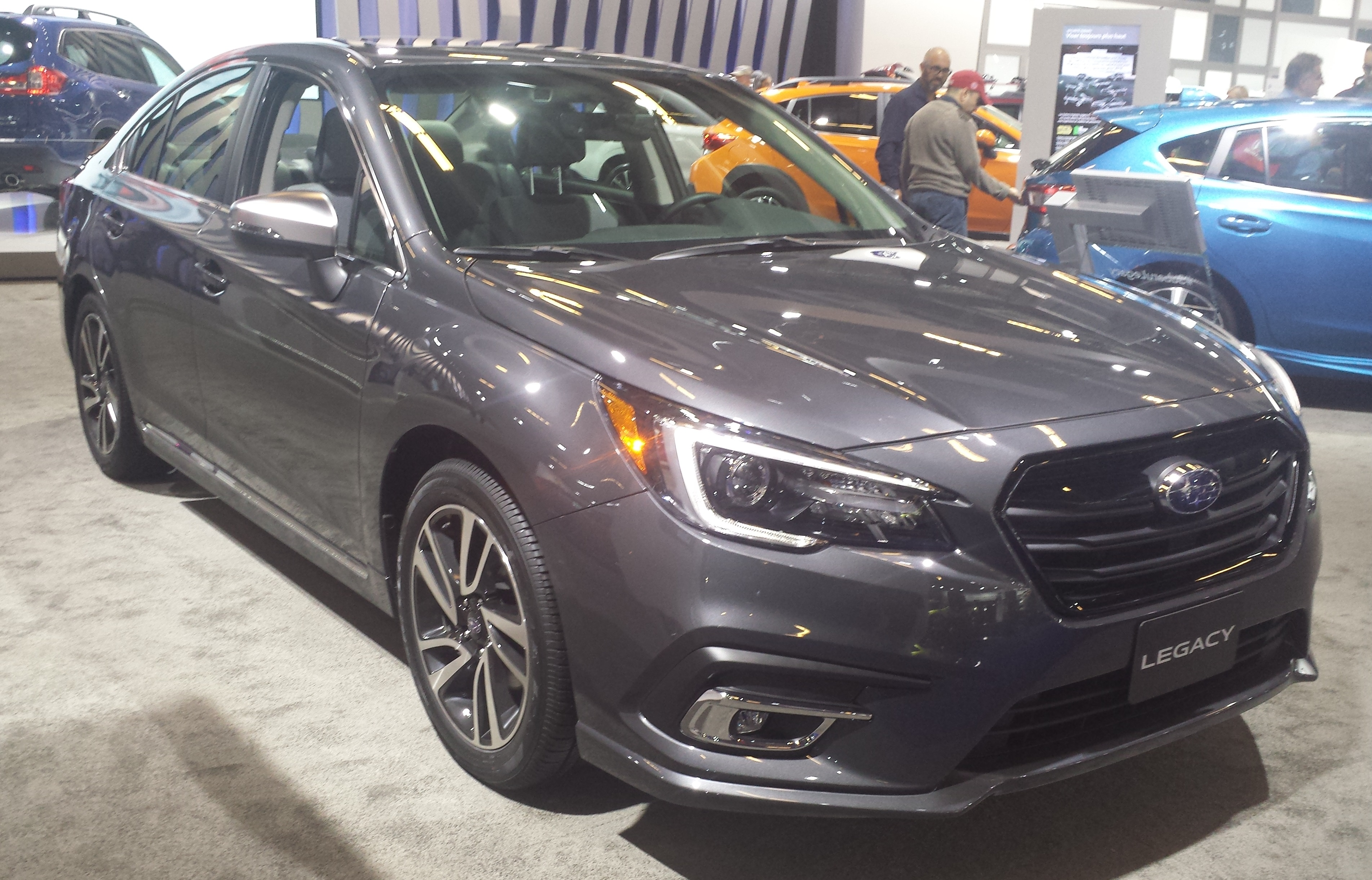
Facelift Subaru Legacy

  - Options for the 2.5i Premium are a moonroof, a Blind Spot Detection system with Lane Change Assist & Cross Traffic Alert, a Voice-Activated GPS navigation system, and the EyeSight camera-based safety system. The EyeSight camera-based safety system option also includes Steering Responsive Fog Lights, which is a more affordable alternative to having adaptive headlights.
- 2.5i Sport
  - A new trim available with the 2017 model year, this trim comes with almost all the standard features of the 2.5i Premium; it also includes 18-inch aluminum alloy wheels, push-button start with keyless entry, a power moonroof, and a rear spoiler.
- 2.5i Limited
  - Additional features include leather upholstery, dual-level heated rear seats, a 12-speaker Harman Kardon sound system, matte faux-wood trim, dual USB ports in the center storage area, a Blind Spot Detection system with Lane Change Assist & Cross Traffic Alert, and two-position memory for the driver's seat. The option for push-button start with passive-keyless entry becomes available at this trim level. (HID low-beam in 2017 models)
- The 3.6R Limited trim is comparably equipped to the 2.5i Limited trim.
  - With the addition of the 3.6-liter H-6, it has a high-torque CVT, and HID (Xenon) low-beam headlamps with Halogen multireflector high-beams.
  - Options for the 3.6R Limited trim are the same as the 2.5i Limited trim.

=== Markets ===
==== North American models ====
Model	Transmission
2.5i, 2.5i Premium, 2.5i Sport	Lineartronic CVT: Note: Canada only: also 6-speed MT – Touring in place of Premium with added features
2.5i Limited, PZEV (all trim levels)	Lineartronic CVT
3.6R Limited	Lineartronic HCVT

==== Japanese models ====
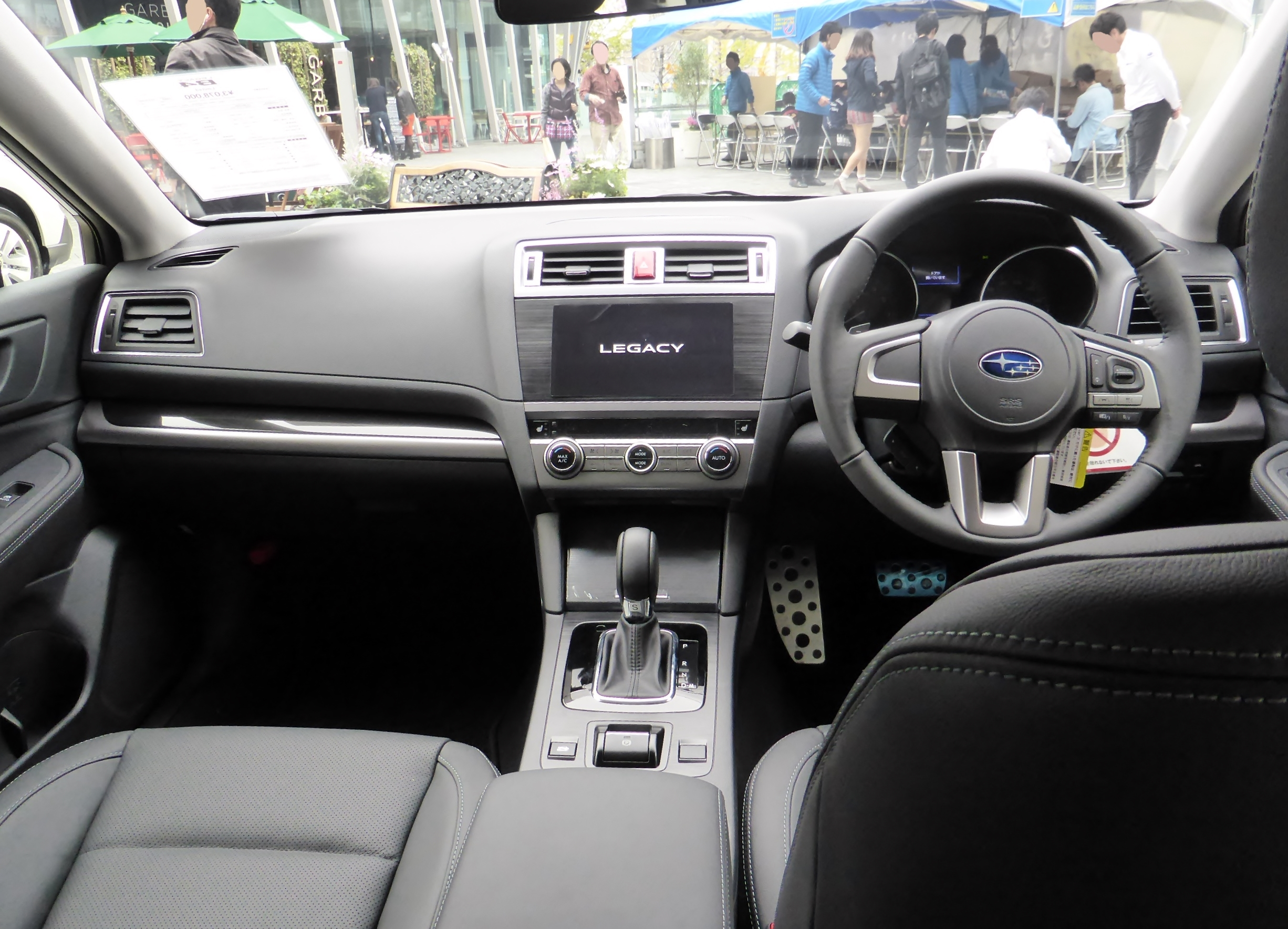
Interior

This is the last Legacy model sold in this location. The exterior body panels are now shared internationally, as opposed to the North American version having a slightly different grille and hood for the previous generation.

Model	Transmission
2.5	Lineartronic CVT
2.5 Limited	Lineartronic CVT

==== Southeast Asian models ====
Model available as of December 2, 2014, the sixth generation Subaru Legacy was officially launched in Southeast Asian region. The sixth-generation Legacy debuted in the 2015 Manila International Auto Show in the Philippines.

Model	Transmission
2.5i-S	Lineartronic CVT
3.6R-S	Lineartronic CVT

==== European models ====
There is one engine, a 2.5-liter, and trim levels include SE and SE Premium.

==== South African models ====
The Subaru Legacy is available in South Africa with the 3.6L engine only. There is only one derivative, the 3.6R-S ES Premium.

==== Middle East model ====
Model	Transmission
2.5i	Lineartronic CVT
2.5i-S	Lineartronic CVT
3.6R	Lineartronic CVT

==== Australian model ====
Model	Transmission
2.5	Lineartronic CVT
2.5 Premium	Lineartronic CVT
3.6R	Lineartronic CVT

Due to the lack of right-hand-drive 7th-generation Legacy production in Japan, the sixth generation was the final generation sold in Australia, with 31 sixth-generation Libertys offered as the "Subaru Liberty Final Edition". These featured various upgrades, including STi wheel and body components, unique numbering, upgraded infotainment system, black exterior highlights instead of chrome, and blue and black stitching instead of the usual colors. It was offered in only three colors: Magnetite Grey (15 units), Crystal Black (10 units), and Crystal White (6 units).

== Specifications ==
=== Chassis types ===
code	BN
body styles	sedan

=== Engines ===
Model	Years	Type (code)	Power, torque@rpm
North American engines
2.5i, PZEV (USA)	2012–	2,498 cc (2.5 L; 152.4 cu in) H4 (FB25)	173 bhp (129 kW) @5600, 174 lb⋅ft (236 N⋅m) @4100
3.6R (USA)	2009–	3,630 cc (3.6 L; 221.5 cu in) H6 (EZ36)	256 bhp (191 kW) @6000, 247 lb⋅ft (335 N⋅m) @4400
Japanese engines
2.5i (Japan)	2014–	2,498 cc (2.5 L; 152.4 cu in) H4 (FB25)	175 PS (129 kW; 173 hp) @5800, 235 N⋅m (173 lb⋅ft) @4000

=== Transmissions ===
Model	Years	Type
Global engines
2.5i	2009–	Lineartronic CVT
2.5GT	2009–	6-speed manual
2.0D	2009–	6-speed manual, Lineartronic CVT
North American, Japan engines
2.5i	2009–	6-speed manual, Lineartronic CVT
2.5GT	2009–	6-speed manual
3.6R	2015–2019	Lineartronic CVT

Models with Lineartronic Continuously variable transmission include steering column-mounted paddle shifters that allow the driver to select 8 "virtual gears" in manual mode.

=== Safety ===
ANCAP test results Subaru Liberty / Legacy (2015)
Test	Score
Overall	5 /5 stars
Frontal offset	14.99/16
Side impact	16/16
Pole	2/2
Seat belt reminders	3/3
Whiplash protection	Good
Pedestrian protection	Adequate
Electronic stability control	Standard
