= Subaru Global Platform =

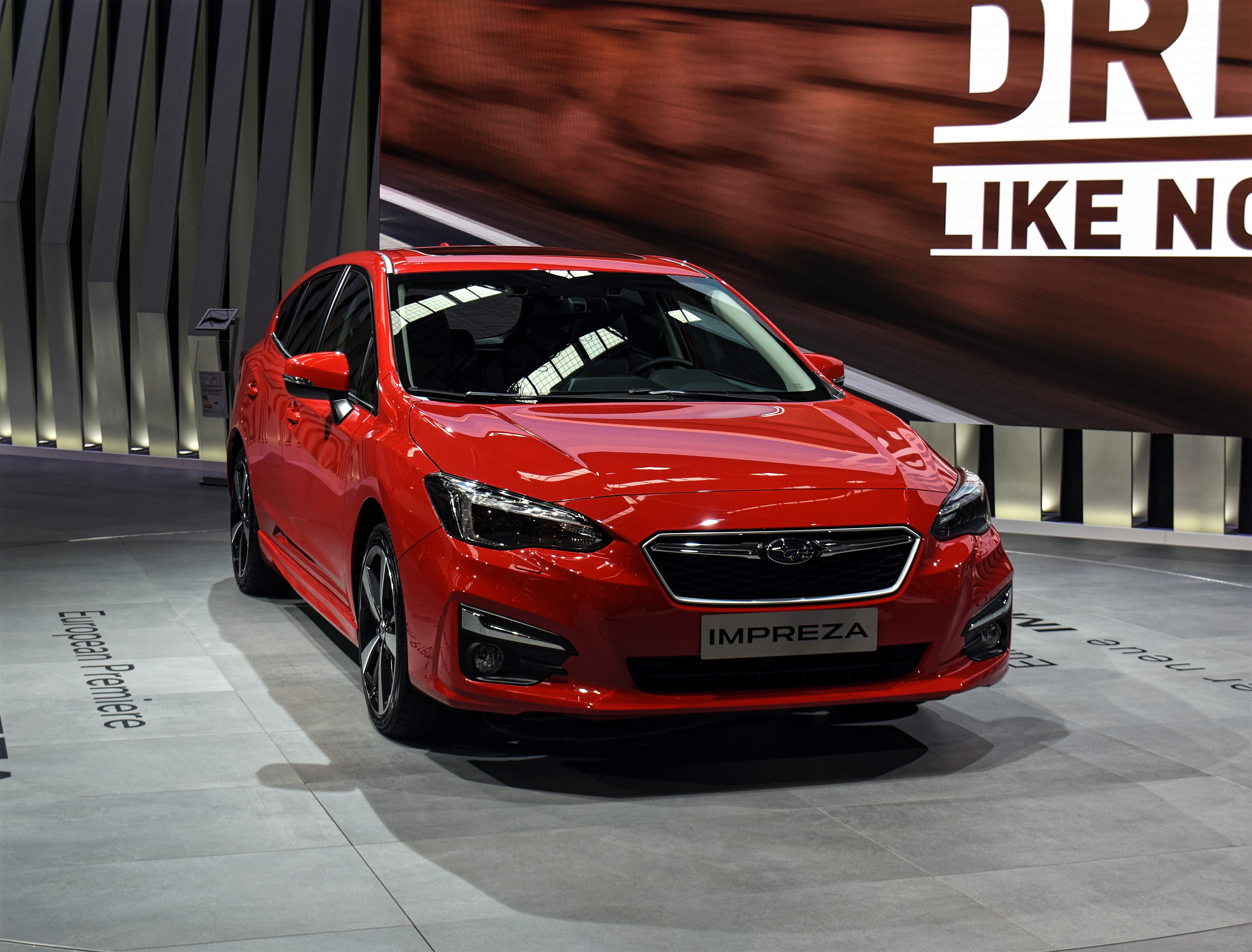
- Fifth-generation Subaru Impreza hatchback, the first vehicle to use the Subaru Global Platform

Overview
- Manufacturer: Subaru
- Production: 2016–present

Chronology
- Predecessor: SI chassis (SIシャシー)

The Subaru Global Platform (スバルグローバルプラットフォーム), abbreviated as SGP, is the modular unibody automobile platform for nearly all models manufactured by Subaru, starting with the fifth-generation Subaru Impreza in 2016. The primary dynamic benefits of SGP compared to prior Subaru platforms were improved strength, increased rigidity, and a lowered center of gravity. In addition, moving to a common platform made production more flexible and efficient; existing production lines could shift to meet demand by producing different models without significant reconfiguration, and common parts could be reused between models.

As of 2021, SGP underpins all of the vehicles built and sold by Subaru. The WRX, debuting its second generation on September 10, 2021 for model year 2022, was the last model to move to the SGP. Models built by other manufacturers and rebadged by Subaru (such as the Justy and kei car models), and the jointly-developed Subaru BRZ/Toyota 86 do not use the SGP, although the platform for the second-generation BRZ/86 has been influenced by SGP.

== Design ==
SGP is the first completely new platform for Subaru since the development of the first generation Legacy in the late 1980s; subsequent Subaru vehicles used a derivative of the original Legacy platform, last significantly renewed with the introduction of the fourth generation Legacy in the early 2000s. The Legacy-derived platform was given the SI chassis (SIシャシー) (SUBARU Intelligent-Chassis) designation in 2007; the 'SI chassis' featured a fully-independent suspension, with front struts and rear double wishbones. SGP retains the same basic front strut/rear wishbone suspension as 'SI chassis', with refinements to improve rigidity.

Fifth-generation Impreza project general manager Kazuhiro Abe stated that moving to SGP was a generational change comparable to the shift from the Leone to the Legacy. The fifth-generation Impreza was developed over four years and at a cost of US$1 billion, a significant fraction of which went to developing SGP. Structural adhesives are used to join the floor panel and side members. Hot rolled steel in the 590 MPa (86 ksi) strength class is used in the side members and sills, and pillars, reinforced with 1,470 MPa (213 ksi) strength class steel to protect the passenger compartment. Subaru claim the SGP enhances vehicle "dynamic feel" with specific benefits to:

1. Straight line stability (due to improvements in rigidity and lowered center of gravity)
2. Noise and vibration control (due to improvements in frame strength and joining processes to increase torsional rigidity)
3. Comfort (due to a reduction in body roll by mounting the rear stabilizer directly to the body)

In addition, both passive and active safety features are improved; SGP has a lower center of gravity, allowing more agile handling and enhancing crash avoidance, and uses high-tensile steel, enabling the structure to absorb 40% more impact energy compared to prior models. SGP is also equipped with pedestrian protection airbags in certain markets. Crash tests of the updated models using SGP led Euro NCAP to declare the Impreza and XV (2017, small family car) and Forester (2019, small off-road/MPV) had performed the best in their respective classes of all automobiles tested in those years. JNCAP also awarded the Impreza, XV, and Forester with its Grand Prix Award for collision safety performance assessment in those years.

SGP was designed to allow different drivetrains to be fitted, including conventional internal combustion engines, hybrid gasoline/electric, and battery-electric. Although initial plans had a future electric car being developed using SGP, Subaru and Toyota announced in June 2019 they would jointly develop a C-segment battery electric SUV on a new platform; in December 2020, Subaru confirmed the forthcoming SUV would be based on the e-TNGA platform instead of SGP.

Production efficiencies for SGP-based models could be realized by manufacturing platform components for different models at the same factory, and the same line could be used to assemble multiple models.

== Applications ==
Vehicles using platform (calendar years):

- Impreza (2016–present)
- XV / Crosstrek (2017–present)
- Ascent (2018–present)
- Forester (2018–present)
- Legacy (2019–2025)
- Outback (2019–present)
- Levorg / WRX Sportswagon / WRX GT (2020–present)
- WRX (2022–present)

The second-generation Subaru BRZ/Toyota GR86, jointly developed with Toyota, uses neither the SGP nor the Toyota New Global Architecture (TNGA) platform, but the "knowledge and techniques" gained from the development of SGP were credited with increasing chassis rigidity and stiffness for the new BRZ. The first-generation BRZ/86 had used an SI chassis-derived platform.

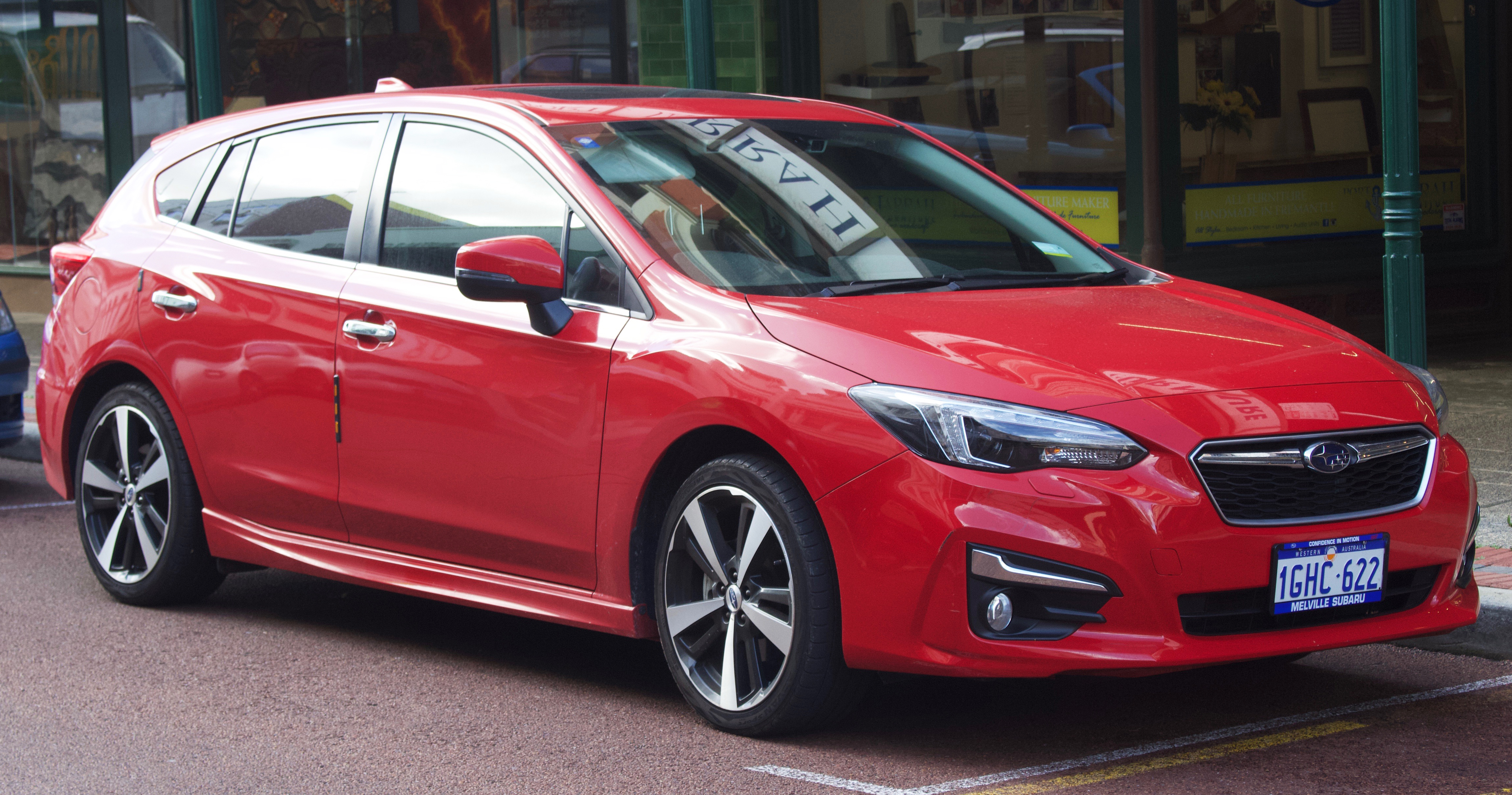
Subaru Impreza (fifth generation)

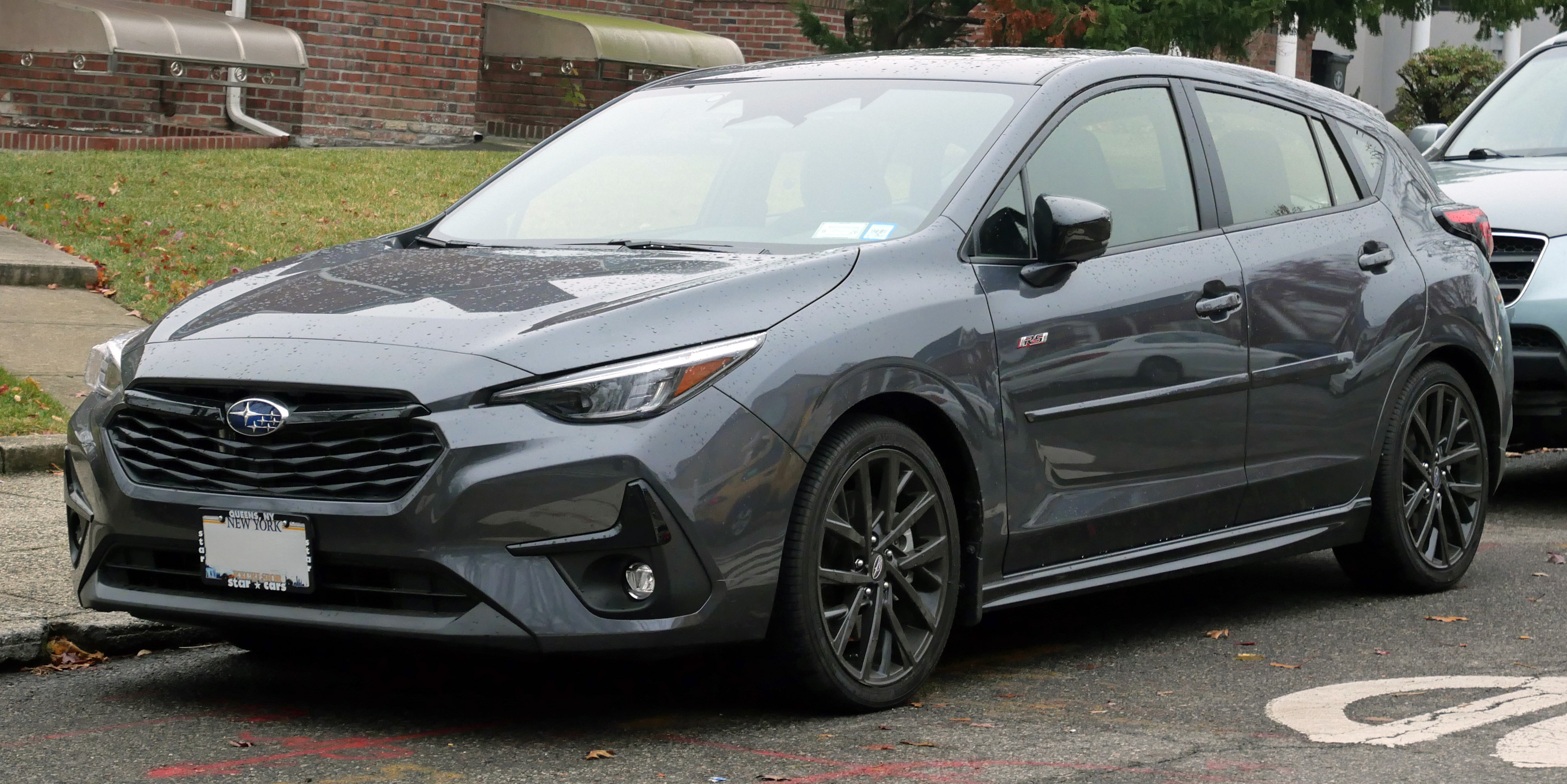
Subaru Impreza (sixth generation)

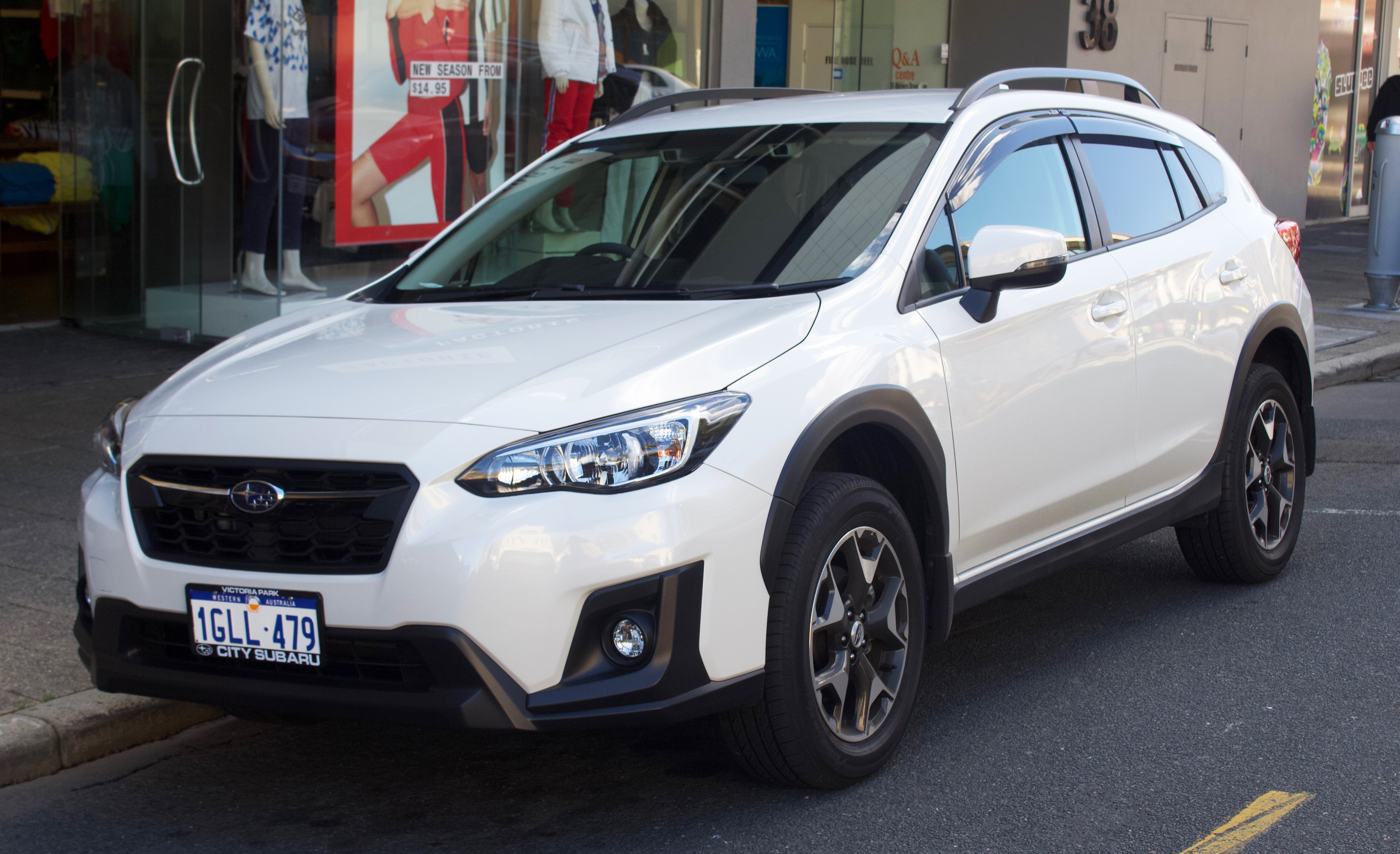
Subaru XV/Crosstrek (second generation)

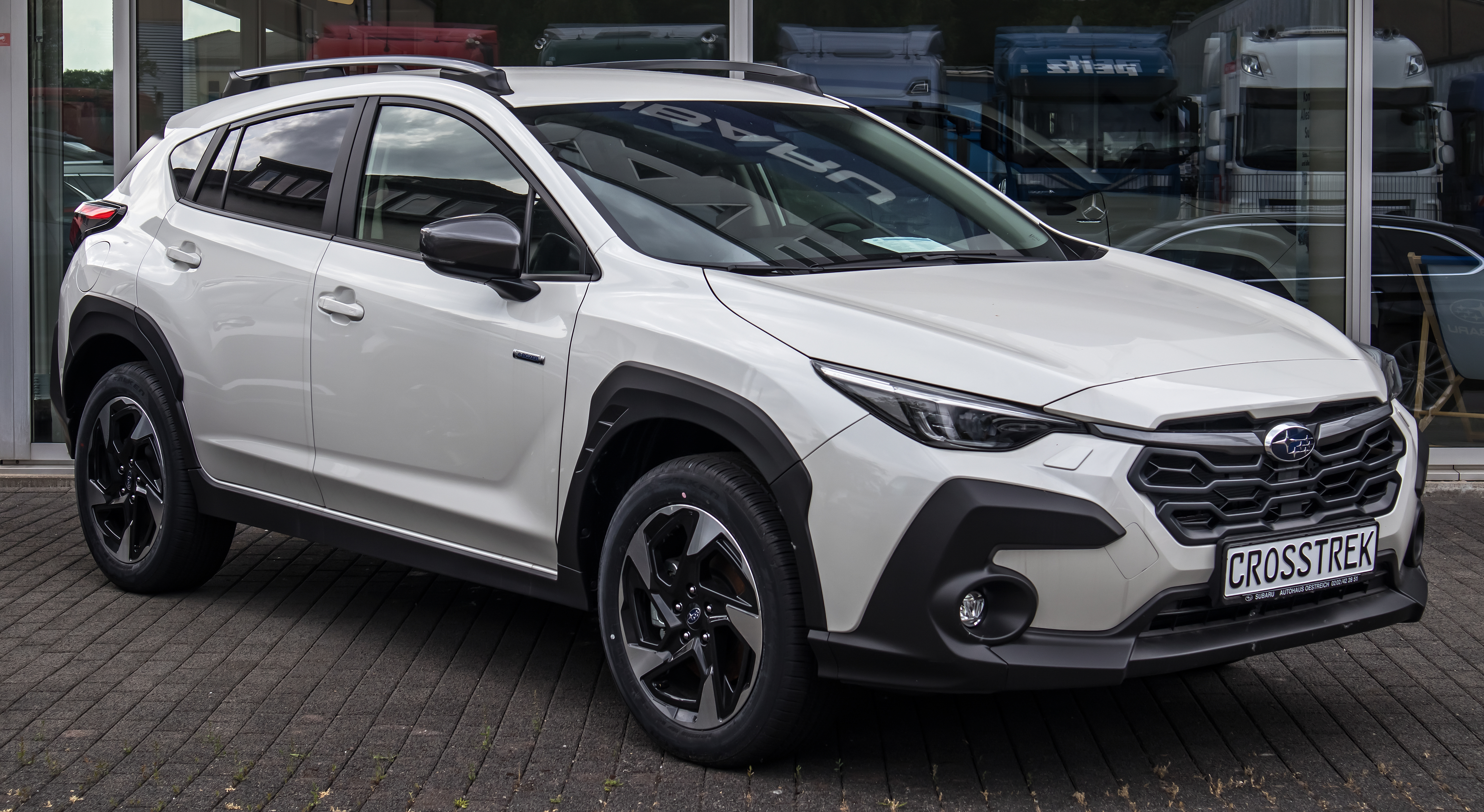
Subaru Crosstrek (third generation)

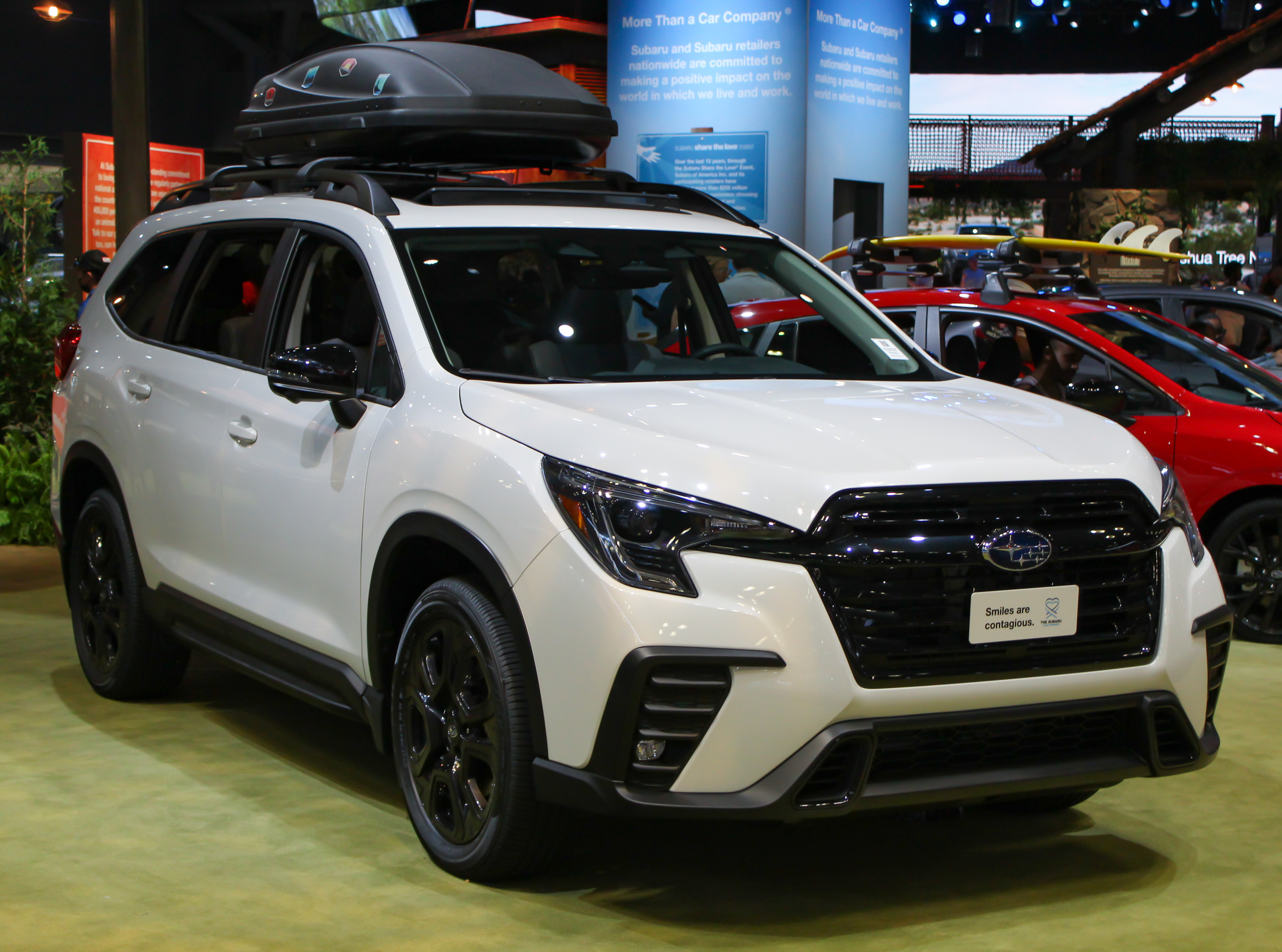
Subaru Ascent

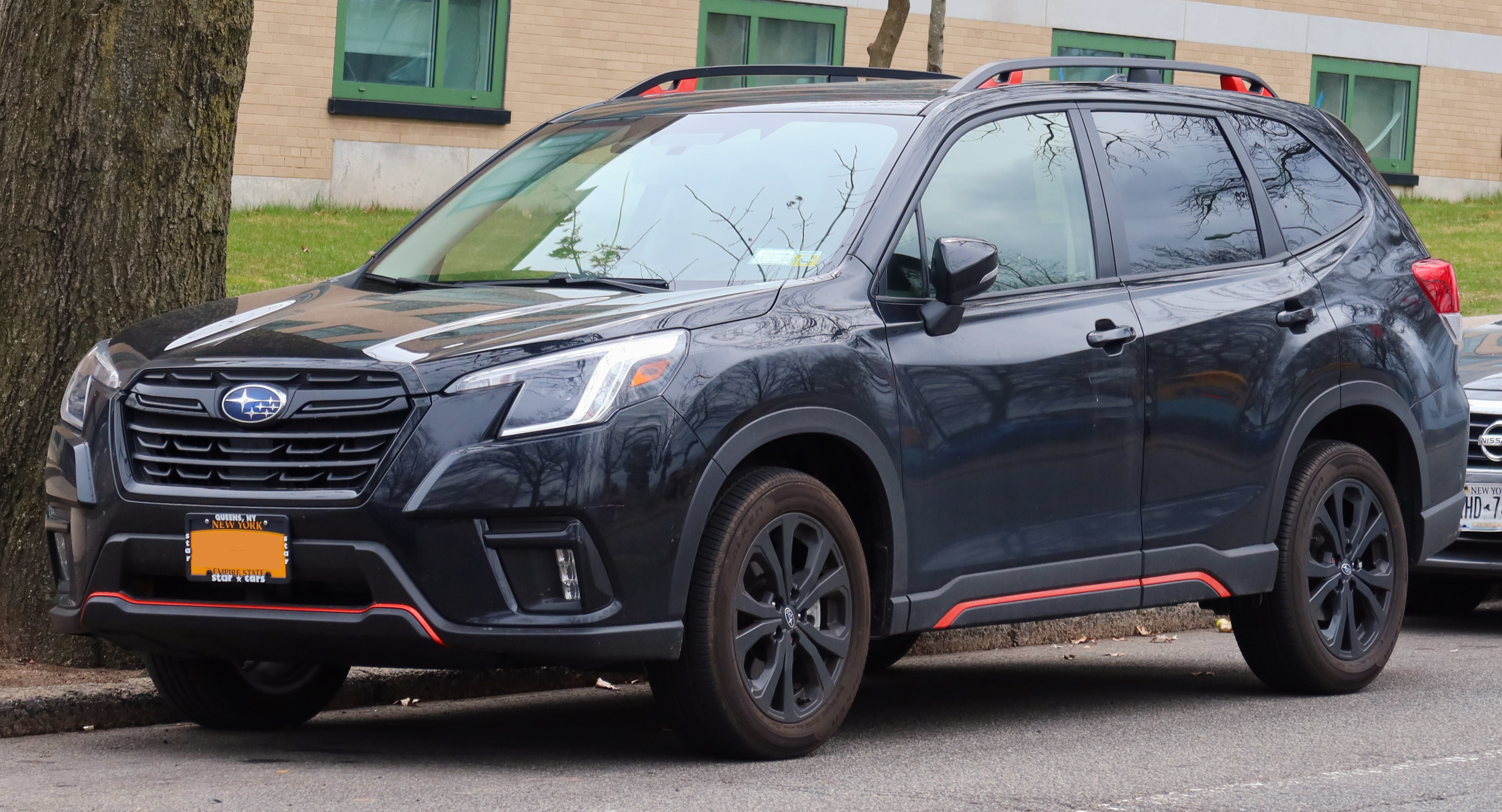
Subaru Forester (fifth generation)

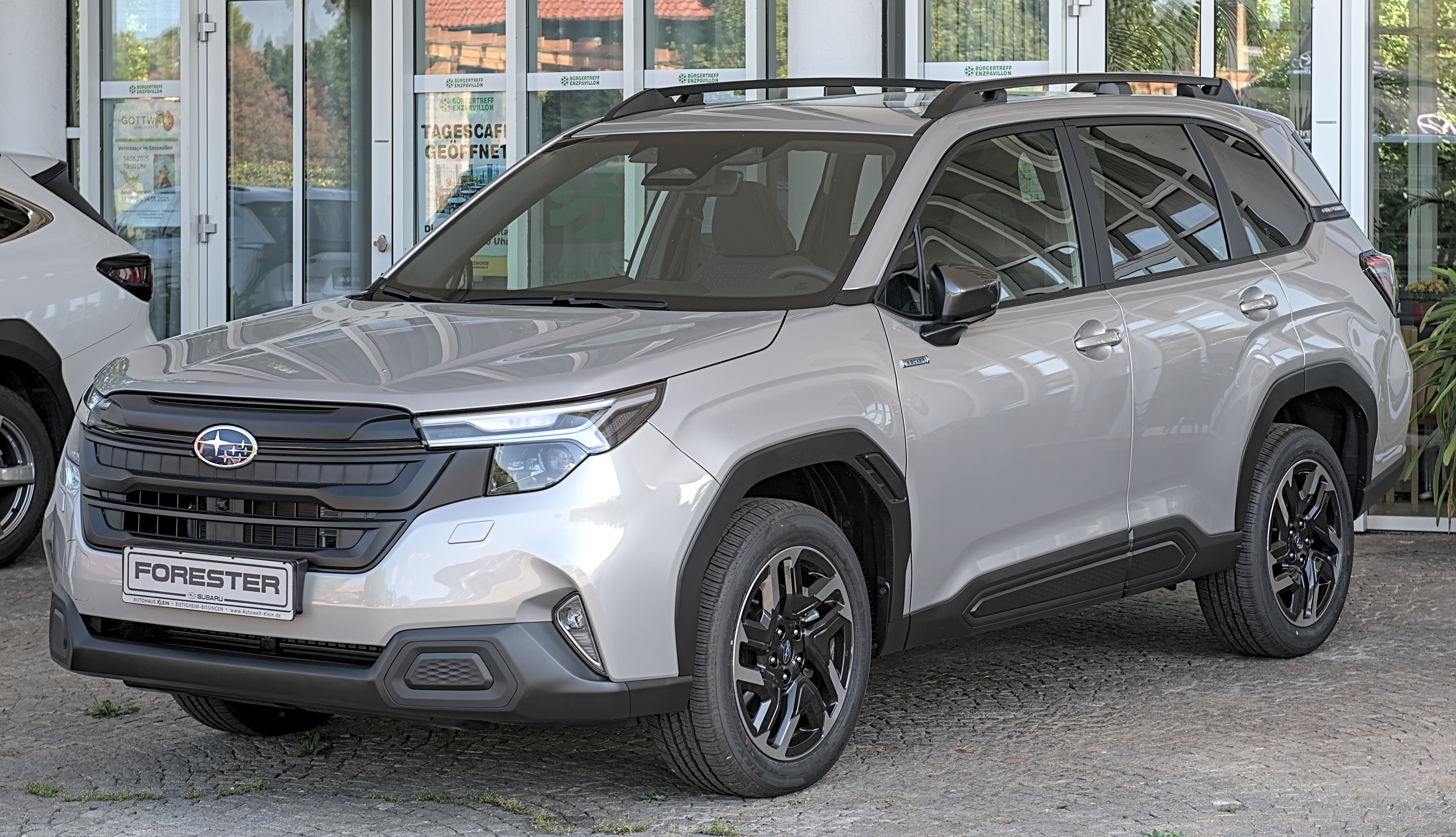
Subaru Forester (sixth generation)

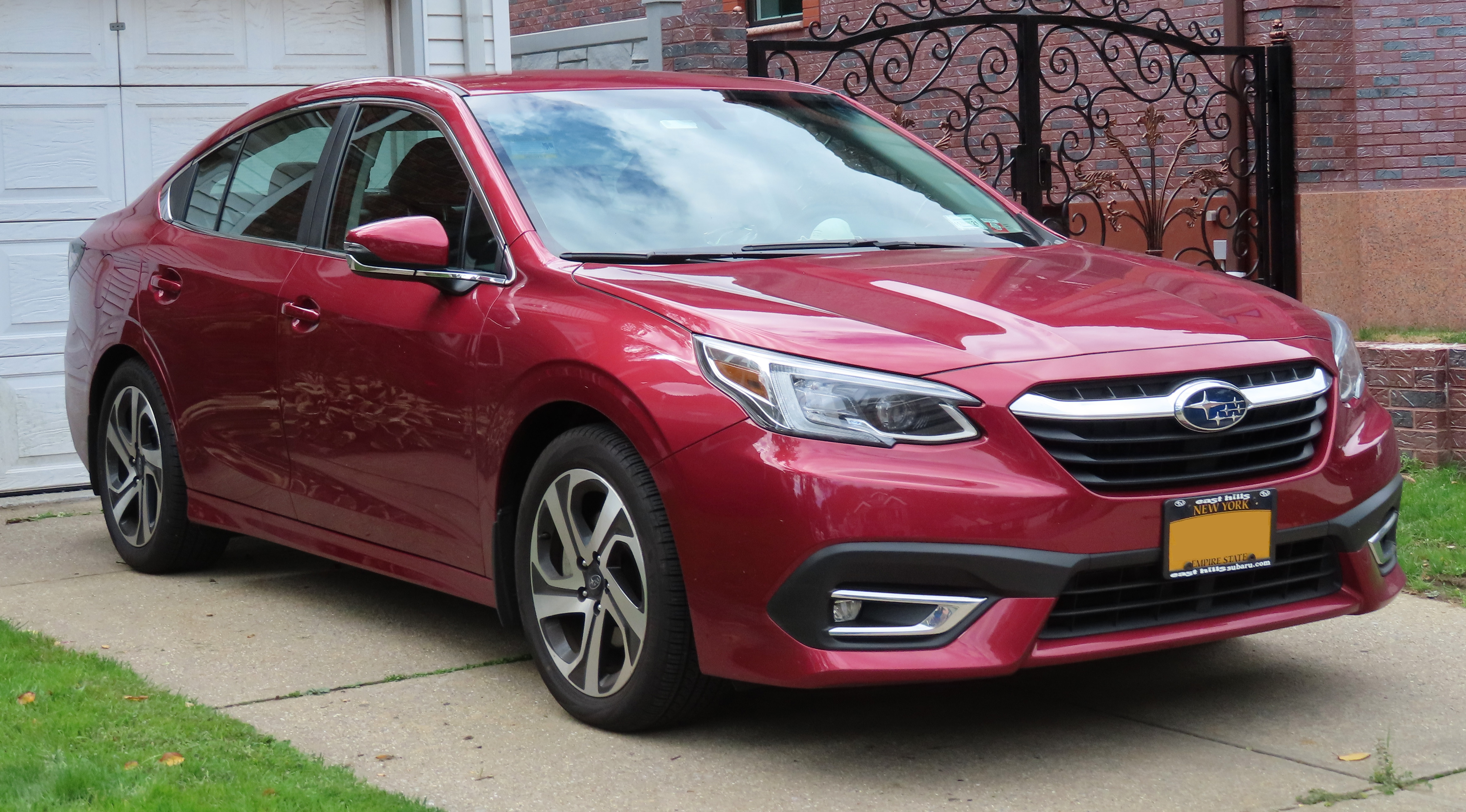
Subaru Legacy (seventh generation)

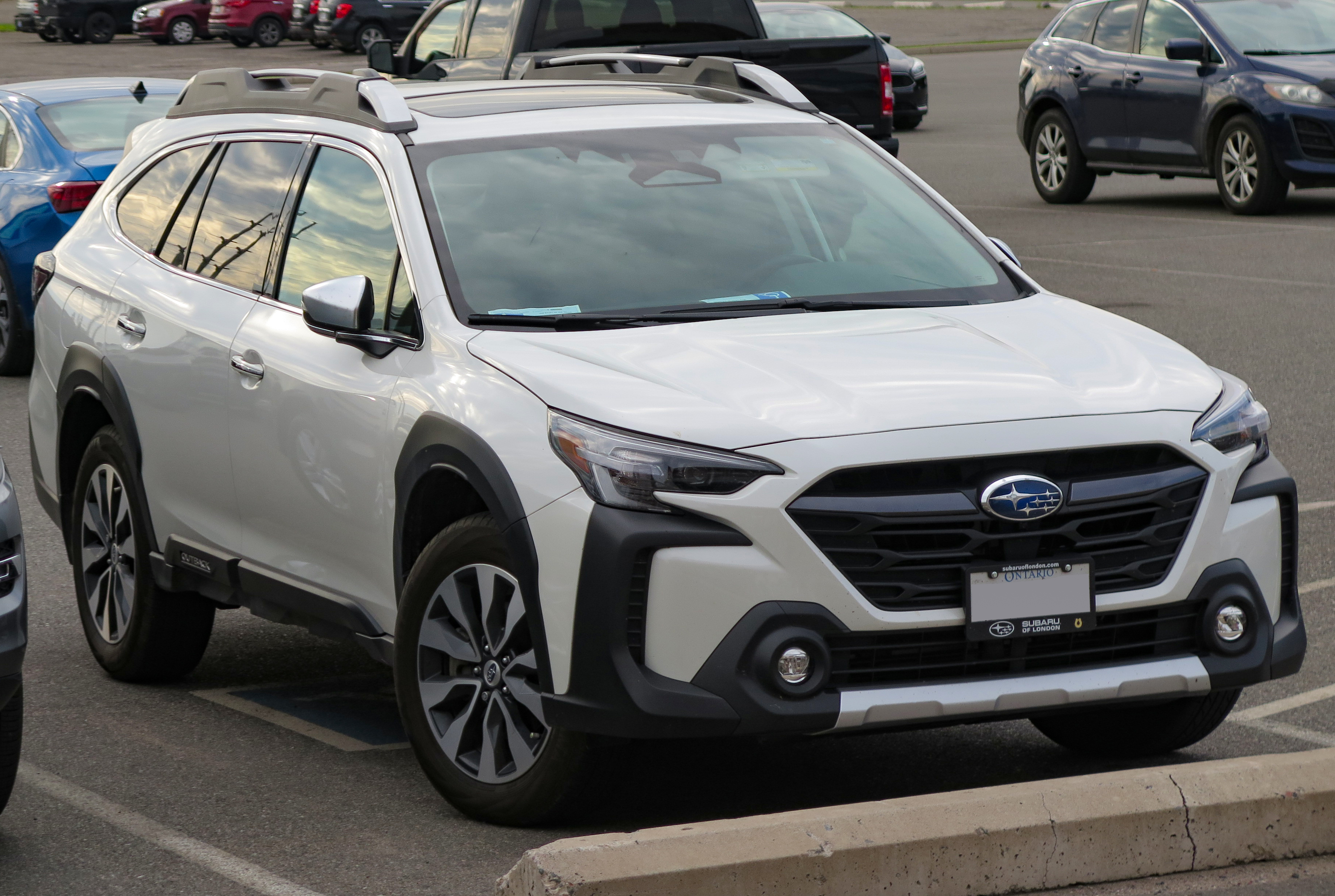
Subaru Outback (sixth generation)

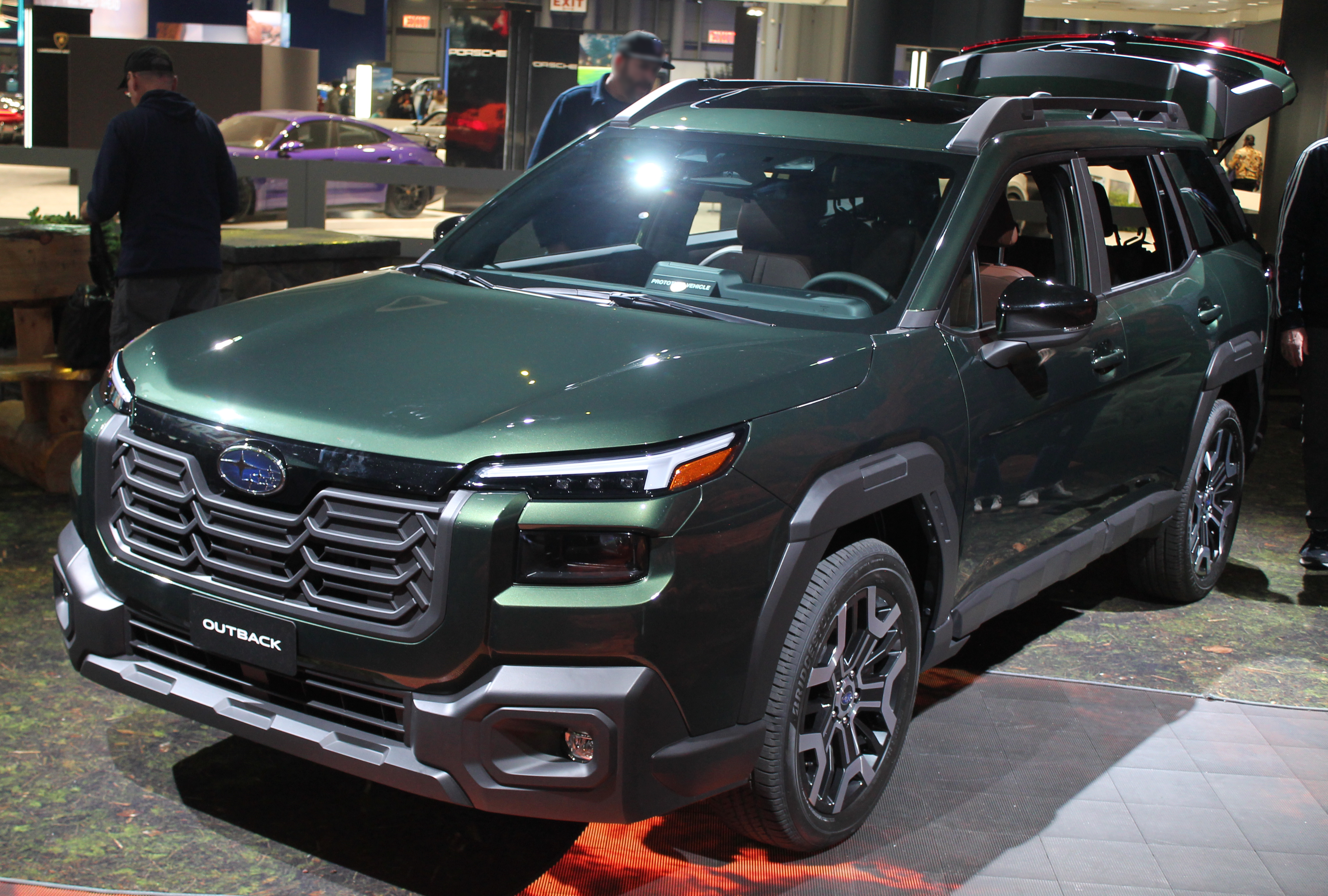
Subaru Outback (seventh generation)

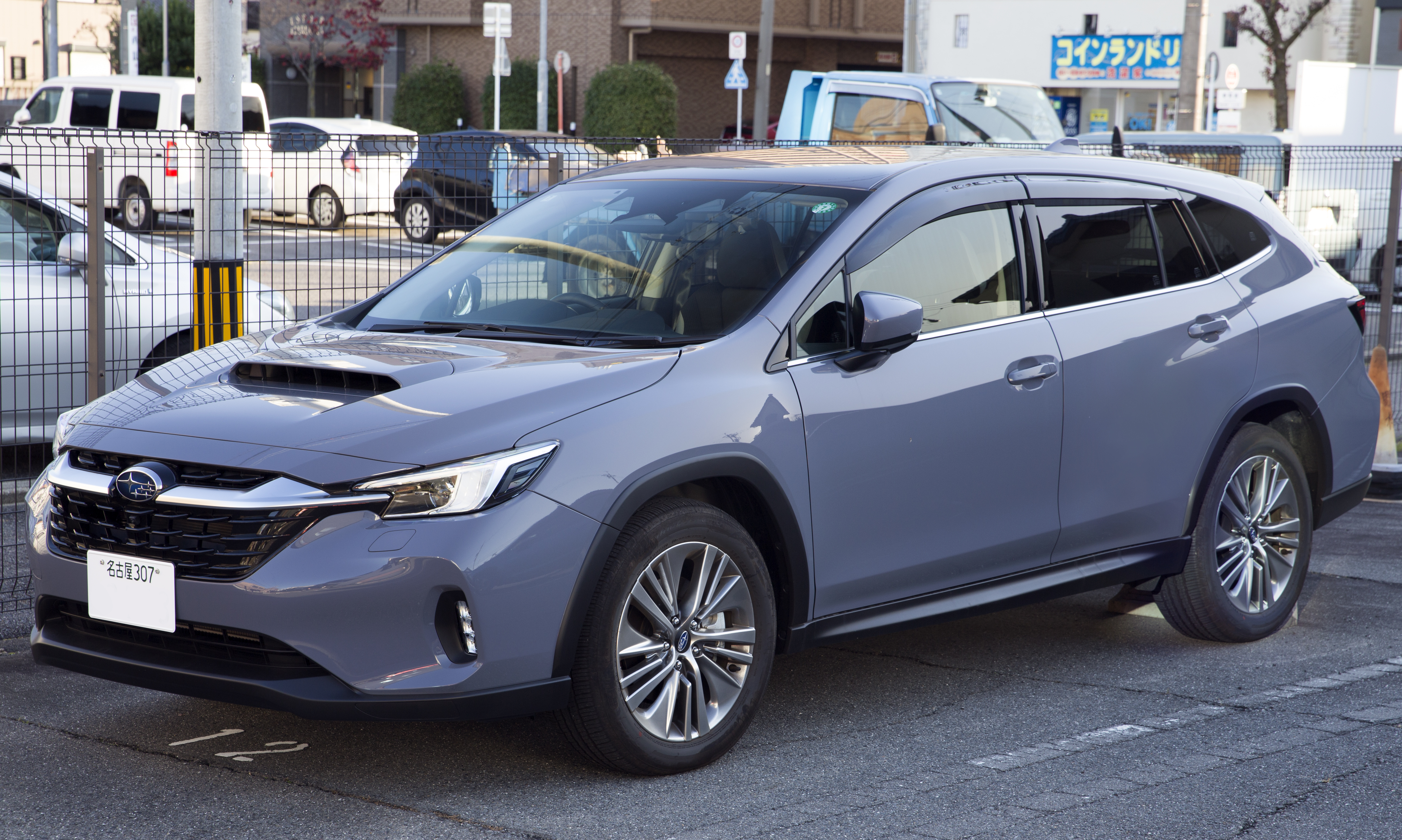
Subaru Levorg Layback

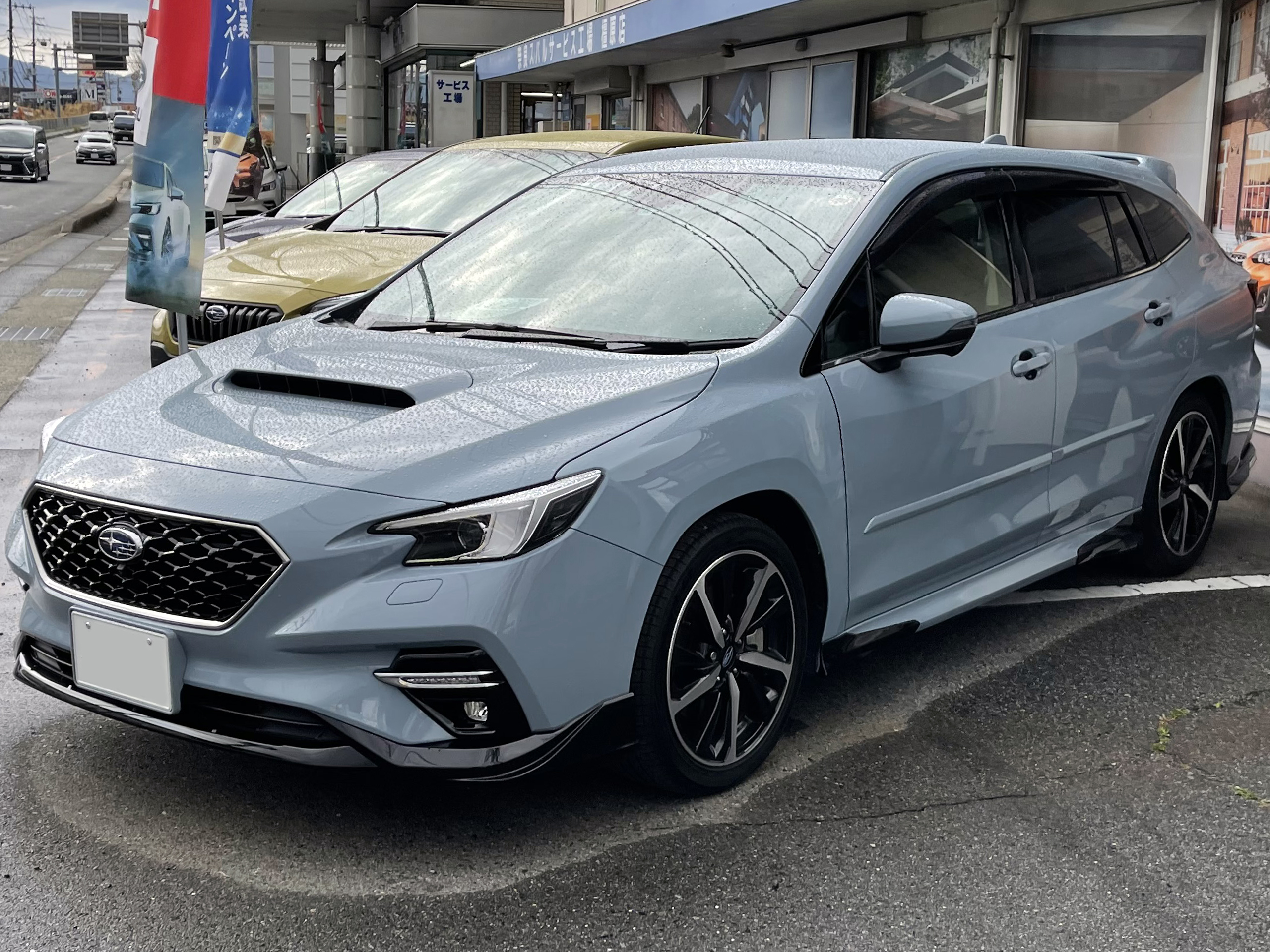
Subaru Levorg (second generation)

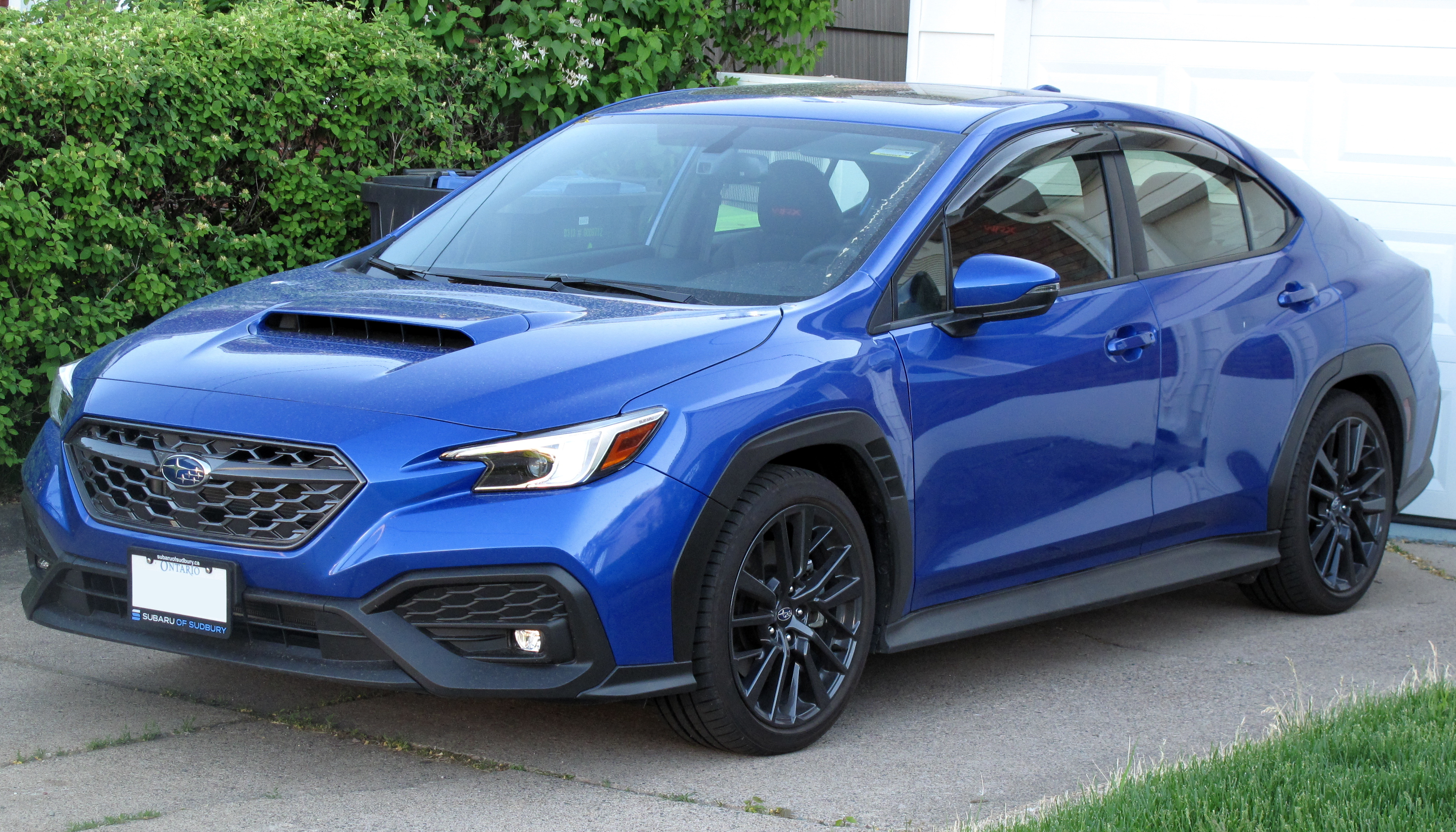
Subaru WRX (second generation)

== See also ==
- Toyota New Global Architecture
