= Subaru Legacy (seventh generation) =

Seventh generation of Subaru Legacy

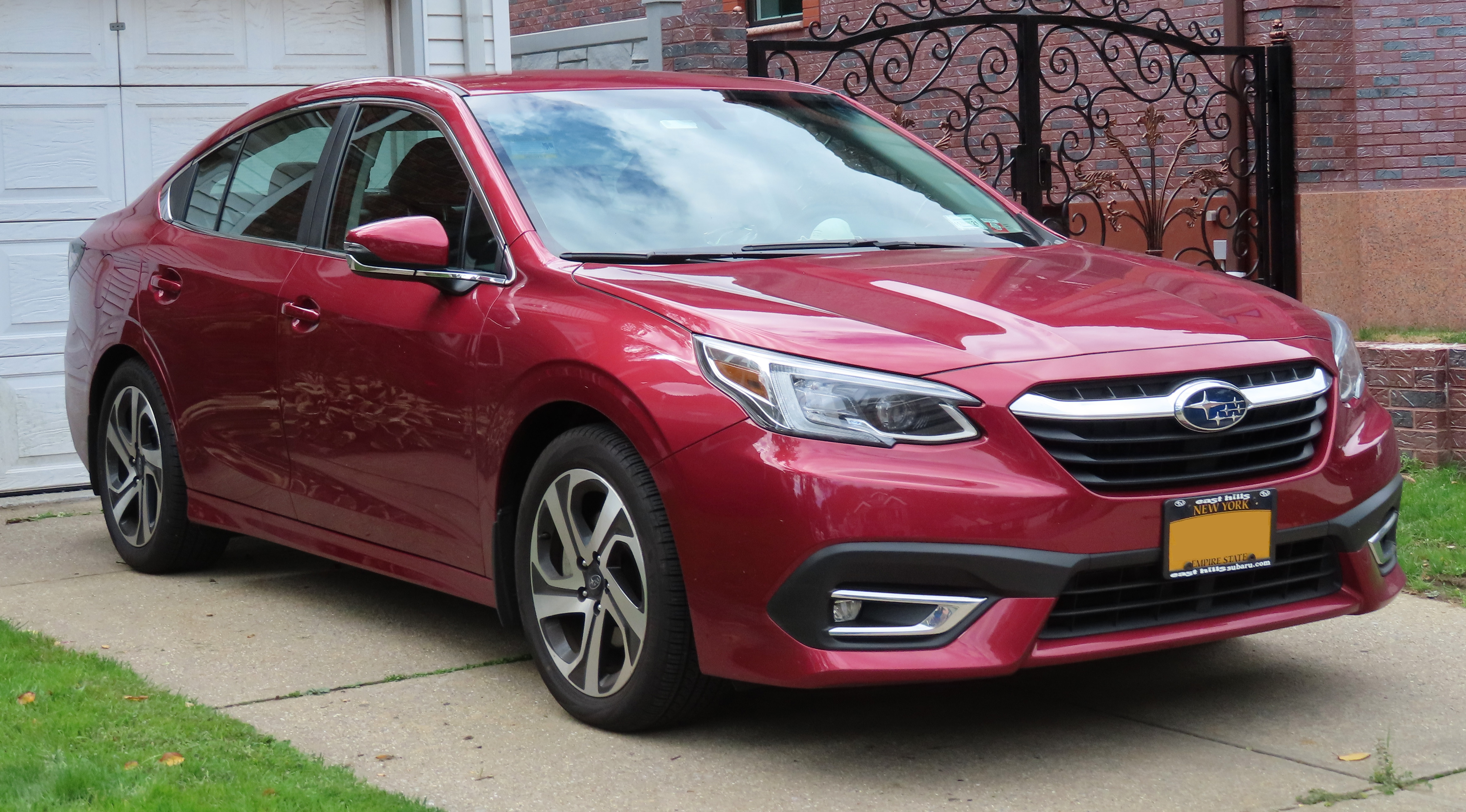
- 2020–2023 Subaru Legacy

Overview
- Manufacturer: Subaru
- Model code: BW
- Production: July 2019 – September 2025
- Model years: 2020–2025
- Assembly: United States: Lafayette, Indiana (SIA)

Body and chassis
- Class: Mid-size car
- Body style: 4-door sedan
- Layout: Front-engine, all-wheel-drive
- Platform: Subaru Global Platform
- Related: Subaru Outback (BT); Subaru Ascent

Powertrain
- Engine: Gasoline: 2.5 L 182 hp (136 kW; 185 PS) FB25 H4; 2.4 L 260 hp (194 kW; 264 PS) FA24F H4-T
- Transmission: Simulated 8-speed Lineartronic CVT

Dimensions
- Wheelbase: 108.3 in (2,750 mm)
- Length: 190.6 in (4,840 mm) (2020–2023); 191.1 in (4,850 mm) (2023–2025)
- Width: 72.4 in (1,840 mm)
- Height: 59.1 in (1,500 mm)
- Curb weight: 3,491–3,790 lb (1,583–1,719 kg)

Chronology
- Predecessor: Subaru Legacy (BN)

The Subaru Legacy (BW) is the seventh generation of the Legacy mid-size sedan. It made its debut at the 2019 Chicago Auto Show on February 7, 2019, and went on sale in the third quarter of 2019 for the 2020 model year.

Unlike previous models, the seventh-generation Legacy was not sold in Japan and Australia due to low sales of its predecessor. The seventh-generation model was built in the United States and sold only in the North America region.

== History ==
Series production of the seventh-generation Legacy and sixth-generation Outback started in July 2019. The first of each model was driven off the SIA production line in Lafayette, Indiana, on July 29.

The seventh-generation Legacy was not marketed in Japan. Orders for the sixth-generation Legacy were accepted through June 22, 2020, and production was discontinued after that date.

== Design ==
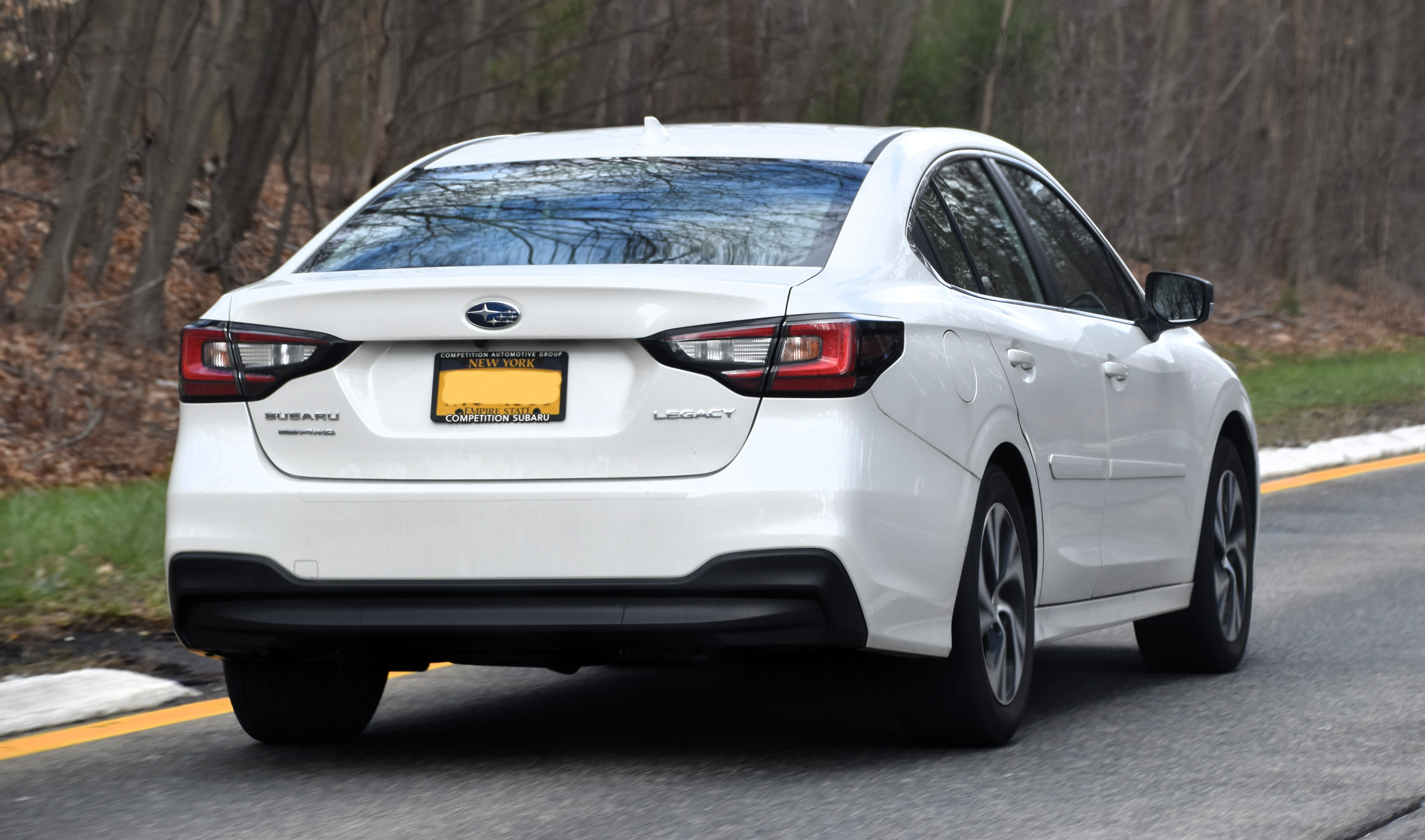
Rear view

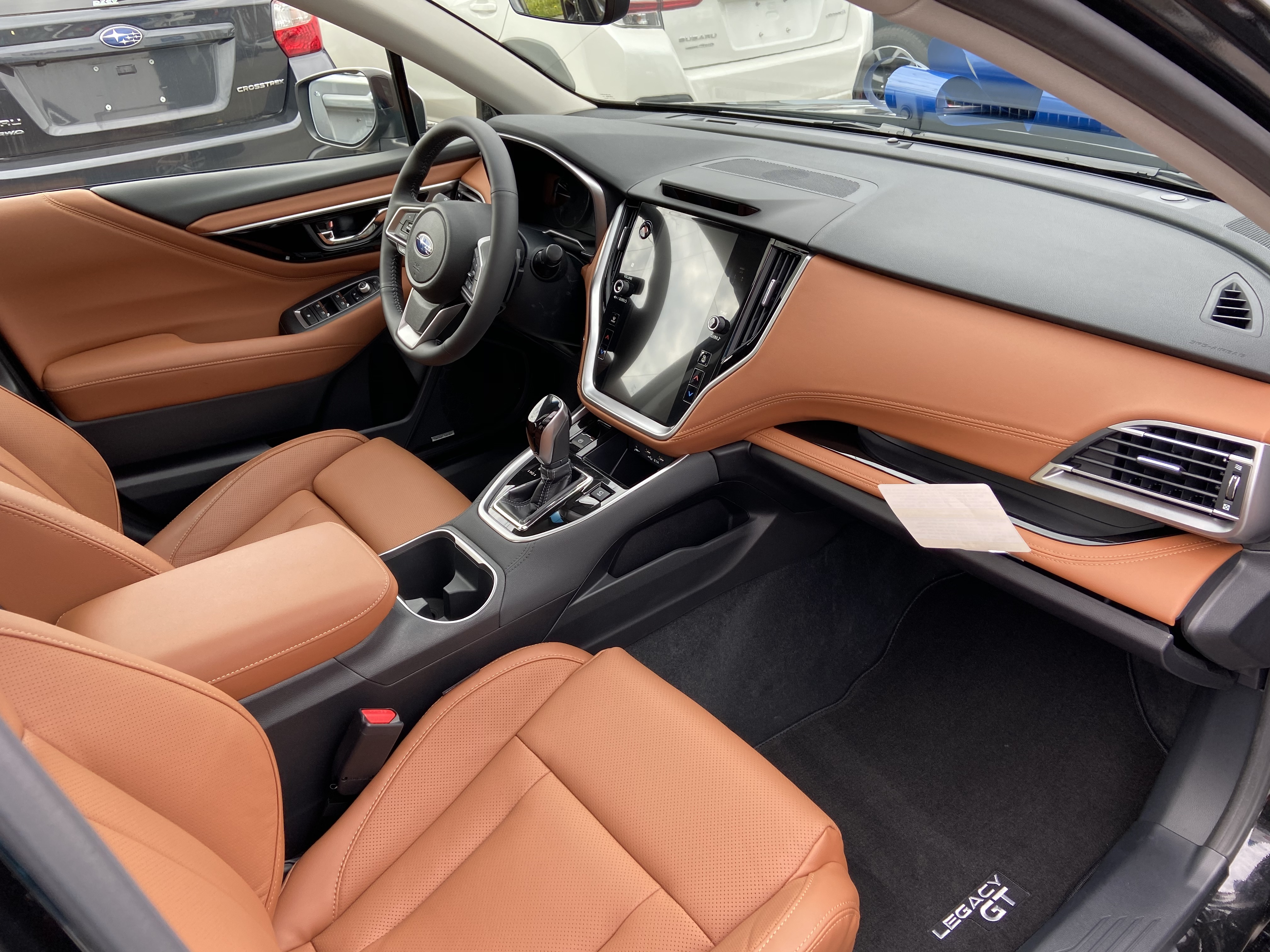
Interior

The seventh-generation Legacy was transitioned to the Subaru Global Platform (SGP), which offered stiffer torsional rigidity compared to the previous generation Legacy. Its exterior styling was similar to the previous generation model, but the headlights and taillights were slightly restyled. The interior now features an 11.6-inch touchscreen on all trims except the base model, which has two 7-inch displays. The screens are manufactured by Denso and shared with the Toyota Prius Prime. There are two separate Denso processors, one drives the infotainment system while the other operates critical vehicle functions.

Some notable mechanical changes include an updated base engine, the FB25 now featuring direct injection, and a turbocharged 2.4-liter FA24F flat four engine from the Ascent for higher trim levels, which replaces the outgoing 3.6-liter EZ36D flat six engine. 90% of the components in the new FB25 are new compared to its predecessor.

In terms of safety, there was a new optional facial recognition system which uses cameras to warn the driver if the system detects that they are distracted or fatigued.

=== Model year changes ===
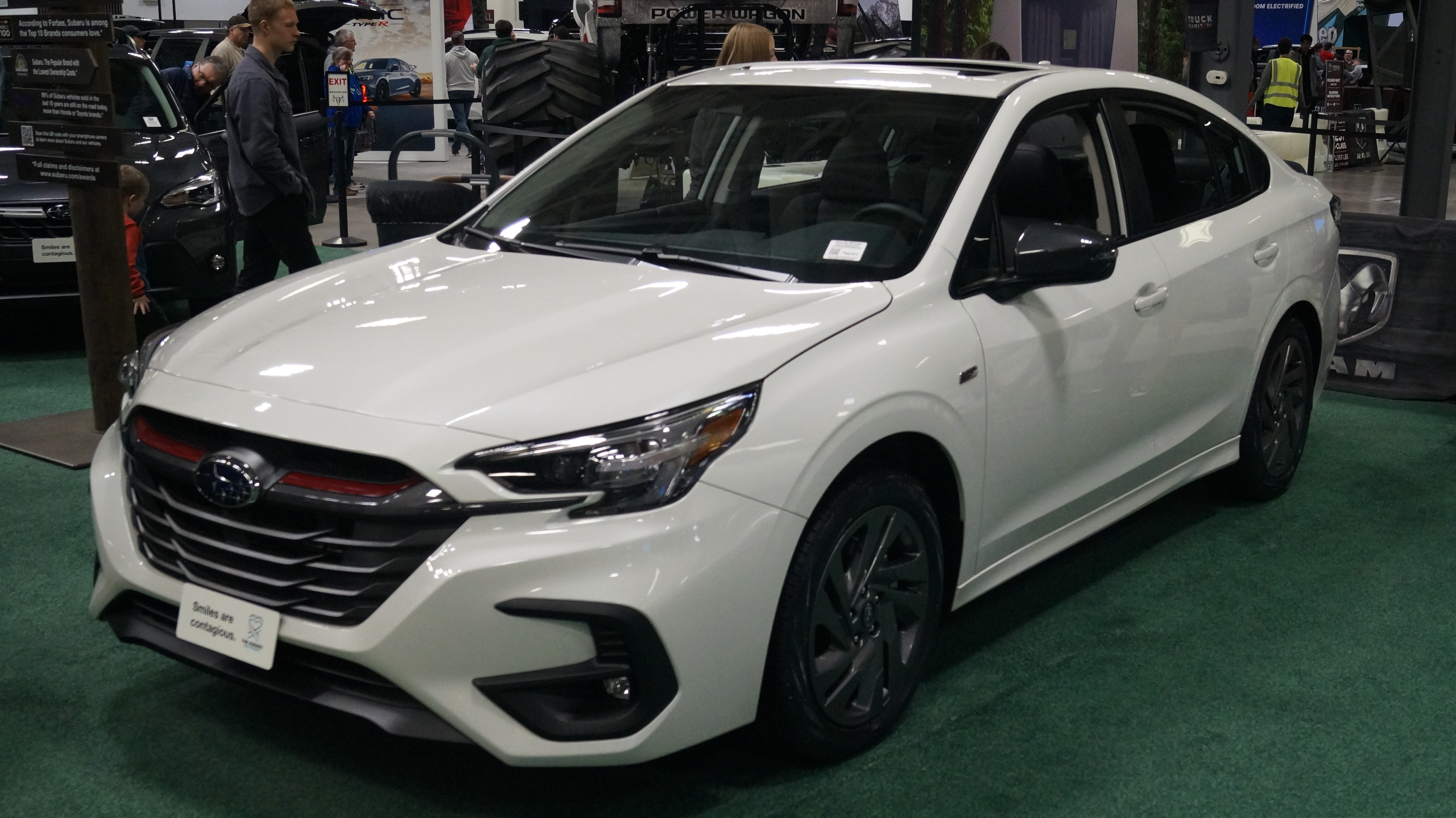
2023–2025 Subaru Legacy

2021: Rear Seat Reminder, Seat Belt Reminder detects passengers in the front and rear seats, and Steering Responsive LED headlights became standard on all trims.

2022: The Base trim became standard with 17-inch black machine-finished alloy wheels (previously an option package). The Premium trim became standard with rear vents in the center console. The Sport trim became standard with a powered moonroof and equipped with safety features such as Blind-Spot Detection with Lane Change Assist, Rear Cross-Traffic Alert, and Reverse Automatic Braking.

2023: The Legacy received a refresh with exterior styling changes such as a redesigned front fascia with new headlights and foglights, a larger grille, and a new front bumper cover. Legacy models equipped with the 11.6-inch Multimedia Plus touchscreen became standard with wireless compatibility for Android Auto and Apple CarPlay and integrated What3words (W3W) global location technology into its navigation system. Several enhancements were made to the EyeSight system, such as a new electric brake booster. A heated steering wheel became standard on the Sport and Touring XT models. The Touring XT model gained a wide-angle mono camera. All models equipped with a blind spot monitor and lane change assist were also equipped with automatic emergency steering, which operated at speeds under 50 mph (80 km/h). The Sport model received 18-inch grey alloy wheels, red accents on the grille, a trunk spoiler, and also became standard with the 2.4-liter turbocharged engine.

2024: The Sport model became standard with the 11.6-inch Multimedia Plus touchscreen and a Harmon Kardon sound system.

2025: The Limited model became standard with an 11.6-inch Multimedia Navigation system, DriverFocus Distraction Mitigation System, heated steering wheel, and powered moonroof.

=== Trim summary ===
United States Legacy key features by trimline
		Base	Premium	Sport (Note: Starting with the 2023 model year, the Sport trim used the 2.4-liter FA24F Turbo.)	Limited	Limited XT	Touring XT
Console	Stereo	7" touchscreen	11.6" touchscreen (navigation optional)			11.6" touchscreen with navigation	
Console	Climate Control	7" touchscreen	11.6" touchscreen (navigation optional)			11.6" touchscreen with navigation	
Audio	Speakers	4	6		12		
Mechanical	Engine	2.5L FB25 DI				2.4L FA24 Turbo	
Mechanical	Transmission	Lineartronic CVT					
Mechanical	Drive	All-wheel drive					
Chassis	Wheel size (in)	17		18			
ADAS	EyeSight	Yes					
ADAS	Blind-Spot Detection	No	Optional		Yes		
ADAS	Driver drowsiness detection	No			Optional	Yes	

== Discontinuation ==
In April 2024, Subaru announced that the Legacy would be discontinued in the spring of 2025, ending its 36-year production run. A year later, the closely related Outback entered a new generation, shifting from a lifted station wagon to a boxier, taller-roofline crossover SUV like the compact Forester.

== Awards and recognition ==
- 2019 Ward's 10 Best User Experiences (Outback)
- 2020 Autotrader's 10 Best Cars for Dog Lovers (Outback)
- Autotrader's Best New Cars for 2020 list (Outback)
- 2020 Good Housekeeping's Best New Family Cars – Best Station Wagon (Outback)
- 2021-2023 Kelley Blue Book's Lowest 5-Year Cost to Own: Mid-size SUV – 2-row (Outback)
- 2024 Consumer Reports' The Most Comfortable Cars You Can Buy
