= Subaru VIZIV =

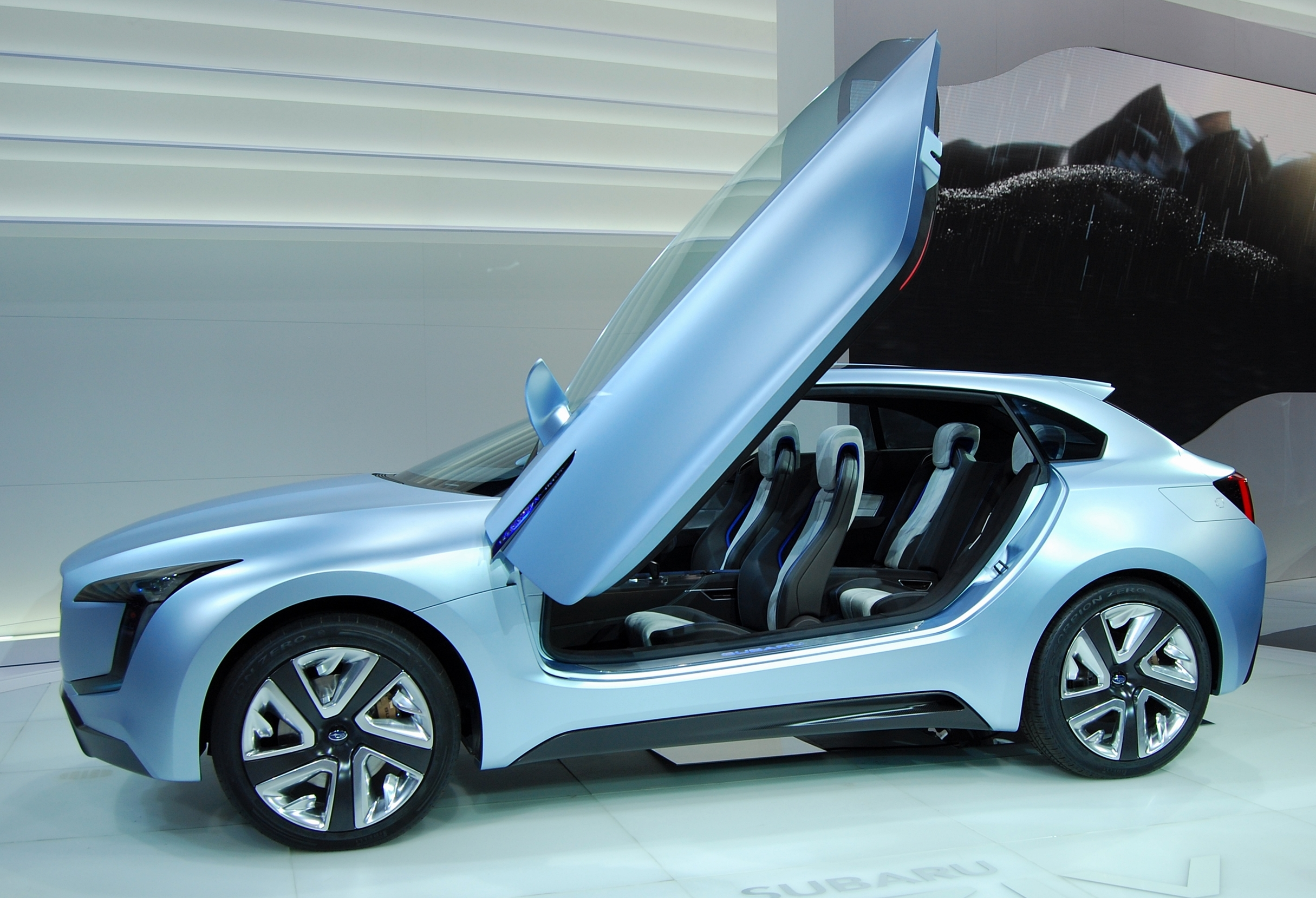
- VIZIV at IAA (Frankfurt) 2013

Overview
- Manufacturer: Subaru
- Model years: 2013

Body and chassis
- Class: Shooting-brake/Subcompact suv
- Body style: 3-door SUV
- Layout: TTR Hybrid - Front engine, front-wheel drive + electrically driven rear wheels
- Doors: Butterfly doors
- Related: VIZIV Evolution

Powertrain
- Engine: 2.0-liter four-cylinder boxer turbocharged diesel
- Electric motor: 2x permanent magnet synchronous
- Transmission: lineartronic CVT
- Hybrid drivetrain: Parallel
- Battery: lithium ion

Dimensions
- Wheelbase: 2,640 mm (103.9 in)
- Length: 4,320 mm (170.1 in)
- Width: 1,900 mm (74.8 in)
- Height: 1,510 mm (59.4 in)

Chronology
- Predecessor: Hybrid Tourer
- Successor: VIZIV 2

The Subaru VIZIV is a series of hybrid concept sports SUVs designed and built by Subaru, the first of which was unveiled at the 2013 Geneva Motor Show. The VIZIV series included several signature Subaru design features, such as the use of horizontally-opposed engines and all-wheel drive, and built on prior Subaru hybrid concepts such as the B9SC, B5-TPH, and Hybrid Tourer by using a three-motor layout. Since 2016, the VIZIV concept cars have previewed styling for upcoming production automobiles, and the hybrid powertrain has been dropped in favor of a conventional gasoline engine and all-wheel-drive.

== Design ==
The name "VIZIV" was derived from the phrase "Vision for Innovation" and was meant to illustrate the Subaru concept of "enjoyment and peace of mind." The VIZIV concept was also meant to suggest the brand's future styling direction, and the hexagonal grille was reused in November 2013 for the Legacy Concept revealed at the Los Angeles Auto Show.

=== VIZIV (2013) ===
The VIZIV CONCEPT had its world premiere at the Geneva Motor Show in March 2013. The 2013 VIZIV features a hexagonal grille standing proud of the body (and echoed in the rear panel) intended to serve as a future Subaru design feature.

The use of electric motors for the rear wheels eliminates the need for a mechanical power shaft from the front-mounted engine, allowing the interior floor to be lower and flatter.

=== VIZIV Evolution (2013) ===
Subaru VIZIV Evolution
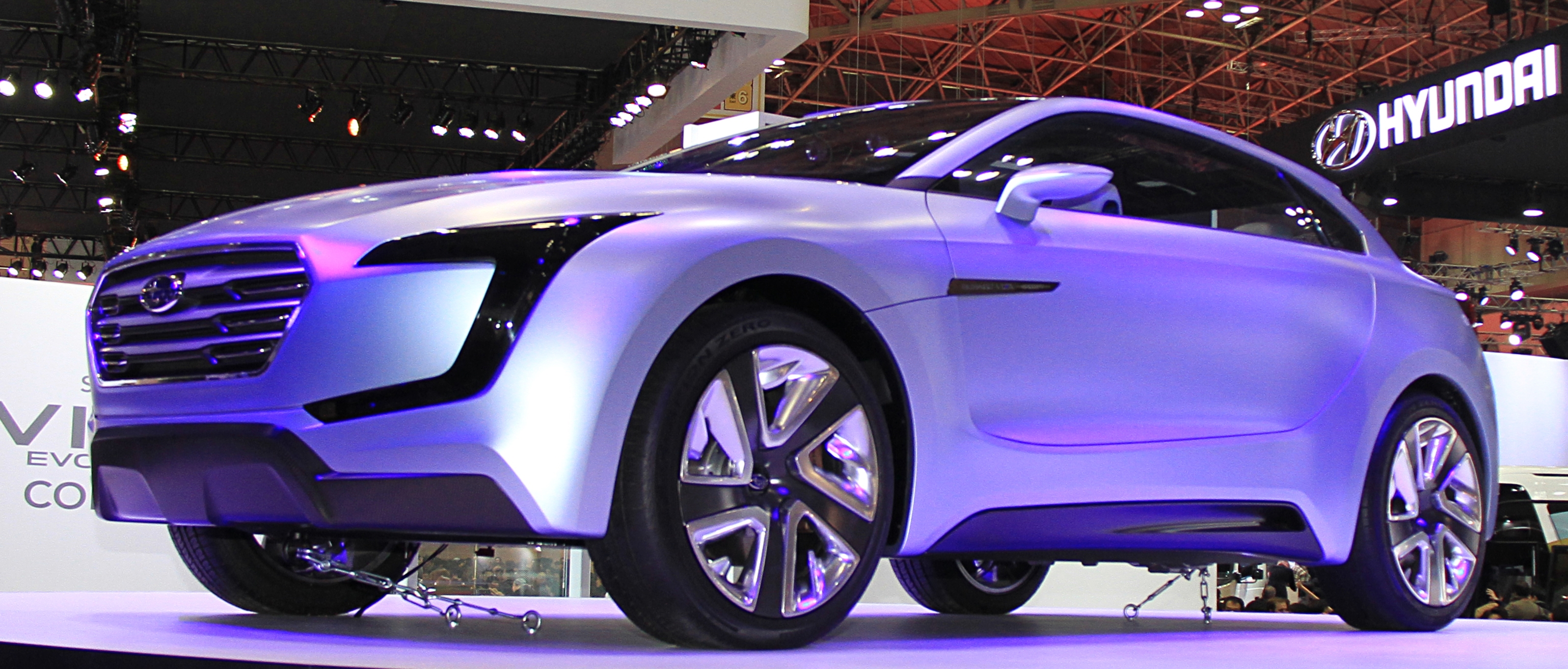
- VIZIV Evolution at Tokyo Motor Show (2013)

Powertrain
- Engine: 1.6-liter H4 DIT

Chronology
- Predecessor: VIZIV
- Successor: VIZIV 2

The VIZIV EVOLUTION debuted at the Tokyo Motor Show in October 2013 with the same layout and external dimensions as the 2013 Geneva VIZIV, but with a smaller (1.6-litre) direct injection turbo (DIT). The Subaru Levorg was also introduced at Tokyo Motor Show 2013 with a 1.6L DIT (later designated the FB16 DIT), but it was not confirmed they used the same engine.

=== VIZIV 2 (2014) ===
Subaru VIZIV 2
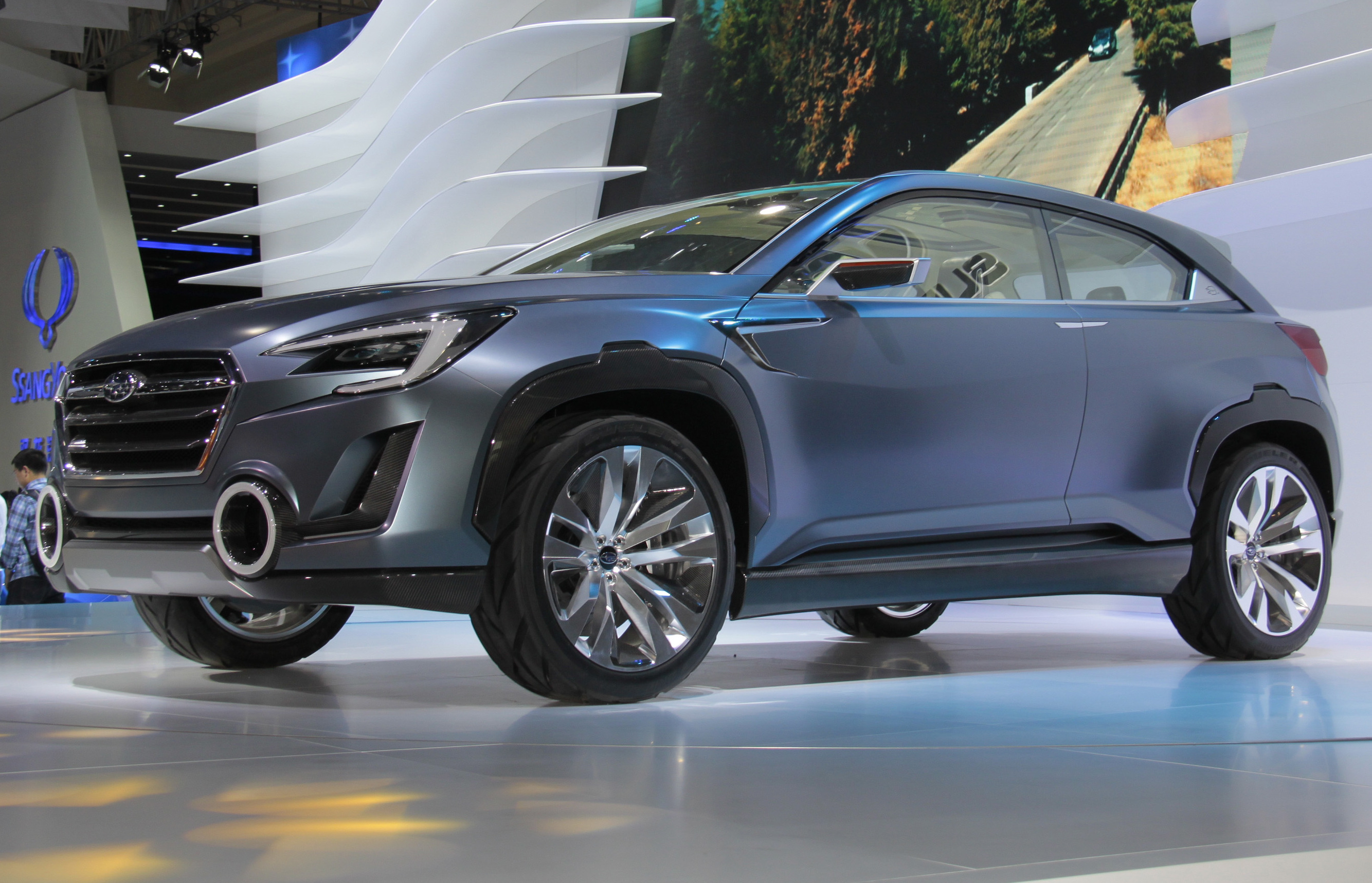
- VIZIV 2 at Auto China (2014)

Overview
- Model years: 2014

Body and chassis
- Class: concept
- Body style: 5-door SUV
- Doors: Butterfly doors (front); Sliding doors (rear)

Powertrain
- Engine: 1.6-liter H4 DIT

Dimensions
- Wheelbase: 2,730 mm (107.5 in)
- Length: 4,435 mm (174.6 in)
- Width: 1,920 mm (75.6 in)
- Height: 1,530 mm (60.2 in)

Chronology
- Predecessor: VIZIV, VIZIV Evolution
- Successor: VIZIV Future Concept

One year later, the VIZIV 2 debuted at Geneva in March 2014, featuring the smaller 1.6-litre direct-injection turbo engine from the VIZIV EVOLUTION in a slightly larger body with four doors. The shape of the headlamps was intended to evoke the horizontally opposed engine.

=== VIZIV Future Concept (2015) ===
Subaru VIZIV Future Concept
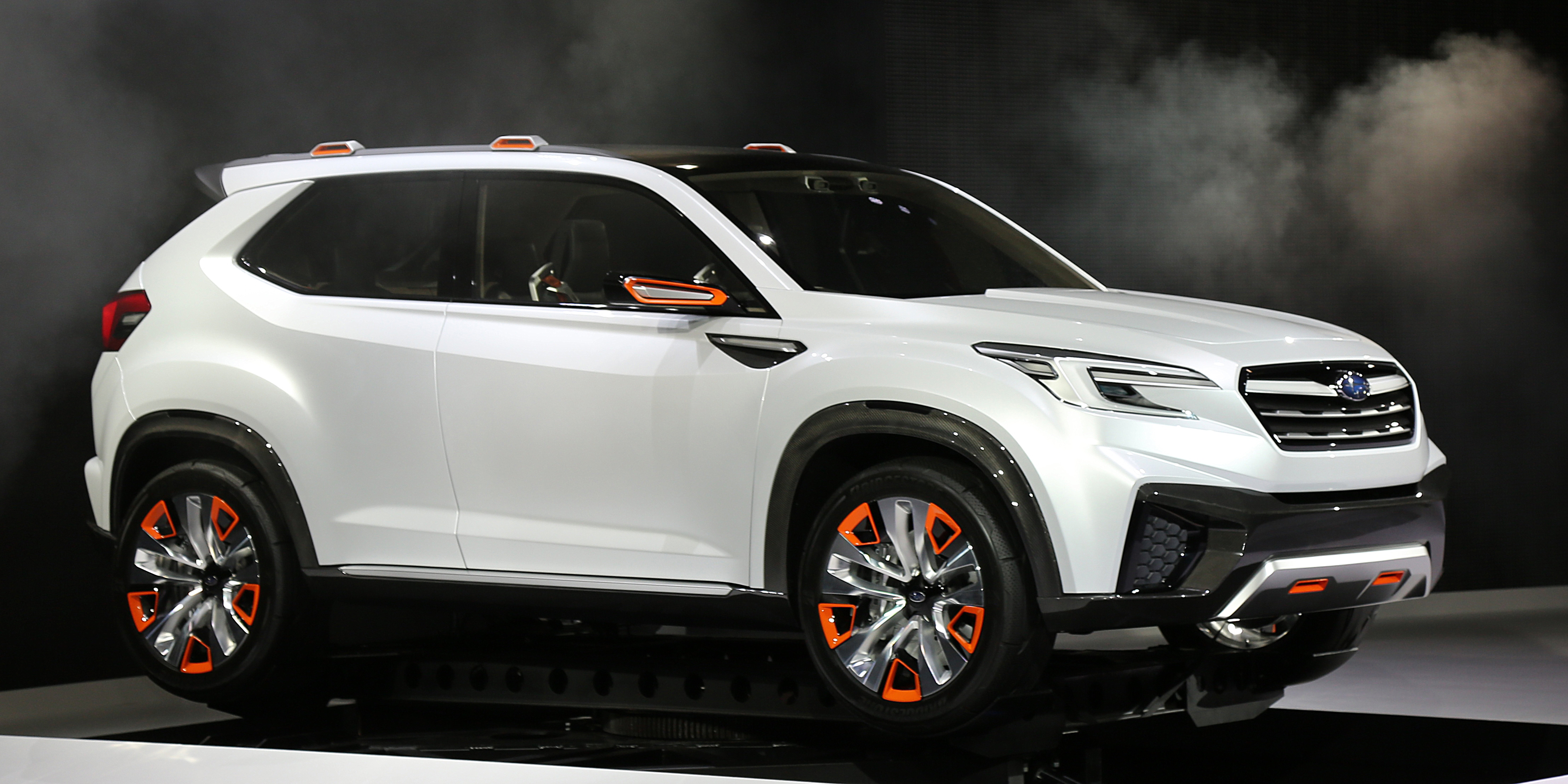
- VIZIV Future Concept at TMS (2015)

Overview
- Model years: 2015

Body and chassis
- Doors: Conventional doors (front); Sliding doors (rear)

Powertrain
- Engine: 1.6-liter H4 FB16 DIT

Chronology
- Predecessor: VIZIV 2
- Successor: VIZIV-7

The VIZIV Future Concept had its world premiere at the Tokyo Motor Show in October 2015. It dropped the independent rear motors in favor of a single rear motor. The Future Concept uses an evolution of the FB16 DIT 1.6-litre direct-injection turbo first introduced in the Subaru Levorg for 2013.

=== VIZIV-7 (2016) ===
Subaru VIZIV-7

Overview
- Model years: 2016

Body and chassis
- Layout: Front engine, all-wheel drive
- Related: Subaru Ascent

Dimensions
- Wheelbase: 2,990 mm (117.7 in)
- Length: 5,200 mm (204.7 in)
- Width: 2,030 mm (79.9 in)
- Height: 1,860 mm (73.2 in)

Chronology
- Predecessor: VIZIV Future Concept
- Successor: VIZIV Performance Concept

A VIZIV-7 midsize SUV concept was revealed at the 2016 Los Angeles Auto Show, using styling cues but not the hybrid powertrain from prior VIZIV concepts. The VIZIV-7 is a three-row vehicle intended to show the size and styling of a future Tribeca replacement for the North American market, to debut in 2018. An updated, smaller Subaru Ascent Concept was unveiled at the 2017 New York International Auto Show, where Subaru confirmed plans to sell the Ascent by 2018.

=== VIZIV Performance Concept (2017) ===
Subaru VIZIV Performance Concept Subaru VIZIV Performance Concept STI
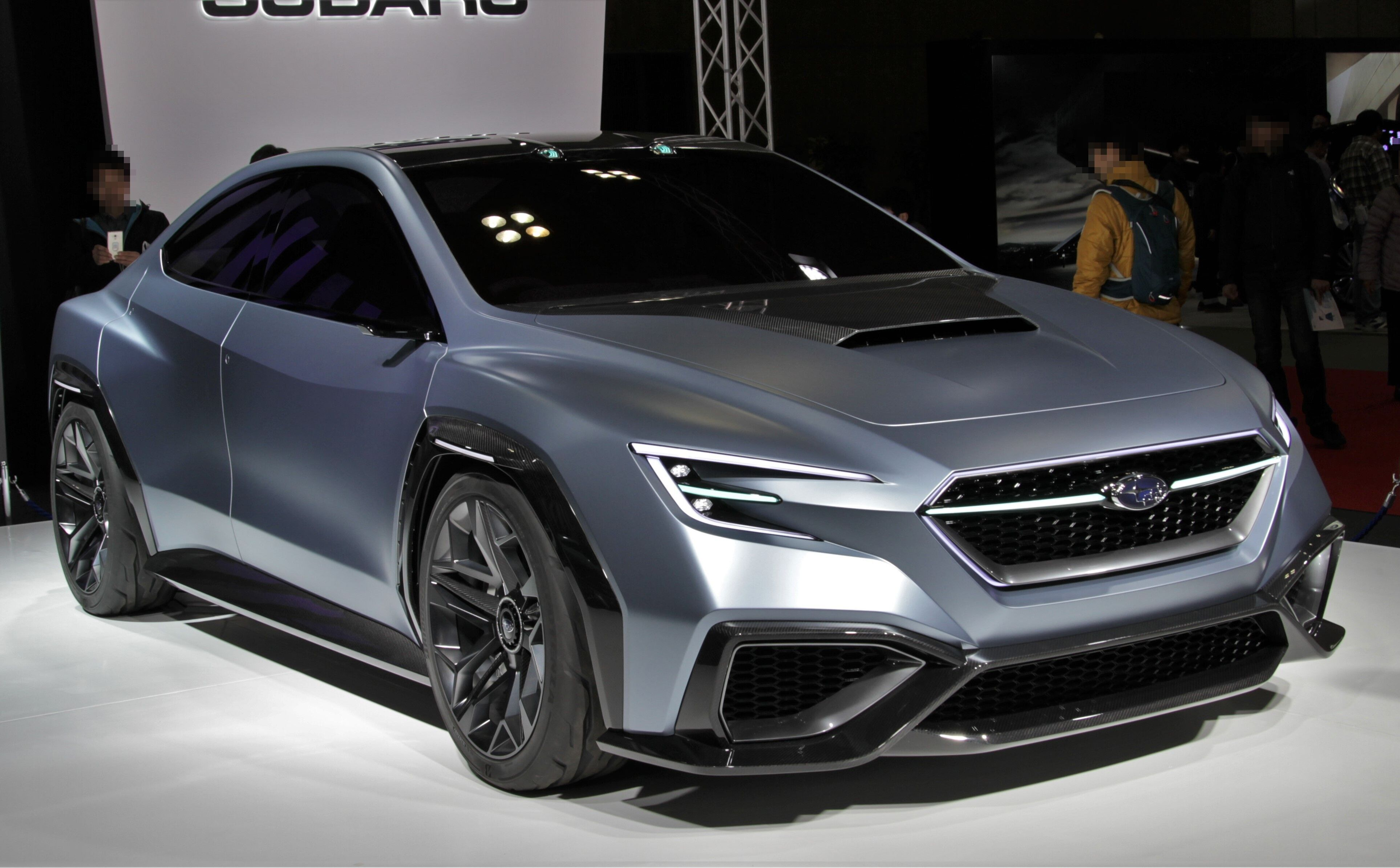
- Performance Concept at Nagoya (2017)

Overview
- Model years: 2017

Body and chassis
- Body style: 4-door sedan
- Layout: Front engine, all-wheel drive
- Related: Subaru WRX (2022)

Dimensions
- Wheelbase: 2,730 mm (107.5 in)
- Length: 4,630 mm (182.3 in)
- Width: 1,950 mm (76.8 in)
- Height: 1,430 mm (56.3 in)

Chronology
- Predecessor: VIZIV-7
- Successor: VIZIV Tourer Concept

The VIZIV Performance Concept was unveiled at the 2017 Tokyo Motor Show. Subaru did not release details of the concept car's powertrain, except to say it "embodies the Subaru powertrain, which is part of the brand's identity". This led automotive news writers to speculate the next-generation WRX could be based on the VIZIV Performance Concept.

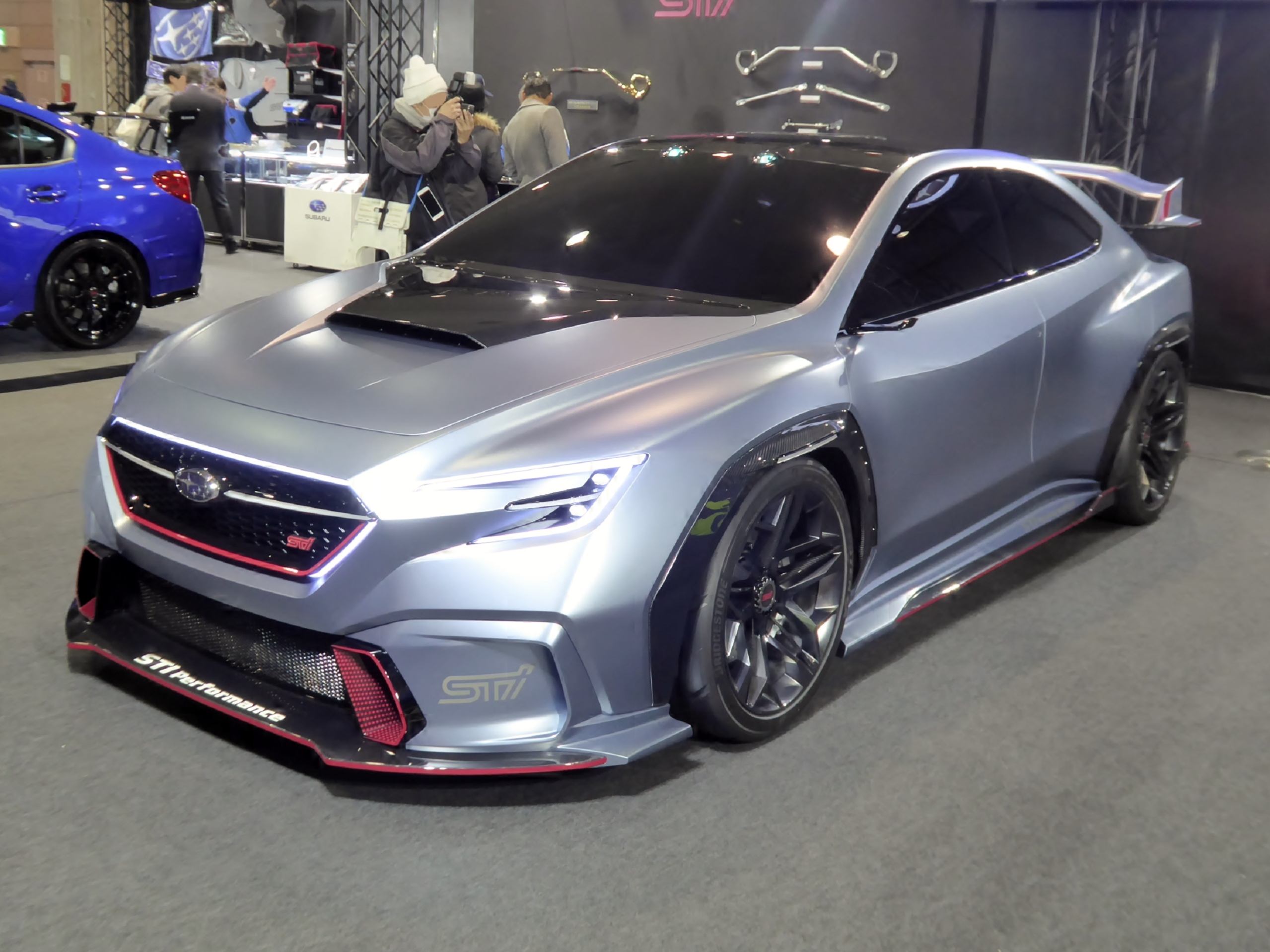
VIZIV Performance STI Concept (2018)

An updated VIZIV Performance STI Concept was shown at the Tokyo Auto Salon in January 2018. Because Subaru did not release details about the car's powertrain, changes appear to be limited to the concept's exterior, which gains a rear spoiler and skirts along with carbon fiber accents.

=== VIZIV Tourer Concept (2018) ===
Subaru VIZIV Tourer Concept
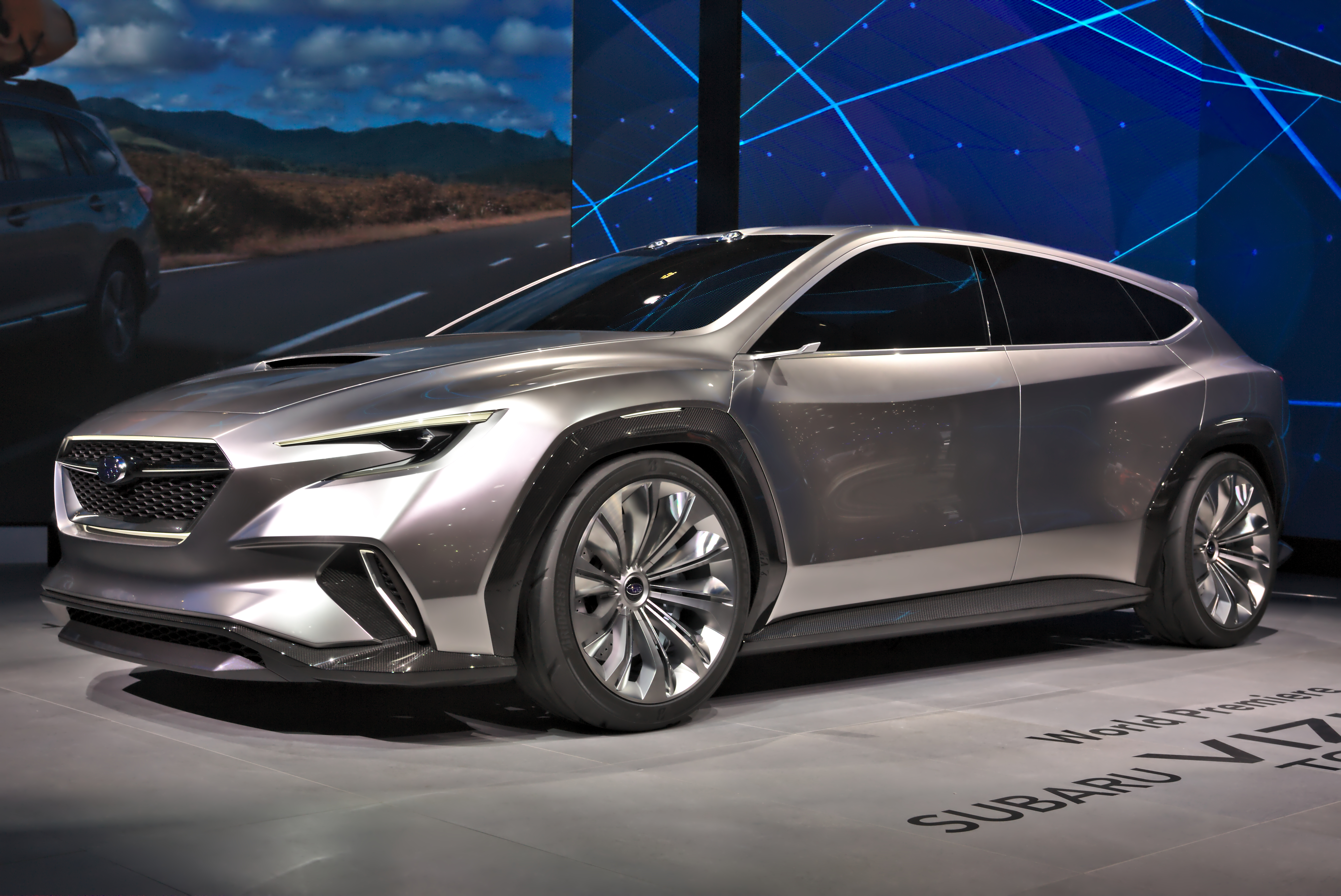
- VIZIV Tourer Concept at Geneva (2018)

Overview
- Model years: 2018

Body and chassis
- Body style: 5-door hatch Station wagon
- Layout: Front engine, all-wheel drive
- Related: Subaru Levorg II

Dimensions
- Wheelbase: 2,730 mm (107.5 in)
- Length: 4,775 mm (188.0 in)
- Width: 1,930 mm (76.0 in)
- Height: 1,435 mm (56.5 in)

Chronology
- Predecessor: VIZIV Performance Concept, Performance Concept STI
- Successor: VIZIV Adrenaline

The VIZIV Tourer Concept was unveiled at the 88th Geneva International Motor Show on March 6, 2018. The VIZIV Tourer Concept is a five-door hatchback showcasing "Subaru's wealth of expertise in offering driver performance, practicality, and safety to deliver new value in a tourer form" and features Subaru's latest developments in automated driving technologies. Dimensions are comparable to the earlier Performance Concept, with seating capacity for four. The powertrain is mentioned briefly as "a boxer engine" with no indication whether hybrid technologies are used as in prior VIZIV concepts. Press coverage speculated the Tourer Concept could preview styling for a future WRX wagon/hatch or Levorg.

=== VIZIV Adrenaline Concept (2019) ===
Subaru VIZIV Adrenaline Concept
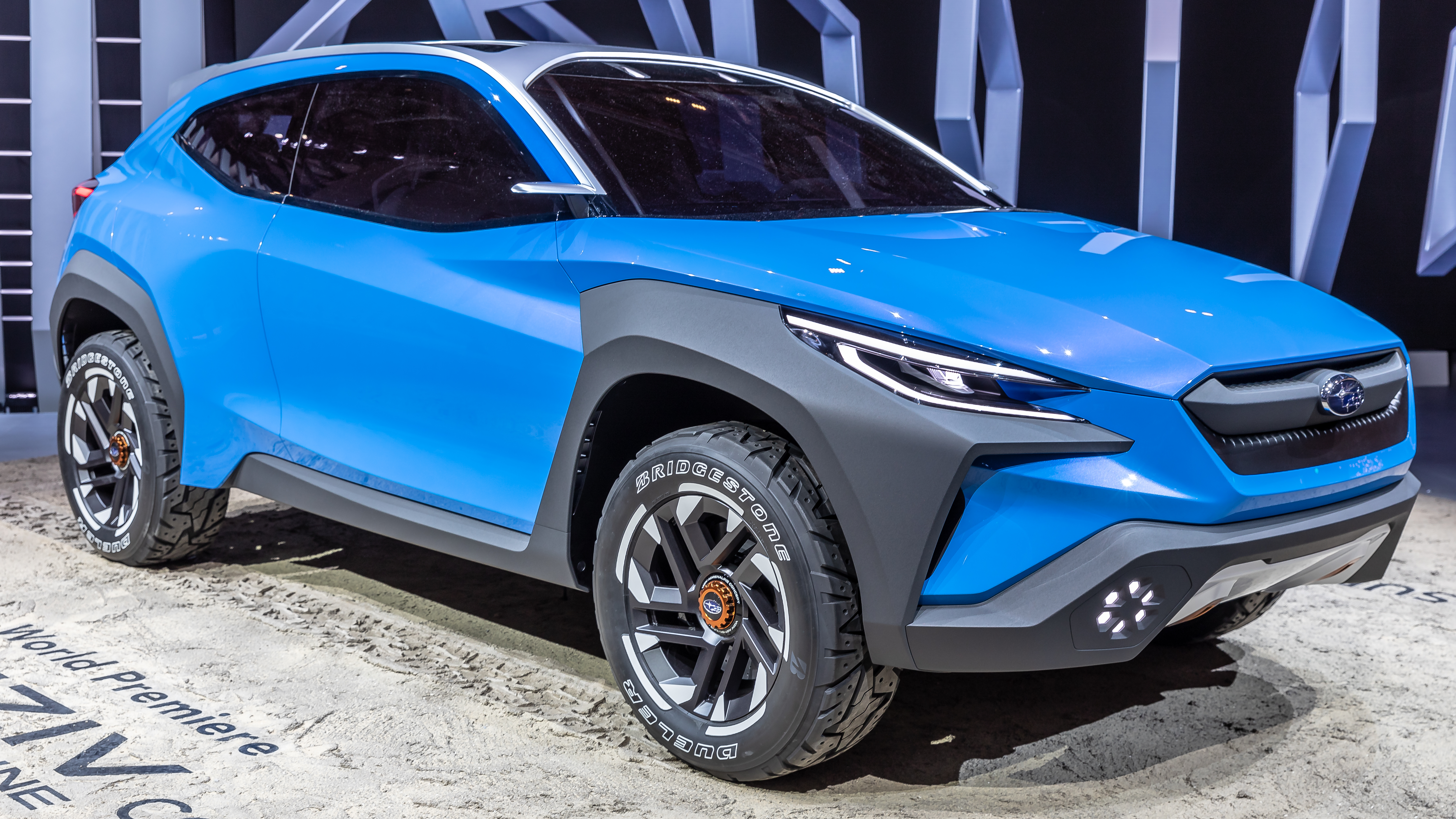
- VIZIV Adrenaline Concept at Geneva (2019)

Overview
- Model years: 2019

Body and chassis
- Body style: 5-door hatch
- Layout: Front engine, all-wheel drive
- Related: Subaru Crosstrek III

Chronology
- Predecessor: VIZIV Tourer

The VIZIV Adrenaline Concept was unveiled one year later at the 89th Geneva International Motor Show on March 5, 2019. Subaru touted the concept vehicle as an evolution of the original "Dynamic × Solid" design philosophy introduced with the first VIZIV; the new design concept was termed "BOLDER" and represents the first vehicle to represent Subaru's new "bolder expression". The Adrenaline Concept crossover featured rugged styling and a unique roof design. No details on the mechanical configuration were available. Press coverage speculated the Adrenaline Concept could preview a future plug-in hybrid production car under either the XV/Crosstrek or Evoltis name.

== Technical ==
The 2013 VIZIV featured what Subaru called an "independent-rear-motor-driven symmetrical AWD" system, where a 2.0-litre diesel horizontally opposed ("Boxer") engine drove the front wheels through the continuously variable transmission (CVT, which Subaru branded "Lineartronic") and provided power generation, and each rear wheel was powered by an independent electric motor. The front wheels could also be powered by a single electric motor. At low speeds and in city traffic, the vehicle is moved solely by the three motors under electric power, taking advantage of low-speed electric motor torque to provide good acceleration with low fuel consumption. At highway speeds, the diesel engine and CVT are used. The use of two rear electric motors allows the car to allocate torque from front to rear and laterally (to the outside wheel) when the steering wheel is turned, enhancing the car's handling.

The 2013 VIZIV is equipped with a driving assist system, which Subaru branded "EyeSight". EyeSight uses twin CCD cameras focused on a single point in front of the car to detect road conditions and objects in front of the car, enabling pedestrian detection, automatic brake engagement, and adaptive cruise control.

== In popular media ==
A sports version of the 2014 VIZIV 2 concept, called the VIZIV GT Vision Gran Turismo, was designed for the videogame Gran Turismo 6. The car features a large diffuser and roof-integrated spoiler, and was made available within the game in November 2014. According to the game's statistics, the VIZIV GT Vision Gran Turismo has a curb weight of 1,380 kg (3,042 lb) with a maximum output of 591 hp (441 kW) and 593 ft⋅lb (804 N⋅m).

== Gallery ==
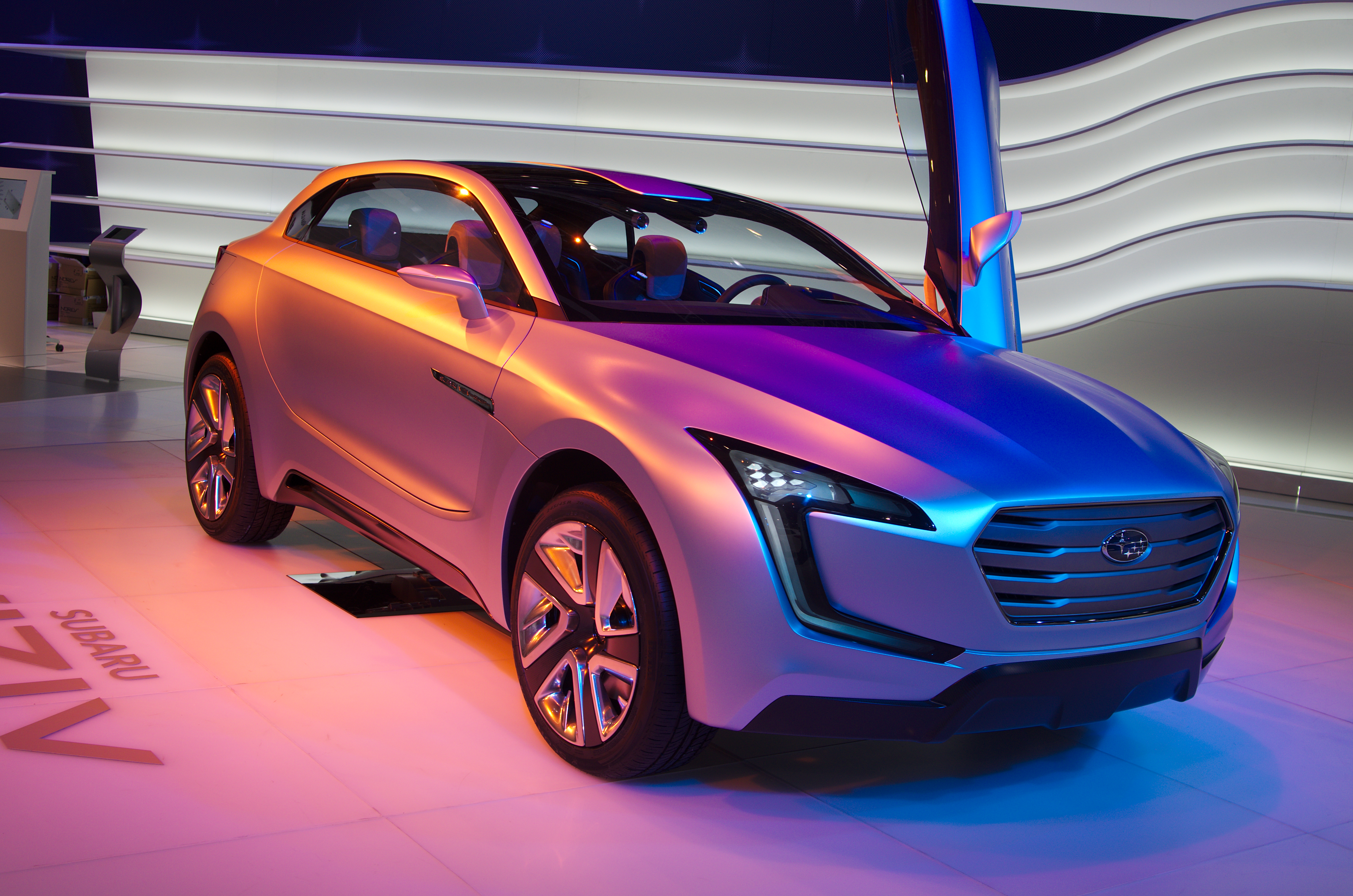
VIZIV at IAA 2013

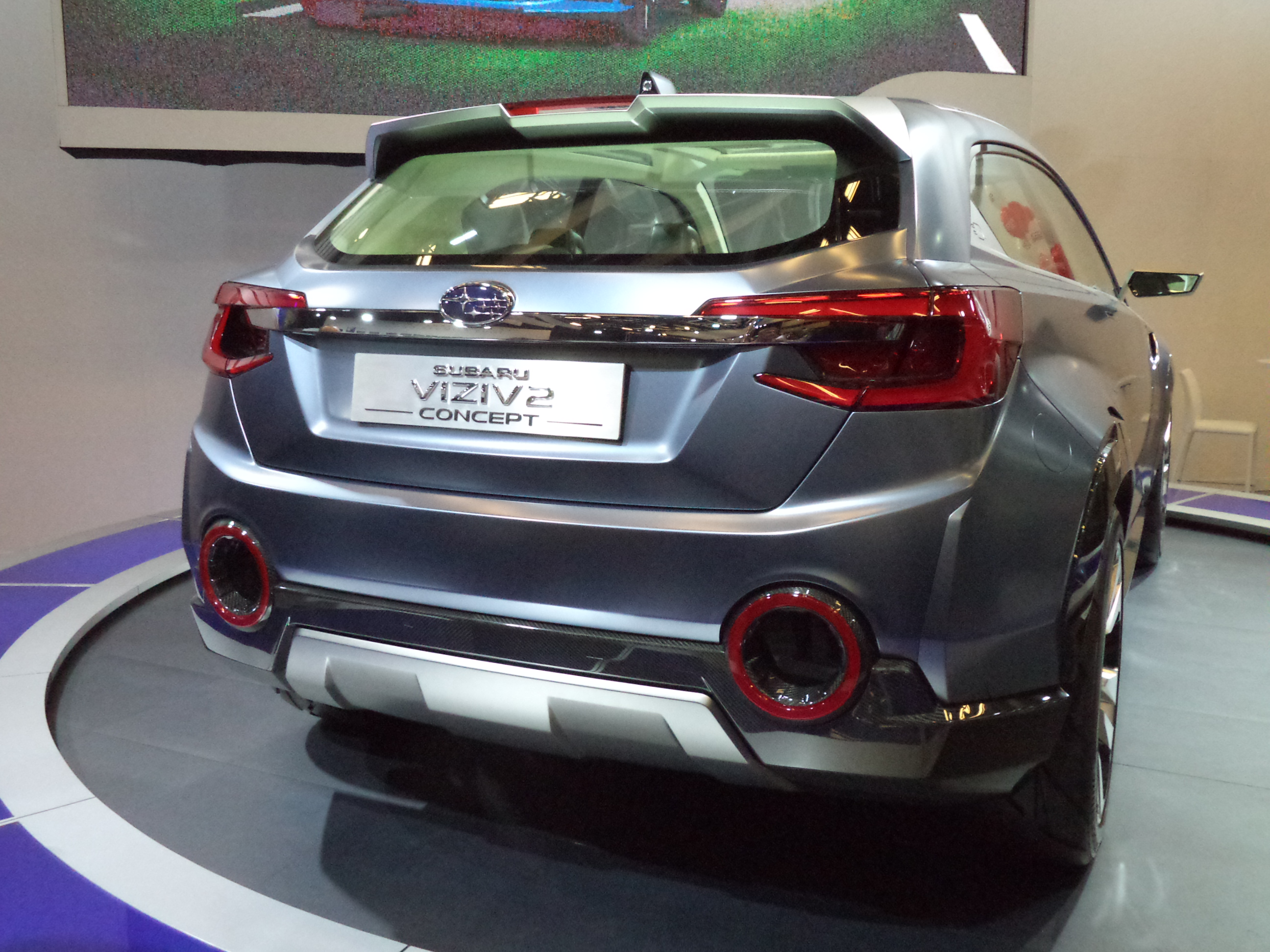
VIZIV 2, rear view (2014)

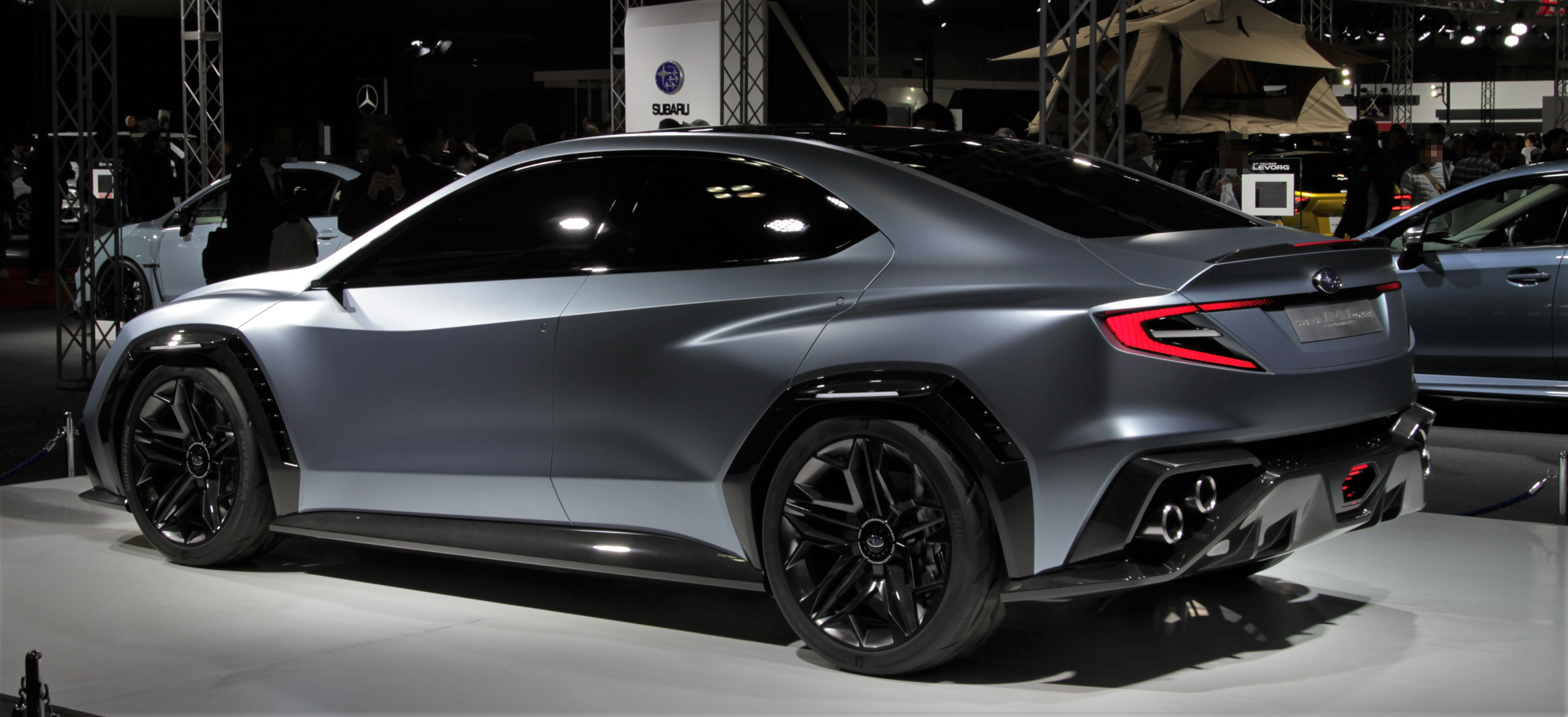
VIZIV Performance at the 2017 Nagoya Motor Show

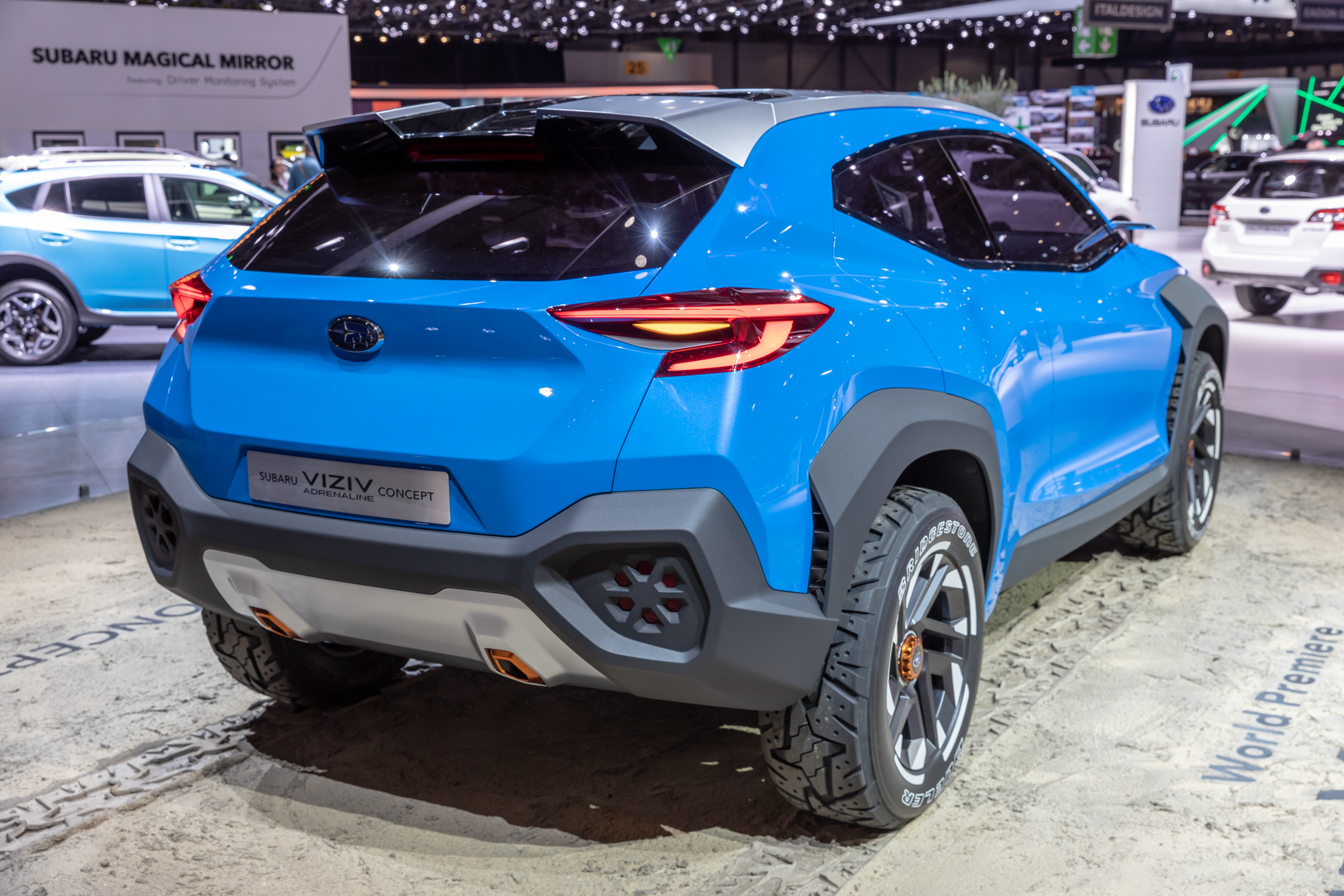
VIZIV Adrenaline at Geneva International Motor Show (2019)
