= Subaru Hybrid Tourer =

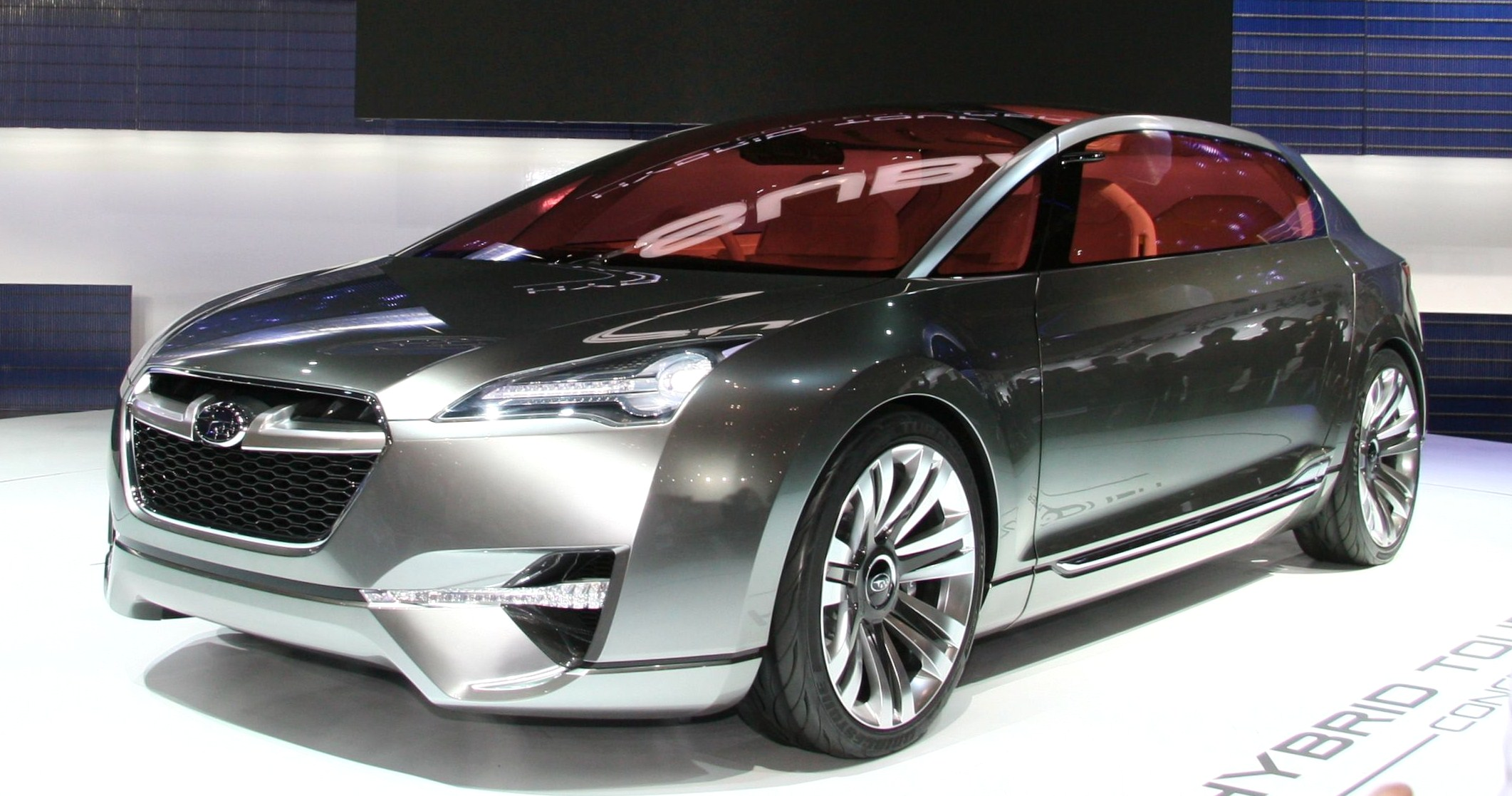
- Hybrid Tourer at TMS 2009

Overview
- Manufacturer: Subaru
- Model years: 2009

Body and chassis
- Class: Concept
- Body style: 3-door Shooting-brake SUV
- Layout: TTR Hybrid - Front engine, front-wheel drive + electrically driven rear wheels
- Doors: Gull-wing

Powertrain
- Engine: 2.0-liter EJ20 H4 Di turbo
- Electric motor: 2x Permanent-magnet AC synchronous electric motors (front and rear)
- Transmission: Lineartronic CVT
- Hybrid drivetrain: Parallel
- Battery: lithium ion

Dimensions
- Length: 4,630 mm (182.3 in)
- Width: 1,890 mm (74.4 in)
- Height: 1,420 mm (55.9 in)

Chronology
- Successor: Advanced Tourer, VIZIV

The Subaru Hybrid Tourer is a hybrid concept sport utility/grand touring vehicle designed and built by Subaru, unveiled at the 2009 Tokyo Motor Show. The Hybrid Tourer included several signature Subaru design features, such as the use of a horizontally-opposed engine and all-wheel drive, and built on prior Subaru hybrid concepts such as the B9SC and B5-TPH by using a two-motor layout. The Hybrid Tourer was succeeded by the 2011 Advanced Tourer concept and the 2013-15 VIZIV diesel hybrid concept series.

== Design ==
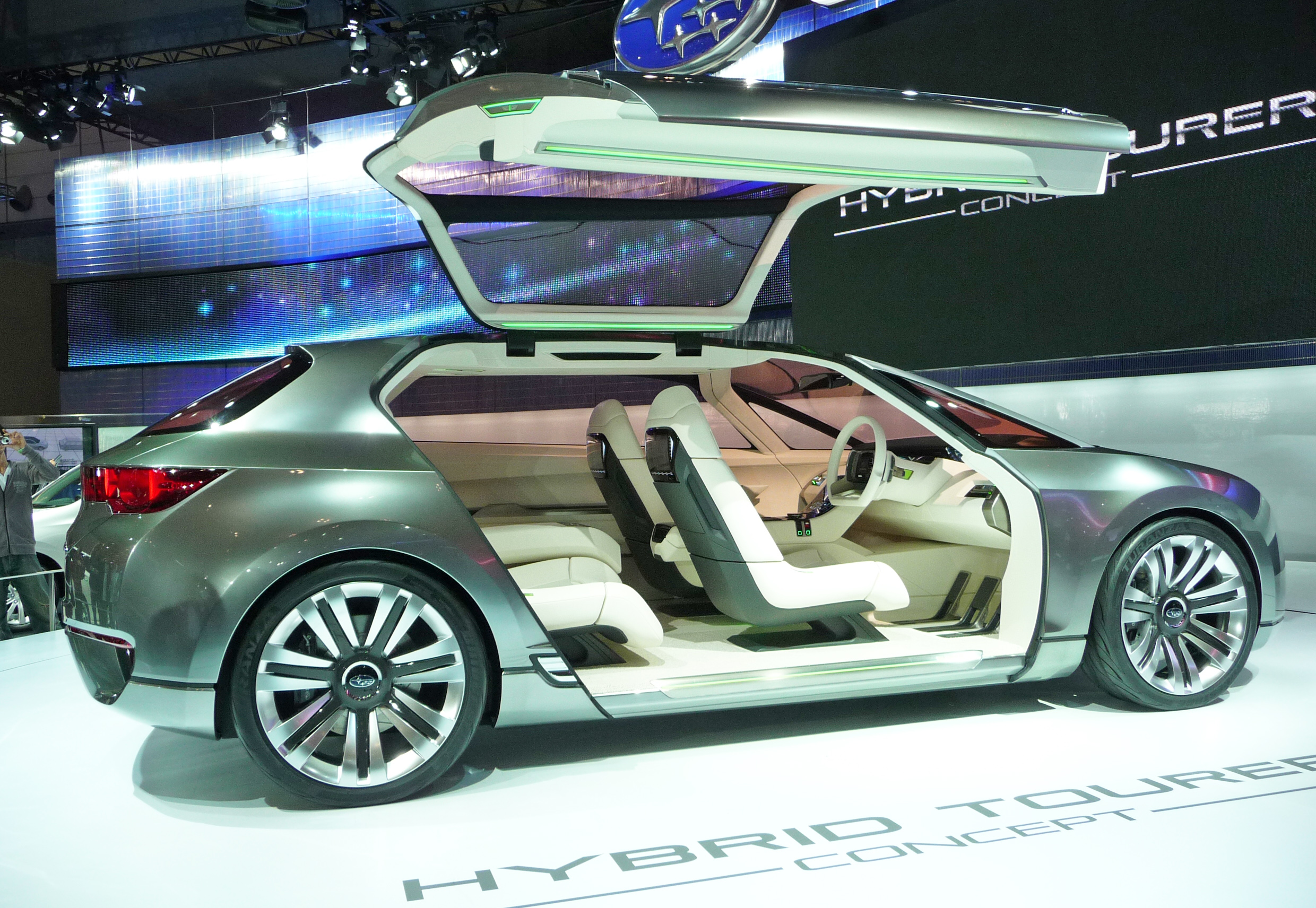
Rear view with the door open

The Hybrid Tourer concept was designed to provide comfortable accommodations for four people, combining a large greenhouse with a luxurious interior. The exterior features two large gull-wing doors intended to evoke "a feeling of freedom and confidence for driving far and wide in any environment." The hexagonal front grille was intended to become part of Subaru's corporate design language, and would resurface on the succeeding Advanced Tourer and VIZIV concepts.

The use of an electric motor for the rear wheels eliminates the need for a mechanical driveshaft from the front-mounted engine for all-wheel drive, allowing the interior floor for rear passengers to be flat. Subaru would announce plans in December 2009 to introduce a hybrid vehicle by 2012, presumably using similar technology as developed for the Hybrid Tourer.

=== Advanced Tourer (2011) ===
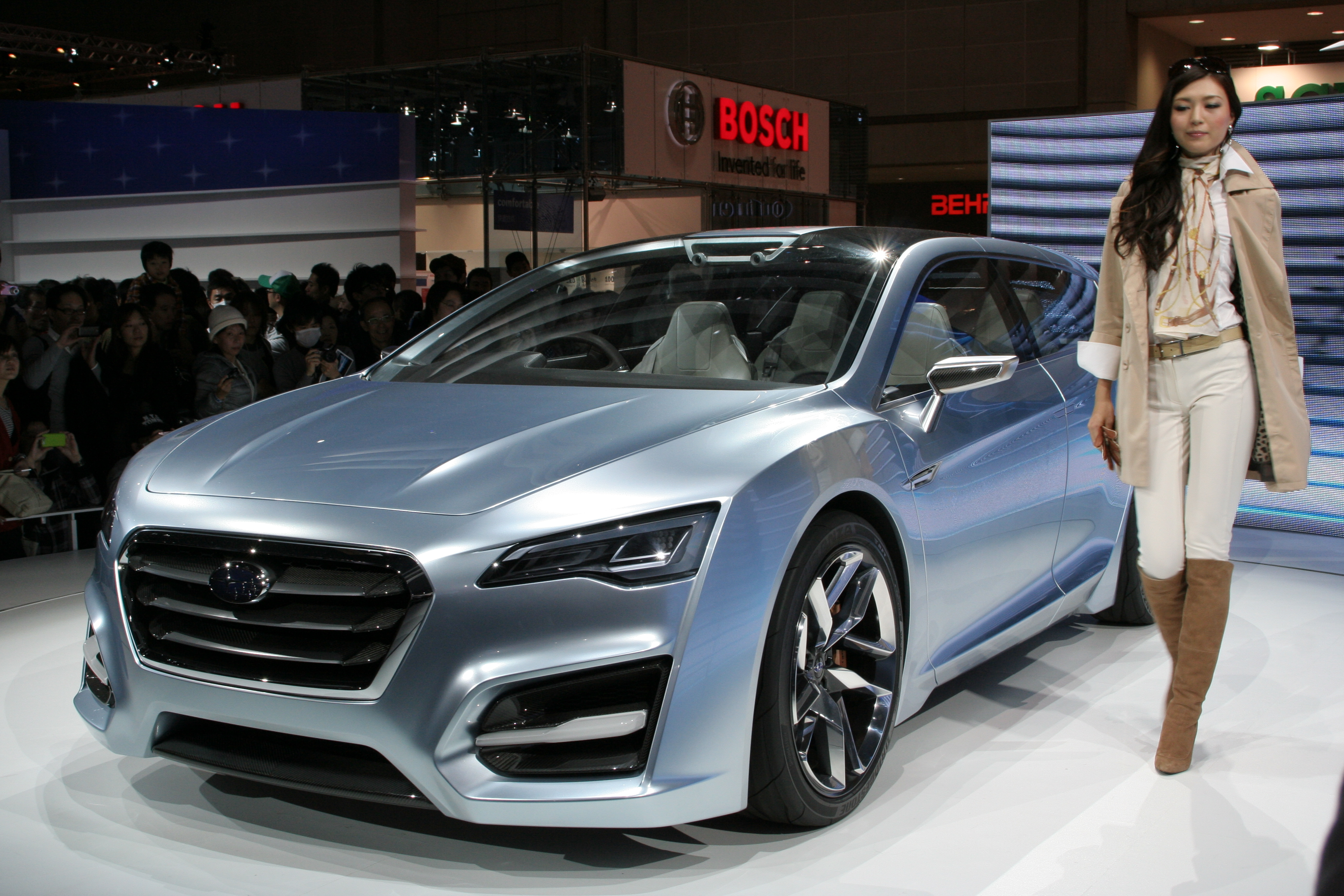
Advanced Tourer at TMS 2011

The Advanced Tourer had its world premiere at the Tokyo Motor Show in late 2011, under the signature phrase "Confidence in Motion". Compared to the Hybrid Tourer, the Advanced Tourer featured four gull-wing doors and a smaller (1.6-litre) direct-injection turbocharged gasoline engine, but used a single electric motor rather than two. Again, Subaru announced plans to release a hybrid vehicle in the United States using a similar powertrain.

=== VIZIV series (2013–15) ===
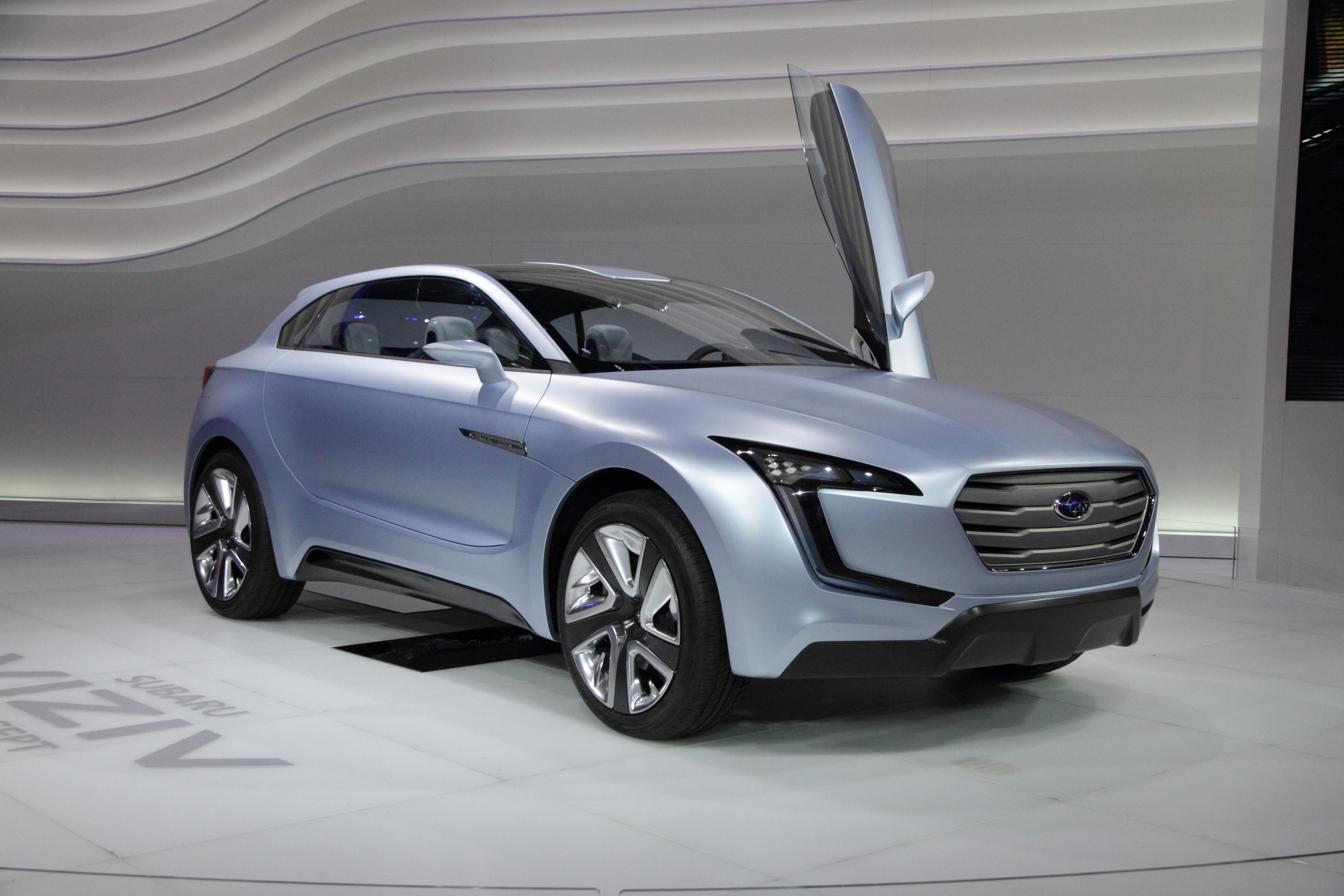
VIZIV at IAA 2013

The VIZIV series of concept cars debuted in 2013 at the Geneva Motor Show, incorporating many design features from the Hybrid and Advanced Tourer concepts, including a hybrid all-wheel-drive powertrain with the rear wheels driven solely by electric motor. The VIZIV's primary difference, aside from styling, was in the use of a diesel prime mover, rather than a gasoline engine in the prior Tourer series.

== Technical ==
The Hybrid Tourer concept featured a 2.0-litre horizontally opposed ("Boxer") direct-injection turbocharged gasoline engine driving the front wheels through the continuously variable transmission (CVT, which Subaru branded "Lineartronic"). The gasoline engine could also provide electric generation by turning a 10 kW (13 hp) electric motor, and the rear axle was powered by a second 20 kW (27 hp) electric motor. The Hybrid Tourer was an evolution of Subaru's prior B5-TPH concept, which used a "Turbo Parallel Hybrid" (TPH) drivetrain where a single electric motor was integrated between the gasoline engine and the transmission.

When the Hybrid Tourer is completely stopped, the gasoline engine is shut off to conserve fuel. At extremely low speeds and when starting from a stop, the vehicle is moved solely by the rear motors under electric power. During normal driving, the gasoline engine is used to drive the front wheels. Under acceleration, the rear motor can be used to assist the gasoline engine, and when accelerating uphill, the front motor can also be used to assist the vehicle.

The Hybrid Tourer is equipped with a driving assist system, which Subaru branded "EyeSight". EyeSight uses a stereo camera to detect road conditions and objects in front of the car, enabling pedestrian detection, automatic brake engagement, and adaptive cruise control.
