= Subaru B5 TPH =

Subaru B5-TPH
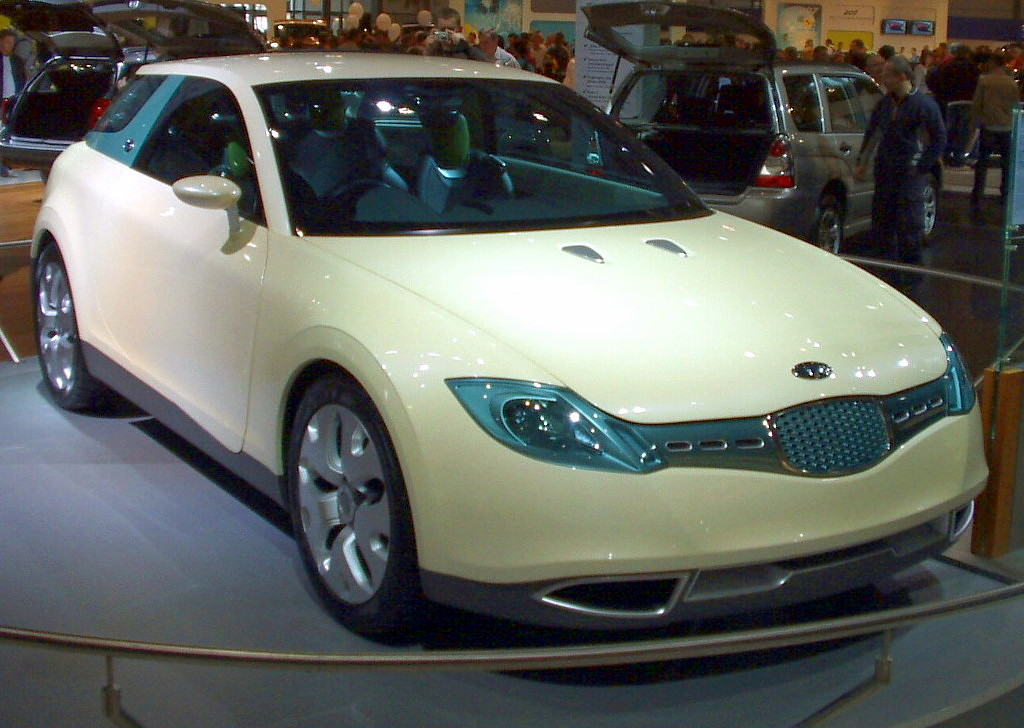
- B5-TPH displayed at AMI Leipzig 2006

Overview
- Production: 2005 (concept)

Body and chassis
- Class: Concept car
- Body style: 3-door shooting-brake
- Layout: F4

Powertrain
- Engine: 2.0 L EJ turbo-derived
- Electric motor: 10 kW (13 hp) motor-generator
- Hybrid drivetrain: Turbo Parallel Hybrid (TPH)

Dimensions
- Wheelbase: 2,672 mm (105.2 in)
- Length: 4,465 mm (175.8 in)
- Width: 1,820 mm (71.7 in)
- Height: 1,500 mm (59.1 in)
- Curb weight: 1,385 kg (3,053 lb)

The Subaru B5-TPH was a concept shooting-brake coupe with a Turbo Parallel Hybrid (TPH) powertrain made by Subaru, introduced at the 2005 Tokyo Motor Show.

== Design ==
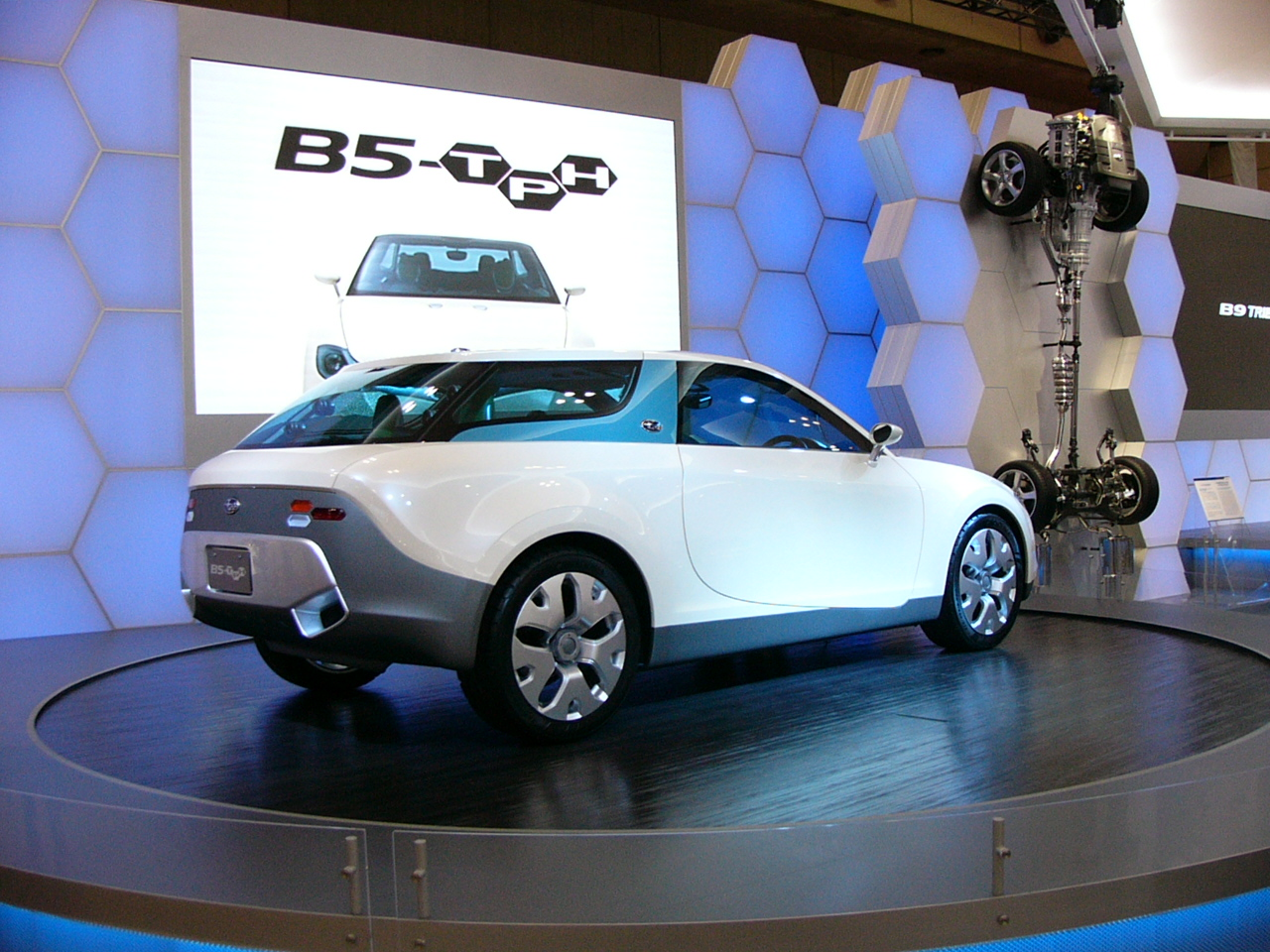
Rear view

The concept behind the B5-TPH was to design a car "for long-weekend [getaways] for couples." Contemporary news articles were generally supportive of the new design direction, which anonymous sources claimed would be used in a forthcoming Impreza. Subaru stated the next Impreza would not be based on the B5-TPH's styling, and that they would launch a hybrid vehicle based on the B5-TPH powertrain in Japan by 2007.

== Technical ==
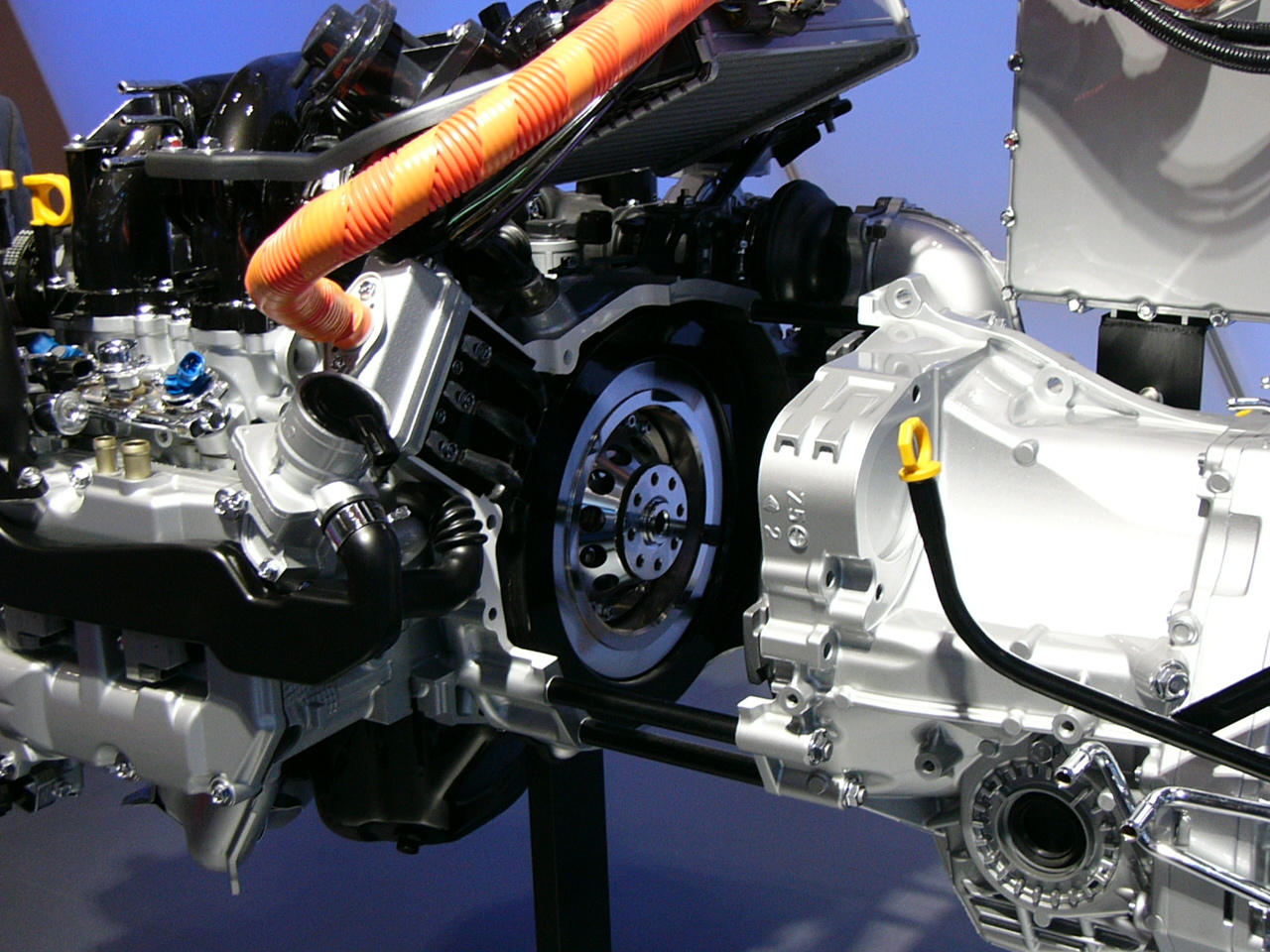
10 kW (13 hp) motor-generator in the B5-TPH power unit (TMS 2005)

The TPH drivetrain featured an electric motor-generator sandwiched between the gasoline motor, which used the Miller cycle, and the automatic transmission. The electric motor was intended to reduce turbo lag and boost fuel economy, with an estimated consumption of 40 mpg_{‑US} (5.9 L/100 km; 48 mpg_{‑imp}) on the EPA combined city/highway cycle. The B5-TPH used manganese lithium-ion batteries.

The gasoline engine had an output of 191 kW (256 hp) at 6,000 RPM and 343 N⋅m (253 ft⋅lb) of torque at 2,400 RPM. The electric motor had outputs of 10 kW (13 hp) and 150 N⋅m (111 ft⋅lb) of torque.

The TPH system was developed with the intent of mass production. Subaru's prior concept hybrid, the B9 Scrambler, featured a Sequential Series Hybrid Electric Vehicle (SSHEV) powertrain. In the SSHEV design, the electric motor was used as the sole source of propulsion up to 80 km/h (50 mi/h), switching over to the gasoline engine above those speeds. The newer TPH system was more cost-effective because it used a more compact electric motor and battery.

The batteries were developed by NEC Lamilion Energy, Ltd., which had been co-founded in 2002 by NEC and FHI to develop a lithium-ion capacitor which promised better energy density and durability compared to normal storage batteries. NEC Lamilion was later absorbed into Automotive Energy Supply Corporation, who would go on to supply the lithium-ion battery pack for the Nissan Leaf electric vehicle.
