= Subaru B9 Scrambler =

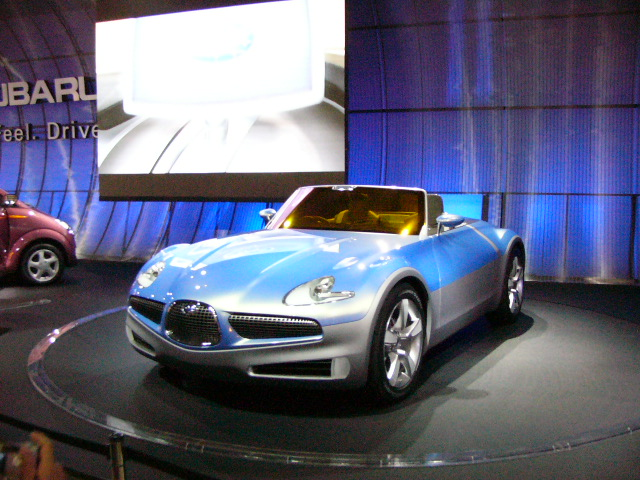
- B9SC displayed at the 2003 Tokyo Motor Show

Overview
- Manufacturer: Subaru
- Also called: Subaru B9SC
- Production: 2003
- Designer: Andreas Zapatinas

Body and chassis
- Class: Concept car
- Body style: 2-door roadster
- Layout: F4

Powertrain
- Engine: 2.0 L flat-4 gasoline-electric hybrid
- Electric motor: 134 hp (100 kW) electric motor
- Hybrid drivetrain: Sequential Series Hybrid Electric Vehicle (SSHEV)

Dimensions
- Length: 4,200 mm (165.4 in)
- Width: 1,880 mm (74.0 in)

The Subaru B9 Scrambler (also known as the Subaru B9SC) is an open two-seat concept sports car manufactured by Subaru. It features a hybrid powertrain and aircraft inspired styling.

== Design ==
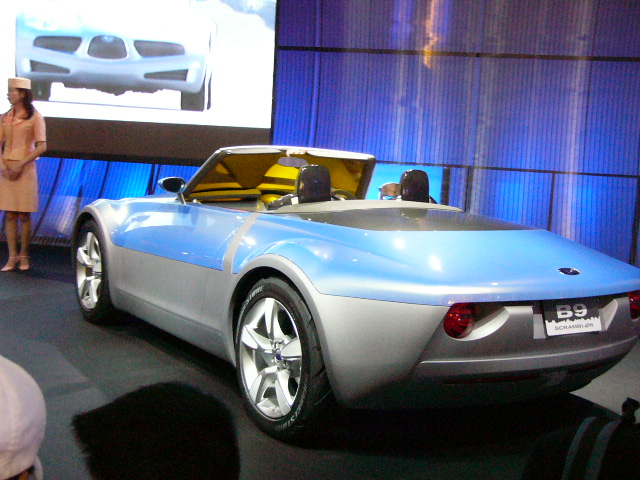
Rear view

This concept car was first shown in 2003 at the Tokyo Motor Show. It was designed with influence from Subaru's aircraft heritage, with the front end appearing to look like the cross section of an airliner, with a central jet intake and wings. This theme was originally developed for the Subaru B11S which had been exhibited in Spring 2003. The lower panels of the B9 are dent resistant.

Car and Driver speculated the Pontiac Solstice roadster could have been based on the same platform as the B9 Scrambler, as General Motors held a minority stake in Subaru's parent company, Fuji Heavy Industries, from 1999 to 2005.

== Specifications ==
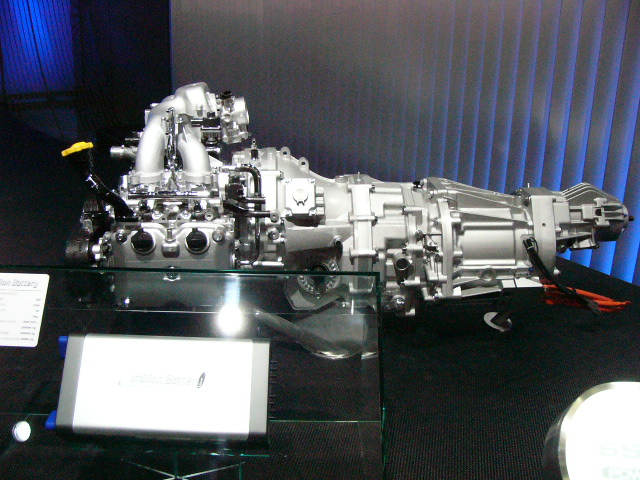
SSHEV powertrain (TMS 2003)

The automobile features a 2.0 litre flat-4 cylinder hybrid powertrain, which Subaru calls the Sequential Series Hybrid Electric Vehicle (SSHEV). In the SSHEV, the 134 hp (100 kW) electric motor alone is used to move the car up to 80 km/h (50 mph), at which point the 138 hp (103 kW) gasoline engine takes over. Under 80 km/h (50 mph), the gasoline engine may be used to charge the battery or under heavy acceleration. It is Subaru's first hybrid powertrain, and Subaru president Kyoji Takenaka stated that existing conventionally-powered Subaru models required "no modification" to install the SSHEV.

The ride height can be adjusted through a self-leveling air suspension. Front and rear-facing cameras, coupled with a radar system are used in an intelligent cruise control and lane departure warning system.

== In popular media ==
The B9SC appeared as a playable vehicle in the 2005 video game WRC: Rally Evolved.
