= Subaru Suiren =

Overview
- Type: Concept car
- Manufacturer: Subaru
- Production: 1993 (Concept)

Body and chassis
- Body style: 2-door coupe utility
- Layout: F4
- Platform: Subaru Global Platform
- Related: Subaru Impreza

Powertrain
- Engine: 2.5 L Subaru H4; 118 kW (158 hp)
- Transmission: 4-speed manual 3-speed automatic

Dimensions
- Wheelbase: 2,520 mm (99.2 in)
- Length: 4,630 mm (182.3 in)
- Width: 1,760 mm (69.3 in)
- Height: 1,540 mm (60.6 in)
- Curb weight: 1,700 kg (3,748 lb)

Chronology
- Predecessor: Subaru BRAT
- Successor: Subaru Baja

The Subaru Suiren (Japanese: スバルスイレン) was a concept made by Fuji Heavy Industries - It was proposed as a sport utility wagon / stylish touring pickup truck with a detachable canopy and large 'indestructible' plastic windows, allowing it to be turned into a sport utility wagon. The Suiren appeared to be a direct replacement for the BRAT.

The name Suiren is Japanese for water lily.

== Design ==
The Suiren was developed in Japan in the early 1990s and introduced at the 1993 Tokyo Motor Show. It featured a detachable rear canopy, with lightweight high impact plastic window glass. Based on the Impreza platform, the proposal included the use of full time 4WD for stability and comfort, with the convenience and utility of a pickup.

== Technical ==
It was planned to be powered by a 2.5-litre 16-valve DOHC flat-four engine with a semi-automatic transmission by Prodrive, developed for WRC racing, with control buttons on the steering wheel - Including a Rally-derived full time 4WD and Viscous LSD equipped center differential transmission system and multi-link suspension.

== Links ==
- https://www.subaru-impreza.de/Studien/Suiren/SuirenEng.htm
- https://www.allcarindex.com/auto-car-model/Japan-Subaru-Suiren
- https://carsthatnevermadeitetc.tumblr.com/post/163419835840/subaru-suiren-1993-a-concept-pick-up-with-a
- https://www.xn--gp-fka.de/Studien/Suiren/index.htm
- https://www.drive.com.au/caradvice/the-next-generation-subaru-brumby-that-never-was
- https://images.drive.com.au/driveau/image/upload/c_fill,f_auto,g_auto,h_540,q_auto:good,w_960/cms/uploads/gzxwfvbi8jrkeocy133n
- https://viruscars.com/the-next-generation-subaru-brumby-that-never-was/
- https://youtu.be/Cs6VLqUW17c?t=192
