= Subaru BRAT =

Small utility vehicle

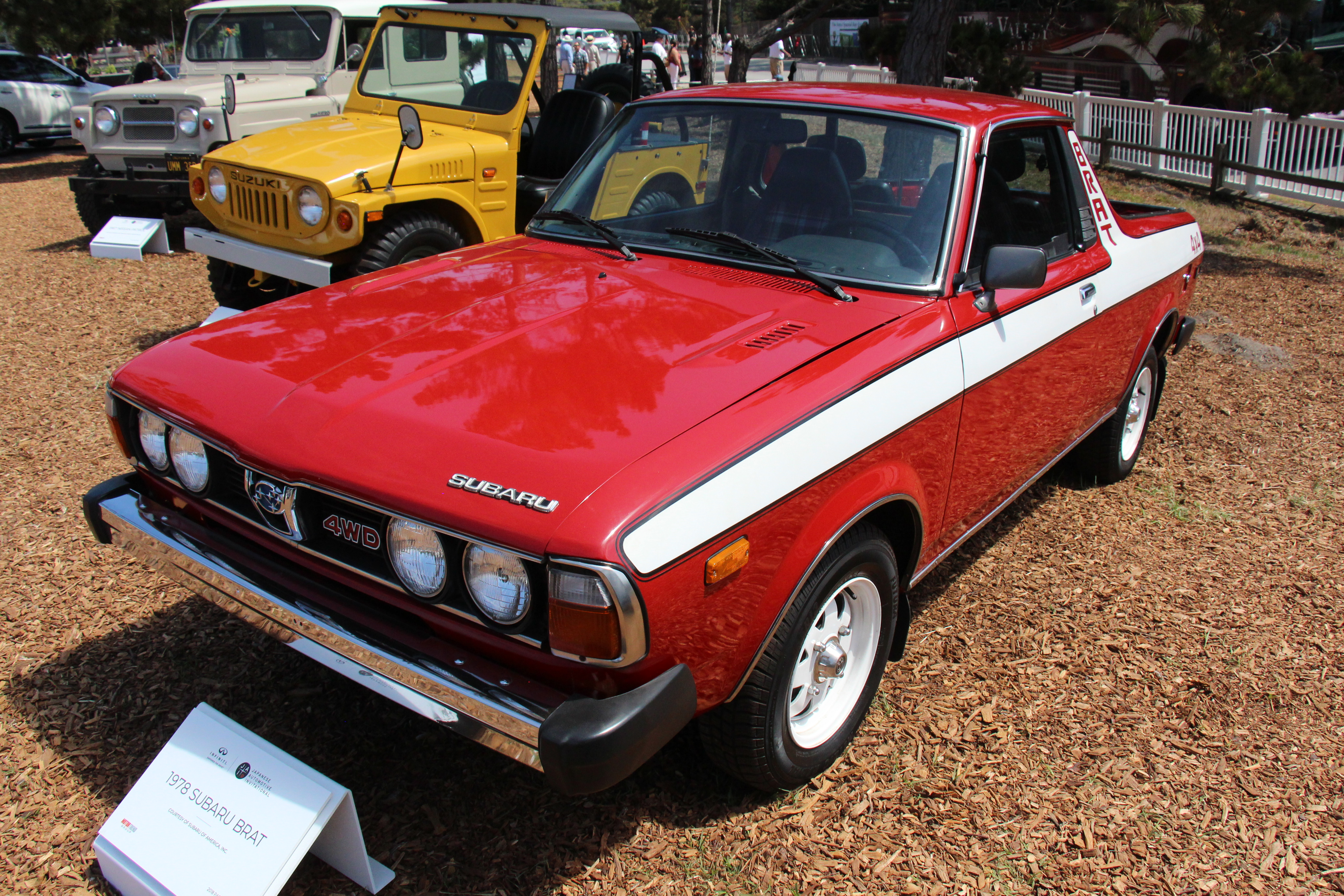
- 1978 Subaru Brumby (BRAT)

Overview
- Manufacturer: Subaru
- Production: 1978–1994

Body and chassis
- Body style: 2-door coupé utility
- Layout: Front-engine, four-wheel drive
- Related: Subaru Leone

The Subaru BRAT is a four-wheel drive coupé utility by Subaru from 1978 to 1994, based on the Leone. Depending on the market it was known as the Brumby, MV Pickup or Shifter.

== Technical ==
The BRAT was four-wheel drive, and powered by the Subaru EA engine. Early models received the 1.6 litre EA-71, whereas 1981 and later models received a 1.8 litre EA-81 engine. The 1983 and 1984 models could be purchased with an optional 94 hp (70 kW) turbocharged engine.

Manual transmissions were standard on all models, and an automatic transmission was available on turbocharged BRAT's. The 1980 and earlier models had a single-range transfer case, while 1981 and later GL models had a dual-range transfer case (DL's still had single range), and all turbocharged models were equipped with a 3 speed automatic transmission with a single-range, push-button, four-wheel drive.

== First generation ==
First Generation
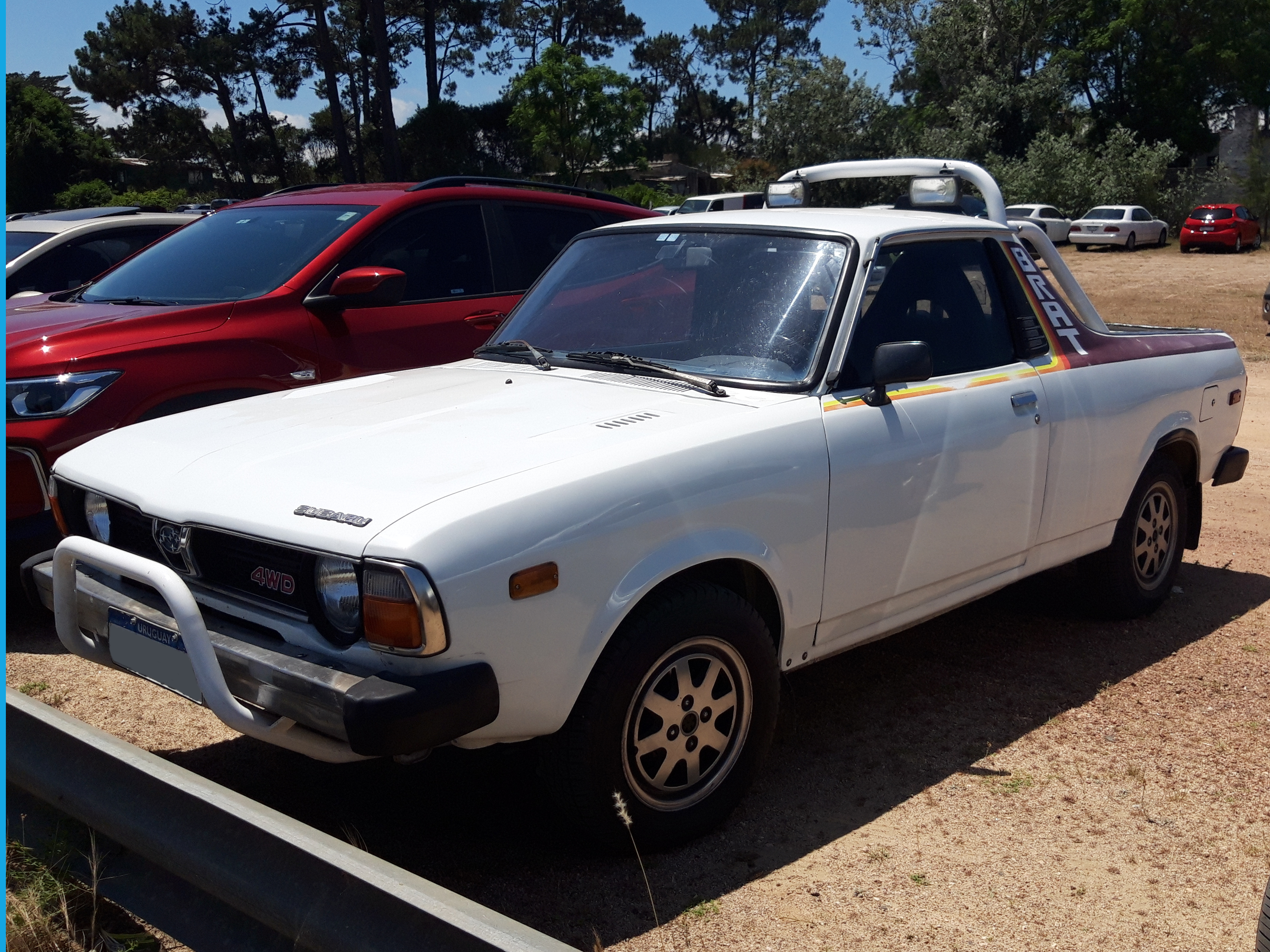
- Subaru BRAT / Brumby / MV Pickup Gen I

Overview
- Also called: Subaru 1400; Subaru 1600
- Production: 1978–1981
- Designer: Alex Tremulis

Body and chassis
- Body style: 2-door coupe utility
- Layout: Front-engine, front-wheel drive Front-engine, all-wheel drive (optional)

Powertrain
- Engine: 1.6 L EA71 OHV H4 (A33/34/67)
- Transmission: 4-speed manual 3-speed automatic

Dimensions
- Wheelbase: 2,455 mm (96.7 in)
- Length: 3,995 mm (157.3 in)
- Width: 1,500 mm (59.1 in)
- Height: 1,385 mm (54.5 in)
- Curb weight: 775 kg (1,709 lb)

Developed in Japan in 1977 at the request of the President of Subaru of America, the BRAT was introduced to match the demand for small trucks in North America, in order to compete against other manufacturers, such as Toyota, Nissan, and Mazda. Unlike trucks from other manufacturers, all BRATs had four-wheel drive, as they were developed from the existing Leone station wagon. When the Leone was redesigned in 1979 for the 1980 model year, the BRAT continued with the original Gen I body until 1982.

=== Jump seats ===
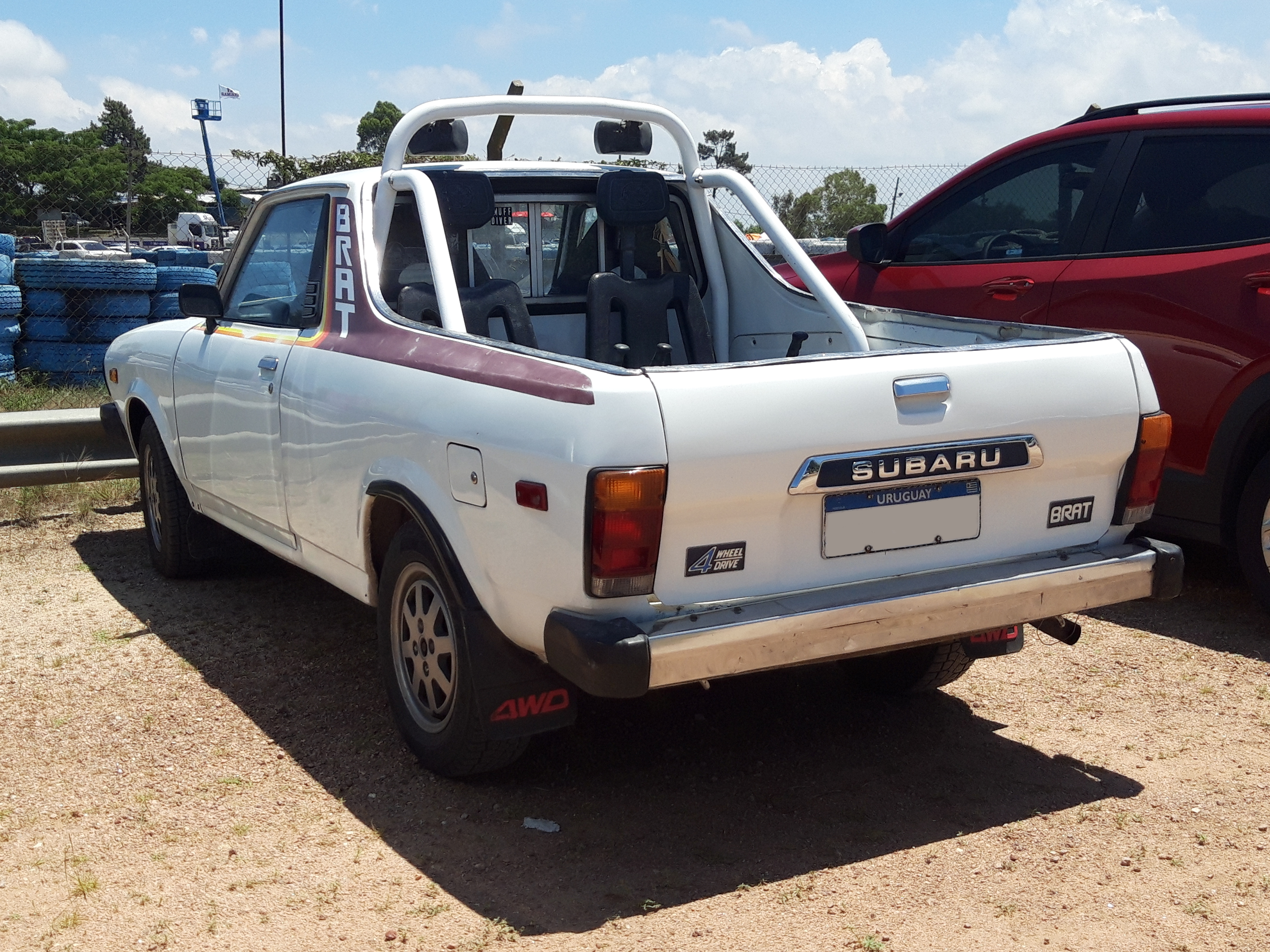
Subaru BRAT rear jump seats

North American and Canadian BRAT models featured carpeting in addition to welded-in rear-facing plastic jump seats in the cargo area. The seats were a ploy to circumvent a punitive tariff on light trucks known as the Chicken Tax. The plastic seats in the cargo bed allowed Subaru to classify the BRAT as a passenger car, rather than as a light truck. This significantly reduced the costs of importing BRATS to North America, as passenger cars were charged a 2.5% import tariff, while light trucks were charged a ten times higher 25% import tariff. They were discontinued after the 1986 model year.

== Second generation ==
Second Generation
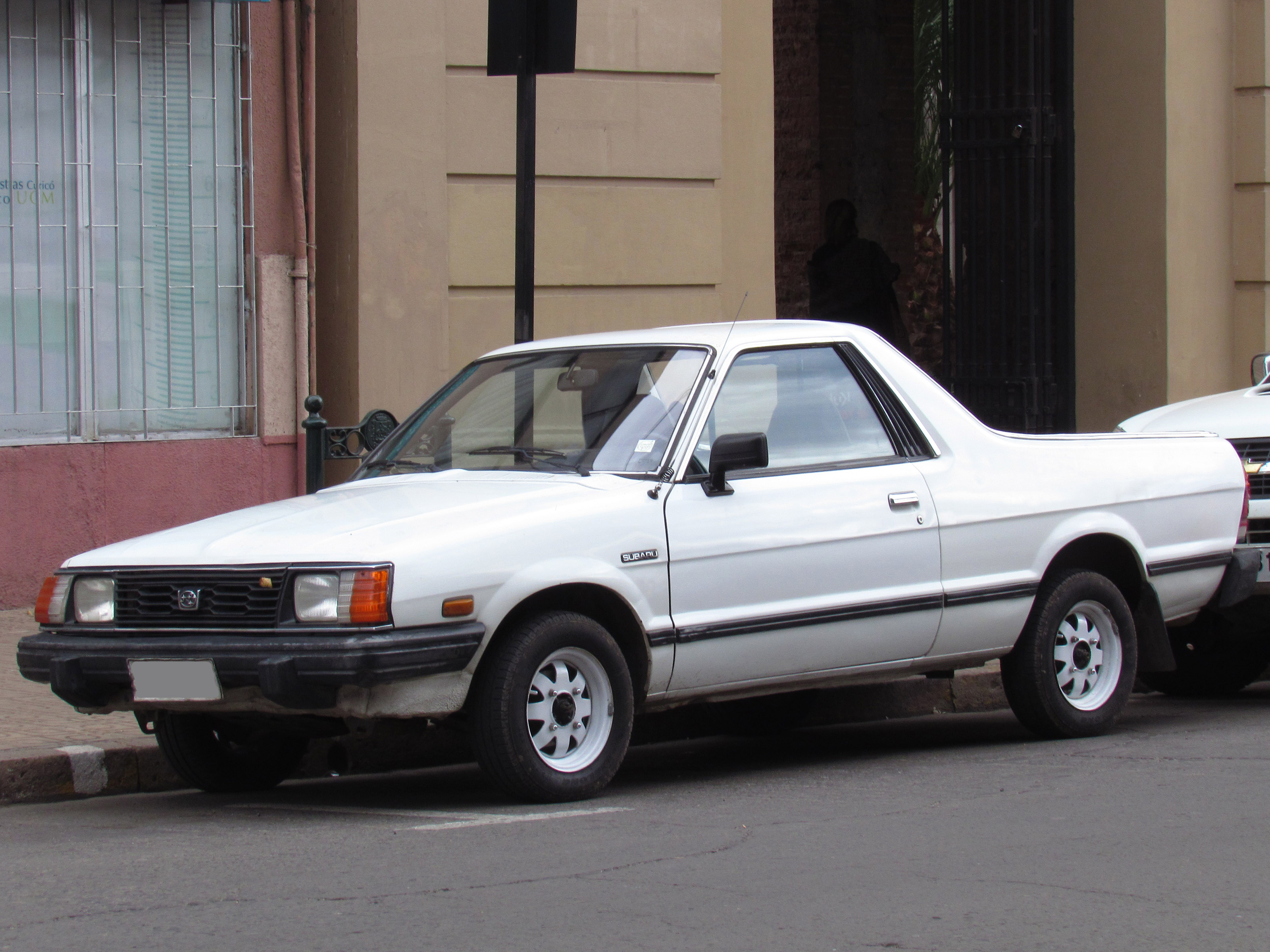
- Subaru BRAT / Brumby / MV Pickup Gen II

Overview
- Manufacturer: Subaru
- Also called: Subaru 284; Subaru Brumby; Subaru Shifter; Subaru MV; Subaru Targa; Subaru Pickup
- Production: 1981–1994
- Model years: 1982–1994
- Assembly: Ōta, Gunma, Japan; Pretoria, South Africa; Waitara, New Zealand (until 1987)

Body and chassis
- Body style: 2-door coupe utility
- Layout: F4
- Related: Subaru Leone

Powertrain
- Engine: 1.8 L EA-81 H4; 1.8 L EA-81 turbo H4
- Transmission: 4-speed manual; 3-speed automatic

Dimensions
- Wheelbase: 2,456 mm (96.7 in)
- Length: 4,424 mm (174.2 in)
- Width: 1,620 mm (63.8 in)
- Height: 1,415 mm (55.7 in)
- Curb weight: 1,000 kg (2,205 lb)

Chronology
- Successor: Subaru Baja

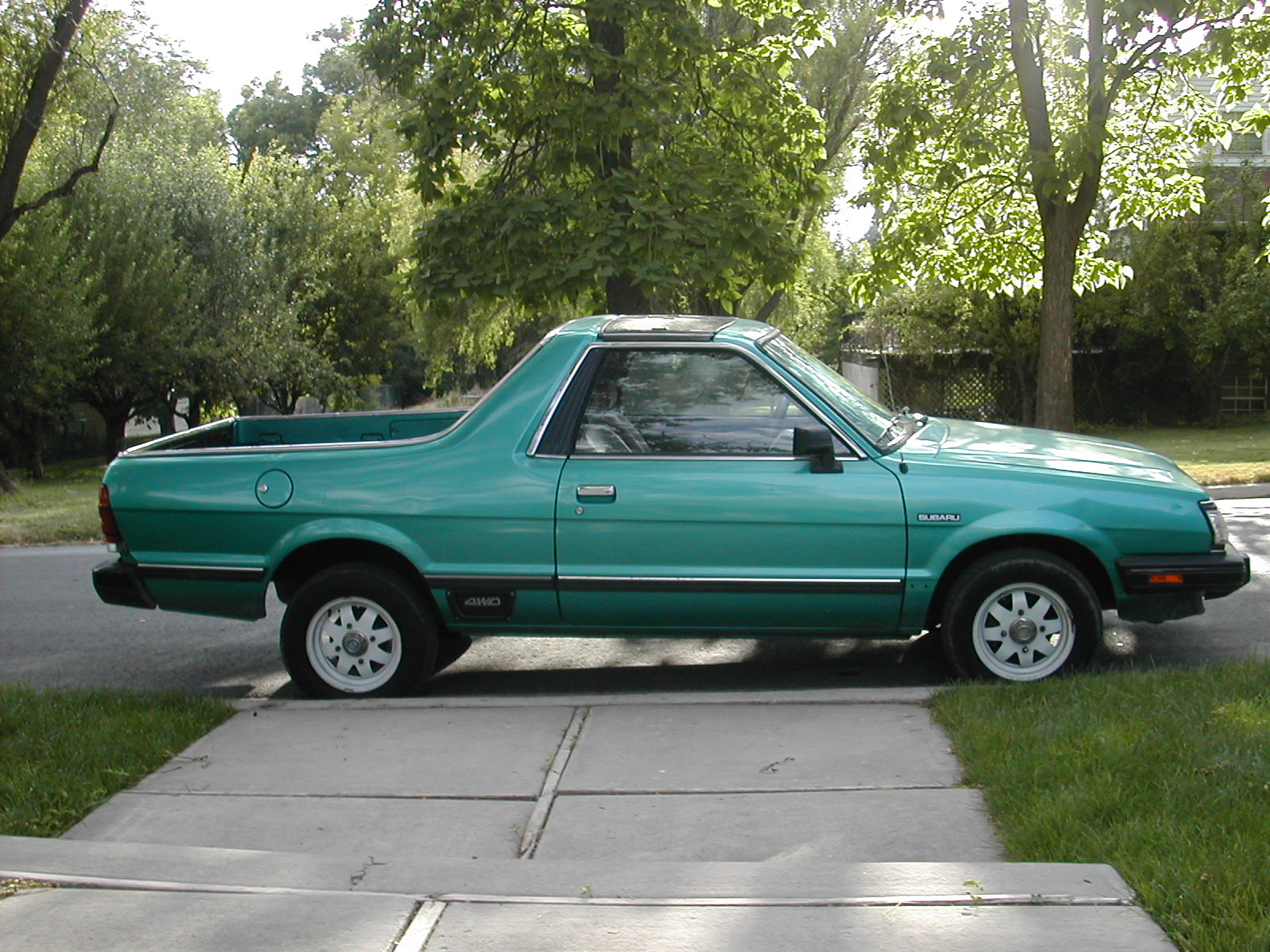
Subaru BRAT Targa Top

The BRAT was restyled in 1981 and the jump seats were discontinued after the 1985 model year. The BRAT was re-introduced with a rise in popularity of small trucks being sold in the United States, primarily from Toyota, Nissan, and Mazda. Production continued into 1994 but ceased to be imported to North America in 1987. It was also known as the Brumby in Australia and New Zealand and the MV Pickup / Shifter in the UK. Imports to Europe, Australia (from 1978), and New Zealand continued until February 1994. The BRAT was not sold in Japan and was manufactured for export markets.

=== Features ===
The early 1980s saw the introduction of a second gen targa top version. It also had other features, such as: a spring-loaded hidden door, for a side step into the cargo bed; and a spare tire mounted under the hood.

In Australia there were specialty features: Ag-quip / packages with graphics, roo bar, sump guard & rear step bar. Wagon wheels were also optional.

== Manufacture ==
It was an export-only model, never being officially sold in Japan. Due to this, the BRAT became a popular grey import vehicle in Japan.

There were several locations that manufactured the vehicle:

- Ōta, Gunma, Japan (until 1994)
- Pretoria, South Africa
- Waitara, New Zealand (until 1987)

Subaru never considered marketing the BRAT in their home market, due to a truncating demand of pickup trucks that had been occurring since the late 1970s. The declining demand came as a result of Japanese customers shifting to station wagons at that time.

In 1987, exports to North America ceased, but exports to Europe, Australia, Latin America, and New Zealand continued until 1994.

== Motorsport ==
There have been several private enterprises that have used the BRAT / Brumby / MV Pickup in Motorsport events:

- 2014: Settlement Creek—Brumby desert racer.
- 2018: Freddie Flintoff chose a 1985 BRAT during an electric vehicle challenge on Top Gear series 27. Unlike the other vehicles, Flintoff kept the petrol engine in situ, as well as installing a Tesla power-plant.
- 2020: 1988 Drag Brumby—fastest EJ powered vehicle.

== Successor ==
There were no third generation BRAT/Brumby/MV pickups as the range was discontinued after 1987 in the United States. In Australia, the range was continued until 1994.

Subaru did, however, reveal a 2-door pickup concept in 1993 called the Suiren, and later on in 2002, the automaker released a similar pickup vehicle called the Baja. The Baja is considered by many to be the successor to the Brat, despite being a 4-door instead of a 2-door.
