= Subaru Legacy (third generation) =

Third generation of Subaru Legacy

Legacy BE-BH-BT series
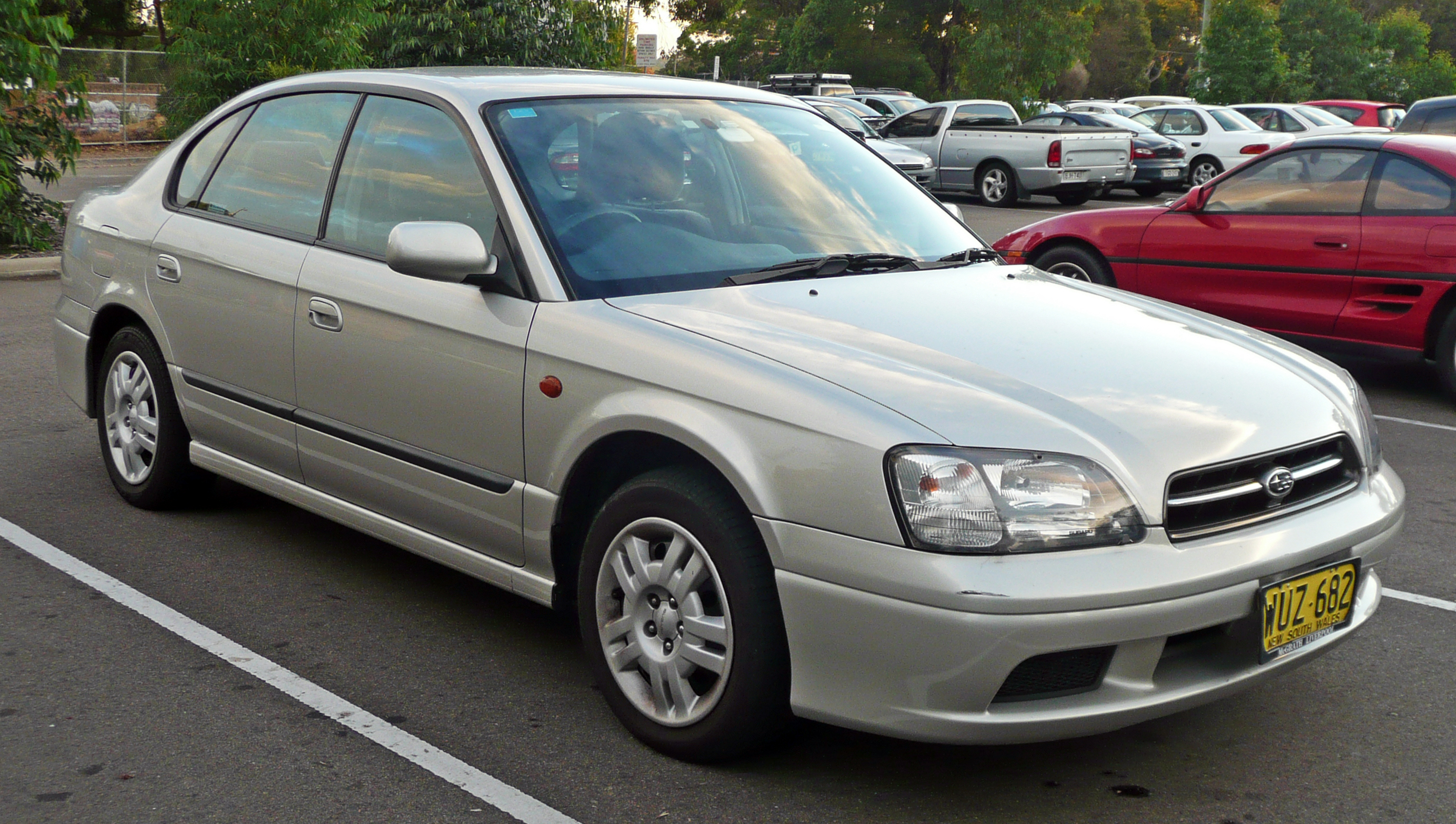
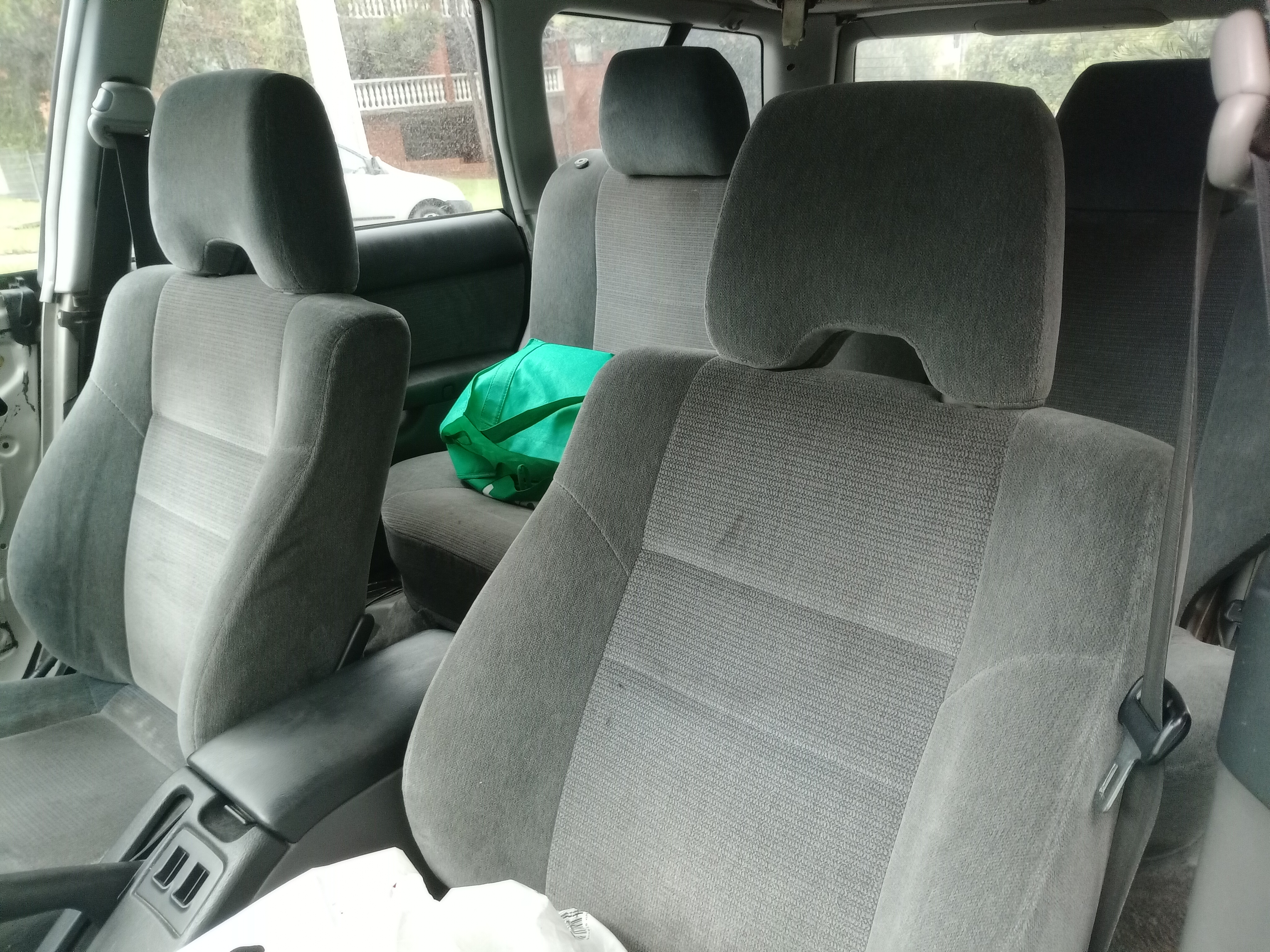
- 2000 Subaru Liberty Sedan Interior (station wagon)

Overview
- Manufacturer: Subaru (Fuji Heavy Industries)
- Model code: BE/BH/BT
- Also called: Subaru Liberty (Australia)
- Production: 1998–2004
- Model years: 2000–2004
- Assembly: Ōta, Gunma, Japan; Lafayette, Indiana, USA (SIA)

Body and chassis
- Class: Mid-size
- Body style: "B" pillar Hardtop and Wagon
- Layout: Front engine, four-wheel drive
- Related: Subaru Baja

Powertrain
- Engine: 2.0 L SOHC EJ20E, 125 hp (93 kW) H4 2.0 L EJ201, SOHC 135 hp (101 kW) H4; 2.0 L EJ204, DOHC 155 hp (116 kW) H4; 2.0 L EJ206, DOHC 265 hp (198 kW) twin turbo H4 automatic 2.0 L EJ208 DOHC 276 hp (206 kW) twin turbo H4 manual 2.0 L EJ208 DOHC 289 hp (216 kW) twin turbo H4 manual 2.5 L EJ251, SOHC 153 hp (114 kW) H4; 2.5 L EJ251, EJ252, SOHC 165 hp (123 kW) H4; 2.5 L EJ254, DOHC 165 hp (123 kW) H4; 2.5 L EJ254, DOHC 170 hp (130 kW) H4 3.0 L EZ30, DOHC Flat-6 (162kW at 6000 rpm and 289 N⋅m (213 ft⋅lbf) at 4400 rpm)
- Transmission: 4-speed automatic 5-speed manual 6-speed manual

Dimensions
- Wheelbase: 2,650 mm (104.3 in)
- Length: 4,760 mm (187.4 in) (wagon); 4,680 mm (184.4 in) (sedan)
- Width: 1,740 mm (68.7 in) (Int'l); 1,694 mm (66.7 in) (Japan)
- Height: 1,410 mm (55.7 in) (sedan); 1,510 mm (59.6 in) (wagon); 1,440 mm (56.5 in) (Brighton wagon)
- Curb weight: 1,500 kg (3,300 lb) max

Chronology
- Predecessor: Subaru Legacy (second generation)
- Successor: Subaru Legacy (fourth generation)

Subaru launched the third generation Japanese and world-market Legacy in June 1998, while the North American model was introduced in May 1999 for the 2000 model year. In all markets except for the United States, production lasted through 2002, with a limited production Blitzen model sold mid-cycle under the 2003 model year in Japan. Production in the United States lasted through 2004.

At its introduction in 1999, it won the Automotive Researchers' and Journalists' Conference Car of the Year award in Japan.

All models were equipped with standard, symmetrical all wheel drive. World-market and Japanese models ranged from a naturally aspirated or twin-turbo 2.0-liter flat-4 to naturally aspirated 3.0-liter. Even though dimensions became mid-sized, it was still rated by the EPA as a compact car.

Flat roof wagons are no longer manufactured worldwide, and instead the raised roof is used for both the Legacy and Outback wagons (Lancaster in Japan).

In late 2000, the EZ30, a newly designed 3.0 L H6 was offered in the Outback and Lancaster (Japan) models.

The Legacy was the only vehicle in this class that provided AWD as standard equipment.

== Architecture ==
=== B4 ===
The B4 model was introduced for the third generation and was a sedan-only model. The RSK meaning "Rally Sport Kompressor" featured the familiar DOHC, twin-turbo 2.0-liter engine rated 276 bhp (206 kW) (265 bhp (198 kW) for automatic with manual mode). This results in a 0–60 mph (97 km/h) time of 5.2 seconds for the manual and 5.8 seconds for the automatic. This engine was popular with Japanese buyers due to reduced tax liability based on Japanese vehicle size legislation; the car offered performance advantages over larger cars sold in Japan with bigger engines but with a smaller tax bill. The B4 moniker also applied to naturally aspirated models, such as the 2.0 L TS-R.

Australia models (called B4) were detuned to run on lower octane (98 RON) fuel and were rated 258 PS (190 kW; 254 hp) for the manual and 239 PS (176 kW; 236 hp) for the automatic models. This results in a 0–60 mph time of 5.6 seconds for the manual and 6.6 seconds for the automatic.

A B4 TS-R model was equipped with a less powerful, naturally aspirated 2.0 L DOHC AVCS engine, but shared many of the body and suspension components of the more powerful RSK.

In 2001, a B4 RS25 model was introduced with a naturally aspirated 2.5 L DOHC engine.

In 2002, the B4 RS30 was introduced with a naturally aspirated 3.0 L EZ30 DOHC flat-six engine.

B4 Engine Structure

The B4 is powered by a 'phase 2' all-alloy DOHC, 16-valve, intercooled turbo 2.0-liter boxer four. According to official Subaru literature, there are several advantages to the boxer design. Due to the balance afforded by horizontally opposed cylinders, the crankshaft requires less weighting and so there is no need to install balance shafts. This results in reduced noise, vibration and less power loss from the engine. Strength is also an advantage of the boxer design – the crankshaft is sandwiched between the left and right hand crankcases and is supported by 5 main bearings. The low and wide engine structure also lowers the vehicle's center of gravity and improves mass distribution.

Working from the crankcases out, the 'phase 2' engine sees the crank thrust bearing relocated to the rear of the shaft – this reduces the transfer of natural frequencies to the transmission, resulting in reduced NVH. Improved off-boost torque comes from a raised static compression ratio – 9.0:1, compared to the Impreza WRX's 8.0:1.

Sequential Turbo Staging

The B4 uses a sequentially staged primary and secondary turbocharger to deliver good throttle response and a wide torque spread. The primary turbo delivers boost in the low rpm and load ranges to deliver 278 N⋅m (205 lb⋅ft) at 2000 rpm, while the secondary turbo joins in above 4000–4500 rpm. With both turbos boosting, a 320 N⋅m (236 lb⋅ft) torque peak arrives at 4800 rpm and maximum power (190 kW (255 hp)) is seen at 6000 rpm. Note that Japanese-market B4s – running on 100-octane fuel – are rated at 206 kW (276 hp).

The primary turbo (located at the left rear of the engine) delivers boost in the low rpm and load range, while the secondary turbo comes in to aid mid-to-high range breathing. During the primary turbo stage, boost pressure is controlled by a conventional arrangement of an ECU-controlled duty-cycle solenoid and an internal wastegate.

The secondary turbo remains inoperative during this stage, as a separate exhaust control valve (situated on the right side of the engine) remains closed. This valve prevents exhaust gasses from entering the secondary turbine.

During the 4000–4500 rpm transitional stage, however, the exhaust control valve is partially opened, bringing the secondary turbo up to near-operating speed. The ECU – working with another duty solenoid and vacuum diaphragm – determines the amount that the exhaust control valve opens. The ECU calculates this amount of valve opening based on the input of a differential pressure sensor that takes feeds from the intake manifold and the outlet of the secondary turbo.

Any boost pressure produced by the secondary turbocharger during the transitional stage is redirected to the atmospheric side of the compressor inlet (between the turbos and air filter).

With the primary turbo continuing to supply manifold pressure and the secondary turbocharger essentially bleeding off the boost it makes during the transition, the ECU will determine when to close the pressure relief valve and fully open the exhaust control valve. Once this is done, the ECU will again look at the input from the differential pressure sensor and open yet another valve – the intake control valve (which is mounted between the secondary turbo's compressor outlet and the intercooler).

With the intake control valve open, boost pressure from the secondary turbo is allowed to pass through the intercooler (in addition to the boost supplied by the primary turbo). Manifold pressure during the second stage of turbocharging remains regulated by the primary turbocharger's wastegate – there is only one turbine by-pass valve in the whole system.

Subaru claims: "The 'staging' between the single and twin-turbo operating range, which was quite noticeable to the driver on the previous model B4, has now largely been 'tuned out' by the careful selection of turbocharger size and the controlling mechanisms. As can be seen from this torque curve, however, under some driving conditions it is still possible to detect a slight reduction in the rate of acceleration in the preparatory or intermediate phase that occurs between 4000–4500 rpm."

The Turbochargers

Despite being called twins, the B4's turbochargers are not identical. The primary turbocharger is an IHI VF33 unit (RHF4 core - floating metal thrust bearing design), which uses a 46.5 / 35.4 mm 9-blade turbine wheel and a 47.0 mm / 35.4 mm 6 + 6 blade compressor. At idle, the turbo spins at around 20,000 rpm and it can go on to a maximum speed of 190,000 rpm. It has a 17 mm diameter wastegate opening to bypass excess exhaust gas. The secondary turbocharger is an IHI VF32 (RHF4B core - ball bearing design). On the exhaust side it uses a 46.5 / 35.4 mm 9-blade turbine wheel, teamed with a 52.5 / 36.6 mm 10-blade compressor wheel. It's rated at 180,000 rpm.

Intercooling

Like the WRX, the B4 uses a bonnet scoop to feed a top-mount air-to-air intercooler. Manufactured by Sanden, the intercooler has an effective depth of 73 mm, a width of 140 mm and a length of 370 mm. With 26 tubes to take induction air from one end-tank to the other, the unit has a 13.37 kW heat transfer capacity and reduces 120–130 degree Celsius charge air to 70–80 degrees Celsius (claimed).

Gearbox and Driveline

Australian-delivered Liberty B4s come with a longitudinally mounted 5-speed manual gearbox only. It is essentially the same unit that was introduced in MY99 models (which saw the most changes since the Liberty was introduced in 1990).

Amongst its list of improvements is increased case rigidity and twice the number of bolts attaching it to the engine (eight instead of four). The synchromesh baulk ring, gear docking teeth angles and the double cone synchro on 2nd and 3rd gear have also all been retuned.

The B4's 'S type' close-ratio gearset has taller ratios in the first three cogs than the Impreza WRX, but a shorter 4.11:1 final drive ratio counters some of this effect. The gears are now cold forged and shot peened for added strength and a flexible flywheel design is now incorporated to reduce engine vibration reaching the driveline. The pull-type 230 mm single plate clutch has increased torque capacity thanks to an 830 kg clamping load pressure plate.

The B4's AWD layout is traditional Subaru. The viscous limited-slip center coupling apportions front-to-rear torque 50:50. Torque distribution at the road, however, is dependent on load distribution and tyre grip. As a result, the static straight driving ratio is 60:40 front-to-rear. Under dynamic driving conditions, however, the torque distribution varies accordingly. The viscous coupling senses rotational speed difference between the front and rear axles and transmits torque to the end with the most grip (which has lesser axle rpm).

A rear viscous LSD is also used to improve high-speed stability and traction during low-speed cornering.

Suspension

The B4 is suspended on the same platform as other Liberty models – MacPherson struts under the front and an all-new multi-link rear Chapman strut arrangement. The front suspension incorporates cast aluminium L-shaped transverse links and the cross member features a newly devised 'performance rod'. The performance rod is a lateral brace, which improves side-axis stiffness by 500 percent and longitudinal stiffness by 50 percent. This provides more constant suspension geometry under hard cornering. The rear suspension, too, receives an additional support sub-frame to improve rear suspension lateral and longitudinal stiffness (by 200 percent and 20 percent respectively).

The struts are inverted to deliver higher bending rigidity (thanks to larger damping tube diameter) and less damping fade as a result of increased piston size. Springs are mounted offset so their centerline coincides with the pivot axis. This reduces road shock and – by minimizing bump and rebound friction – provides less vibration.

The B4's initial spring, damper, and swaybar specifications were devised in Japan and later tuned at the Nürburgring circuit. It's said the target was to at least equal the performance of the BMW M3.

Braking

The B4 is slowed by 294mm ventilated front disc brakes and twin-pot floating calipers and 290mm ventilated rear discs and single-pot floating calipers. An increased diameter vacuum assisted tandem booster gives reduced pedal effort though relatively firm braking feel (see graph). The system is diagonally linked to maintain safety in the event one line should fail, and front and rear pressure control valve are used to balance braking force to suit weight distribution. Maximum braking deceleration from 100 km/h is 0.99g with a 39.4 metre stopping distance.

The B4's standard anti-lock braking system is Bosch's 5.3i system (which is made under license by Nippon ABS). It's a 4-channel, 3-phase system with the front wheels controlled individually, while the rears are controlled jointly (through the 'select low' method). The select low method uses the rear wheel with the lower coefficient of adhesion to calculate the brake line pressure applied to both of the rear wheels.

The aforementioned 'select low' method of rear braking force, together with electronically delayed buildup of braking force at the front wheel with a high adhesion coefficient and negative steering roll radius, maximises chassis stability under braking.

Electronics

A combined key, remote central locking transmitter and immobiliser transponder protects the Liberty B4 from theft. Once the key is inserted into the ignition barrel and switched on, an antenna amplifier (positioned around the ignition barrel) reads the transponder code and transmits it to the engine management system. Without the correct code sequence, the engine is not allowed to start.

In addition to the key immobilizer, Subaru Australia also installs a dual-stage security system (as came fitted to previous Impreza STis). The remote locking transmitter represents the first stage of security, while a console-mounted numerical keypad forms the second stage. To disarm the 6 points of immobilization, the correct four-digit code must be entered into the keypad. The system also features an anti-hijack, mode, intrusion alert, false alarm prevention, internal screamer siren, infrasonic sensor, valet mode, and anti cross-pollination software.

The B4's instrument cluster is backlit and delivers excellent visibility under all conditions. The clock rings, pointers, and the calibration data are sequentially illuminated once the ignition is switched on.

American car audio company McIntosh spent 12 months in Japan customizing a sound system to suit the acoustics of the B4. The double-DIN head unit incorporates a single CD player, tuner, and cassette deck, while some units also had a mini disc player. The system features a high-performance digital to analog (D/A) converter, 20-bit Burr-Brown chips, Dolby B noise reduction (tape), dual-antenna AM/FM radio, and McIntosh's Power Guard technology, which gives low distortion at high sound pressure levels. A 6-band, 4-channel parametric equalizer has also been tuned specifically for the B4.

An electronically controlled rear muffler is used to keep the B4 quiet at low road speeds. The pipe that leads into the rear muffler is divided in two, with one pipe equipped with a flapper valve. The ECU – working with an actuator and cable – opens this valve when traveling at medium-to-high road speeds. This increases exhaust gas flow.

=== D-Type ===
The fourth revision of the third-generation Legacy, introduced in 2001, made several subtle but important changes to the front of the car. The grille and headlights were altered slightly, making interchangeability with Revisions A-C style headlights impossible. The headlights in the Japanese market kept using HID bulbs as in previous years, but the shape of the headlight was altered slightly. The grille was made slightly taller than the A-C models, and the shape of the bumper around the grille was altered slightly to accommodate a lower joint where the hood and bumper meet. Consistent with previous models, the HID headlights had a dashboard-mounted adjustment switch that allowed the driver to re-aim the headlights to reduce glare to approaching traffic, although the switches were altered slightly internally to adjust for the increase in power needed to adjust the new style headlights. The bonnet became a lighter aluminum alloy, similar to that available on the STI's at the time. Compression and timing changed in order to further reduce the effect of loss of boost during the switch over from the primary to secondary stages. The ECU also got an upgrade, as it is now tunable by the manufacturer or third-party tuning workshops. Additional optional extras were offered upon purchase including but not limited to; a new body kit, headlight surrounds, and 4-pot brakes – the stock wheels were designed to accommodate this upgrade. The D-Type Legacy is Subaru's best shot at the sequential twin-turbo engine besides the STI revision.

== Trims ==
=== North America ===
Brighton

Available only for 2000 in the United States and 2001 in Canada, the Brighton was the lowest trim level of the legacy wagon available. It came standard with a 165 hp (123 kW) SOHC EJ252 and a 5-speed manual transmission, rear drum brakes, steel wheels with hubcaps, an AM/FM radio and cassette, and other basic features but lacked roof rails, a tachometer, wiring for keyless entry, power locks, cruise control, and some other features that were available on the L trim.

L

For most of this generation, the L was the lowest trim package available. From 2000 to 2002, it can be identified with unpainted plastic body molding, door handles, and mirrors. It came standard with the features from the Brighton, plus features that were mentioned as excluded from the Brighton trim, rear disc brakes, and larger tires. From 2003 to 2004, the L had gained standard features in the Special Edition (2003) and 35th Anniversary Edition (2004) such as the "snowflake" style 16" alloy rims from the 2000 to 2002 GT, painted plastic body molding, door handles, and mirrors, dual sunroofs on the wagon and a single sunroof on the sedan, simulated interior wood trim, a CD player, leather-wrapped shift handle and steering wheel, and other features only previously available on the GT.

GT

The GT (2.5GT for 2004) is a trim level that featured larger front brake discs than the standard trim, single beam dual bulb halogen headlights, foglights, sportier suspension, GT specific sideskirts, and a viscous limited-slip rear differential, as well as simulated wood interior trim. The engine is the same 2.5 L naturally aspirated EJ251 engine found in the L and Brighton trim. In 2003, the Sportshift 4-Speed Automatic with Variable Torque Distribution was introduced as an option on the GT.

GT Limited

The GT Limited is a package offered from 2000 to 2002 that had the same additions as the GT trim and added the factory all-weather package. This included features like heated seats, de-icer, and mirror defrosters, but retained the same EJ251 engine. This trim level was dropped for 2003 and features standard on the Limited became standard on the GT. This package was only available for the sedan.

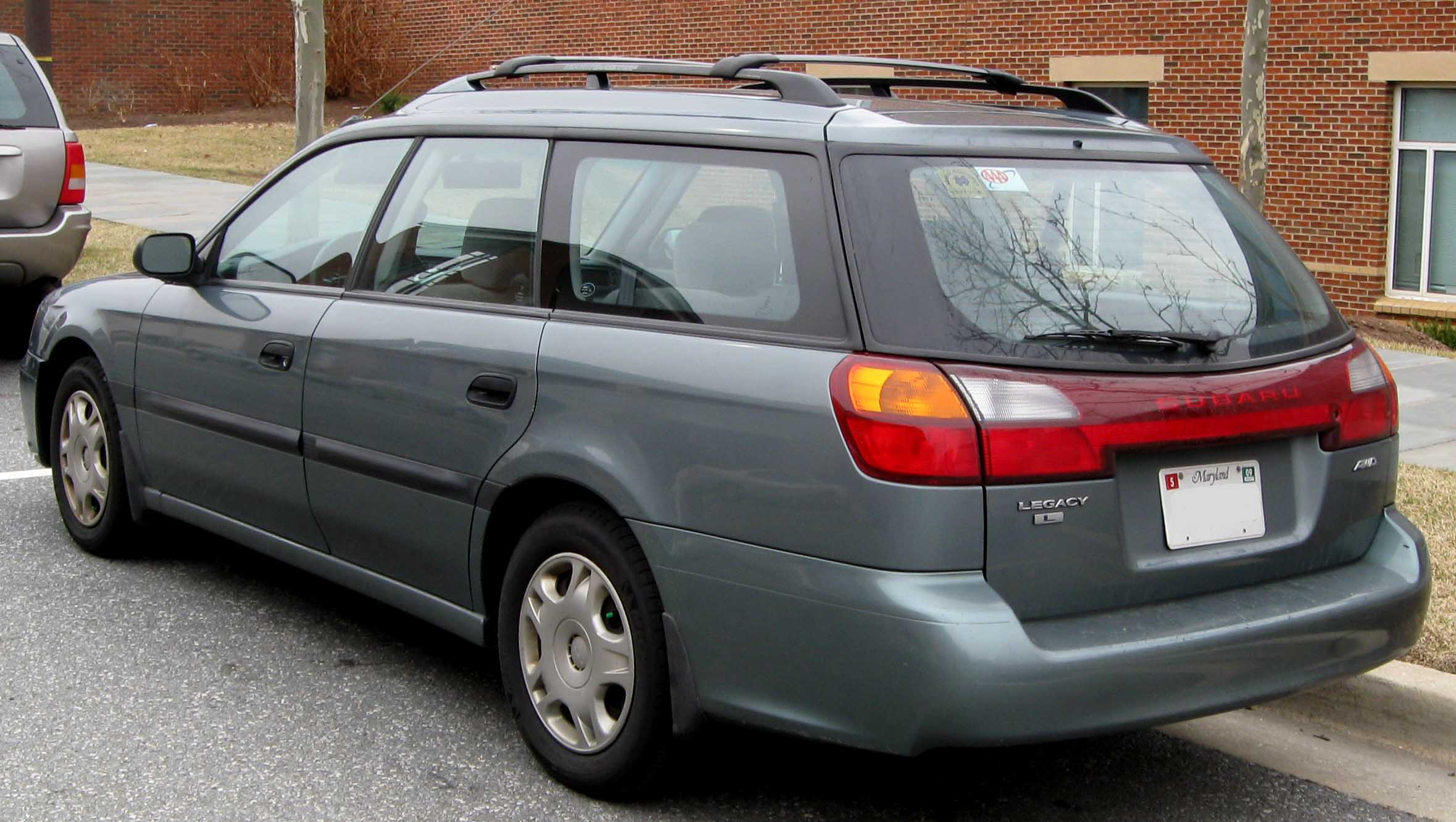
2000–2002 Subaru Legacy L wagon

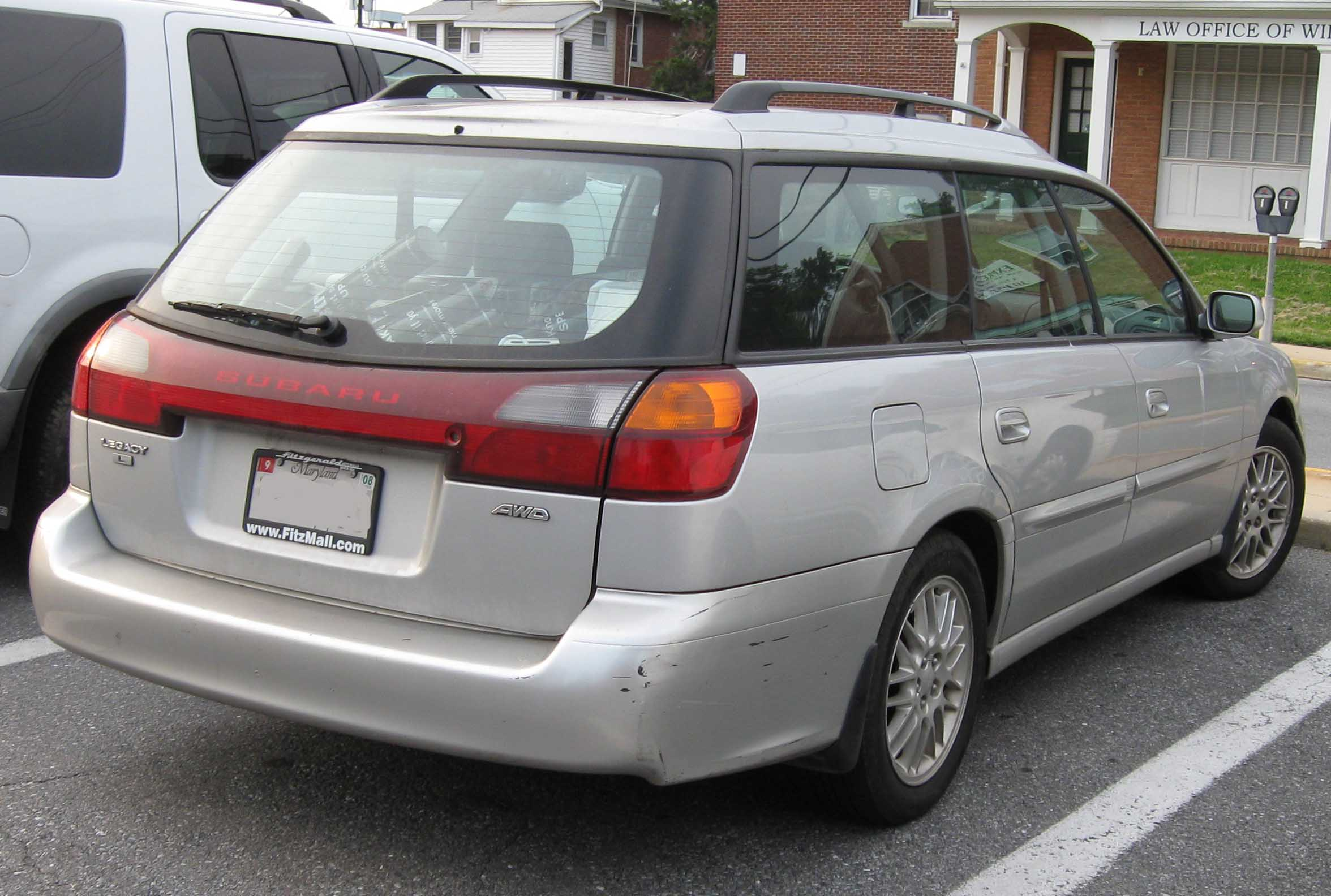
2003–2004 Subaru Legacy L wagon

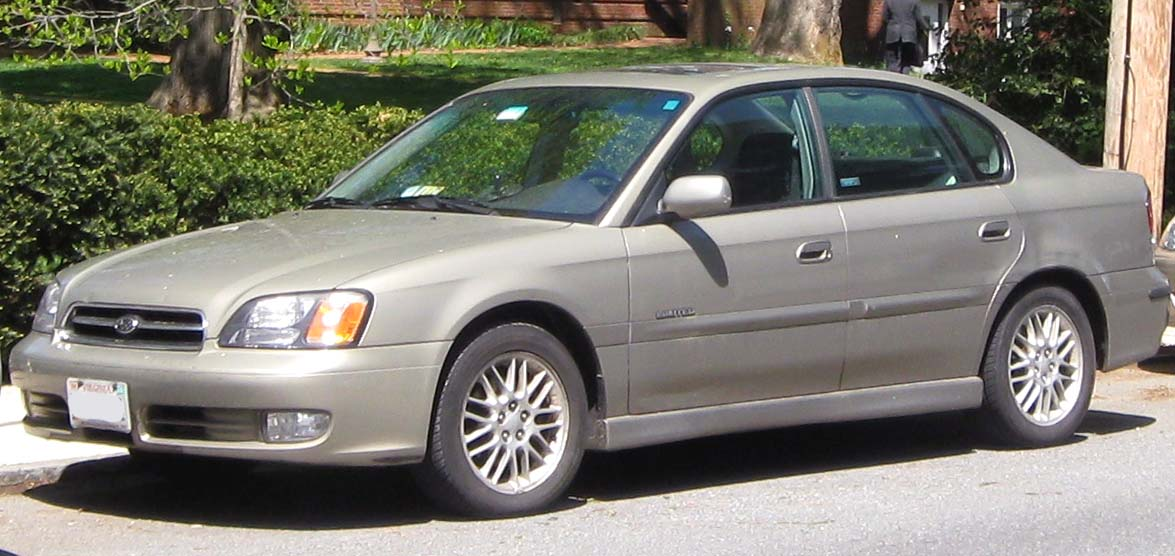
2000–2002 Subaru Legacy GT Limited sedan

=== Japan ===
TX

The TX was the lowest trim package available in Japan, being equivalent to the early USDM L trim. It included dual-beam single bulb headlights, unpainted plastic door handles, mirrors, and body molding, an AM/FM cassette radio, steel wheels with hubcaps, and manual climate controls. A 135 hp (101 kW) 2.0 L naturally aspirated SOHC "lean-burn" EJ201 was used. An S Package was available that upgraded the grille to the touring wagon-style grille and added foglights, alloy wheels, painted door handles, mirrors, and body molding.

Brighton

The Brighton added to the TX. This trim featured automatic climate control, upgraded 15" mesh alloy rims, foglights, and a standard CD player. It retained the same 2.0 L engine. The JDM Brighton got unique badging, unlike the USDM Brighton.

Brighton S

The Brighton S was an upgraded Brighton and featured a sportier look with painted body molding and single beam dual bulb headlights.

250T

The 250T wagon featured an upgraded 170 hp (130 kW) DOHC 2.5 L naturally aspirated EJ254 along with an upgraded stereo, Momo steering wheel, single-beam dual bulb headlights, and simulated woodgrain dash trim.

250T-B

The 250T-B is a version of the 250T upgraded with Bilstein struts and "snowflake" alloy rims featured on USDM Legacies.

GT

The GT is a tuned version of the Legacy Touring Wagon, using a 265 hp (198 kW) 2.0 L twin-turbo EJ206 if equipped with an automatic or 276 hp (206 kW) EJ208 if equipped with a manual.

RS

The RS was an upgrade over the standard B4 with a 155 hp (116 kW) naturally aspirated DOHC 2.0 L EJ204.

RS25

The RS25 was a performance model featuring an upgraded 170 hp (130 kW) naturally aspirated DOHC 2.5 L EJ254 along with Bilstein shocks.

RSK

The RSK sedan featured the twin-turbo EJ20 from the Legacy GT, along with Bilstein shocks. RSK stands for Rally Sport Kompressor, as Kompressor represents the twin-turbo.

TS Type R

Available in both wagon and sedan form, the TS Type R featured a 155 hp (116 kW) naturally aspirated DOHC 2.0 L EJ204 with a sportier appearance, similar to a GTB without the hood scoop.

GT30/RS30

The GT30 wagon and RS30 sedan were introduced in 2001 for the 2002 model year as Revision D models. They featured the EZ30 and are identifiable by their unique grille. They were only available with an automatic and came standard with VDC.

GT VDC Basic spec GT twin-turbo, but came with Subaru's own traction & stability control VDC (third generation)VDC, (Vehicle Dynamics Control). These models were only available in Auto.

GT-B The GT-B is a further enhanced version of the GT Wagon. The "B" in the name refers to the Bilstein struts that the car was equipped with. An E-Tune package was available giving a stiffer chassis and longer gearing for better fuel economy. The E-Tune II was introduced in 2001 as a 2002 model for Revision D and featured a stiffer chassis and other upgrades. Vehicles with the Bilstein shocks had a small Bilstein badge attached to the rear of the vehicle, below the "GT" badge. They featured some different interior options, larger brakes and wheels, and more.

Legacy Wagon Avignon Concept (2001) It was a concept car named after an area in Southern France, based on the wagon body. It includes a cobalt blue body, naturally aspirated 2.5 L engine, a unique body kit, wheels, and interior accents, such as clay-colored seats and a light-colored dashboard.

The vehicle was unveiled in 2001 at the 35th annual Tokyo Motor Show.

Legacy STi S401 version (2002) It is a limited (400 unit target, 286 actually produced) version sedan built by STI division. It includes a twin sequential turbo 2.0 L EJ208 engine and a 6-speed manual transmission.

The S401 model also featured Brembo brakes and 18" X 7.5" BBS alloy wheels.

Blitzen (2000–2003) The Blitzen model ("Blitz" is German for lightning) was the result of a collaboration with design house Porsche Design, and featured many unique parts and paint schemes, and was the top-level luxury sport package from Subaru, using items from their STi performance division. The wheels, body kit, and interior were all designed by this German group. It also featured an implementation of Aisin Seiki's new sequential automatic gearbox, the first use of sequential-shifting on a production Subaru model. The model was refreshed in 2002 with an updated design. The model was refreshed again in 2003 with the interior designed by Andreas Zapatinas.

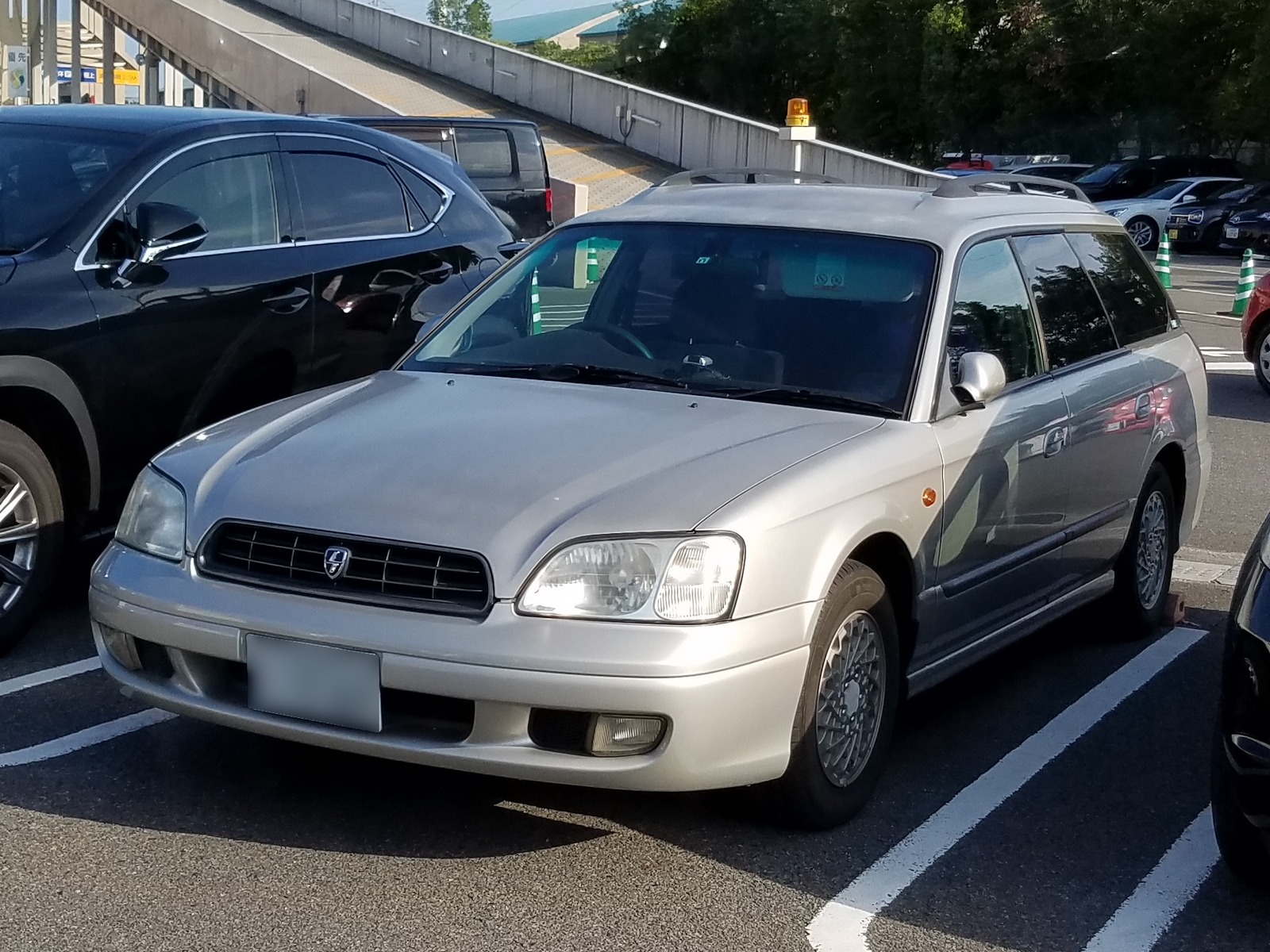
Brighton (A Type) (Front)

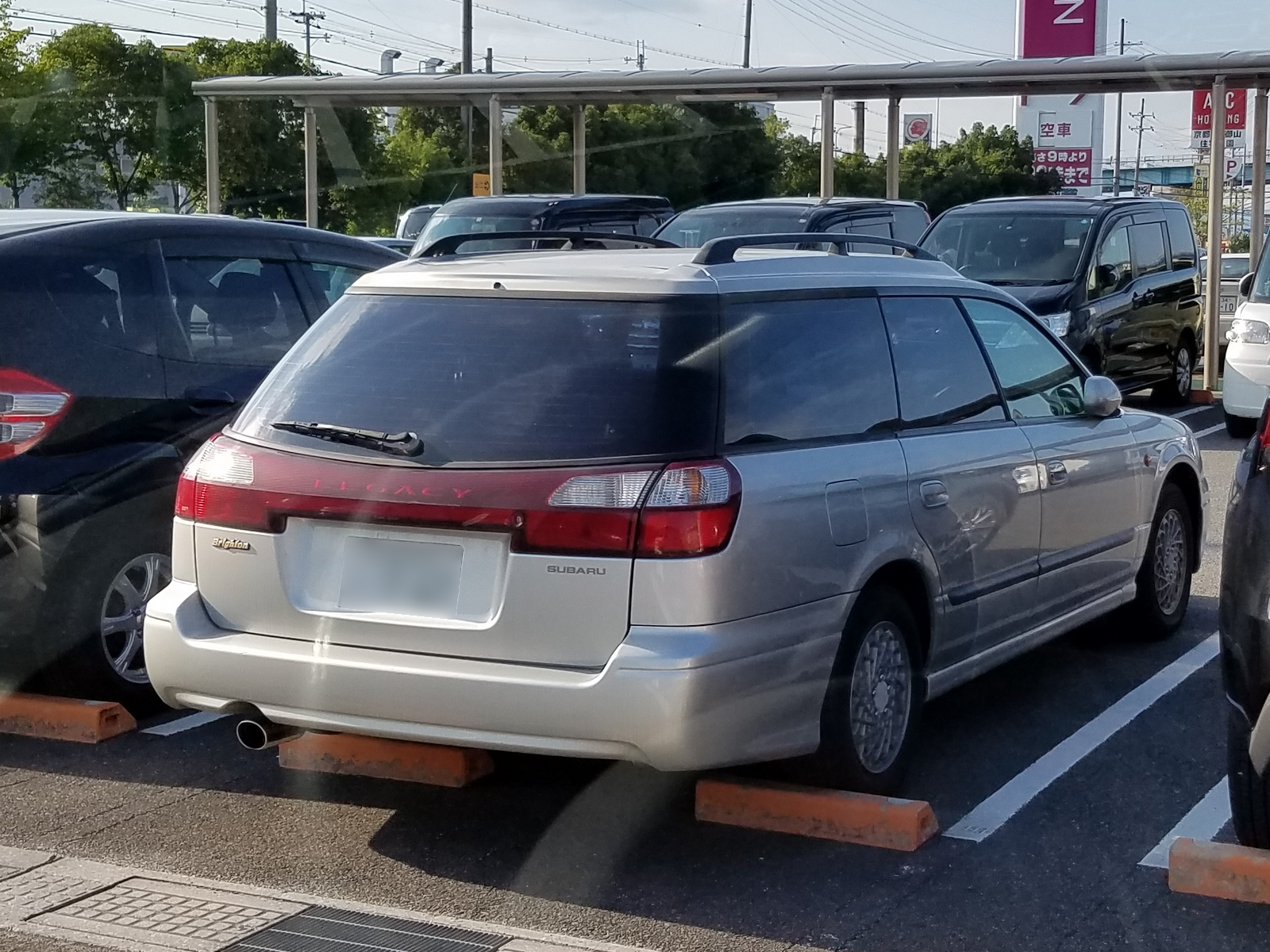
Brighton (A Type) (Rear)

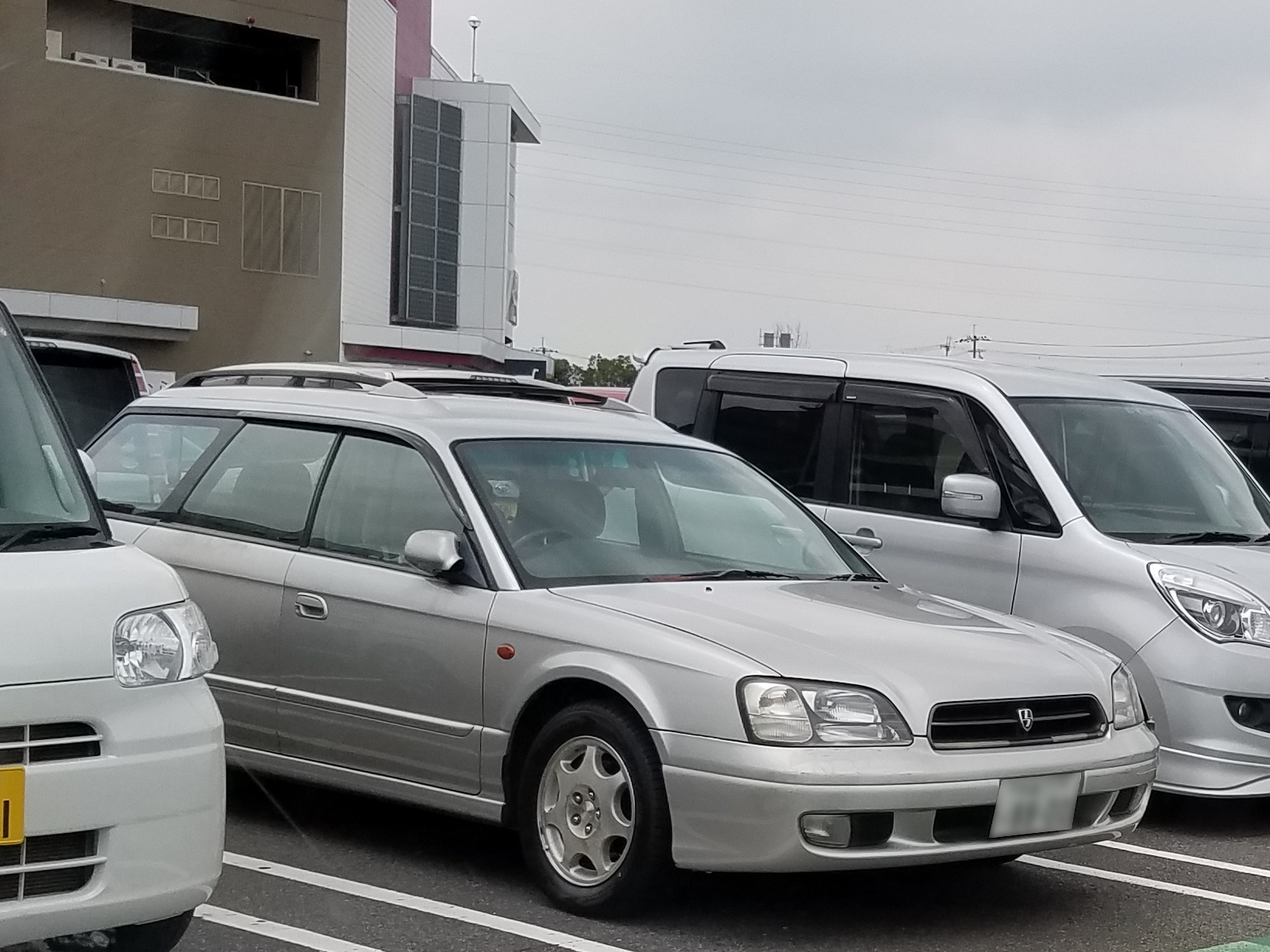
Brighton S (A Type)

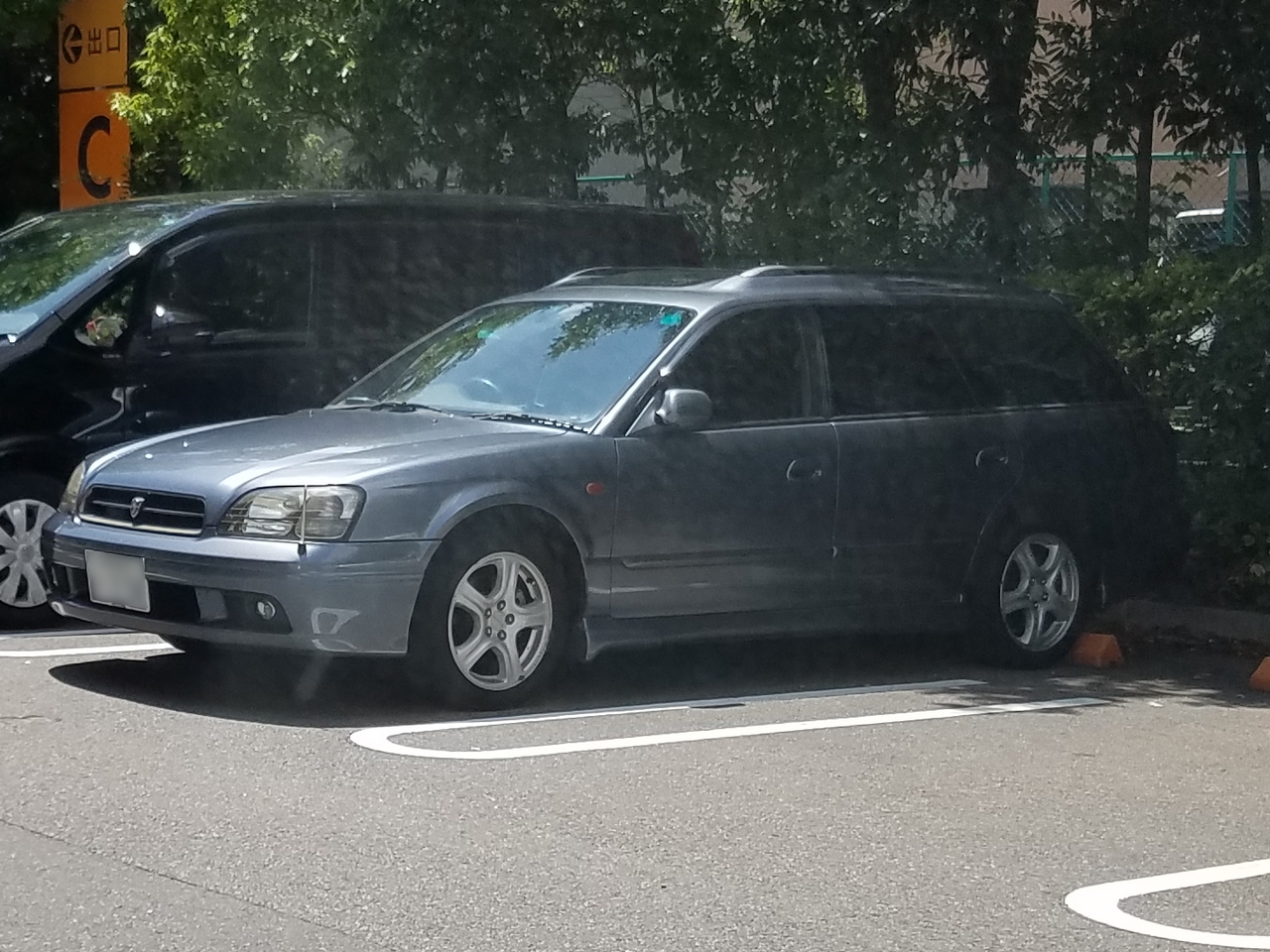
TS-R (B type)

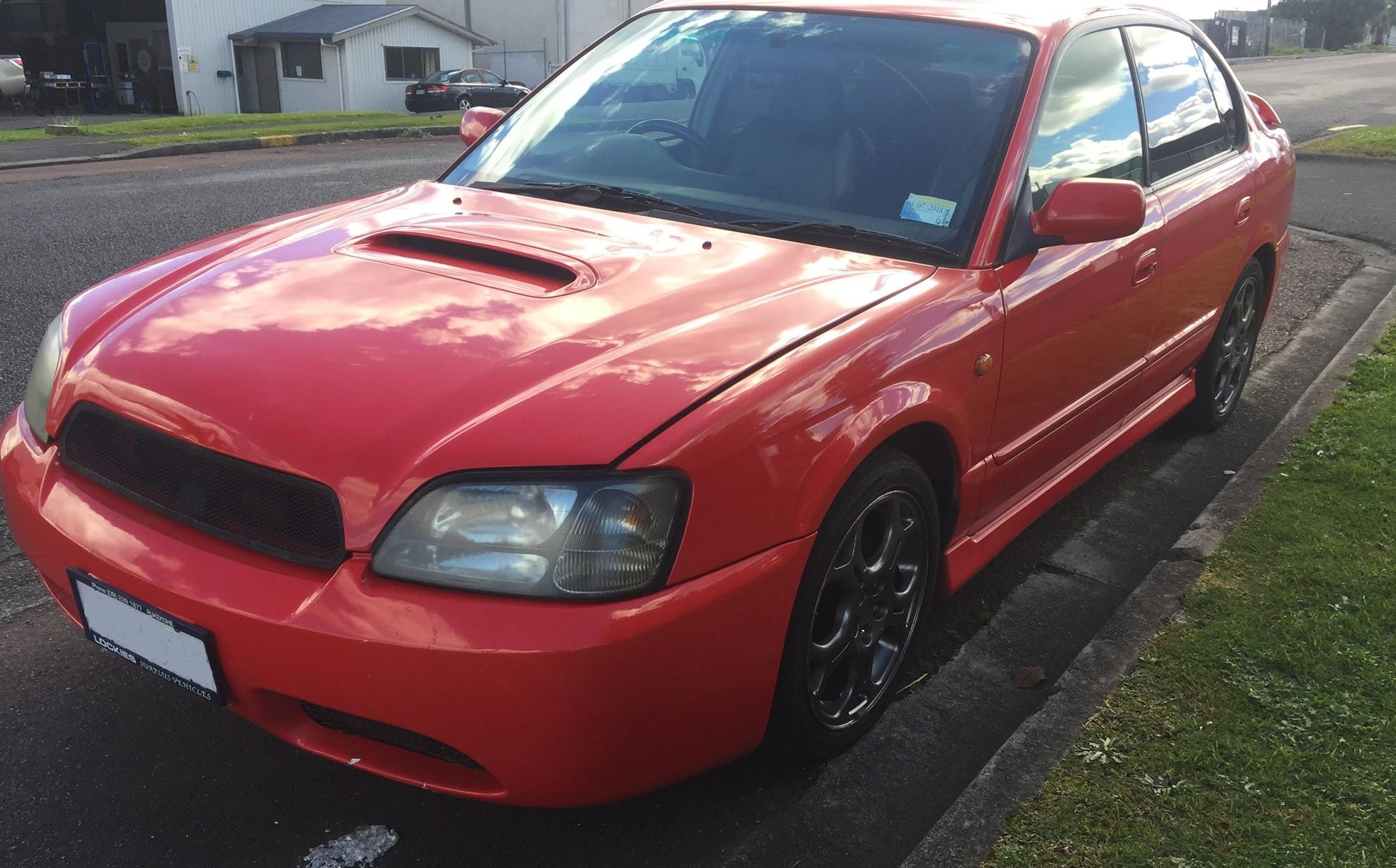
Japanese market 2000 Blitzen

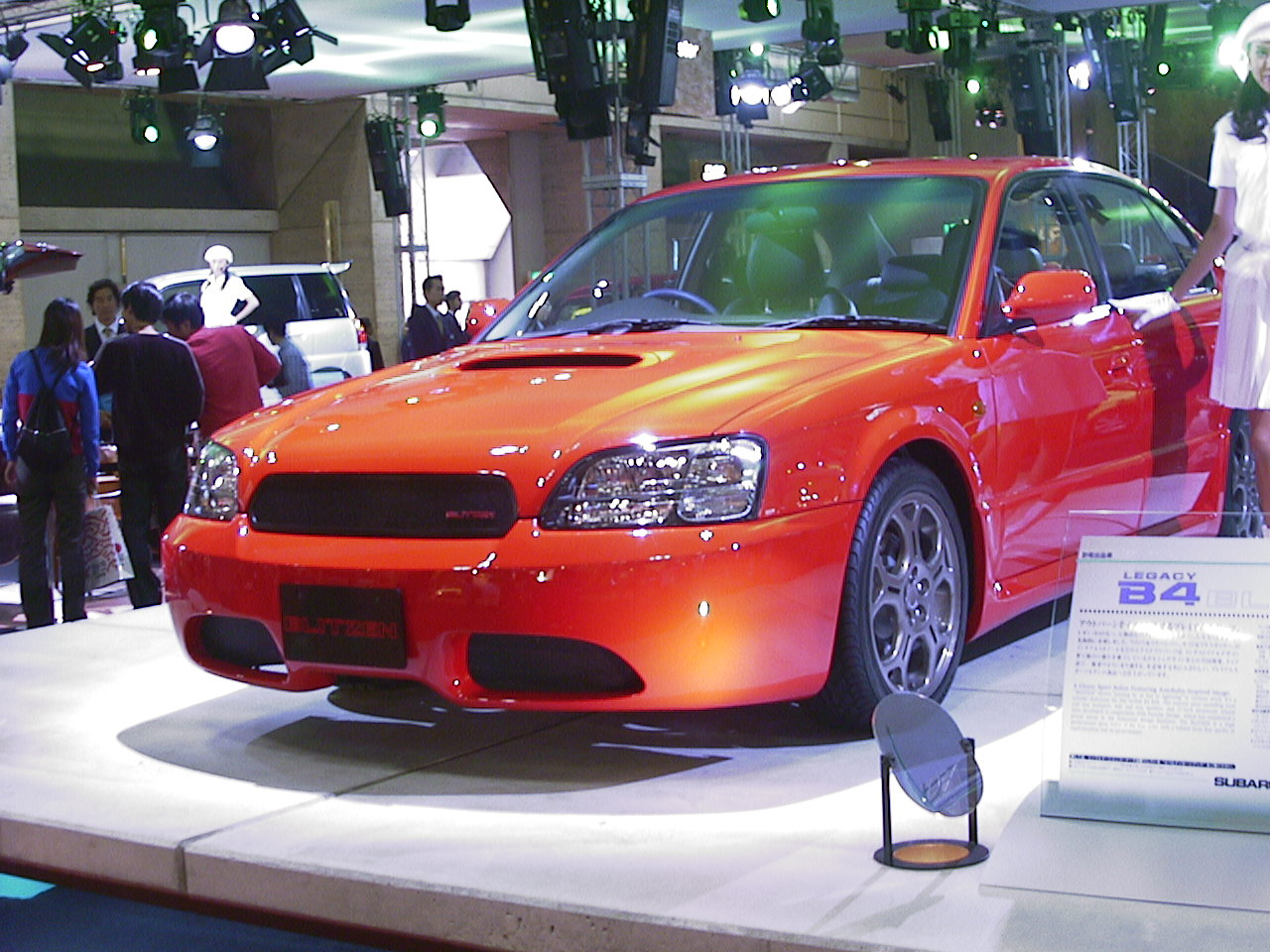
Subaru Legacy Blitzen (Front), Taken at the 1999 Tokyo Motor Show.

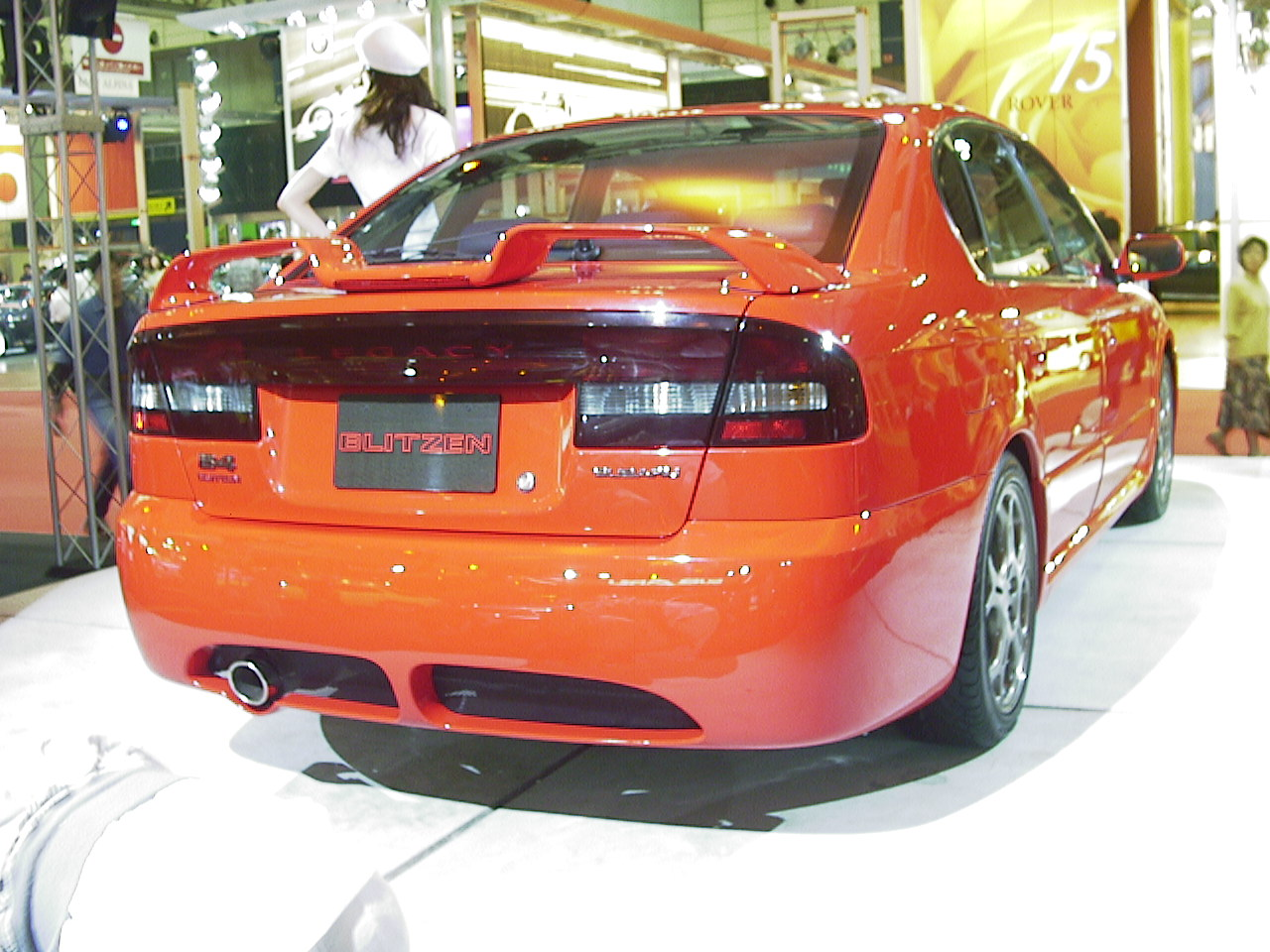
Subaru Legacy Blitzen (Rear), Taken at the 1999 Tokyo Motor Show.

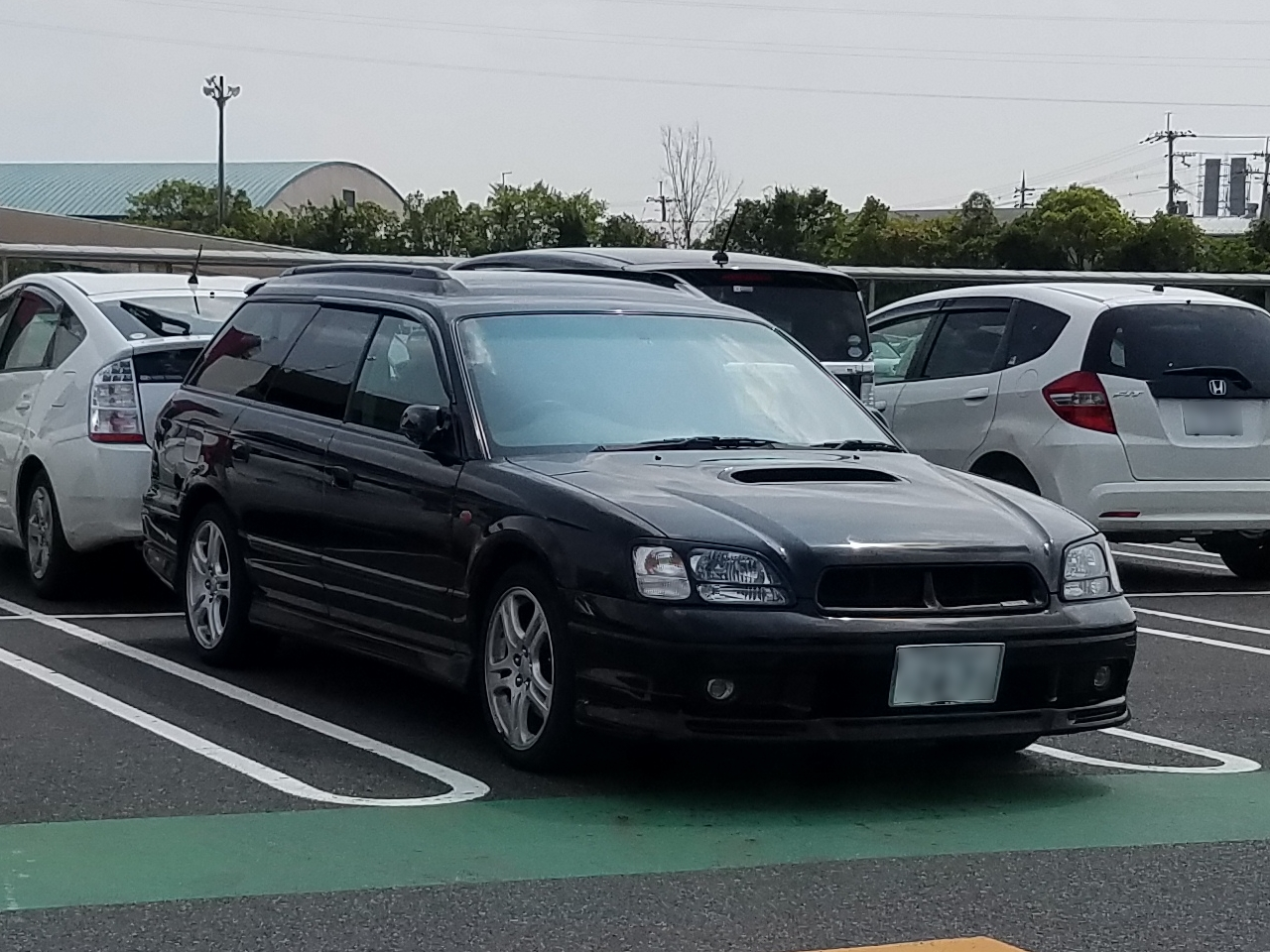
GT-B (A type) RFRB (Run Fast, Run Beautiful) aero equipped vehicle

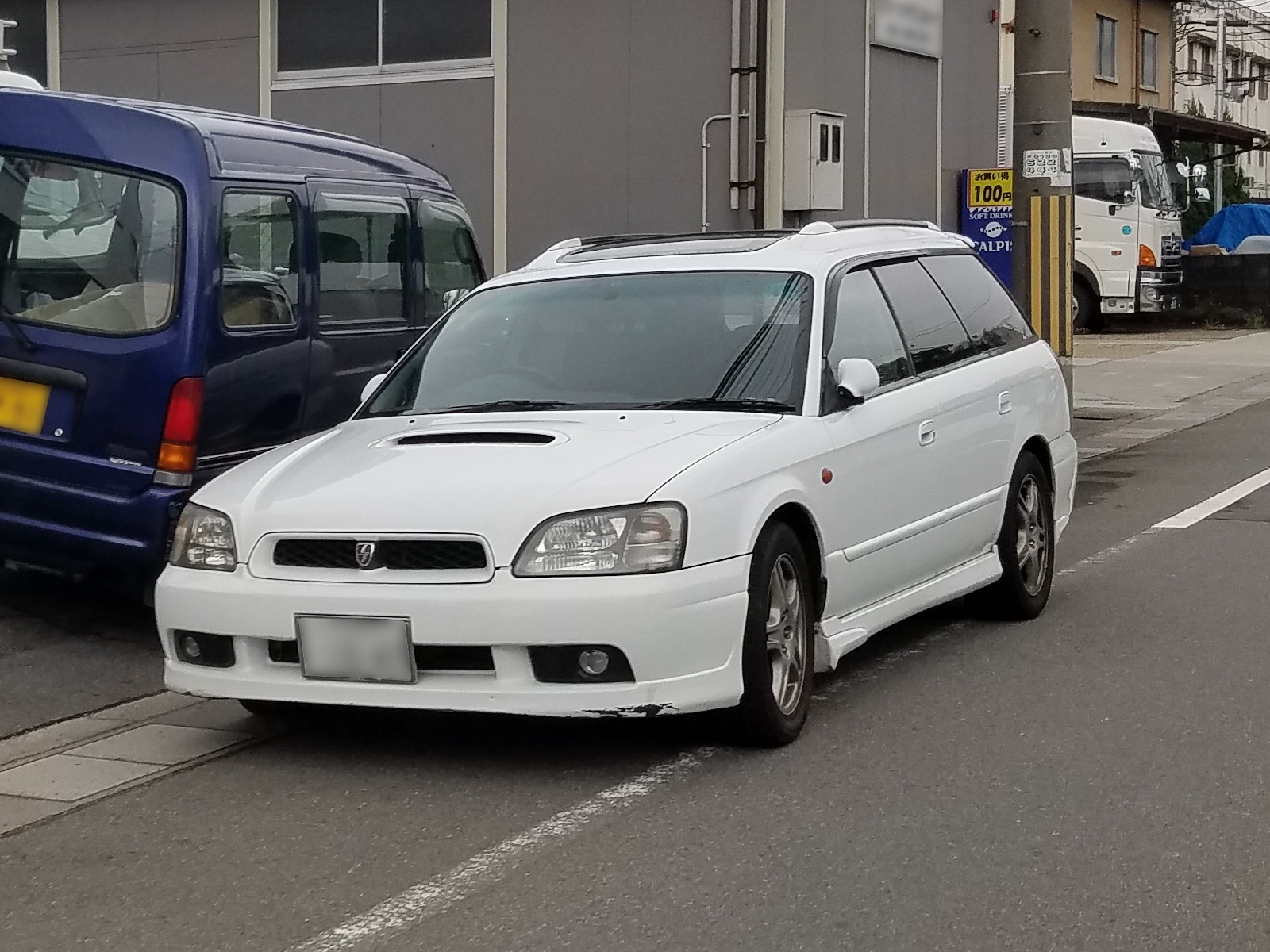
GT Limited (C type)

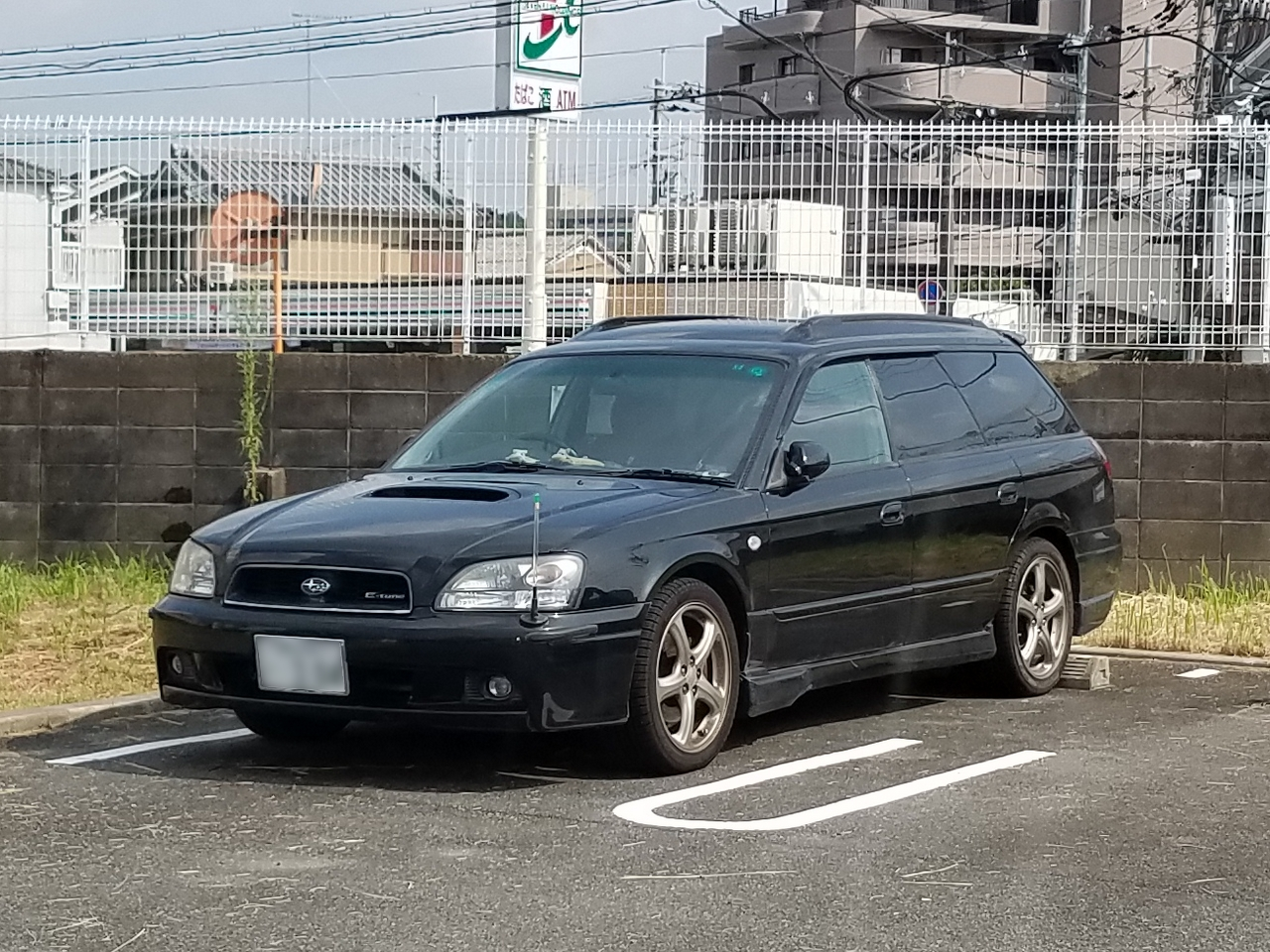
GT-B E-Tune II (D type)

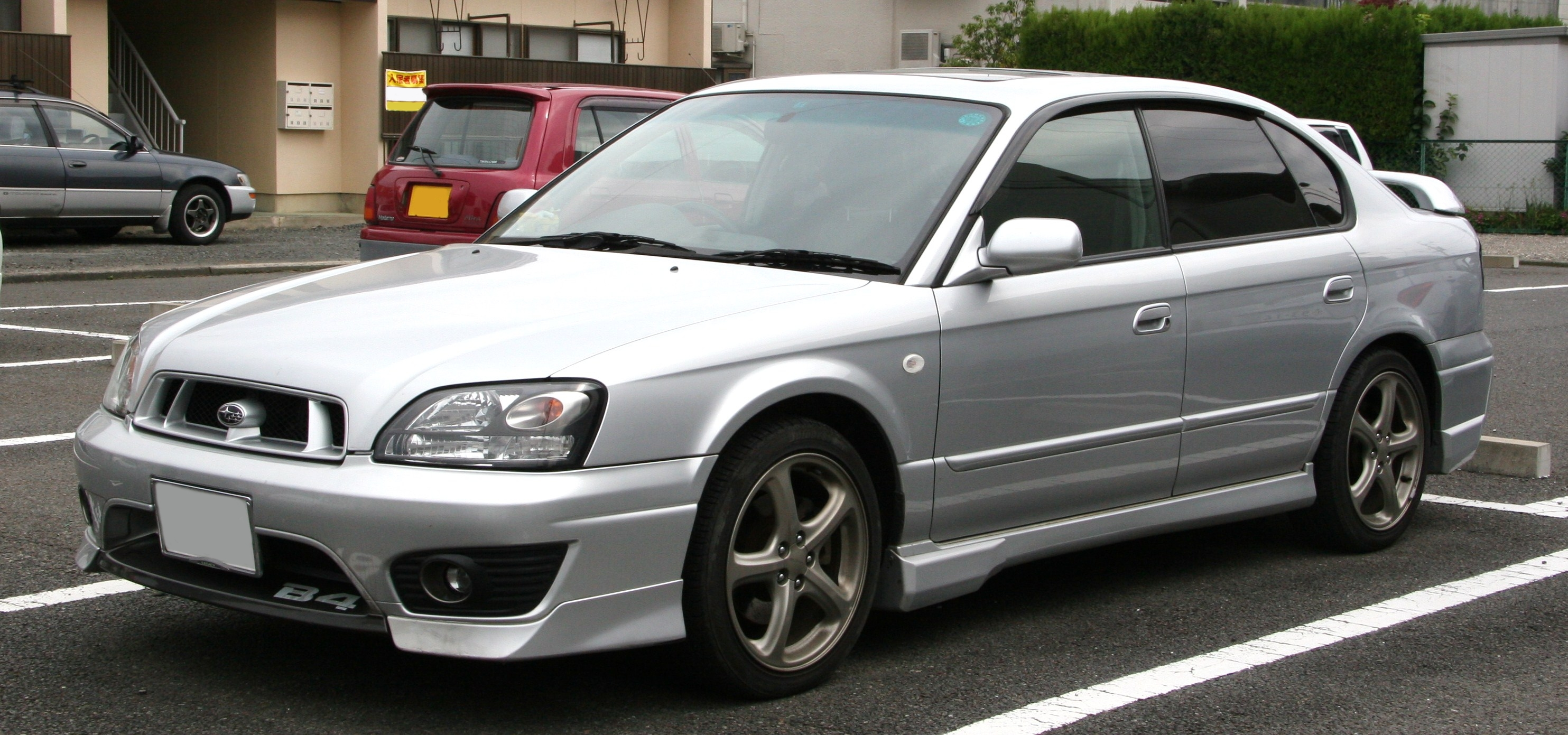
B4 RS (D type) (Front) (With aero grille, aero front bumper and aero side skirts)

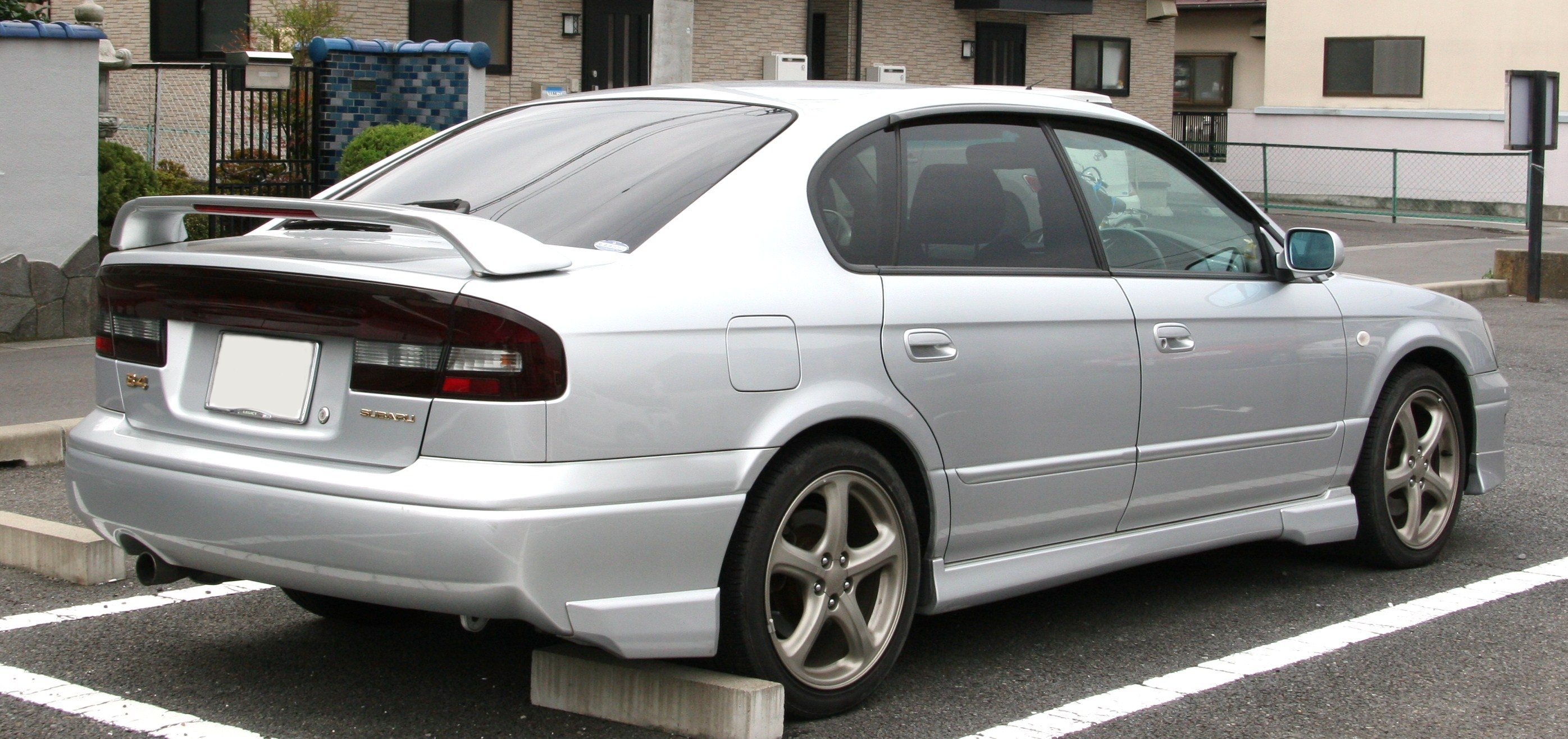
B4 RS (D type) (Rear) (With aero side skirt and aero rear bumper)

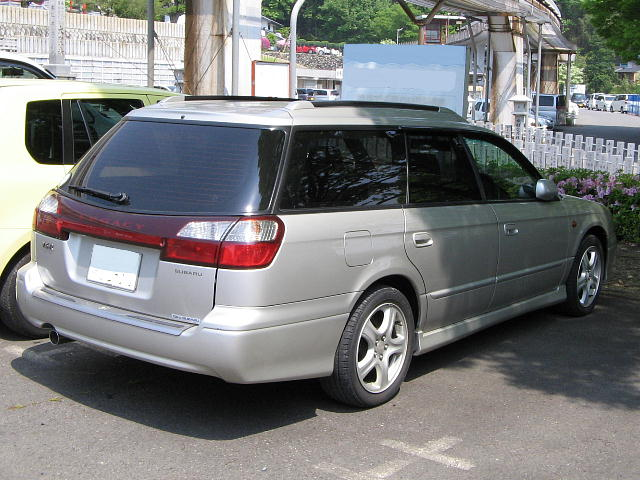
1998–2004 Subaru Legacy Touring Wagon with clear rear turn signal lenses and amber bulbs

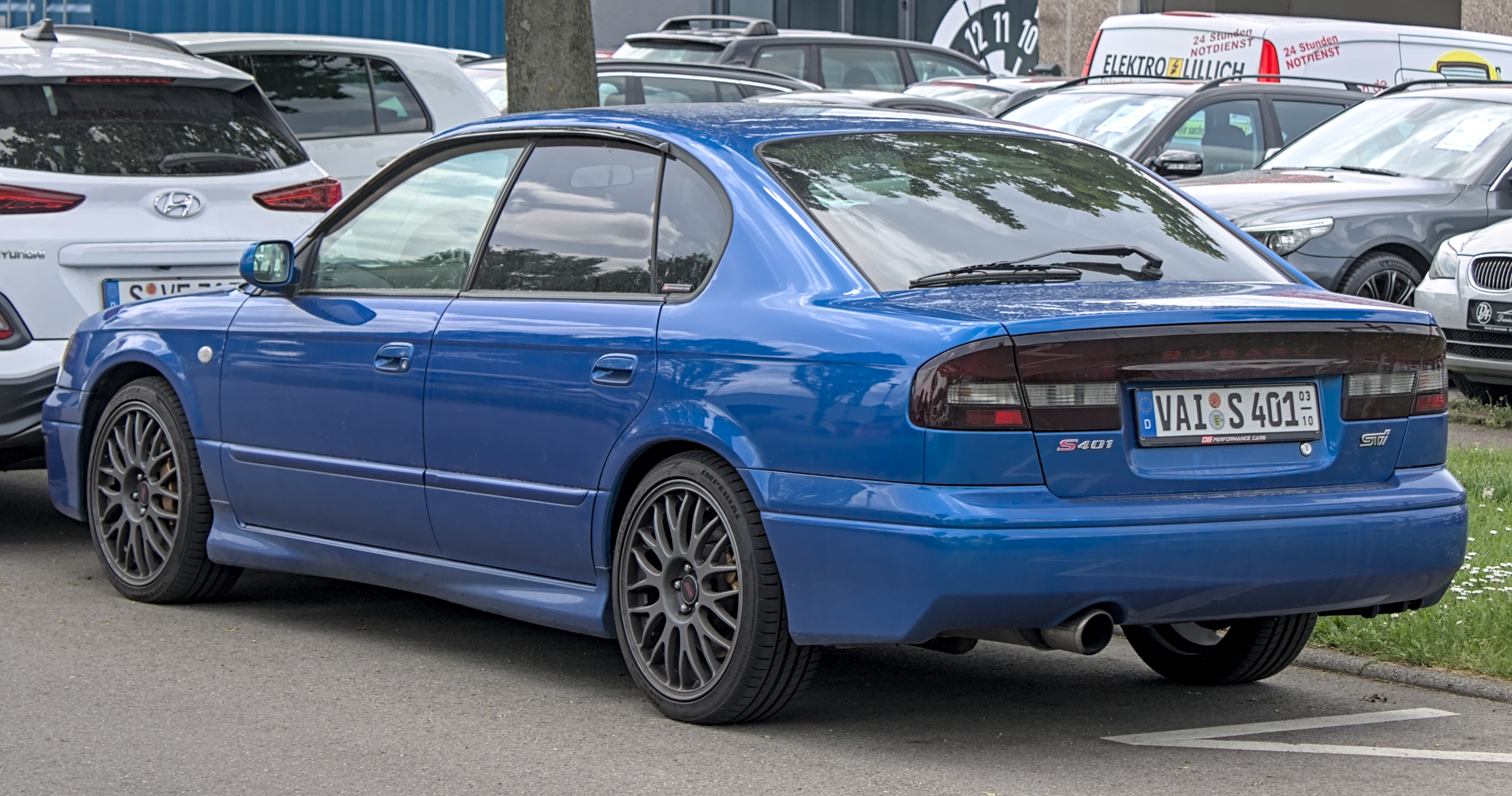
STi S401 (Rear)

=== Europe ===
GL

This was the lowest trim available outside of domestic and North American markets. It came standard with manual climate controls, an AM/FM cassette stereo, rear drum brakes, and a 125 hp (93 kW) 2.0 L SOHC EJ20E. 125 hp (93 kW)

GX

The GX came standard with a 153 hp (114 kW) 2.5 L SOHC EJ251, automatic climate controls and an upgraded CD player. VDC and leather were options.

GX Limited

== Baja ==
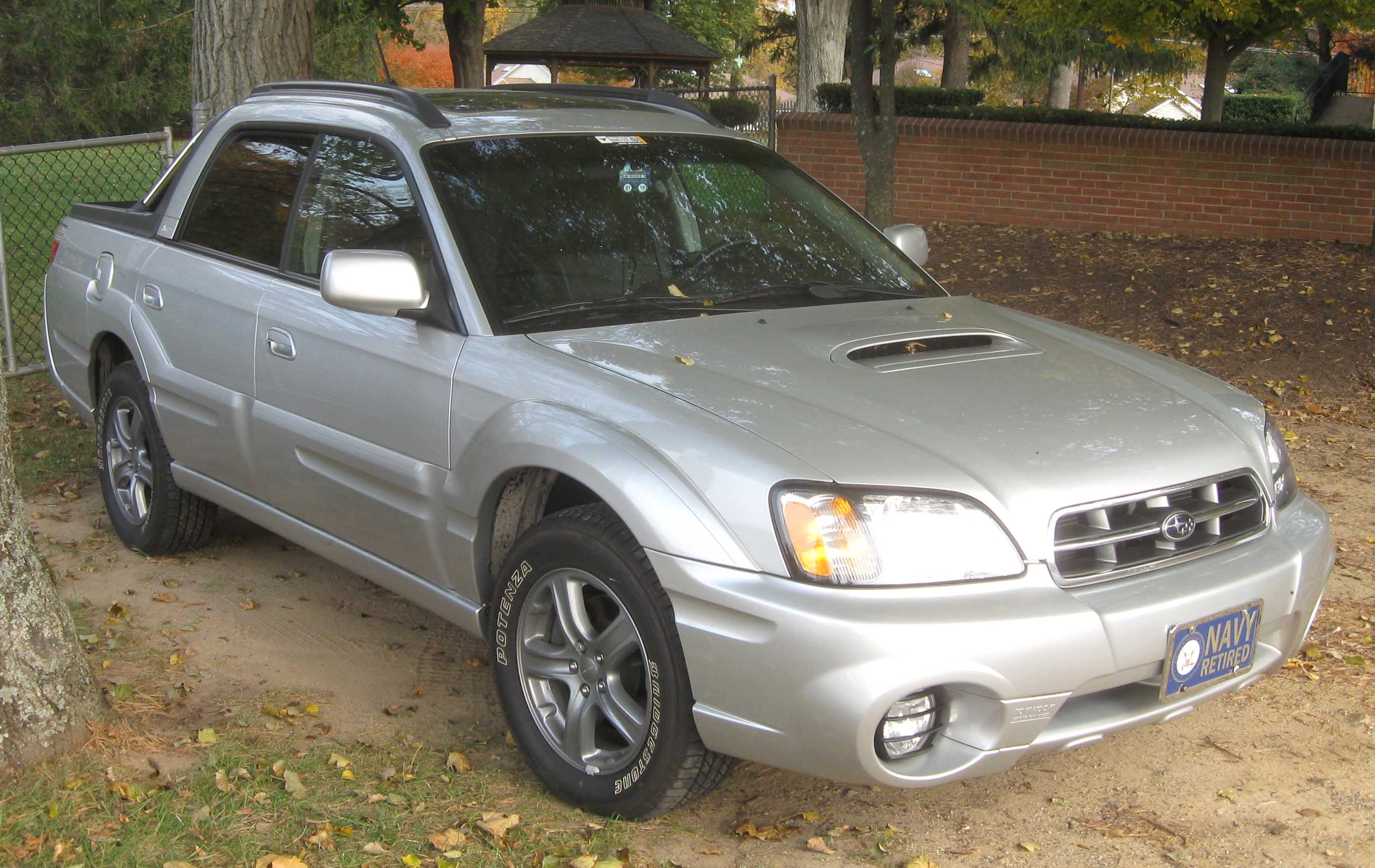
Subaru Baja

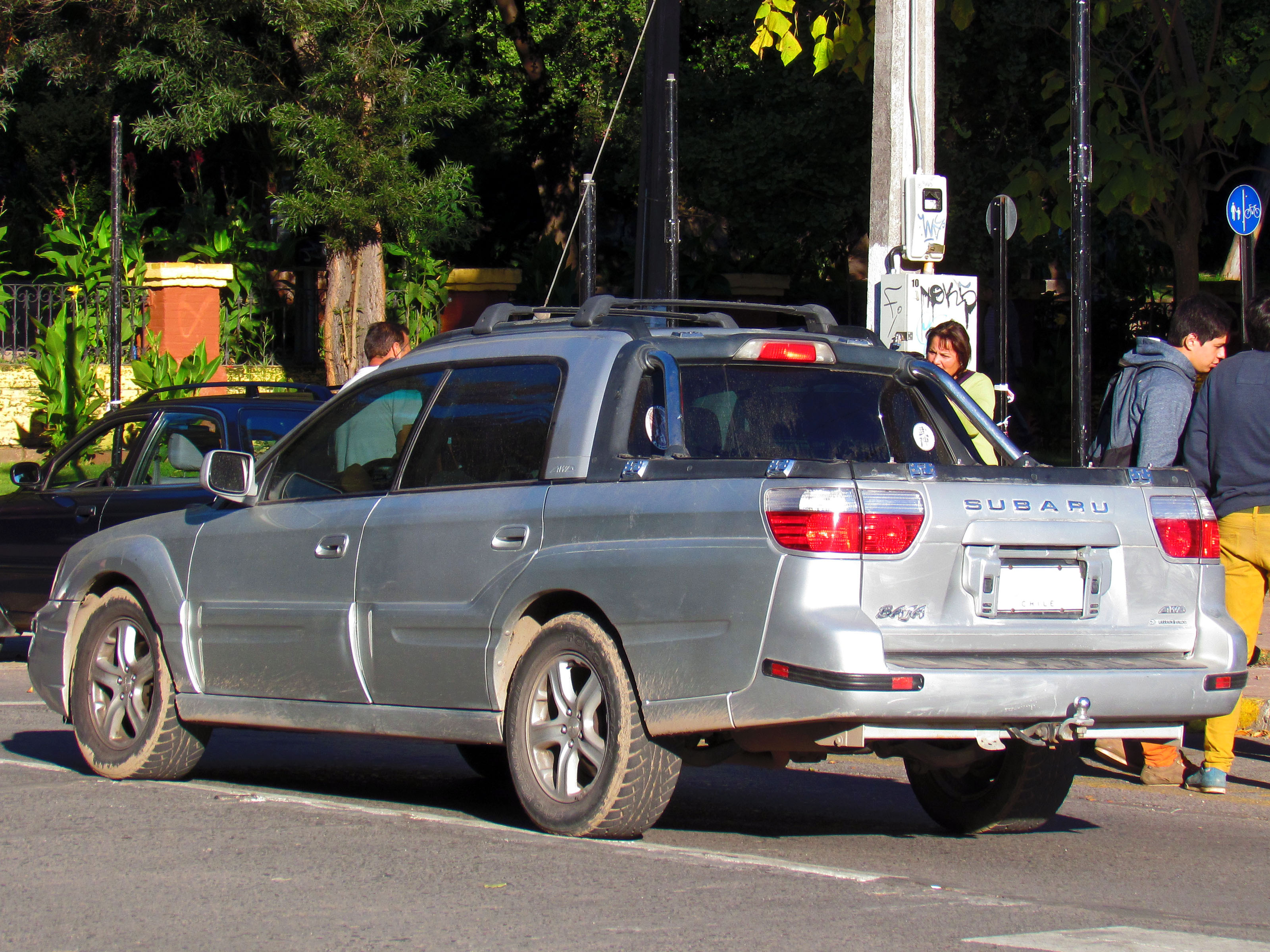
Subaru Baja

Subaru developed a four-door coupé utility (pickup) version of the Outback with all-wheel-drive, known as the "Subaru Baja" (pronounced ba-ha). Manufactured from 2002 to 2006 and marketed for the 2003 through to 2006 model years, the Baja combined the handling and passenger carrying characteristics of a traditional passenger car with the open-bed versatility, and to a lesser degree, load capacity of a pickup truck. Subaru marketed the Baja in the United States, Canada, and Chile.

The unibody design borrowed heavily from the existing mechanicals, platform and sheet metal of the Outback wagon. Production occurred at the Subaru of Indiana Automotive, Inc. factory in Lafayette, Indiana.

== Specifications ==
=== Chassis types ===
code	BE	BH	BT
Body styles	sedan	extended roof wagon	Baja Truck

=== Engines ===
Models	Years	Type (code)	Power, torque@rpm
B4 (Australia)	2001–2002	1,994 cc (1.994 L; 121.7 cu in) 2.0 L H4 twin turbo (EJ208/206)	258 PS (190 kW; 254 hp) @ 6400, 320 N⋅m (236 lb⋅ft) @ 4800 (manual) 239 PS (176 kW; 236 hp) @ 6000, 309 N⋅m (228 lb⋅ft)@4800 (automatic)
B4 RSK & GT	1998–2003	1,994 cc (1.994 L; 121.7 cu in) 2.0 L H4 twin turbo (EJ208/206)	276 bhp (206 kW) @ 6500, 343 N⋅m (253 lb⋅ft) @ 5000 (manual) 265 bhp (198 kW) @ 6000, 319 N⋅m (235 lb⋅ft) @ 5000 (automatic)
B4 RS & TS-R	2001–2003	2.0 L H4 (EJ20)	157 PS (115 kW; 155 hp) @ 6400, 196 N⋅m (145 lb⋅ft) @ 3200
B4 RS25	2001–2003	2.5 L H4 (EJ25)	172 PS (127 kW; 170 hp) @ 6000, 238 N⋅m (176 lb⋅ft) @ 2800
B4 RS30 & GT30	2002–2003	3.0 L H6 (EZ30)	223 PS (164 kW; 220 hp) @ 6000, 290 N⋅m (214 lb⋅ft) @ 4400
Blitzen 6 wagon	2002–2002	3.0 L H6 (EZ30)	223 PS (164 kW; 220 hp) @ 6000, 290 N⋅m (214 lb⋅ft) @ 4400
Blitzen wagon	2002–2002	1,994 cc (1.994 L; 121.7 cu in) 2.0 L H4 twin turbo (Ej208/206)	276 bhp (206 kW) @ 6500, 343 N⋅m (253 lb⋅ft) @ 5000 (manual) 265 bhp (198 kW) @ 6000, 319 N⋅m (235 lb⋅ft) @ 5000 (automatic)
STi S401 version	2002	2.0 L H4 twin turbo (EJ20)	293 PS (216 kW; 289 hp) @ 6400, 343 N⋅m (253 lb⋅ft) @ 4400–5600

=== Transmissions ===
Models	Years	Type (code)
B4 RSK	2001	5-speed manual, 4-speed automatic
B4 (Australia)	2003	5-speed manual, 4-speed automatic
STi S401 version	2002	6-speed manual

The 4-speed automatic transmission had a feature where the transmission could be instructed to ignore 1st gear from a standing stop to assist driving on traction limited situations, such as ice and snow. The system was activated by moving the gearshift from the "D" position down to "2nd". The car would then start in 2nd gear, and not 1st. The transmission also splits the delivered torque 50-50 between the front and rear wheels. Once the car stopped, the transmission would start back in 2nd and not 1st, until the system was upshifted to 4th.

Japanese models with automatic transmission include a "Power/Econo" button that was previously installed on the gear selector has been relocated to the transmission surround on the right side, due to a redesign of the automatic transmission gear shift handle.

The automatic transmission also has the ability to change the shift points, and hold the gears longer when the engine is operating at a higher RPM. This is achieved by pressing the accelerator pedal rapidly, which causes the transmission to hold the gear until 5000 rpm before shifting to the next gear. No indicator light appears in the instrument cluster, unlike previous generations. The transmission also has engine over-rev protection by shifting the transmission to the next available gear once 6500 rpm has been achieved, even if the gear selector is in a low gear position.

Japanese-spec vehicles with the twin-turbo had a "Sportshift" manumatic transmission, that allowed the driver to push the automatic gearshift selector to the left, and then allow the driver to shift the automatic like a manual transmission. In-dash satellite navigation was offered on Japan-spec vehicles on upper trim level sedans and wagons starting with the 1998 model year and continued to offer a Momo black leather steering wheel, gearshift knob, and parking brake handle.
