= Subaru Baja =

Compact truck by Subaru, 2002 to 2006

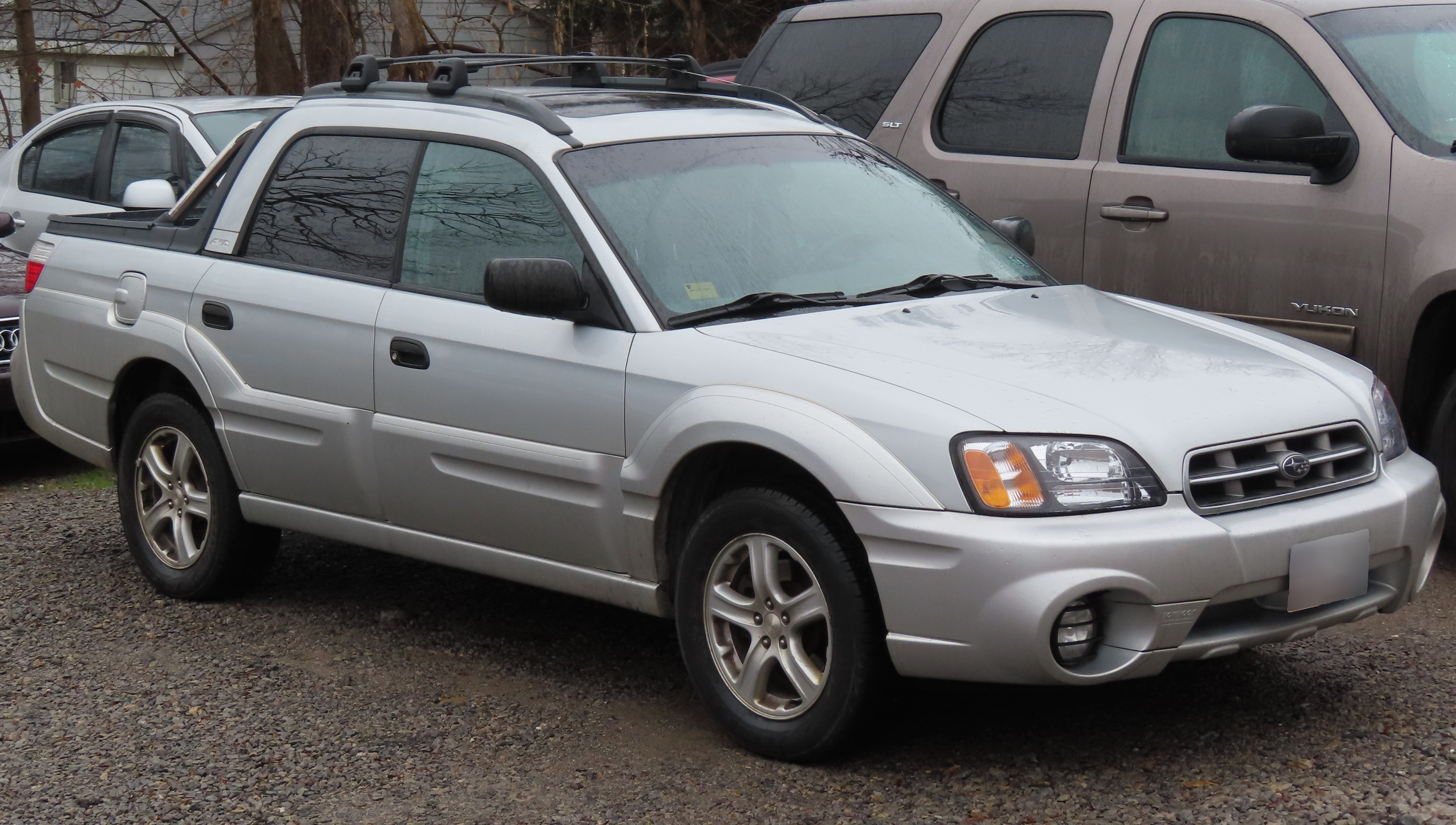
- 2006 Subaru Baja Sport

Overview
- Manufacturer: Subaru-Isuzu Automotive, Inc.
- Production: July 2002 – April 2006
- Model years: 2003–2006
- Assembly: United States: Lafayette, Indiana (Subaru of Indiana Automotive, Inc.)

Body and chassis
- Class: Compact utility/pickup truck
- Body style: 4-door coupé utility
- Layout: Front-engine, all-wheel drive
- Related: Subaru Legacy/Outback

Powertrain
- Engine: 2.5 L EJ251 H4 (2003–2004); 2.5 L EJ253 H4 (2005–2006); 2.5 L EJ255 H4 turbo
- Transmission: 4-speed automatic; 5-speed manual

Dimensions
- Wheelbase: 2,649 mm (104.3 in)
- Length: 4,905 mm (193.1 in)
- Width: 1,781 mm (70.1 in)
- Height: 2003–04: 1,631 mm (64.2 in); 2005–06: 1,654 mm (65.1 in)

Chronology
- Predecessor: Subaru BRAT

The Subaru Baja is an all-wheel-drive, four passenger coupé utility manufactured from 2002 to 2006 by Subaru and marketed for the 2003 to 2006 model years. The Baja combines the handling and passenger carrying characteristics of a traditional passenger car with the open-bed versatility and load capacity of a small pickup truck.

The unibody design borrowed heavily from the existing mechanicals, platform and sheet metal of the Subaru Legacy/Outback wagon. Production began on July 18, 2002 as a 2003 model at the Subaru of Indiana Automotive, Inc. factory in Lafayette, Indiana.

The name Baja derives from the Mexican peninsula of Baja California; home to the Baja 1000 off-road race.

== Design and engineering ==
Working with technical support from Subaru Japan, a team led by Peter Tenn, Subaru senior designer, penned the Baja in the United States. According to an August 2002 interview with Tenn, "the Baja's jarring look is homage to rally-race trucks. It's supposed to look funky, look different. It doesn't fit any category, and we knew that going in. It's not like anything else on the road. And that's important to a lot of people."

The Baja followed closely Subaru's ST-X (Sport Truck X-perimental) concept vehicle presented at the 2000 Los Angeles International Auto Show and also designed by a special Subaru America design team. The ST-X offered a greater complement of features than the production Baja (power rear window, under floor storage compartment, tailgate cup holders), but nevertheless set the production groundwork for an Outback-based, four-door, car-truck hybrid.

In a package 150 mm (6 in) longer than an Outback, the Baja featured a four-seater passenger compartment along with a 1,050 mm (41.5 in) open bed and drop-down tailgate. A system marketed as the Switchback allowed the rear passenger seat to fold down and a small hatch from the open bed to fold inward, allowing an extended length of around 2.3 m (7.5 ft) to the end of the open tailgate. A light in the instrument cluster signaled an "open" status for the Switchback. An optional bed extender was also offered to extend the bed's load length to the end of the open tailgate. The Baja's overall design featured two stainless steel exposed buttresses behind the passenger compartment, marketed as Sports Bars, providing structural reinforcement for the bodywork.

Features included tinted rear door windows and rear window; an integrated bed liner; a dual-illumination bed light; four bed tie-down hooks; molded-in recesses to receive standard 2x4's to enable customized (e.g., bi-level) storage; standard roof rails with cross bars; a tow rating of 1,100 kg (2,400 lb), a rear seat center position rigid hinged storage compartment with integral twin cupholders, rear-seat power supply, rear-seat center storage net, map-pockets at rear of each front seat; an under-bed mounted spare tire, operable via a cable winch accessible from an access panel in the bed, and a fold-down license plate holder allowing the plate to be visible with the tailgate down.

== Marketing and sales ==
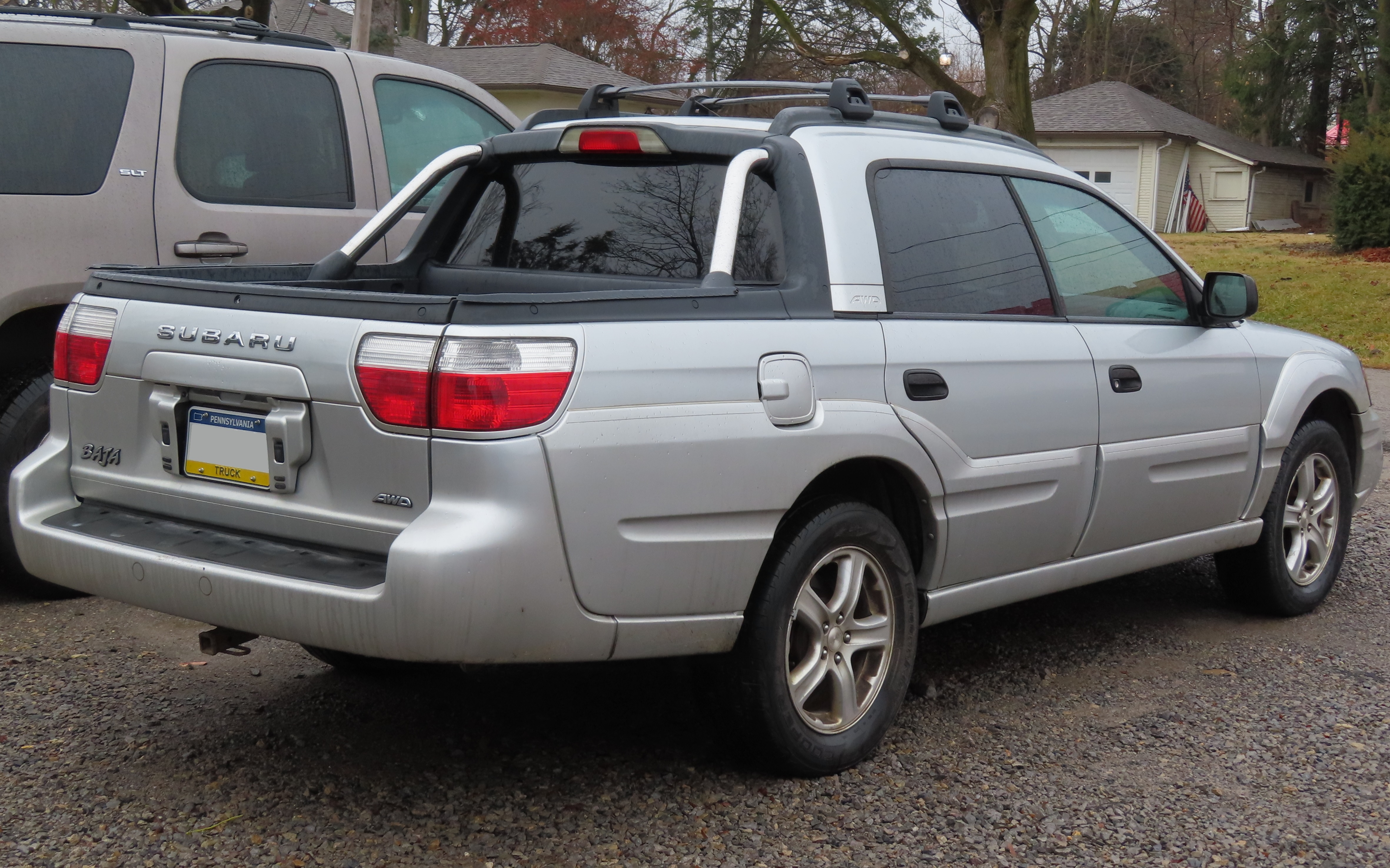
Rear view

Subaru marketed the Baja in the United States, Canada and Chile. In the United States and Canada, Subaru marketed the Baja as a "multiple-choice vehicle." Limited advertising, late arrival of the turbo-charged model, heavily styled lower-body plastic cladding and a yellow-and-silver introductory color scheme discouraged broad appeal. At the time of the Baja's introduction, USA Today called it a "controversial fashion statement with limited utility".

The Baja received the 2003 and 2004 J.D. Powers's APEAL (for Automotive Performance, Execution and Layout Study) Award—measuring owner satisfaction with the design, content, layout and performance of their new vehicles for "Most Appealing Compact Pickup" and the Consumer Reports 2006 highest score for reliability in the pickup truck category.

With Subaru projecting 24,000 sales annually, 30,000 were marketed over four and a half years.

Subaru discontinued Baja production in April 2006. Subaru stock-piled an inventory of 2006 models before discontinuing production, allowing dealers to continue to sell 2006 models as late as February 2008. The Baja was removed from the Subaru USA website on July 31, 2007, following its removal from the Subaru Chile website in April 2007.

In 2007, Subaru of America reached agreement with Toyota Motor Corporation allowing Subaru Indiana to manufacture Camrys to meet Toyota's excess demand using surplus manufacturing capacity from its former Baja production line.

== Model year changes ==
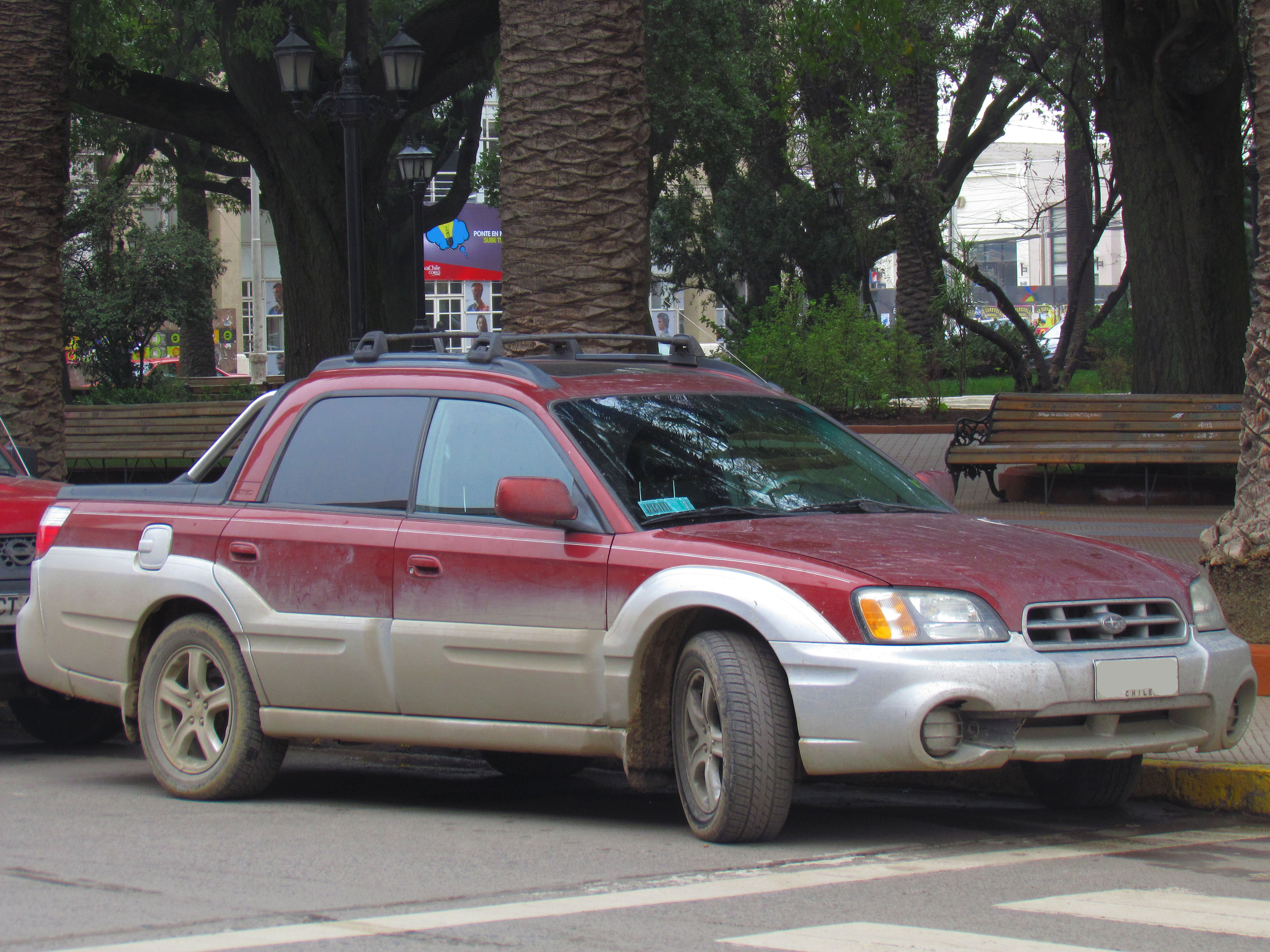
2003 Subaru Baja

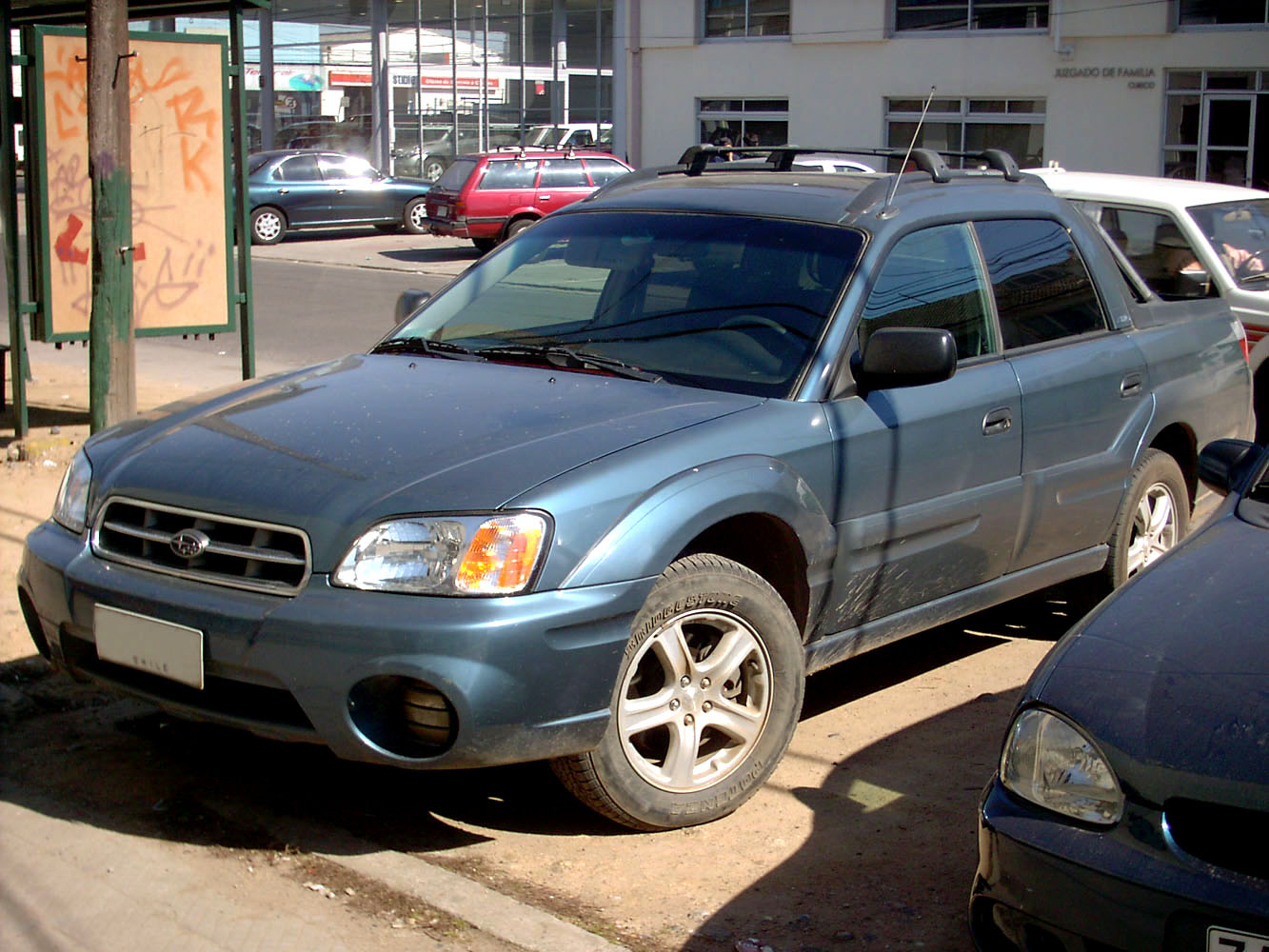
2005 Subaru Baja

- 2003: the launch model featured leather seats, power driver's seat, and sunroof. A lower priced "Sport" model, equipped with cloth interior and manually-adjustable seats followed later in the production year, also without color-keyed exterior door handles and mirrors, four-beam headlamps, leather shift and steering wheel, front door puddle lights or an illuminated ignition key ring.
- 2004: introduced a new 2.5-liter turbocharged model producing 160 kW (210 hp). This model featured Sportshift (a sport-mode automatic transmission), large hood scoop and color-matched exterior door handles and side mirrors. All models received increased ground clearance to 210 mm (8.4 in).
- 2005: all models were given a further increase in ride height, a power outlet in the center console, rear seat back net pocket, and turbocharged models with leather offered a new tonneau bed cover.
- 2006: the turbocharged variant received an optional package that included leather trimmed upholstery, heated seats, special alloy wheels, a hard bed cover, and the sport-mode automatic transmission. All models received an enhanced security system.

== See also ==
- Subaru BRAT
