= Subaru Stella =

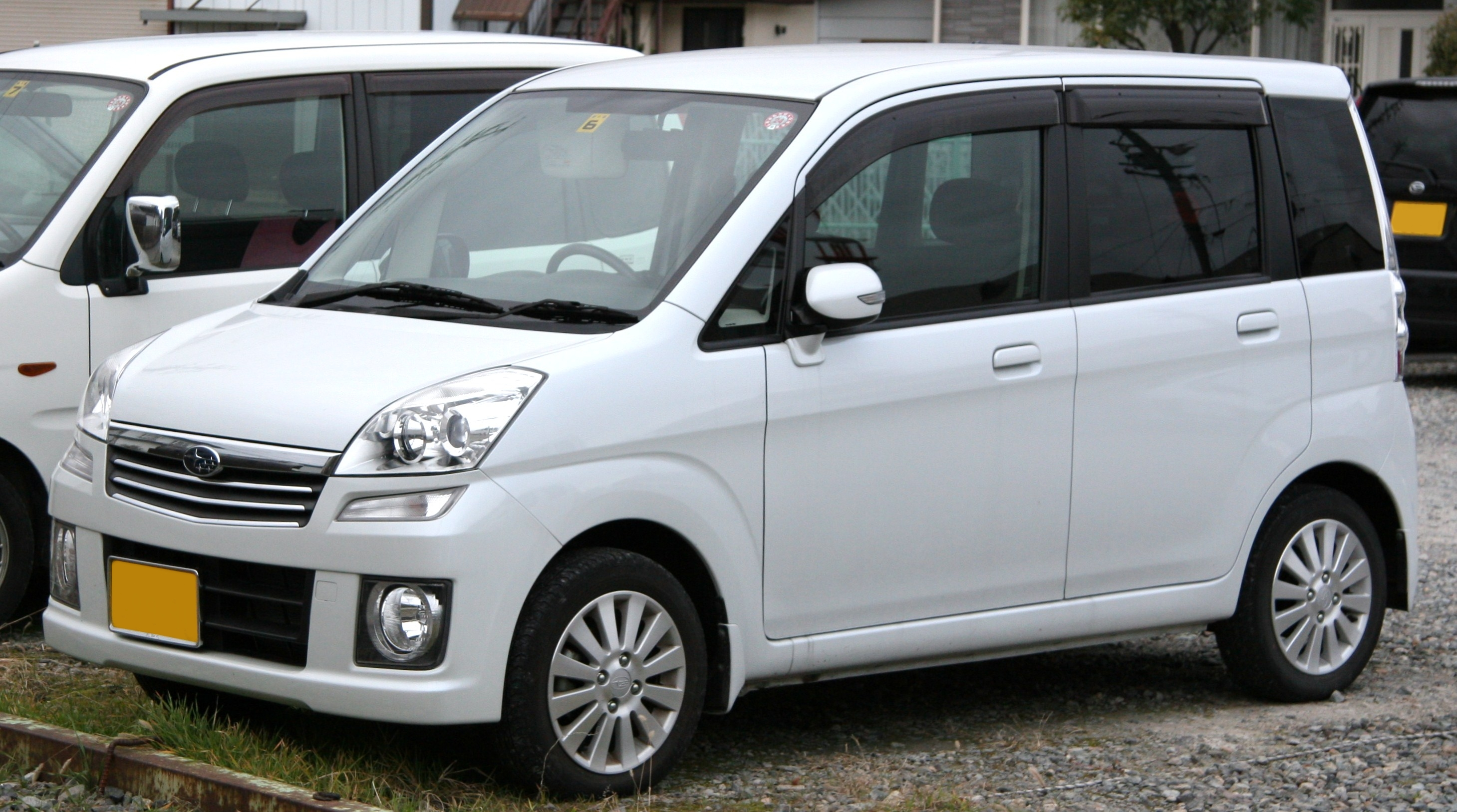

Overview
- Manufacturer: Subaru (2006–2011); Daihatsu (2011–2023, 2025–present)
- Also called: Daihatsu Move (2011–present)
- Production: 2006–2023; 2025–present

Body and chassis
- Class: Kei car
- Body style: 5-door hatchback (2006–2023); 5-door microvan (2025–present)
- Layout: Front-engine, front-wheel-drive or all-wheel-drive
- Related: Subaru R2

Powertrain
- Engine: 658 cc EN07D DOHC AVCS I4; 658 cc EN07X supercharged DOHC I4; 40 kW electric motor
- Transmission: 5-speed manual iCVT

Dimensions
- Wheelbase: 2,360 mm (92.9 in)
- Length: 3,395 mm (133.7 in)
- Width: 1,475 mm (58.1 in)
- Height: 1,645 mm (64.8 in)
- Curb weight: 930 kg (2,050.3 lb)

Chronology
- Predecessor: Subaru Pleo (first generation)

The Subaru Stella (Japanese: スバル・ステラ, Hepburn: Subaru Sutera) is a 5-door kei car sold by Subaru starting in June 2006, currently in its fourth generation. The first generation Stella was based on the same architecture as the Subaru R2 and could be considered the direct replacement of the Subaru Pleo, although the Pleo soldiered on for another four years. It was Subaru's re-entry into the market segment dominated by the Suzuki Wagon R and the Daihatsu Move, hoping to recapture market share after the R2's lower-than-expected sales. The Stella's dimensions are more parking structure-friendly where vehicle stacking is utilized over the Pleo. The second through fourth generations of the Stella have been rebadged Daihatsu Moves, as Subaru has stopped manufacturing kei cars.

The name Stella is Italian for "star", a reference to Subaru being the Japanese name for the Pleiades star cluster. While the Revesta grade, is a coined word combining Vesta, the brightest asteroid, with the prefix "re," meaning repetition.

== Overview ==
The first generation Stella was launched in June 2006. The lineup initially launched in 2006 consisted of two lines: standard models (L and LX) and custom models (R and RS). However, in 2008, there were three lines: standard models (L and LS), Custom models (R, R Limited, and RS), and Revesta models (Revesta and S). Production was handled by the Gunma Plant.

The Custom models features an aerodynamic design, 14-inch aluminium wheels, an intercooled supercharged engine. The Custom RS is powered with a straight-four DOHC 16-valve supercharged engine that produces a maximum output of 64 PS (47 kW; 63 hp) and a maximum and all are paired with an i-CVT.

The LS, Custom RS, and Libesta S models, which offer improved performance, are equipped with an intercooled supercharger and a front stabilizer. The Custom RS and Libesta S models, which have an even stronger sporty character, come standard with an i-CVT transmission program with a "Sport Mode" that improves acceleration performance, and feature a three-gauge electroluminescent meter.

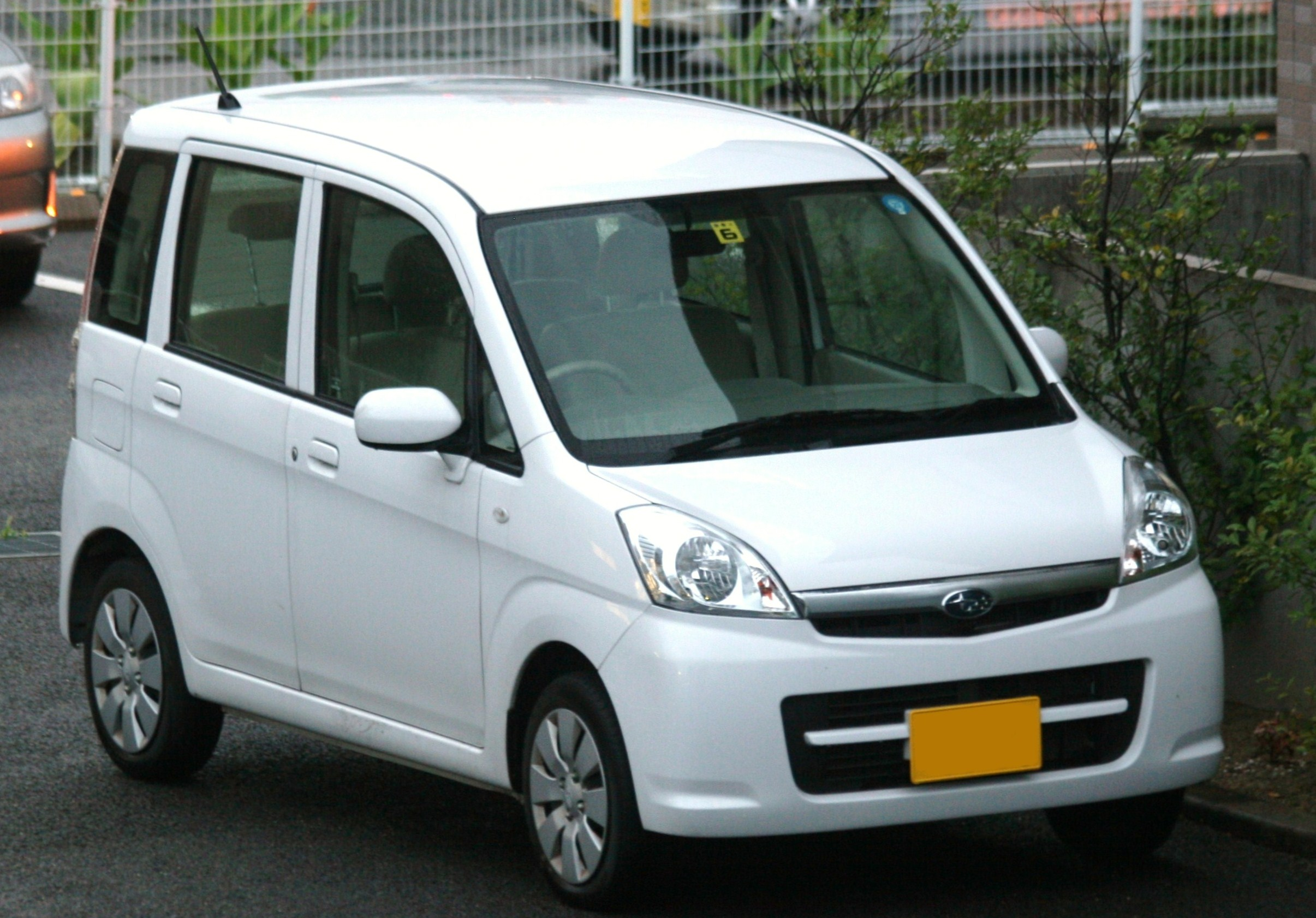
Subaru Stella

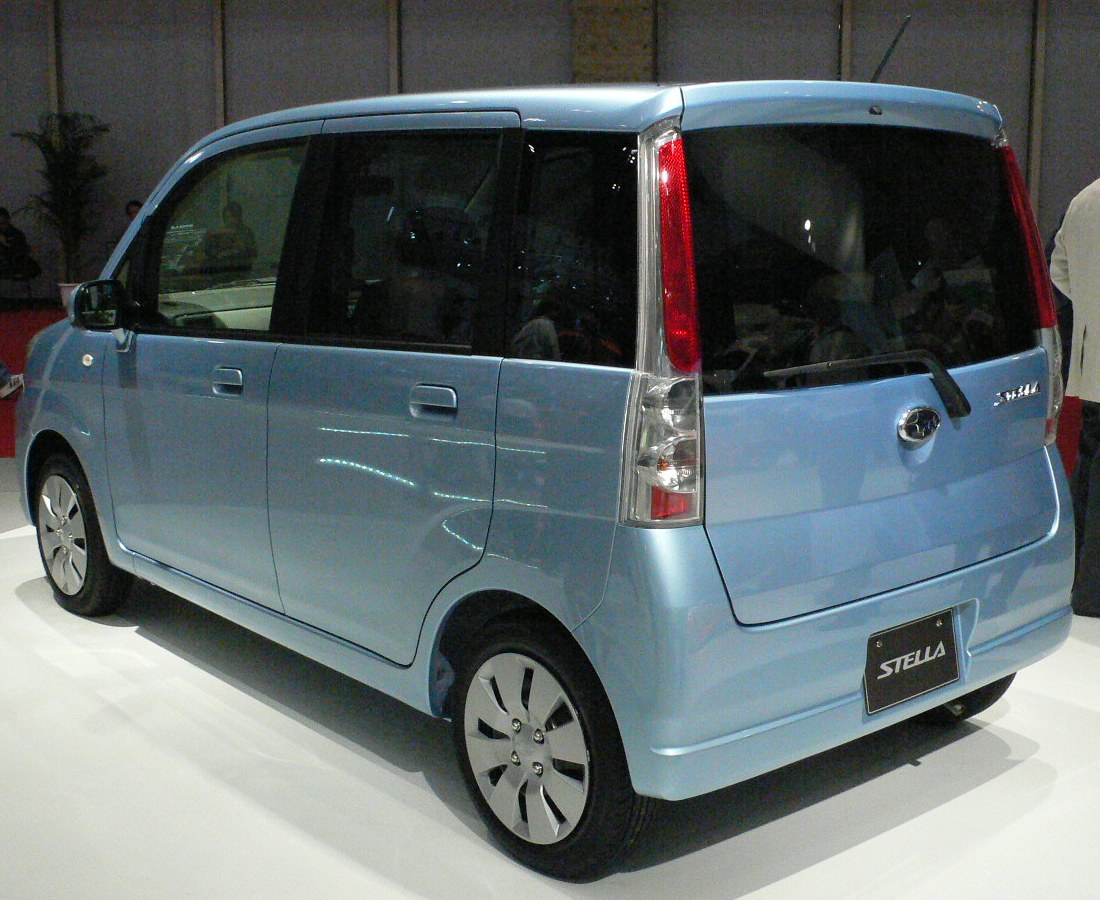
Rear view

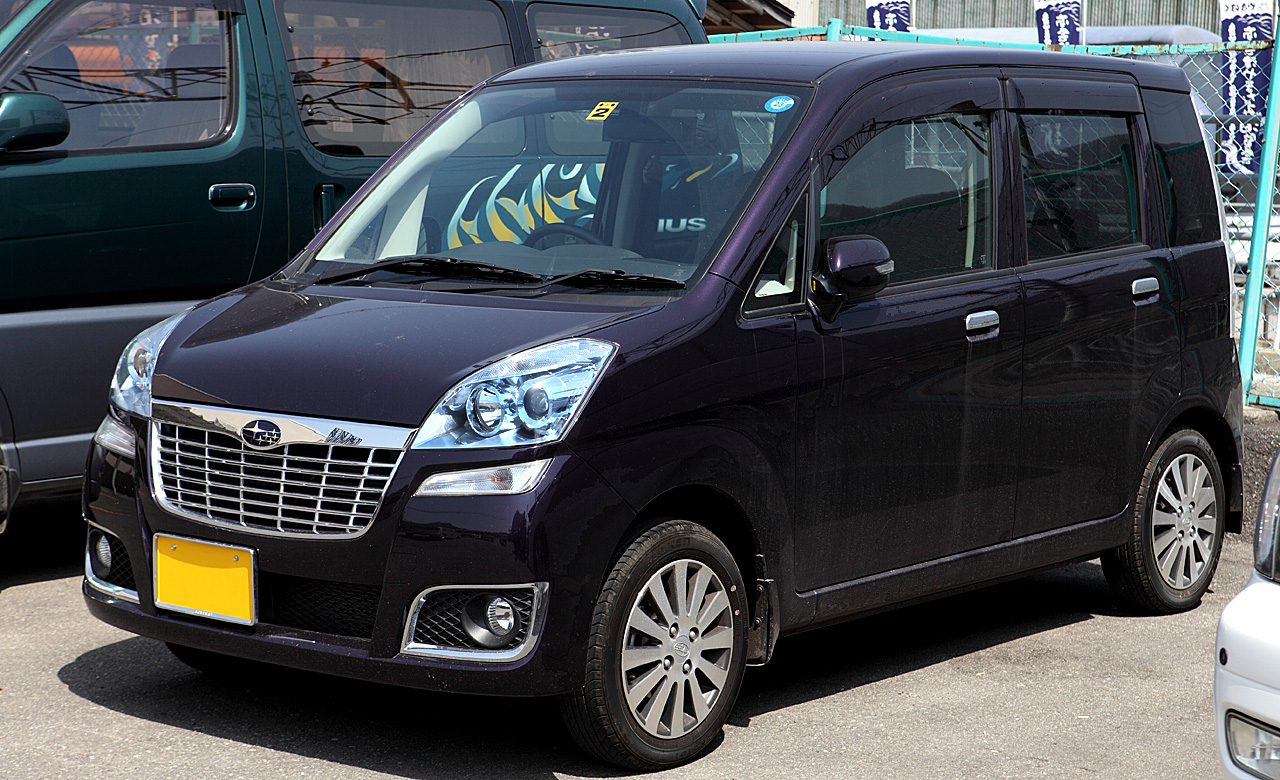
Subaru Stella Revesta

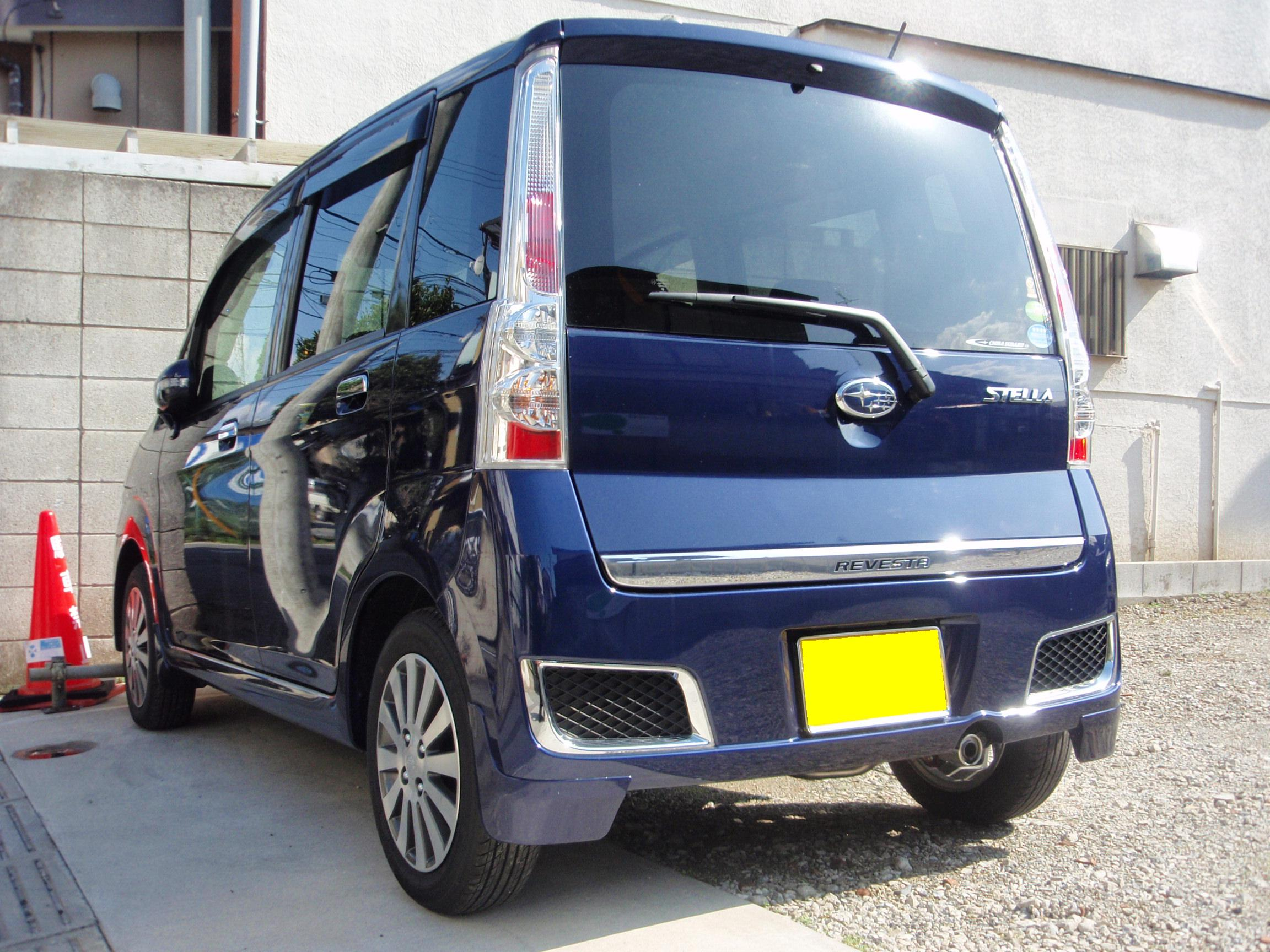
Subaru Stella Revesta rear view

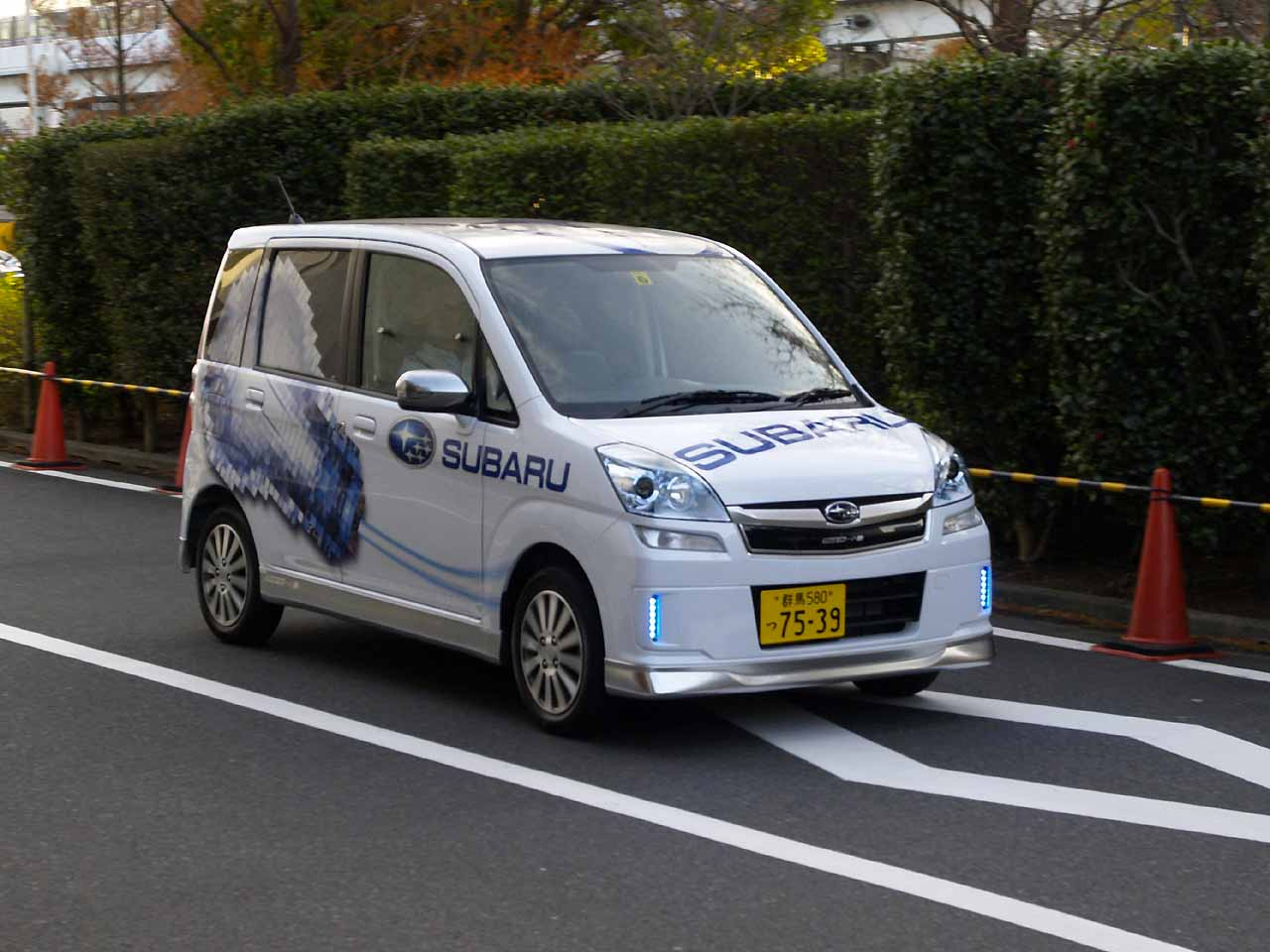
Subaru Plug-in Stella Concept

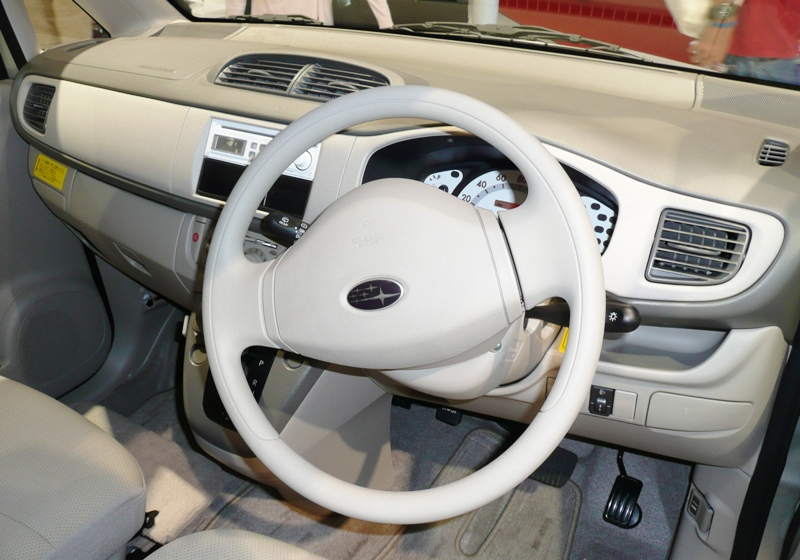
Interior

== Electric version ==
In June 2008, Subaru unveiled a concept version on an electric vehicle by combining the Stella platform with the electric drive from the Subaru R1e, which uses TEPCO lithium-ion batteries.

It was showcased at the G8 Summit on 7 July 2008. Fuji announced in June 2009 that it planned to sell 170 units through March 2010, primarily to fleet and government users in Japan, with deliveries beginning in late July.

It was also intended to be sold in the European Union starting September 2010, but never was.

== Continued use of the nameplate ==
Due to the 2008 investment of Toyota, the Stella was replaced by a rebadged Daihatsu (a Toyota subsidiary). Subaru immediately started selling one rebadged Toyota, the Subaru Dex, but kept making the Stella and some other kei products for a few years longer than initially planned. The second-generation Stella (model code LA100) was introduced in Japan on 11 May 2011 and is a rebadged Daihatsu Move.

The third generation Stella (LA150/160) was introduced in December 2014. It was discontinued at the end of June 2023, although sales from stock were set to continue into early 2024. Originally, the Stella was scheduled to be replaced by the succeeding (seventh) generation of the Daihatsu Move, but after the scandal involving rigged safety tests at Daihatsu the Stella was withdrawn from the market along with several other Daihatsu models.

The fourth generation model (LA850) was later introduced in June 2025.

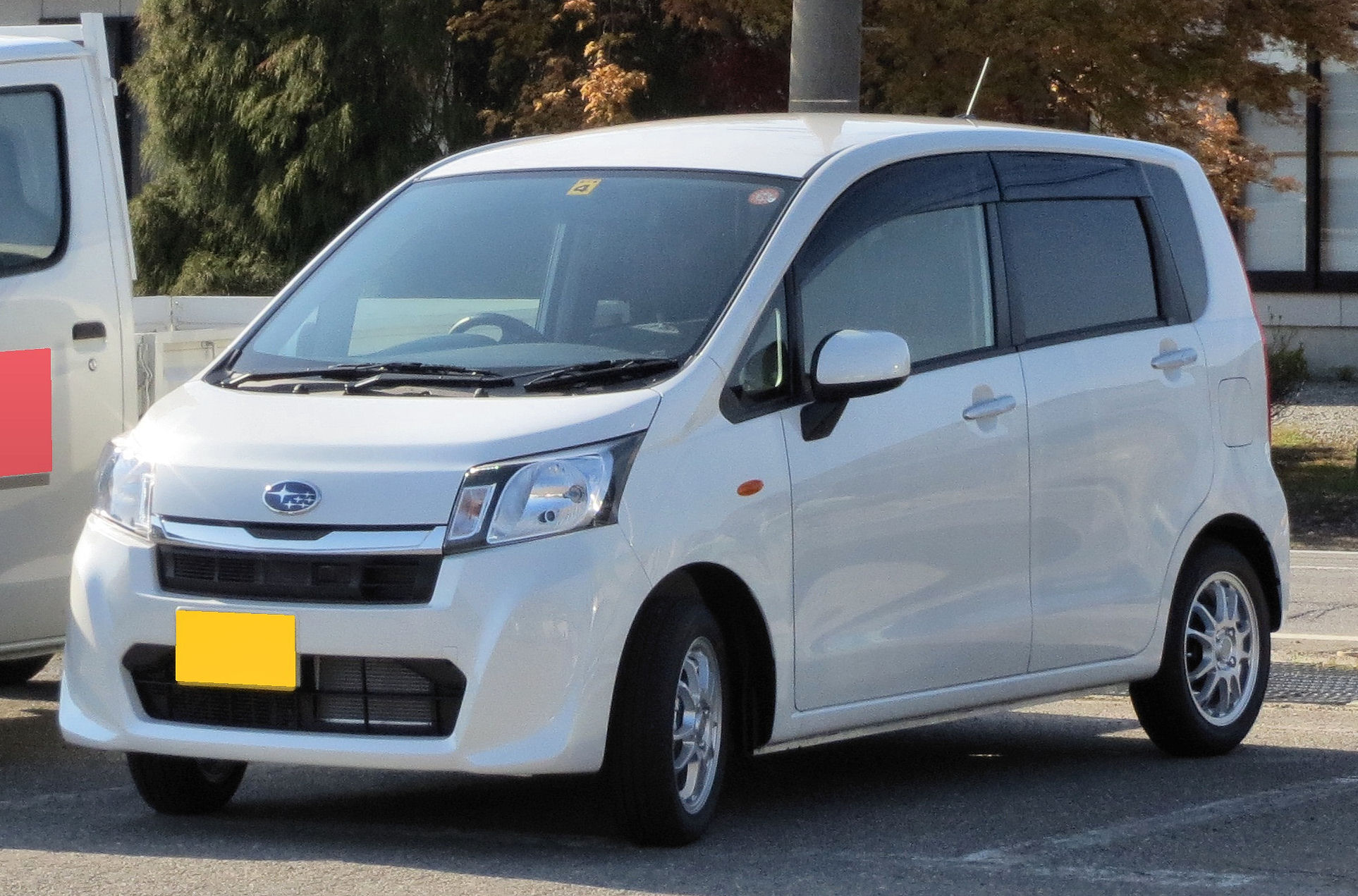
Stella (second generation)

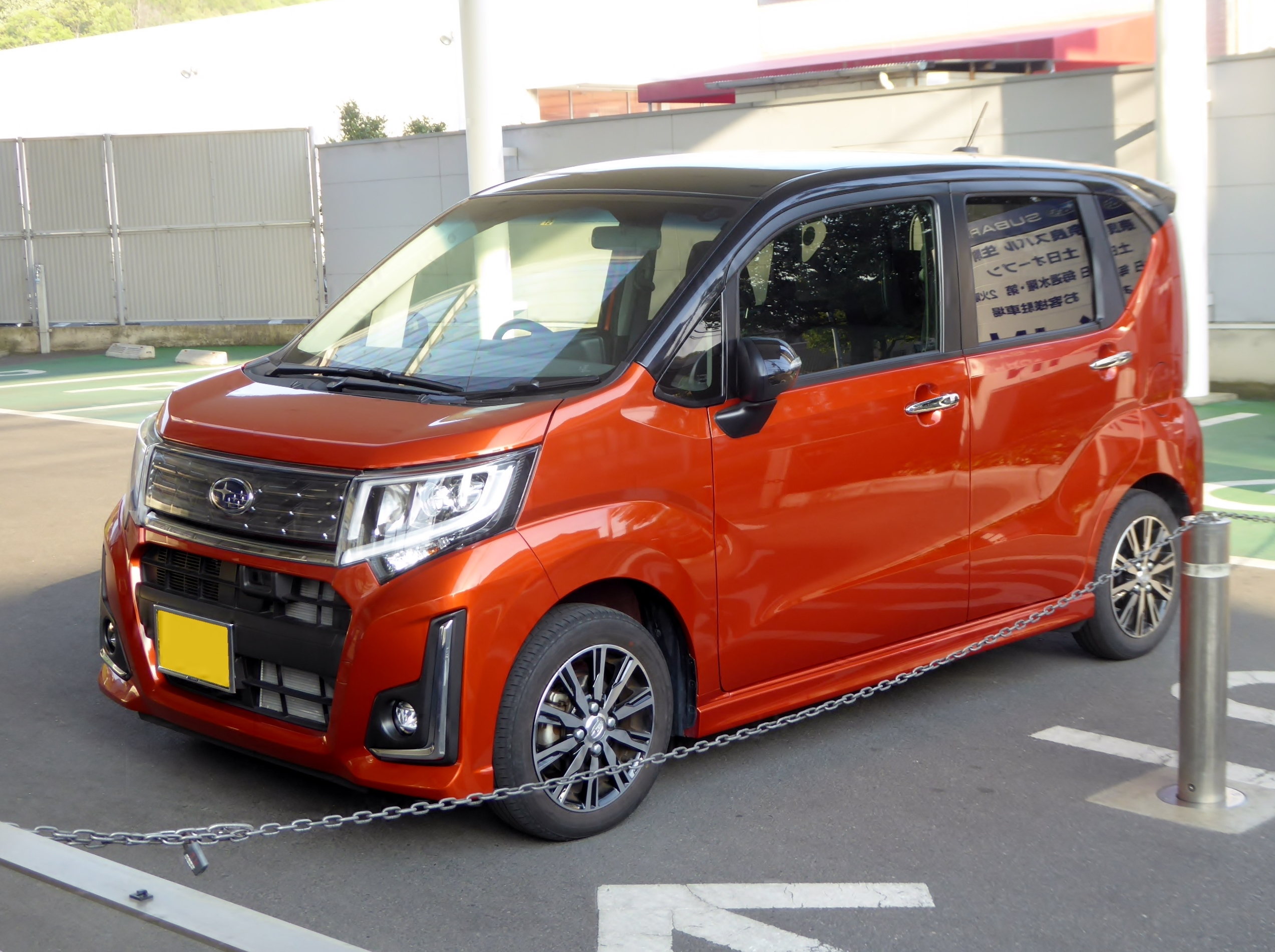
Stella (third generation)

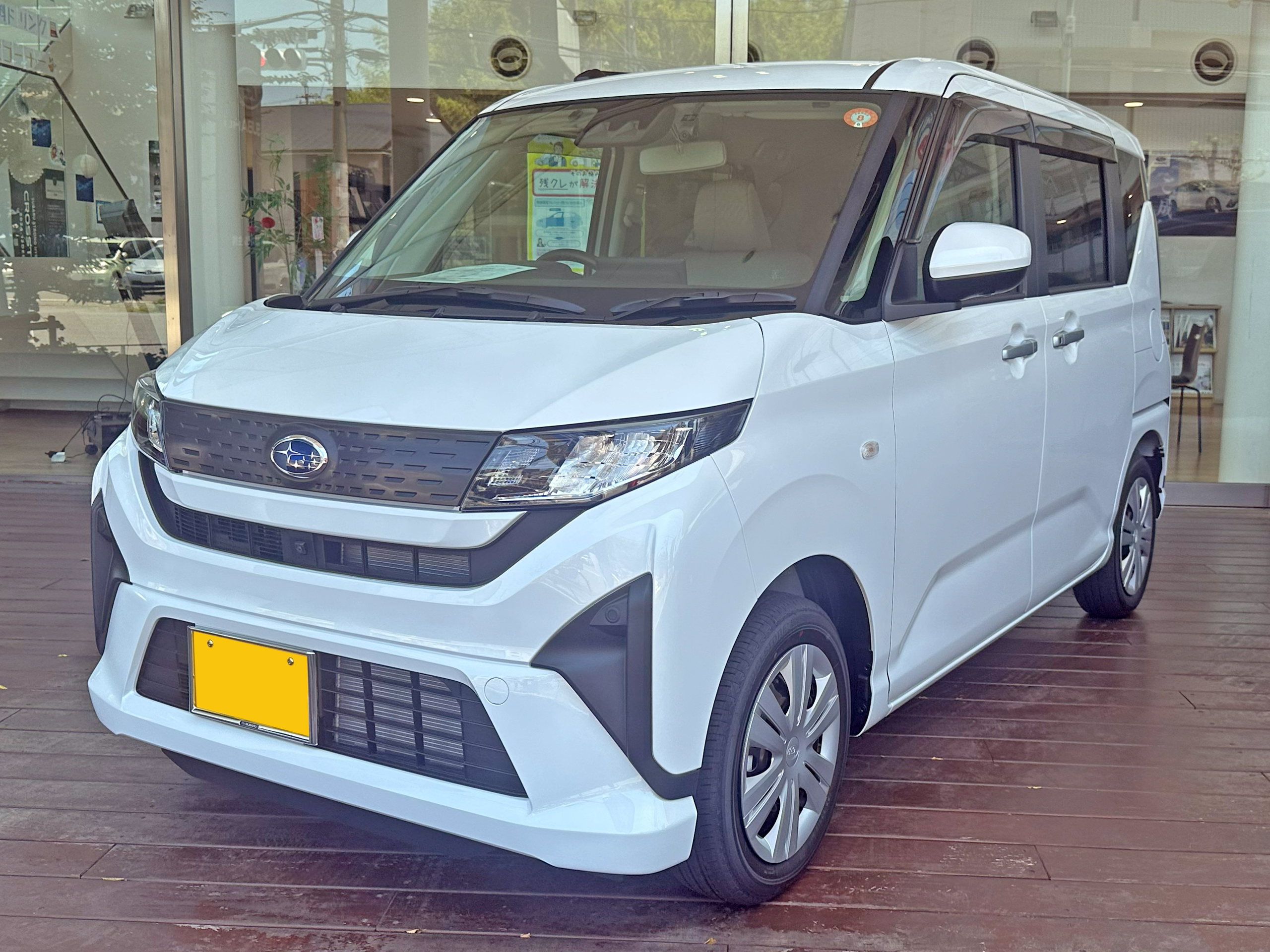
Stella (fourth generation)

== Sales ==
Year	Japan
2006	36,295
2007	49,958
2008	44,836
2009	33,680
2010	29,333
2011	23,205
2012	21,821
2013	23,439
2014	14,927
2015	15,841
2016	11,742
2017	7,037
2018	6,560
2019	5,416
2020	4,149
2021	3,097
2022	3,475
2023	1,700
