= Subaru R-2 =

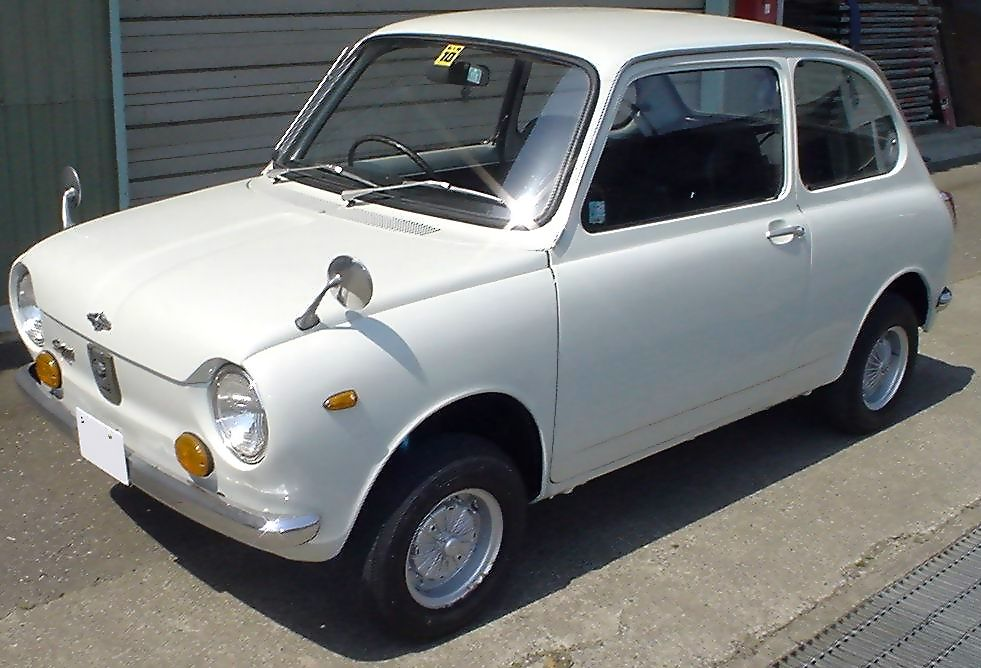
- 1970 Subaru R-2 (early air-cooled engine)

Overview
- Manufacturer: Subaru
- Production: 1969–1972
- Assembly: Subaru-chō Plant, Ōta, Gunma, Japan

Body and chassis
- Class: City car/Kei car
- Body style: 2-door sedan; 3-door van
- Layout: Rear engine, Rear wheel drive

Powertrain
- Engine: 356 cc EK33 air-cooled I2; 358 cc EK34 water-cooled I2

Dimensions
- Wheelbase: 1,920 mm (76 in)
- Length: 2,995 mm (117.9 in)
- Width: 1,295 mm (51.0 in)
- Height: 1,345 mm (53.0 in)
- Curb weight: 430 kg (950 lb)

Chronology
- Predecessor: Subaru 360
- Successor: Subaru Rex

The Subaru R-2 is a kei car manufactured by Subaru from 1969 to 1972. The R-2 was a full model change of the popular Subaru 360, but with an updated appearance and increased interior space. The R-2 appeared approximately one year before the Honda Life, Daihatsu Fellow Max and Suzuki Fronte kei cars, however, it continued to use the powertrain setup from the Subaru 360, which was the EK33 air-cooled 2-cylinder engine installed in the back, which is the inspiration for the name of the vehicle. It appeared around the same time as the second generation Mitsubishi Minica.

== History ==
When the car was introduced February 8, 1969, Subaru took 25,000 orders for the car in one month. Sales began in August of that year.

In the early 1970s, the Japanese government enacted legislation to reduce emissions, which prompted Subaru and other manufacturers to upgrade engines that were air-cooled and using a two-stroke engine implementation, shared with the Subaru Sambar. On October 7, 1971, the Subaru engine was upgraded to a two-stroke water-cooled engine, called the EK34 series engine, but the retrofit was hastily done, and was better achieved with the new 1972 Subaru Rex, which was available with both 2- and 4-doors. A styling upgrade was accomplished on the water-cooled R-2, adding a faux grille to the front of the vehicle that had no function other than a more modern appearance, as well as a corporate identity to the all new compact Subaru Leone.

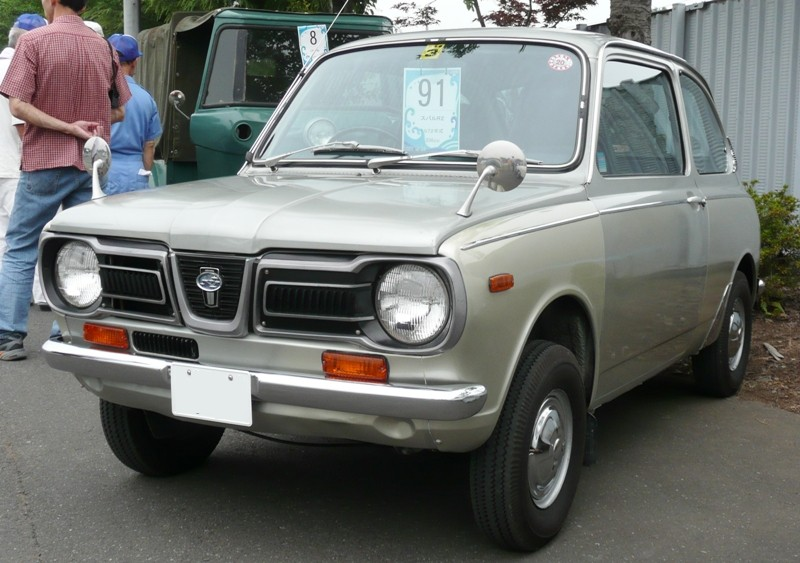
1972 Subaru R-2 (late version with water-cooled engine)

Subaru continued with a rear engine platform so as to afford more trunk space up front and provide seating for four passengers, whereas competitors offered front engine front wheel drive vehicles to reduce noise intrusion from the engine and offer rear seats that folded down for increased cargo capacity, albeit with fewer passengers. In response to the rising popularity of front wheel drive front engine alternatives, Subaru offered a utilitarian hatchback bodystyle (marketed as a Van) from 16 February 1970. Instead of the 31 PS (23 kW) of the sedan, the lower tuned Van has 26 PS (19 kW). The sedan carries the K12 model code, with the Van being the K41.

Performance versions of the R-2 came April 18, 1970, in the form of the R-2 SS with a dual exhaust and an increase in the compression ratio from 3.8 kg⋅m (37 N⋅m; 27 lb⋅ft) at 6400 rpm to 7.5 kg⋅m (74 N⋅m; 54 lb⋅ft) at 7000 rpm, and a higher trim level called the R-2 GL arrived on 5 October. Another contributor to the early cancellation of the R-2 was its handling characteristics, which were found to be not as stable as vehicles that were front engine, front wheel drive.

Subaru would launch a spiritual successor to the R-2 in 2003, called the Subaru R2.

== Cultural references ==
The Subaru R-2 was driven by Natsumi Tsujimoto, a fictional anime character and one of the main protagonists in the You're Under Arrest franchise.

This particular car model is also being prominently used by the character Toshio in the Ghibli studio's animated adaptation of the manga "Only Yesterday".
