= Subaru EN engine =

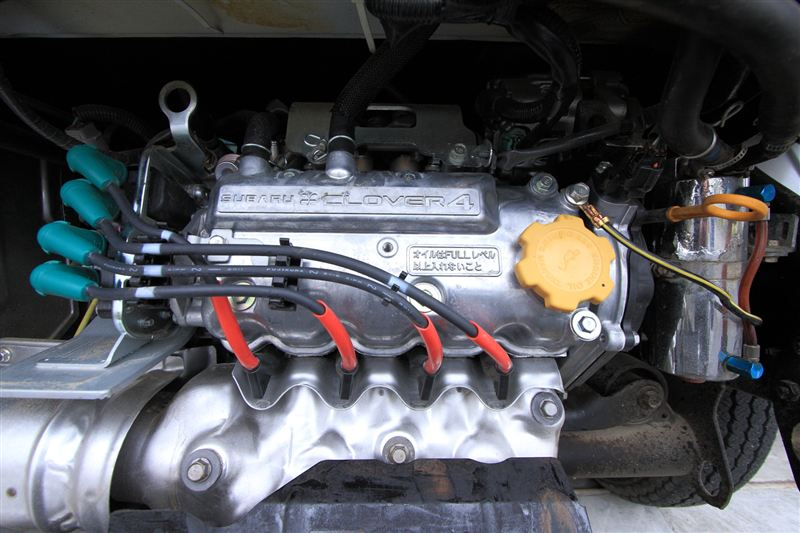

Overview
- Manufacturer: Subaru
- Also called: Clover 4 engine
- Production: 1989–2012

Layout
- Configuration: inline-four petrol engine
- Displacement: 547 cc (33.4 cu in); 658 cc (40.2 cu in); 758 cc (46.3 cu in)
- Cylinder bore: 56 mm (2.20 in)
- Piston stroke: 55.6 mm (2.19 in); 66.8 mm (2.63 in); 77.0 mm (3.03 in)
- Valvetrain: SOHC, 2 valves/cyl.; DOHC, 4 valves/cyl.

Combustion
- Fuel system: Carburettor; Fuel injection
- Fuel type: Petrol
- Cooling system: Water-cooled

Chronology
- Successor: Daihatsu KF engine

The EN series engine is a four-cylinder, four-stroke engine used in kei cars sold by Subaru in Japan, succeeding the EK family of two-cylinder engines previously used in Subaru kei cars from 1958 to 1989. The EN family was introduced in 1989 (as the EN05) and discontinued in 2012.

== Overview ==
It was a replacement for the two-cylinder EK23 that was used in the Subaru Rex. While other manufacturers adopted a three-cylinder engine, the Subaru EN is a four-cylinder of only 547 cc. Subaru also did make a three-cylinder engine, called the Subaru EF engine which was used in the Subaru Justy, but the larger EF engine (which was based on the smaller EK23) was not modernized at the same time.

The following year, 1989, the Japanese Ministry of Transport revised the standards for kei cars. This resulted in the new 660 cc class series of four-cylinder engines, and the EN05 had its stroke increased to produce the EN07. The bore pitch remained 62.5 mm (2.46 in) to help keep the changes to a minimum. The increased stroke helped make up for the lack of low-speed torque, a weakness of the other four-cylinder 660 cc engines. While four-cylinder engines are not typical in kei class cars, Subaru kept using this layout until they stopped manufacturing their own kei vehicles in 2012. Three-cylinder engines have proved to be on par with Subaru's four-cylinder designs; while not as smooth running they tend to be lighter and more economical due to lower friction losses. Nonetheless, the EN07 powered three of the five most fuel efficient kei passenger cars in 2009 (heading the list for the third year in a row), when the EN engine was its peak of development.

There was a turbocharged version of the predecessor, the EK23, used in the Subaru Rex, which competed with the Daihatsu Mira and Suzuki Alto. This was replaced with a supercharger for the EN-series. The four-cylinder EN engine was originally marketed as the Clover 4, and Subaru cast the head with a clover-leaf mark, to set it apart from its three-cylinder version. Subaru remained faithful to the EN-series until they stopped building kei car engines. Subaru uses Daihatsu three-cylinder units for the Sambar truck (now a rebadged Daihatsu Hijet) since 28 February 2012.

== EN05 ==
The EN05 was the first engine in the EN series, introduced in mid-1989. Variants include a naturally aspirated model with a carburetor, and the EMPi equipped with a supercharger. Cylinder dimensions are slightly oversquare.

Common to all EN05 variants:

- SOHC 8-valve
- Displacement: 547 cc (33.4 cu in)
- Bore × stroke: 56.0 mm × 55.6 mm (2.20 in × 2.19 in)

=== EN05A (naturally aspirated carburetor) ===
- Compression ratio: 10.0
- Output: 38 PS (28 kW) at 7500 rpm, 4.5 kg⋅m (44 N⋅m; 33 lb⋅ft) at 4500 rpm (1989 Subaru Rex)

=== EN05Z (supercharged) ===
- Compression ratio: 8.5
- Output: 61 PS (45 kW) at 6400 rpm, 7.6 kg⋅m (75 N⋅m; 55 lb⋅ft) at 4400 rpm (1989 Subaru Rex)

== EN07 ==
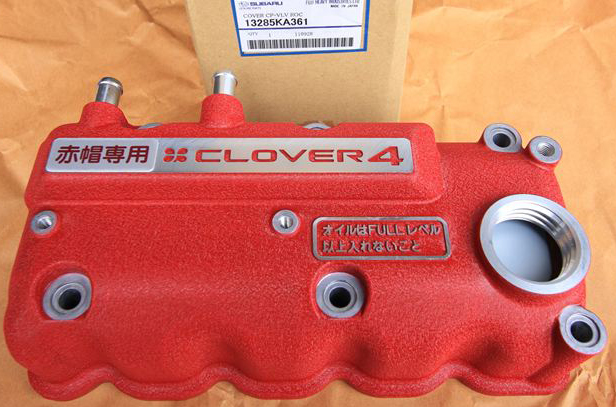
Some versions of the EN07 engine intended for commercial use received upgraded internals and a crimson rocker cover such as this, for an EN07Y.

The EN05 had its stroke lengthened to reach the new 660 cc limit set for kei cars by the Japanese government for March 1990, making it a decidedly long-stroke unit.

Common to all EN07 variants:

- Displacement: 658 cc (40.2 cu in)
- Bore × stroke: 56.0 mm × 66.8 mm (2.20 in × 2.63 in)

EN07 variants
| Type | Valves/cyl | Valvetrain | Fuel delivery | Compression Ratio | Power | Torque |
|---|---|---|---|---|---|---|
| EN07A | 2 | SOHC | Carburetor | 10.0:1 | 42 PS; 31 kW; 41 hp @ 7000 RPM | 52 N⋅m; 5.3 kg⋅m; 38.4 lb⋅ft @ 4500 RPM |
| EN07C | 2 | SOHC | Carburetor | 9.8:1 | 40 PS; 29 kW; 39 hp @ 6500 RPM | 54 N⋅m; 5.5 kg⋅m; 39.8 lb⋅ft @ 3500 RPM |
| EN07L | 2 | SOHC | Carburetor (LPG) | 9.8:1 | ? | ? |
| EN07E | 2 | SOHC | EMPi | 10.0:1 | 53 PS; 39 kW; 52 hp @ 7200 RPM | 54 N⋅m; 5.5 kg⋅m; 39.8 lb⋅ft @ 5600 RPM |
| EN07F | 2 | SOHC | EMPi | 9.8:1 | 48 PS; 35 kW; 47 hp @ 6400 RPM | 57 N⋅m; 5.8 kg⋅m; 42.0 lb⋅ft @ 3200 RPM |
| EN07S | 2 | SOHC | SPI | 10.0:1 | 45 PS; 33 kW; 44 hp @ 6400 RPM | 56 N⋅m; 5.7 kg⋅m; 41.3 lb⋅ft @ 4000 RPM |
| EN07V | 2 | SOHC | SPI | 10.1:1 | 46 PS; 34 kW; 45 hp @ 6400 RPM | 58 N⋅m; 5.9 kg⋅m; 42.8 lb⋅ft @ 4000 RPM |
| EN07Y | 2 | SOHC | Supercharged EMPi | 8.3:1 | 55–58 PS; 40–43 kW; 54–57 hp @ 6200/6000 RPM | 70–74 N⋅m; 7.1–7.5 kg⋅m; 51.6–54.6 lb⋅ft @ 3800/4400 RPM |
| EN07W | 2 | SOHC | Supercharged SPI | 8.9:1 | 58 PS; 43 kW; 57 hp @ 6400 RPM | 72 N⋅m; 7.3 kg⋅m; 53.1 lb⋅ft @ 4000 RPM |
| EN07U | 2 | SOHC | Supercharged, intercooled EMPi | 8.9:1 | 60 PS; 44 kW; 59 hp @ 6400 RPM | 75 N⋅m; 7.6 kg⋅m; 55.3 lb⋅ft @ 4000 RPM |
| EN07Z | 2 | SOHC | Supercharged, intercooled EMPi | 8.5:1 | 64 PS; 47 kW; 63 hp @ 6400/6000 RPM | 84–89 N⋅m; 8.6–9.1 kg⋅m; 62.0–65.6 lb⋅ft @ 4400/3600 RPM |
| EN07D | 4 | DOHC with AVCS | Fuel injection | 10.5:1 | 54 PS; 40 kW; 53 hp @ 6400 RPM | 63 N⋅m; 6.4 kg⋅m; 46.5 lb⋅ft @ 4400 RPM |
| EN07X | 4 | DOHC | Supercharged and intercooled | 9.0:1 | 64 PS; 47 kW; 63 hp @ 7200/6000 RPM | 102–106 N⋅m; 10.4–10.8 kg⋅m; 75.2–78.2 lb⋅ft @ 3600/3200 RPM |

=== EN07A (Naturally Aspirated carburetor) ===
Installed in the Vivio Van.

- SOHC 8-valve
- Compression ratio: 10.0
- Specification Reference: 42 PS (31 kW) at 7000 rpm, 5.3 kg⋅m (52 N⋅m) at 4500 rpm (KW series Subaru Vivio)

=== EN07C (Naturally Aspirated carburetor) ===
The engine was installed in the early Sambar van and truck. Compression ratio dropped slightly, and tuning emphasized low-rpm torque.

- SOHC 8-valve
- Compression ratio: 9.8
- Specification Reference: 40 PS (29 kW) at 6500 rpm, 5.5 kg⋅m (54 N⋅m) at 3500 rpm (KV3 series Sambar)

=== EN07L (LPG carburetor version) ===
- SOHC 8-valve
- Compression ratio: 9.8

Used in:

- Subaru Sambar
- Subaru Sambar Dias

=== EN07E (Naturally Aspirated EMPi) ===
The EN07A engine (with a carburetor) became EN07E with EMPi.

- SOHC 8-valve
- Compression ratio: 10.0
- Specification Reference: 53 PS (39 kW) at 7200 rpm, 5.5 kg⋅m (54 N⋅m) at 5600 rpm (KK3 VIVIO MT version)

Used in:

- Subaru Rex
- Subaru Vivio
- Subaru Pleo

=== EN07F (Naturally Aspirated EMPi) ===
The EN07C engine (with a carburetor) became EN07F with EMPi. The rocker cover on the delivery service version had a crimson ceramic coating.

- SOHC 8-valve
- Compression ratio: 9.8
- Specification Reference: 48 PS (35 kW) at 6400 rpm, 5.8 kg⋅m (57 N⋅m) at 3200 rpm (TV1 series Sambar)

=== EN07S (Naturally Aspirated SPI) ===
Was installed in the Pleo Van EGI SPI (single point injection) engine design.

- SOHC 8-valve
- Compression ratio: 10.0
- Specification Reference: 45 PS (33 kW) at 6400 rpm, 5.7 kg⋅m (56 N⋅m) at 4000 rpm

Used in:

- Subaru Pleo

=== EN07V (Naturally Aspirated SPI) ===
The EN07F with EMPi became an EN07V with SPI. The rocker cover on the delivery service version also had a crimson ceramic coating.

- SOHC 8-valve
- Compression ratio: 10.1
- Specification Reference: 46 PS (34 kW) at 6400 rpm, 5.9 kg⋅m (58 N⋅m) at 4000 rpm (TV1/2 and TT1/2 series Sambar)

=== EN07Y (supercharger EMPi) ===
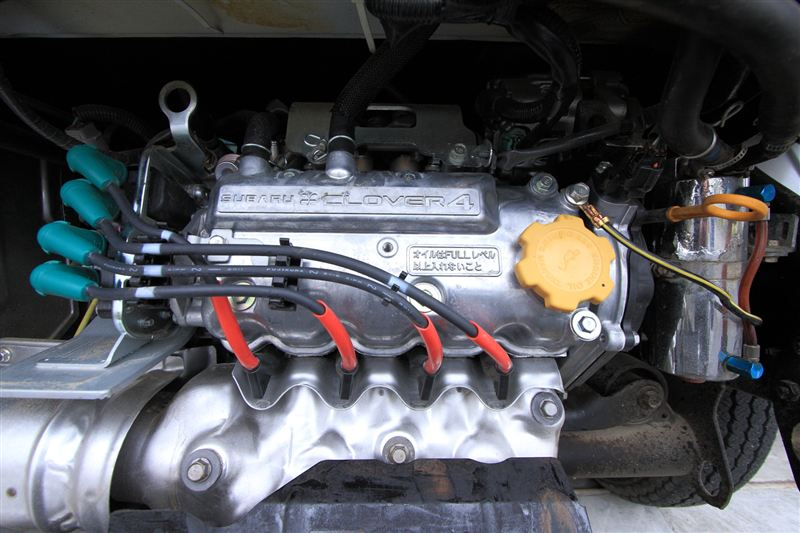
The EN07Y engine in a Subaru Sambar

The Rear engine/Rear drive version initially installed in the Sambar used a distributor, but a distributorless ignition was used from 1996 on. Like the EN07F, the high durability version used in the delivery-service version has a rocker cover decorated with a crimson ceramic coating.

- SOHC 8-valve
- Supercharger
- Compression ratio: 8.3
- Specification Reference: 55 PS (40 kW) at 6200 rpm, 7.1 kg⋅m (70 N⋅m) at 3800 rpm (KV4 series Sambar Touring)

58 PS (43 kW) at 6000 rpm, 7.5 kg⋅m (74 N⋅m) at 4400 rpm (TV1 series Sambar Dias)

=== EN07W (mild charge SPI) ===
Equipped with a CVT for Pleo; previously called "mild charge". For power and fuel economy the engine has both SPI and a low-pressure supercharger without intercooling.

- SOHC 8-valve supercharger
- Compression ratio: 8.9
- Specification Reference: 58 PS (43 kW) at 6400 rpm, 7.3 kg⋅m (72 N⋅m) at 4000 rpm

Subaru Pleo L (CVT transmission)

=== EN07U (mild charge EMPi) ===
The EN07W engine became EN07U when fitted with EMPi and a small intercooler. The L-type Subaru Pleo late in the generation.

- SOHC 8-valve supercharger intercooler (mild change)
- Compression ratio: 8.9
- Specification Reference: 60 PS (44 kW) at 6400 rpm, 7.6 kg⋅m (75 N⋅m) at 4000 rpm

Subaru Pleo L (CVT transmission)

=== EN07Z (IC supercharger with EMPi) ===
The EN variant for Rex's hot model and for Pleo RM. The MPFI fuel injection (EMPi) was reset to make power at lower engine speeds.

- SOHC 8-valve supercharged and intercooled
- Compression ratio: 8:5.1
- Specification Reference: 64 PS (47 kW) at 6400 rpm, 8.6 kg⋅m (84 N⋅m) at 4400 rpm (Subaru Rex VX / Subaru Vivio GX)

64 PS (47 kW) at 6000 rpm, 9.1 kg⋅m (89 N⋅m) at 3600 rpm (Subaru Pleo RM)

Used in:

- Subaru Rex VX
- Subaru Vivio GX
- Subaru Pleo RM

=== EN07D (dohc AVCS) ===
The Subaru R2 was fitted with this version from its debut. It has a variable valve timing DOHC head and direct ignition.

- DOHC 16-valve AVCS
- Specifications: 54 PS (40 kW) at 6400 rpm, 6.4 kg⋅m (63 N⋅m) at 4400 rpm (R1, R2, Stella)

Used in:

- Subaru R2
- Subaru R1
- Subaru Stella

=== EN07X (DOHC IC with supercharger) ===
The Vivio RX-R was developed at the time that the DOHC head design appeared. It adopted direct push and a high lift cam like Toyota, but the timing belt drives only the exhaust camshaft; the method of driving the intake cam is synchronous from there. This 660 cc DOHC narrows the valve angle slightly aiming for a compact combustion chamber. The first-launched and latest versions take regular gasoline, but there is also a high-octane gasoline version. Cylinder head channel was changed for Subaru Pleo when heat damage appeared in the cylinder farthest away from the radiator.

- Supercharger intercooler with a DOHC 16 Valve
- Compression ratio: 9.0
- Specification Reference: 64 PS (47 kW) at 7200 rpm, 10.8 kg⋅m (106 N⋅m) at 4000 rpm (Subaru Vivio RX-R)

64 PS (47 kW) at 6000 rpm, 10.5 kg⋅m (103 N⋅m) at 3200 rpm (Subaru Pleo RS)

Used in:

- Subaru Vivio RX-R
- Subaru Pleo RS
- Subaru R2
- Subaru R1
- Subaru Stella

== EN08 ==
Export models were often equipped with a larger version of the EN engine, Subaru's 758 cc carburetted four-cylinder EN08 powerplant. Sold as the Subaru Fiori in Australia, this model was also marketed as the M80 and the Mini Jumbo in other export markets. The larger displacement was attained by stroking the engine to 77.0 mm (3.03 in) while retaining the original's bore and cylinder spacing.

- SOHC 8-valve, carburettor
- Displacement: 758 cc
- Bore × stroke: 56.0 × 77.0 mm
- Compression ratio: —
- Specification Reference: 42 PS (31 kW) at 6000 rpm, 59 N⋅m (44 lb⋅ft) at 3600 rpm (European spec M80/Mini Jumbo)
