= Subaru Pleo =

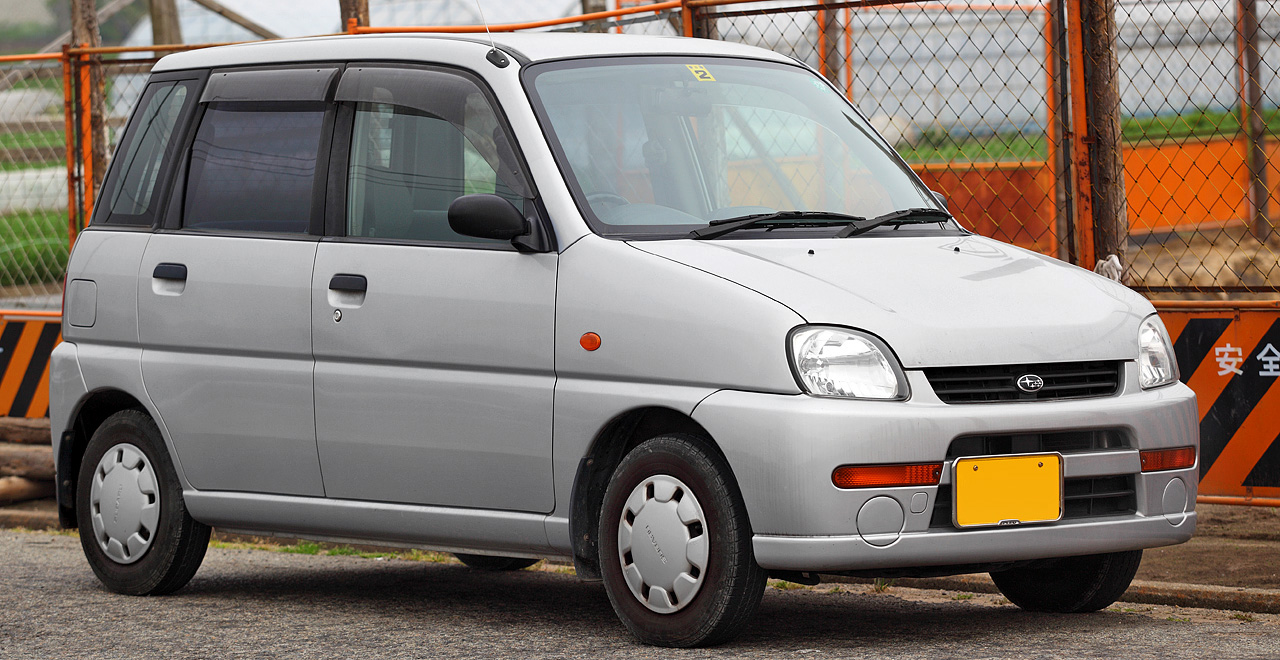

Overview
- Manufacturer: Subaru (1998–2009); Daihatsu (2010–2018)
- Also called: Daihatsu Mira (2010–2018)
- Production: 1998–2018

Body and chassis
- Class: Kei car
- Body style: 5-door microvan (1998–2009); 3/5-door hatchback (2010–2018)
- Layout: FWD/4WD
- Related: Subaru Stella; Subaru R2; Subaru R1; Subaru Lucra

Powertrain
- Engine: 658cc EN07 I4
- Transmission: 5-speed manual i-CVT

Dimensions
- Wheelbase: 2,310 mm (90.9 in)
- Length: 3,395 mm (133.7 in)
- Width: 1,475 mm (58.1 in)
- Height: 1,550–1,625 mm (61.0–64.0 in)

Chronology
- Predecessor: Subaru Vivio
- Successor: Subaru Pleo Plus

The Subaru Pleo is a kei car marketed by the Japanese automaker Subaru from 1998 to 2018.

The Pleo is taller than conventional kei car hatchbacks, but shorter than the definitive microvan, the Suzuki Wagon R, and was available with a variety of 658 cc I4 engines: SOHC, DOHC, and supercharged in two different trim levels. It competed with the Honda Life, Daihatsu Move, and the Mitsubishi Toppo in the tall wagon segment of kei cars in Japan.

The name "pleo" is Latin meaning "to fill" or "to fulfill."

== First generation – RA1/RA2/RV1/RV2 (1998-2009) ==
The first-generation Pleo first went on sale in Japan on October 9, 1998, replacing the Vivio (a conventional kei car hatchback), when Japanese regulations dictated a size change in the kei car tax bracket, and every kei car model from every make was redesigned as a result. The car was available with three variations of the EN07 engine; a naturally aspirated one with 46 PS (34 kW), a sporty supercharged one with 64 PS (47 kW), and also a "mildcharged" version which aimed for power characteristics similar to those of a one-liter car. The mildcharged version has a supercharger (with lower boost pressure) and 60 PS (44 kW). The original television advertisement for the Pleo broadcast nationally across Japan throughout the fourth quarter of 1998 featured a hip hop remix for the aria Un bel dì vedremo from the opera Madama Butterfly by Italian composer Giacomo Puccini as its background music. The Vivio continued to be sold alongside the Pleo until the Vivio was discontinued on October 31.

In June 1999, Subaru launched a retro-styled and better equipped edition of the Pleo, called the Nesta. This has a whole new front design, including new fenders, to accommodate a chromed grille and (twin) round headlights. It featured the entire engine range of the Pleo. In October, a sporty edition was launched, called the LS. At the 1999 Tokyo Motor Show, an LPG-powered prototype with a modernized version of the Nesta's front end was shown, with the name "Pleo Nicot," (stylized as NiCOT) although it was not to enter production for another year. In December, an Le edition was launched.

In May 2000, Subaru launched a G Edition of the Pleo Nesta. In October, the first facelifted edition was launched. In December, the cheery-looking model called the Pleo Nicot was finally launched. Using single round headlights and a small smile-shaped grille, it used the Nesta's model-specific front fenders in a more modern way. The only engine option was the (gasoline-powered) mildcharged version.

In May 2001, a more upgraded sporty version of the Pleo was launched, called the RS. This model is sometimes called the RM. In October, a second facelifted edition was launched.

In January 2002, the L Plus Package and F Special editions were both launched. In May, three four-wheel drive editions, the RS Limited II, the LS Limited and the F Limited, were launched to commemorate Subaru 4WD's fortieth anniversary. In October, a third facelifted edition was launched.

In May 2003, four editions of the Pleo, the FS Limited, the FS Special, the L Special and the Nesta GS Special, were launched. In June, the RS Limited and LS Limited were both facelifted. Meanwhile, a new edition of the Pleo, the L Special Color Selection, was launched. The R2, was introduced on December 8. After 2003, the Pleo was sold alongside the R2. As of January 2004, the supercharged engines were no longer available, leaving only the naturally aspirated version as the Pleo was repositioned beneath Subaru's newer kei class offerings. The mildcharged option returned twelve months later, only to disappear definitely in June 2006, after the Stella's introduction.

In June 2007, the F model was discontinued. The discontinuation left the Van A model as the only trim level.

In December 2009, the Pleo was discontinued.

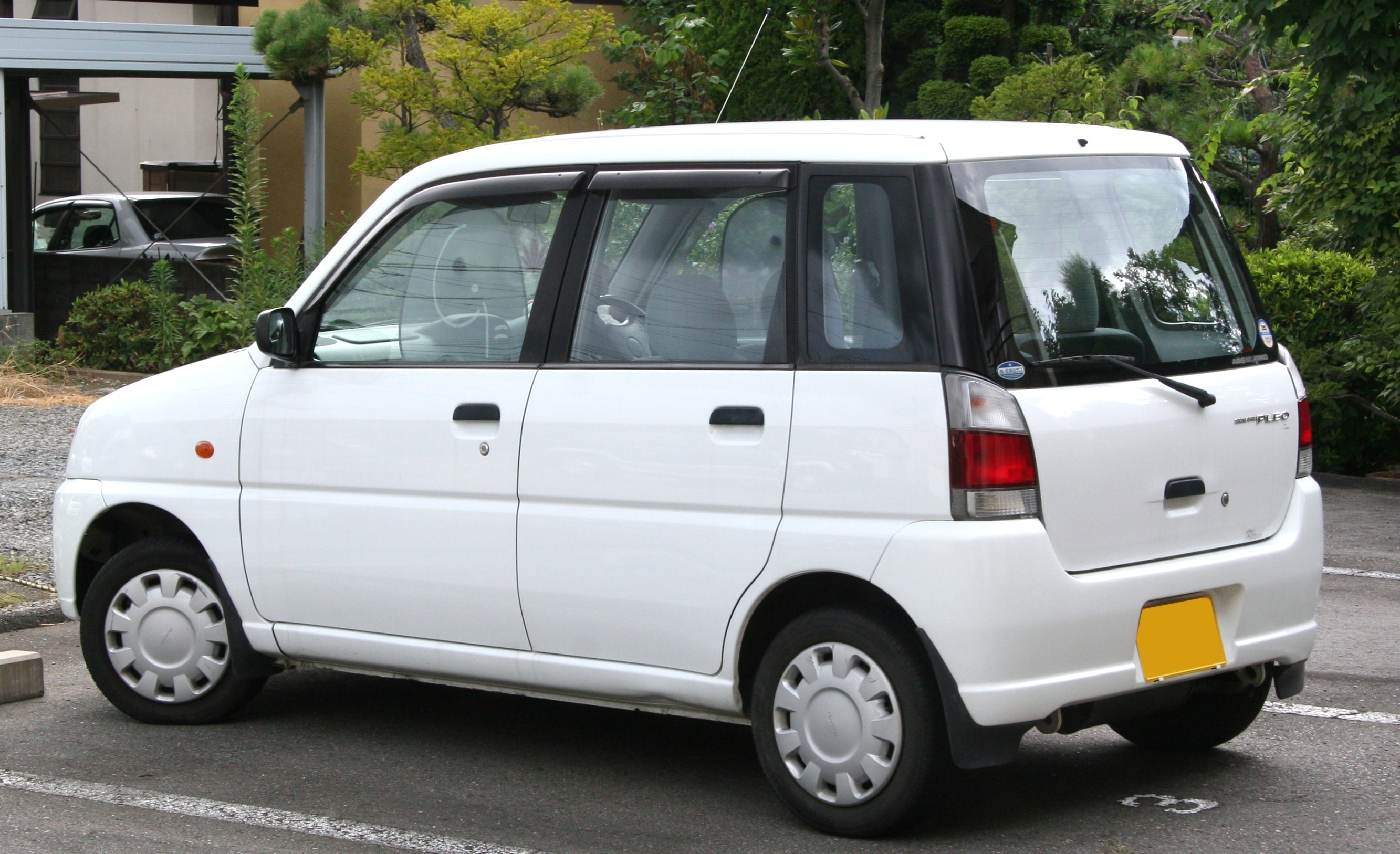
Rear view

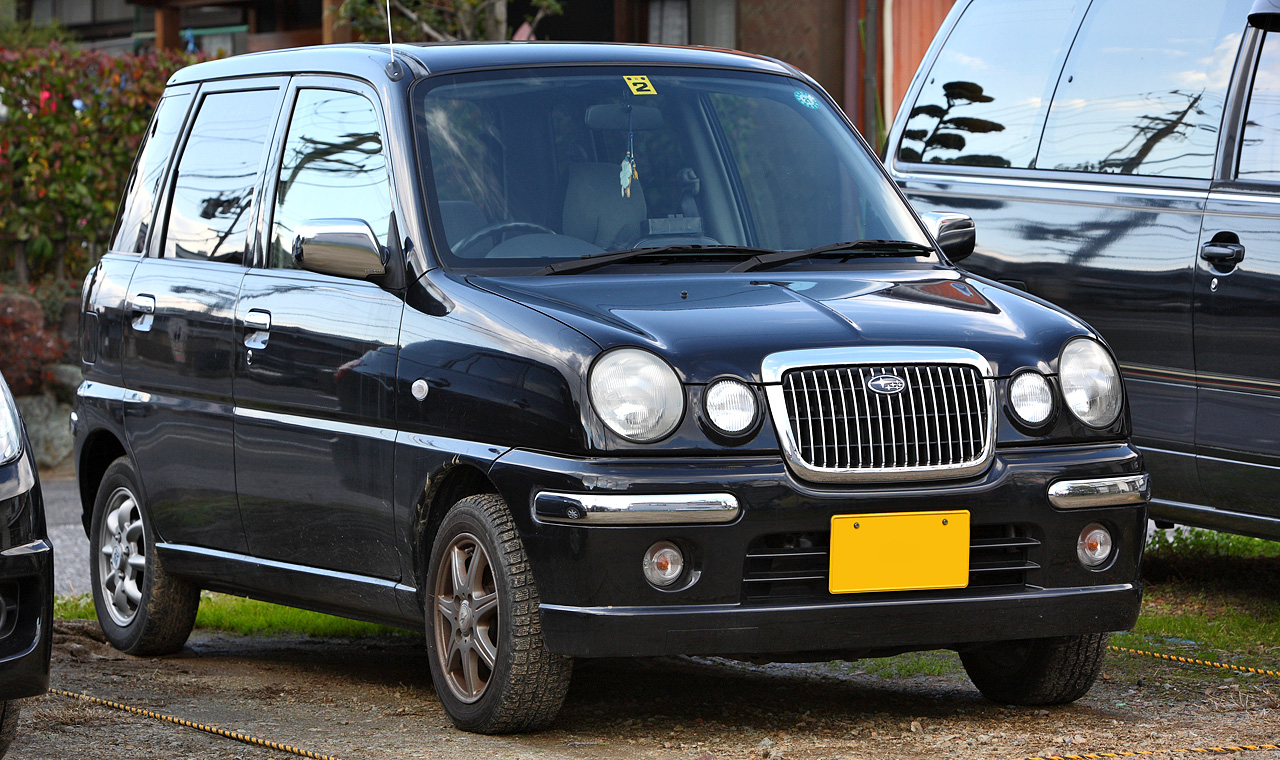
The retro-styled Pleo Nesta

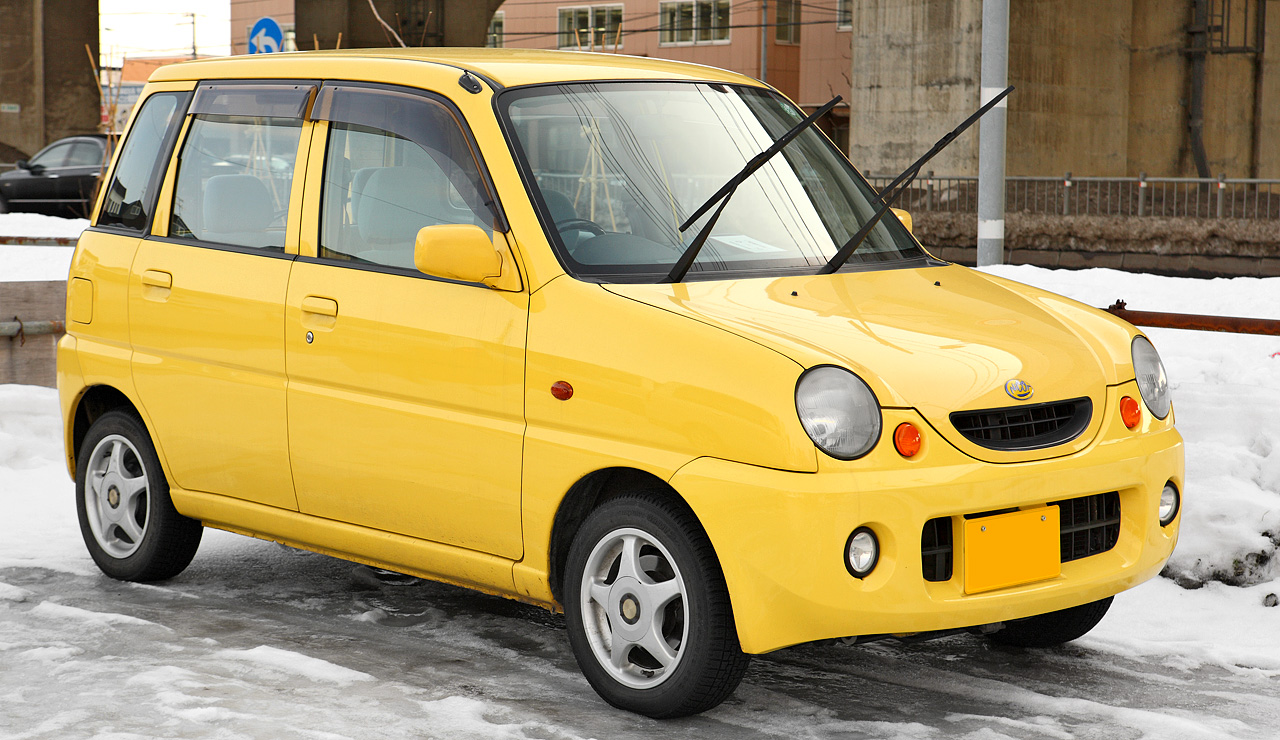
The Pleo Nicot

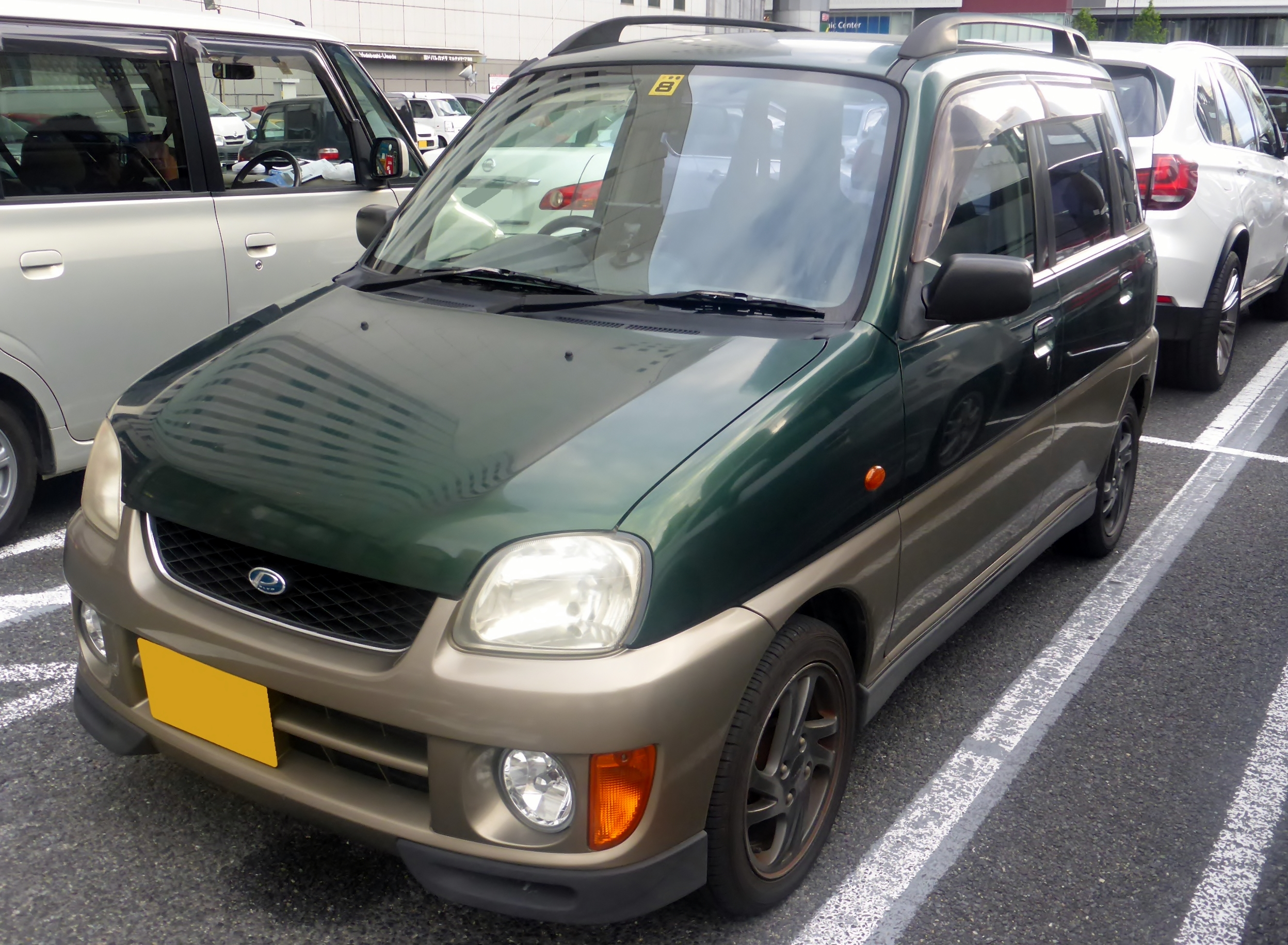
The sporting Pleo RM

== Second generation - L275F/L285F/L275B/L285B (2010-2018) ==
Subaru Pleo
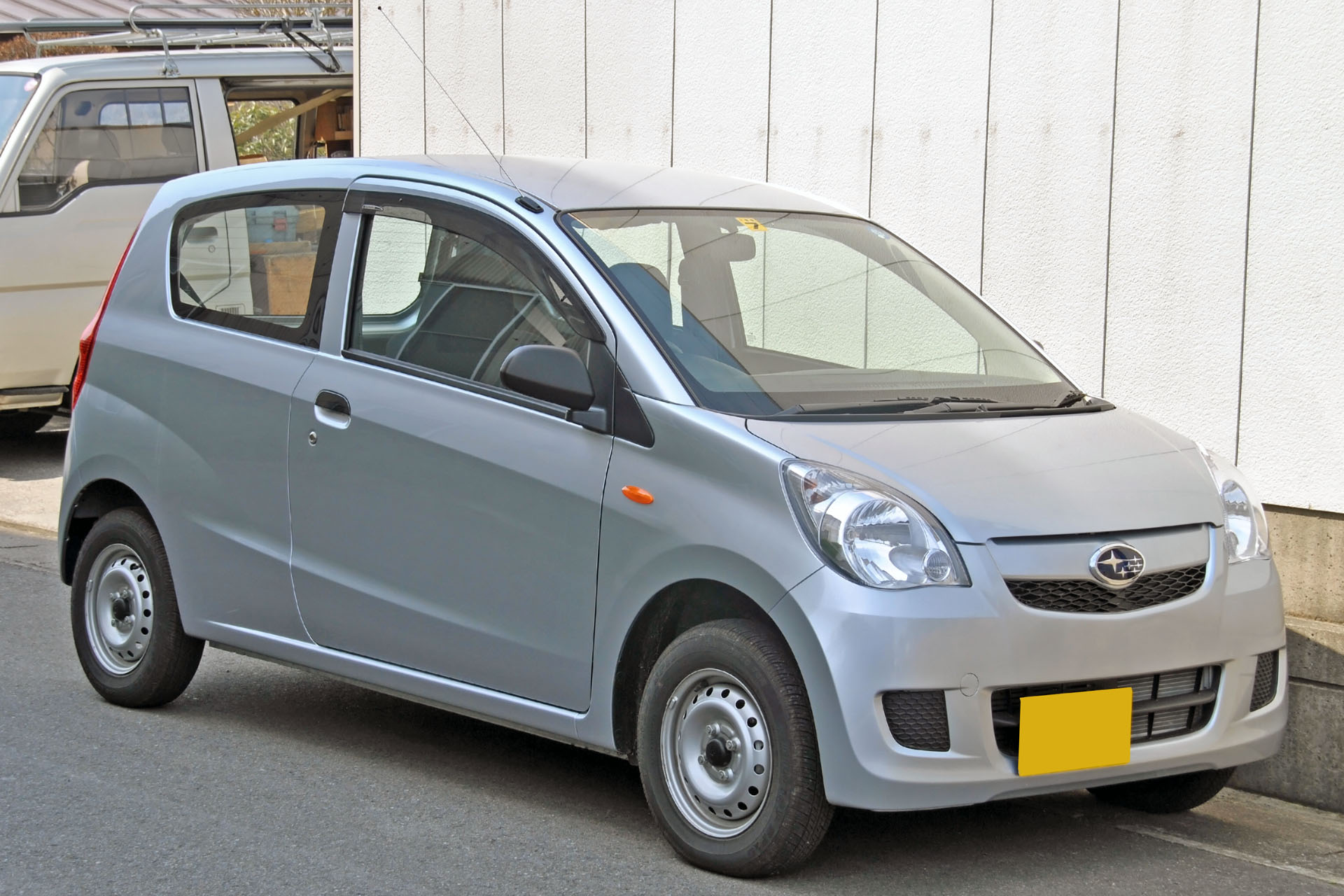

Overview
- Manufacturer: Daihatsu
- Also called: Daihatsu Mira
- Production: 2010–2018

Body and chassis
- Class: Kei car City car (A)
- Body style: 3/5-door hatchback
- Related: Daihatsu Mira; Subaru Lucra

Chronology
- Predecessor: Subaru R1/R2
- Successor: Subaru Pleo Plus

The second-generation Pleo first went on sale in Japan on April 20, 2010. Due to Subaru's corporate investment by Toyota, this second generation is manufactured by Daihatsu instead of Subaru, and is a rebadged Daihatsu Mira.
