= Subaru Rex =

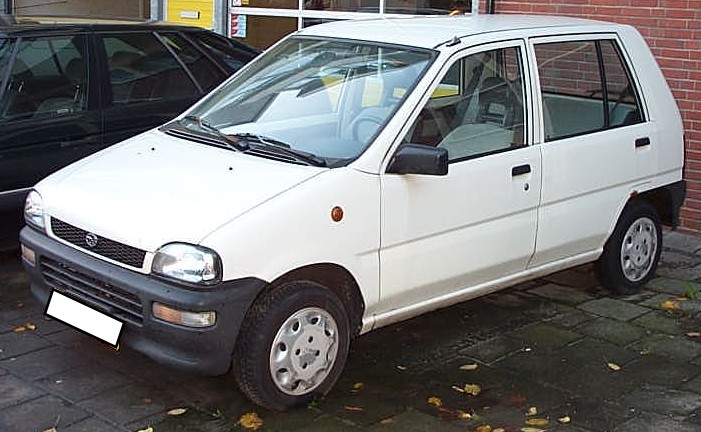

Overview
- Manufacturer: Subaru
- Also called: Subaru 500/600/700; Subaru Fiori; Subaru Ace; Subaru M60/M70/M80; Subaru Mini Jumbo; Subaru Sherpa; Subaru Viki
- Production: 1972–1992
- Assembly: Subaru-chō Plant, Ōta, Gunma, Japan

Body and chassis
- Class: Microcar/kei car
- Layout: rear engine, rear drive (1972–1981); FF / AWD (1981–1992)
- Related: Subaru Justy

Chronology
- Predecessor: Subaru R-2
- Successor: Subaru Vivio

The Subaru Rex (Japanese: スバル・レックス, Hepburn: Subaru Rekkusu) is a kei class automobile manufactured and marketed for model years 1972–1992 by Subaru primarily for the Japanese Domestic Market, although it was also sold in Europe, South America, Australia and the Caribbean — variously as the Ace, Viki, Sherpa, 500/600/700, Mini Jumbo, or M60/M70/M80.

The Rex superseded the R-2 as Subaru's kei car, and was available in commercial use versions as well as in a passenger car version. It underwent major changes in 1976, in fall 1981, and again in late 1986. The second generation Rex (1981–1986) also formed the basis for the larger Subaru Justy.

The name "Rex" comes from the Latin word for "king". This was possibly a response to Suzuki, who referred to their LC10 Fronte as the "Queen of the keis" in their period marketing. In some export markets, the Sambar microvan was marketed as the "Rex Combi".

The "Rex" nameplate has been reused since 2022 as a subcompact crossover SUV based on the A200 series Daihatsu Rocky.

== First generation ==
First generation
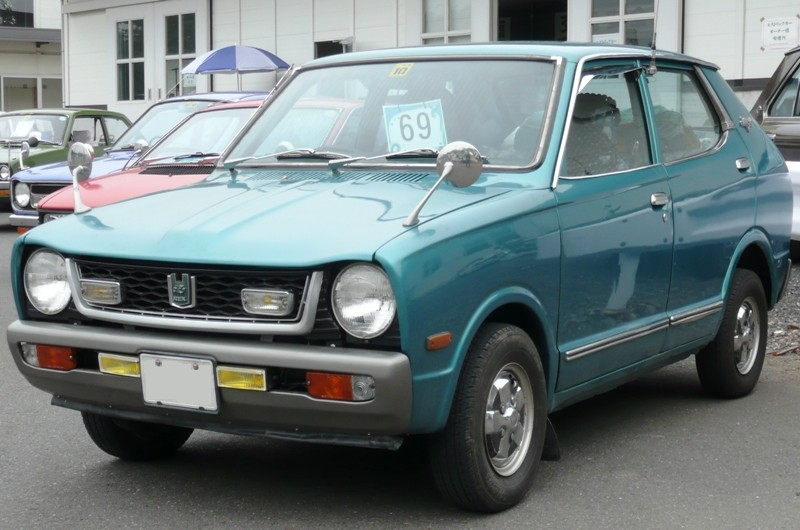

Overview
- Also called: Subaru 500/600
- Production: 06.1972–09.1981

Body and chassis
- Body style: 2/4-door sedan 3-door hatchback (Van/Wagon); 3-door hatchback (Swingback)
- Layout: rear engine, rear drive

Powertrain
- Engine: 356 cc EK34 two-stroke I2; 358 cc EK21 I2; 490 cc EK22 I2; 544 cc EK23 I2
- Transmission: Four/five-speed manual, optional "Autoclutch" in 1980-81

Dimensions
- Wheelbase: 1,920 mm (76 in)
- Length: 2,995 mm (117.9 in) (1972-76); 3185-3,190 mm (126 in) (1976-81)
- Width: 1,295 mm (51.0 in) (1972-76); 1,395 mm (54.9 in) (1976-81)
- Height: 1,255–1,385 mm (49.4–54.5 in)
- Curb weight: 480–570 kg (1,060–1,260 lb)

Chronology
- Predecessor: Subaru R-2

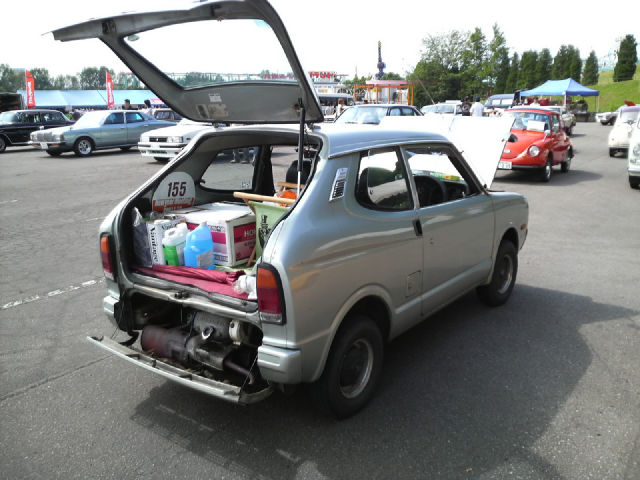
1975–1976 Subaru Rex Van 360, high roofed version with engine placement visible

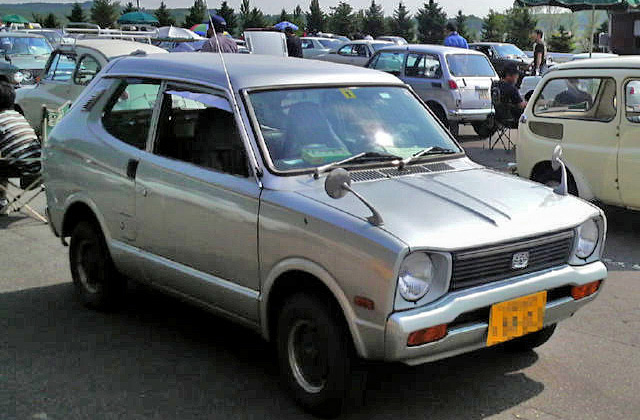
2-door model

The Rex (K21), introduced 15 July 1972, was the replacement for the Subaru R-2, which was itself the replacement for the long lived, but outdated Subaru 360. The R-2 was largely an interim model, a rebodied 360, originally including its air-cooled two-stroke engine. Accordingly, it lasted less than three years, whereas the 360 was marketed for 11 years and the rear-engined Rex for nine.

The Subaru Rex represented a fresh design, sharing little of its appearance with the Subaru 360, although they were mechanically the same and shared a rear-engine layout. The Rex also retained the 360/R-2's rear swing axle. The Rex's styling resembled Subaru's new compact car, the Leone. The Rex originally featured the same water-cooled 356 cc EK34 two-stroke engine as used in the R-2, and was available only as a two-door sedan. Its engine created 32, 35 or 37 PS (24, 26 or 27 kW). In February 1973 a four-door sedan was added. The Van was registerable as a commercial vehicle, allowing for considerable savings in taxes and fees. The EK34 engine came with a 32 PS (24 kW) single carburetor on the Custom L, Super L, and other trim levels down to Standard, or a 37 PS (27 kW) double carburetor for the sporty GSR. The TS (Touring Sport) received a 35 PS (26 kW) iteration. The GSR was also somewhat lower than its counterparts, due to radial tires being fitted.

In October 1973 the two-stroke was replaced by a 358 cc rear-mounted, watercooled, two-cylinder, four-stroke engine called the EK21. This produced 31 PS (23 kW) at a peaky 8000 rpm and 3.0 kg⋅m (29 N⋅m; 22 lb⋅ft) of torque at 6500 rpm, and featured Subaru Exhaust Emissions Control (SEEC). The car also received a minor facelift (with a "frowny" rather than the smiling grille seen on the turquoise four-door in the infobox being the most obvious difference) and a new chassis code: K22. Front disc brakes were also introduced as an option at the same time. The four-stroke Rex could reach a top speed of 110 km/h (68 mph). The three-door, two-seater "Van" (K42) arrived in February of the next year, when a five-speed version (Custom5) was also added. The Van's engine was in a lesser state of tune and produces 27 PS (20 kW).

In September 1974, along with a minor facelift consisting of a new grille and bumpers adjusted to allow for the fitment of larger license plates, a "Wagon" version (K26) appeared. This received four permanent seats, but was no longer registerable as a commercial vehicle and had a considerably lower max load. At the same time, a "Super L" version of the Van was added. The Wagon also received a lower tuned four-stroke engine, with 28 PS (21 kW) at 7500 rpm; but torque increased somewhat to 3.1 kg⋅m (30 N⋅m; 22 lb⋅ft) at 5700 rpm. In April 1975 the Van received a higher roof and became a four-seater. This was necessitated by Japanese commercial vehicle regulation which require the floor to be completely flat when the rear seat is folded. Because the Rex's engine was mounted in the rear, the cargo floor was rather high, meaning that more head room would be required before a seat could be installed. The Wagon continued in production until the SEEC-T version was introduced in December, but it lost most of its market with the availability of a four-seater Van.

28 PS became the power output of all versions of the Rex for model year 1976 after the SEEC-T (Subaru Exhaust Emission Control - Thermal and Thermodynamic) emissions control system was introduced in December 1975. Torque was down to 2.9 kg⋅m (28 N⋅m; 21 lb⋅ft) at 6000 rpm. The equipment levels were also reshuffled, with the B-type replacing the Standard and then rising from the AI via the AIG and AII to the AIIG on top. The AII and AIIG versions received disc brakes in front, but the five-speed was no longer available.

=== 550 cc era ===
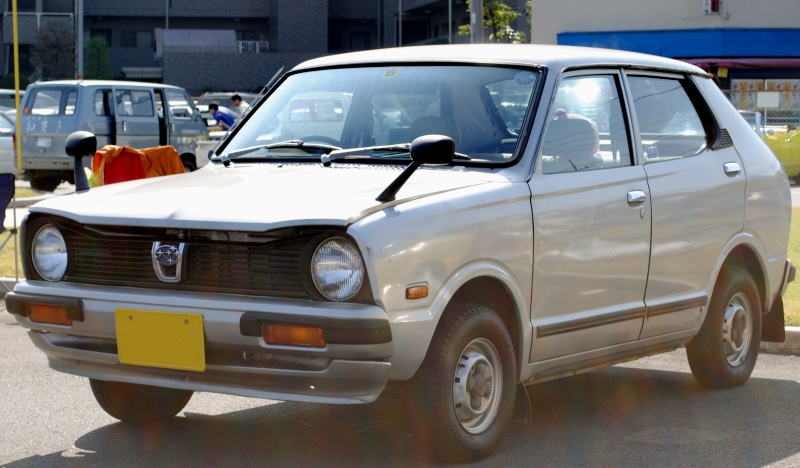
Subaru Rex 550

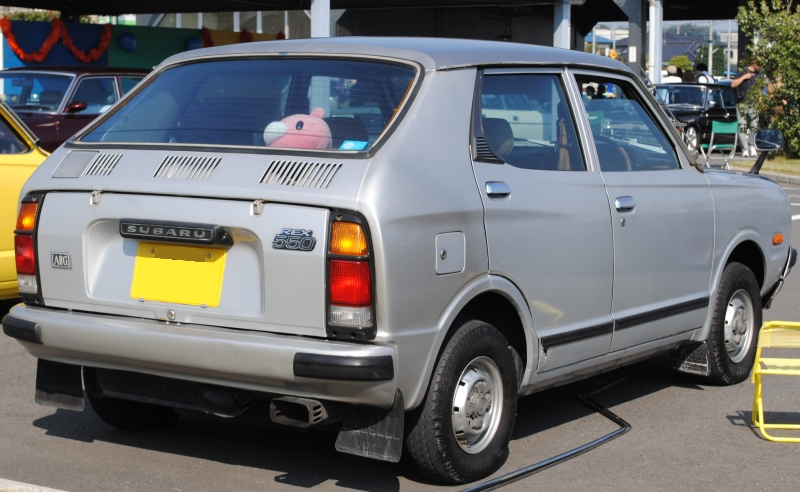
1979–1981 Subaru Rex 550 AIIG

In response to new regulations for Kei cars introduced for 1976, Subaru introduced the larger-engined Rex 5 in May of that year. It retained the earlier bodywork (albeit broadened by 10 cm and with a lengthened bonnet for an overall length of 3,185 mm [125.4 in]) receiving a 490 cc version of the same engine. The Rex 5 (K23, K43 in the Van version) engine was still of two cylinders and an overhead cam design, and retained the SEEC-T emissions control system. Power increased from the emissions-choked late 360s to 31 PS (23 kW) at 6500 rpm, while torque increased to 3.8 kg⋅m (37 N⋅m; 27 lb⋅ft) at 4500 rpm. The AIG version was dropped. The Van version received a 28 PS (21 kW) engine (at 6000 rpm) with the same torque, albeit at 500 rpm lower. Van equipment levels were Standard and Super Deluxe. This version (called the Subaru 500 in the export) was short-lived, replaced by the bigger Rex 550 exactly one year after being introduced. In January 1977, the Rex 5 entered production in Taiwan, with a projected monthly output of 100 cars.

The Rex 550, introduced in May 1977, featured the SEEC-T equipped watercooled, two-cylinder, four-stroke 544 cc EK23 series engine. The new emissions equipment, first introduced on the contemporary Leone, meant that the car could meet the upcoming 1978 emissions regulations. Chassis code was K24. The engine remained rear-mounted, coupled to a four-speed manual gearbox, with max power unchanged at 31 PS (23 kW) at a slightly lower 6200 rpm; torque was up to 4.2 kg⋅m (41 N⋅m; 30 lb⋅ft) at 3500 rpm. In addition to the new engine, the gearing was also adjusted and the suspension was improved, to make the car more quiet. The top AIIG model received separate headrests rather than the highback seats, a new houndstooth pattern seat fabric was introduced on AII, the steering wheel was of a new design, and the windshield wipers were painted black.

A comparatively well-equipped Custom L version of the Van (K44) was added to the existing Standard and Super Deluxe models, and air conditioning became an available option for the first time on the Van. As usual, the Vans received a lower powered version of the engine, with 28 PS (21 kW) at 6000 rpm but the same exact torque figures. The Van could take a max load of only 200 kg (440 lb), 100 kg less than most of its competitors. This was counteracted by the Rex Van's comparatively high level of passenger comfort.

The Rex 550 was called the Subaru 600 in most export markets. Subaru made much of the "Multi-Use Lever", which combined the headlight, turn signal, and windshield washer functions. This was not installed on the lowest-spec versions (Type B, Standard).

In March 1978 the Swingback version was added, a two-door sedan which received a larger, opening rear window. The large rear window necessitated a slightly smaller opening to the engine compartment, but this was more than made up for by allowing for access to the rear luggage compartment from the outside. In March 1979, the Rex underwent a very minor facelift, the most visible results being new rims and slightly differing bumpers and a small spoiler in front. Then, in response to the very low priced Suzuki Alto, a decontented version of the Van called "Family Rex" was added in October 1979. It was priced at a very low ¥480,000 (under US$2,000 at the time). An automatic clutch option was added on several Rex models in March 1980.

== Second generation ==
Second generation
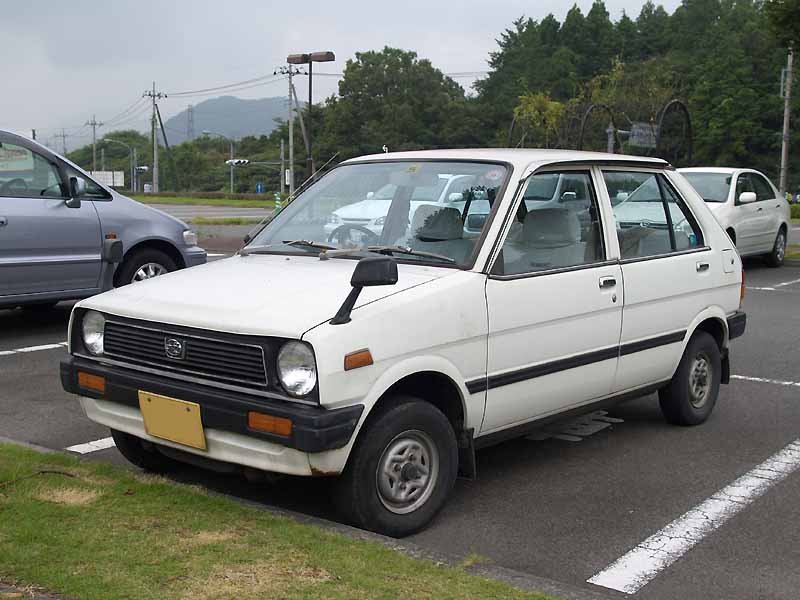
- 1981–1985 Subaru Rex

Overview
- Also called: Subaru 600/700; Subaru Mini Jumbo; Subaru Sherpa; Yunque GHK 7060
- Production: 1981–1986; 1991–2005 (China; under license)

Body and chassis
- Body style: 3/5-door hatchback
- Layout: front engine, front-wheel drive front engine, four-wheel drive
- Related: Subaru Justy

Powertrain
- Engine: 544 cc EK23 I2; 544 cc EK23-T turbo I2; 665 cc EK42 I2

Dimensions
- Wheelbase: 2,255 mm (88.8 in)
- Length: 3,195 mm (125.8 in)
- Width: 1,395 mm (54.9 in)
- Height: 1,350 mm (53 in)
- Curb weight: 565 kg (1,246 lb)

In August 1981, the second-generation Subaru Rex became front-wheel drive, with all-new bodywork and independent suspension all around. At the time, it was stated that the only parts of the rear-engined predecessor to have remained were "two connecting rods and an ashtray". Power remained at 31 PS (23 kW; 31 bhp), with a twin-barrel carburettor. Three and five-door hatchback versions were available. Optional on-demand 4WD became available after October 1983, a first for the class. The 4WD system was electrically engaged by depressing an embedded switch on top of the gear shift. The option of a turbo was introduced on the 4WD Rex in December 1983, to counteract the added weight of the drive system. The "Rex Dinos", a trim level introduced in 1982, was only available by mail order catalog.

In the European markets, this car was originally marketed as the Subaru 600 or Mini Jumbo. In September 1982 it became the Subaru 700, as it received a larger 665 cc version of the two-cylinder, producing 37 PS (27 kW) (a 35 PS version using lower octane gas was also available). The engine used a single-barrel carburettor. Top speed was 125 km/h (78 mph), compared to 110 km/h (68 mph) for the 31 PS (23 kW) domestic version. These cars were 9 cm longer than their domestic counterparts, due to bigger bumpers, and received 12-inch wheels (rather than the ten-inch units used for most models in Japan). Production ended in September 1986, as Subaru was getting ready to introduce the modernized third generation Rex.

The bodyshell of the second generation Rex was also lengthened and widened to become the original Subaru Justy, with a larger 1-litre engine. The Justy remained in production until 1994, outliving the next generation Rex and even the Rex label itself.

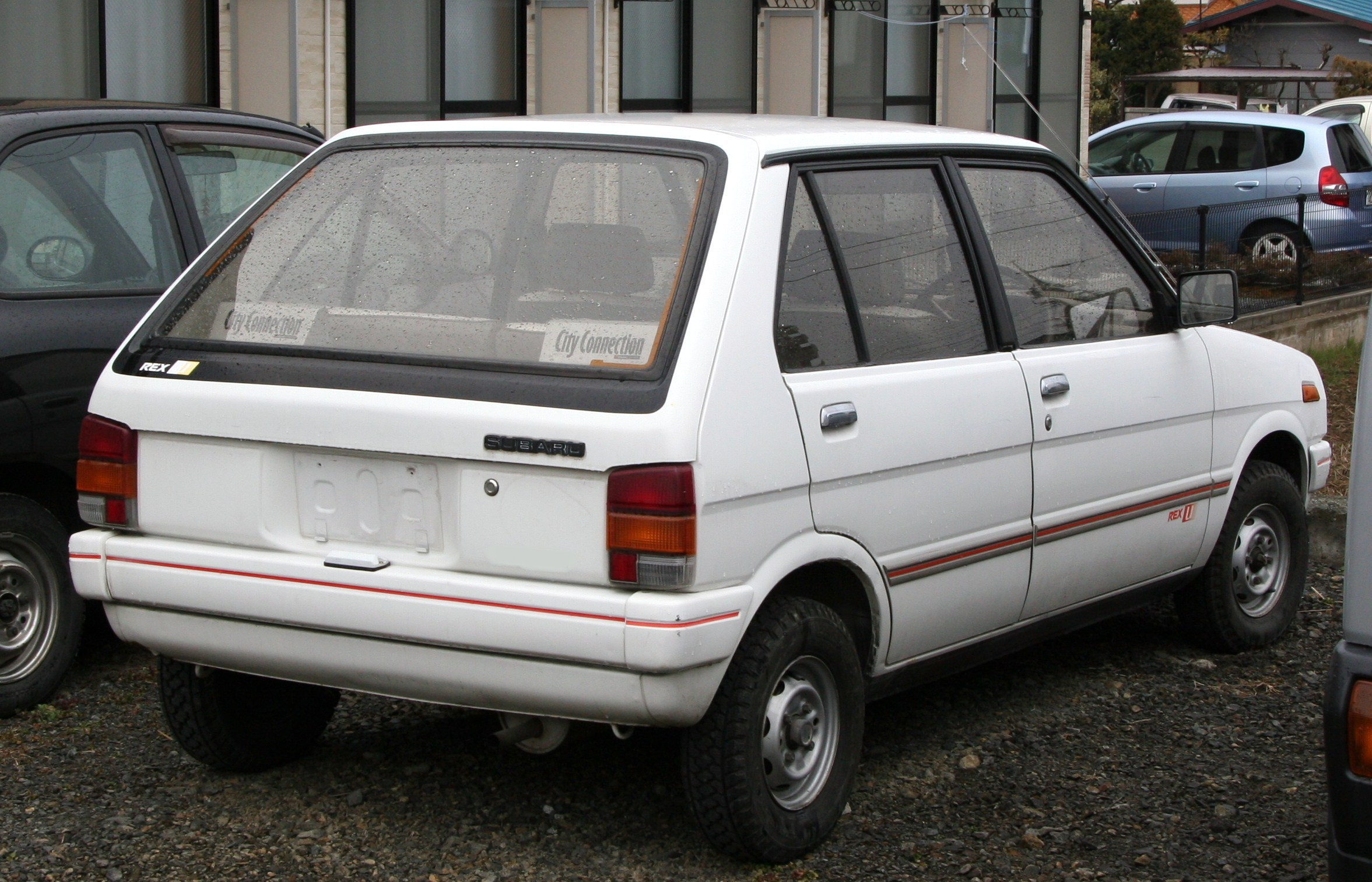
Late Rex U sedan (JDM; rear view)

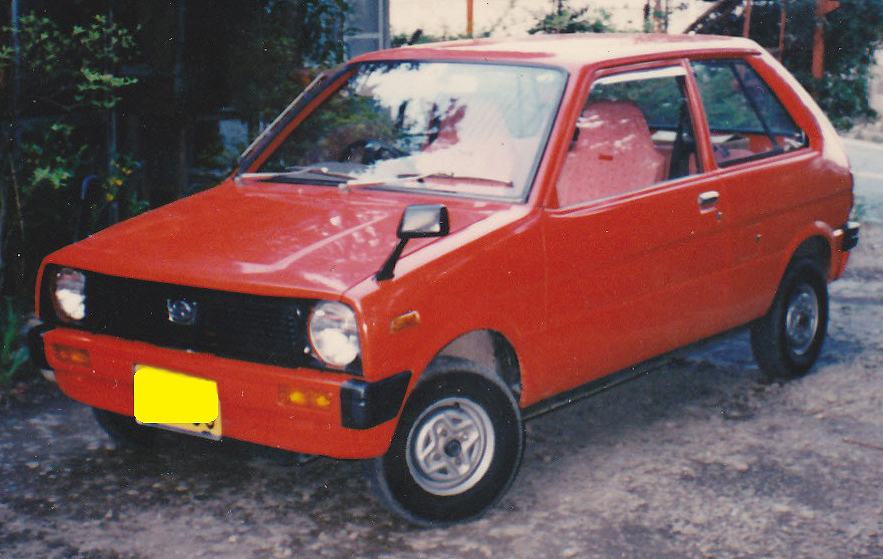
Rex Combi (Van version; JDM)

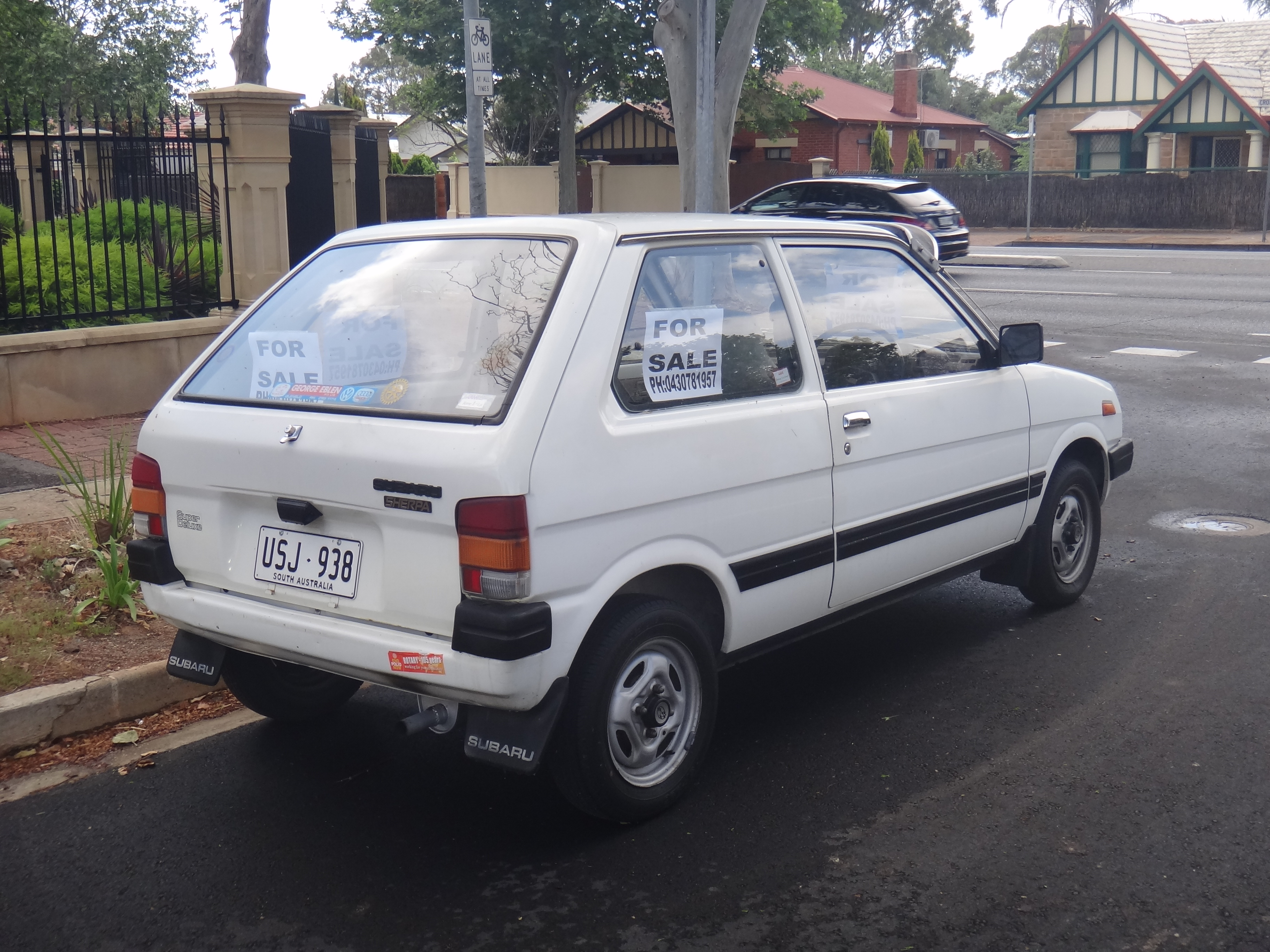
Subaru Sherpa Super Deluxe (Australia)

=== Yunque ===
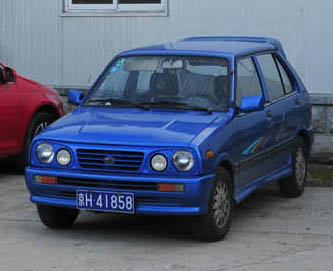
Yunque GHK 7071

Chinese Yunque (Guizhou Aircraft Industry Corporation) built the second generation Subaru Rex under license as the Yunque GHK 7060 between 1991 and 2005. There were also GHK 7060A 'Free Wind' and GHK 7071A 'WOW' iterations, featuring interesting bodykits.

== Third generation ==
Third generation
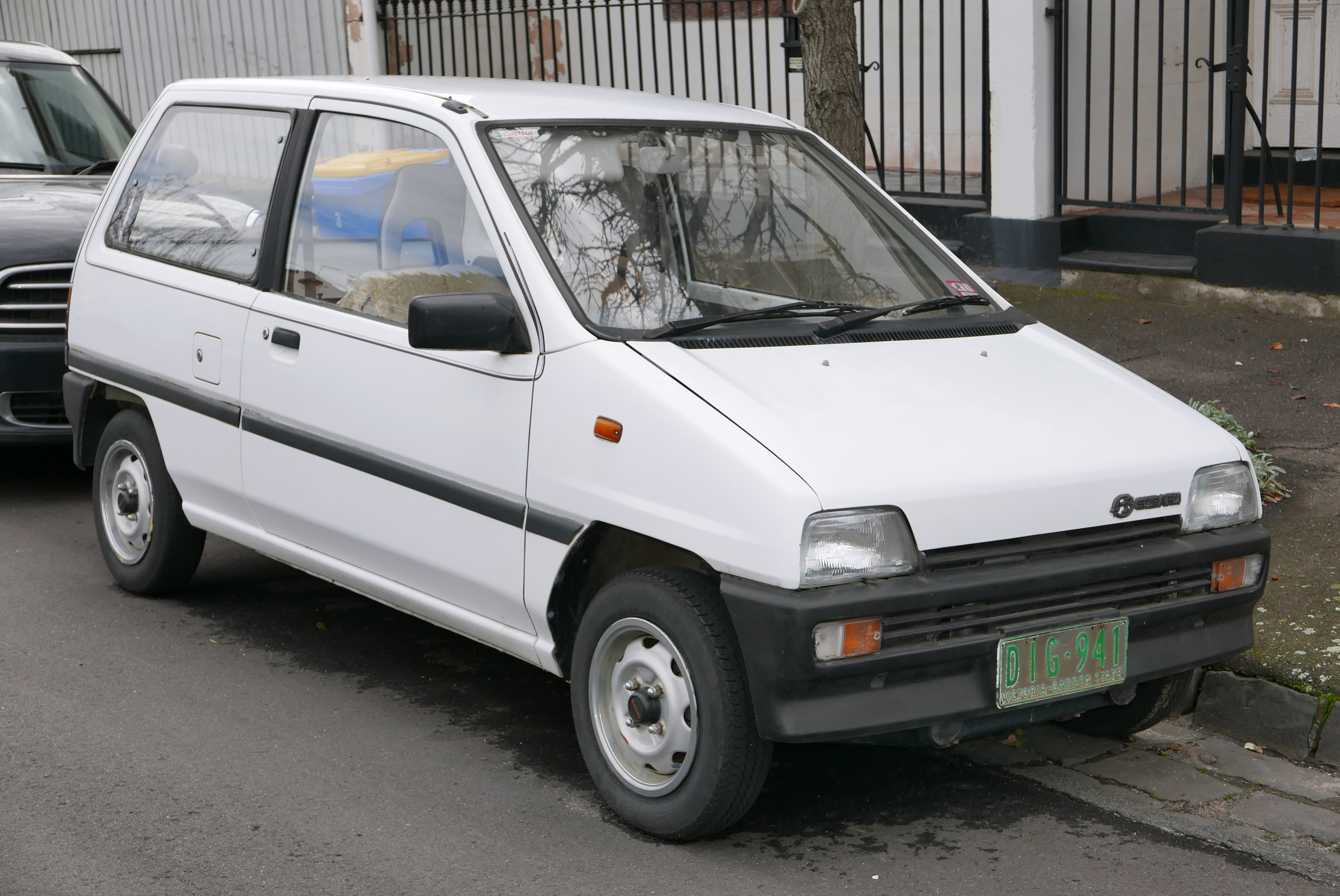

Overview
- Manufacturer: Subaru
- Also called: Subaru Fiori (Australia); Subaru Ace (New Zealand); Subaru M60/M70/M80; Subaru Sherpa (Australia); Subaru Viki; Subaru Mini Jumbo; Subaru Signet (Ireland)
- Production: November 1986–March 1992

Body and chassis
- Body style: 3/5-door hatchback
- Layout: Front-engine, front-wheel-drive; Front-engine, four-wheel-drive

Powertrain
- Engine: 544 cc EK23 I2; 544 cc EK23 supercharged I2; 547 cc EN05A I4; 547 cc EN05Z supercharged I4; 658 cc EN07A/E I4; 658 cc EN07Z supercharged I4; 665 cc EK42 I2 (export); 758 cc EN08 I4 (export)

Dimensions
- Wheelbase: 2,295 mm (90.4 in)
- Length: 3,195–3,295 mm (125.8–129.7 in)
- Width: 1,395 mm (54.9 in)
- Height: 1,360 mm (54 in)
- Curb weight: 590 kg (1,300 lb)

Chronology
- Successor: Subaru Vivio

The third generation (KG/KN) was presented in November 1986 with the commercial spec Rex Combi with either three or five doors (KG1, KG2 with four-wheel drive). The sedan version, intended for private use, was added a month later. The passenger version was called simply "Rex" and was originally only available with five doors; its chassis codes are KN1 (FF) or KN2 (4WD). In addition to an SOHC two-valve engine with 30 PS (22 kW; 30 bhp), a version with three valves per cylinder (two intake and one exhaust) and 36 PS (26 kW; 36 bhp) was also available. There was no turbo version of the new Rex. A two-speed automatic transmission was also available, as was a part-time 4WD system. "Twin Viscous" full-time 4WD with a limited slip differential for the rear axle was made available in February 1987. From this point on, all four-wheel drives received the more powerful three-valve engine. A CVT transmission was added June 1987, called ECVT.

A supercharged version with an intercooler and electronic fuel injection was added to the options list March 1988 as a response to the success of the Alto Works and Mira TR-XX. The output of the engine increased to 55 PS (40 kW; 54 bhp). A supercharger meant less lag than for a turbo, although specific output tended to be somewhat lower than the competition. This was available for both the 3- and 5-door versions. May 1988 saw an available electrically deployed canvas top added to the three-door.

June 1989 saw a gentle facelift and the replacement of the EK series engine to the four-cylinder EN05 "Clover 4" with 38 PS (28 kW; 37 bhp) available to the standard engine and 61 PS (45 kW) from the supercharged engine. This was the first Kei four-cylinder since the Mazda Carol, and was unique to the class. Naturally aspirated models received "cat's eye"-shaped headlamps and a reshaped bonnet while the supercharged models retained the earlier rectangular units, albeit with a new four-hole grille. This, the KH1/2 series Rex (KP1/2 for the commercial Rex Combis), remained available in combination with the ECVT transmission and four-wheel-drive versions, but the two-speed automatic was dropped. In July, export versions (M70 in Europe, Sherpa in Australia) received the same changes and switched from the 665 cc 37 PS (27 kW) two-cylinder to become the M80 in Europe, the Ace in New Zealand and the Fiori in Australia.

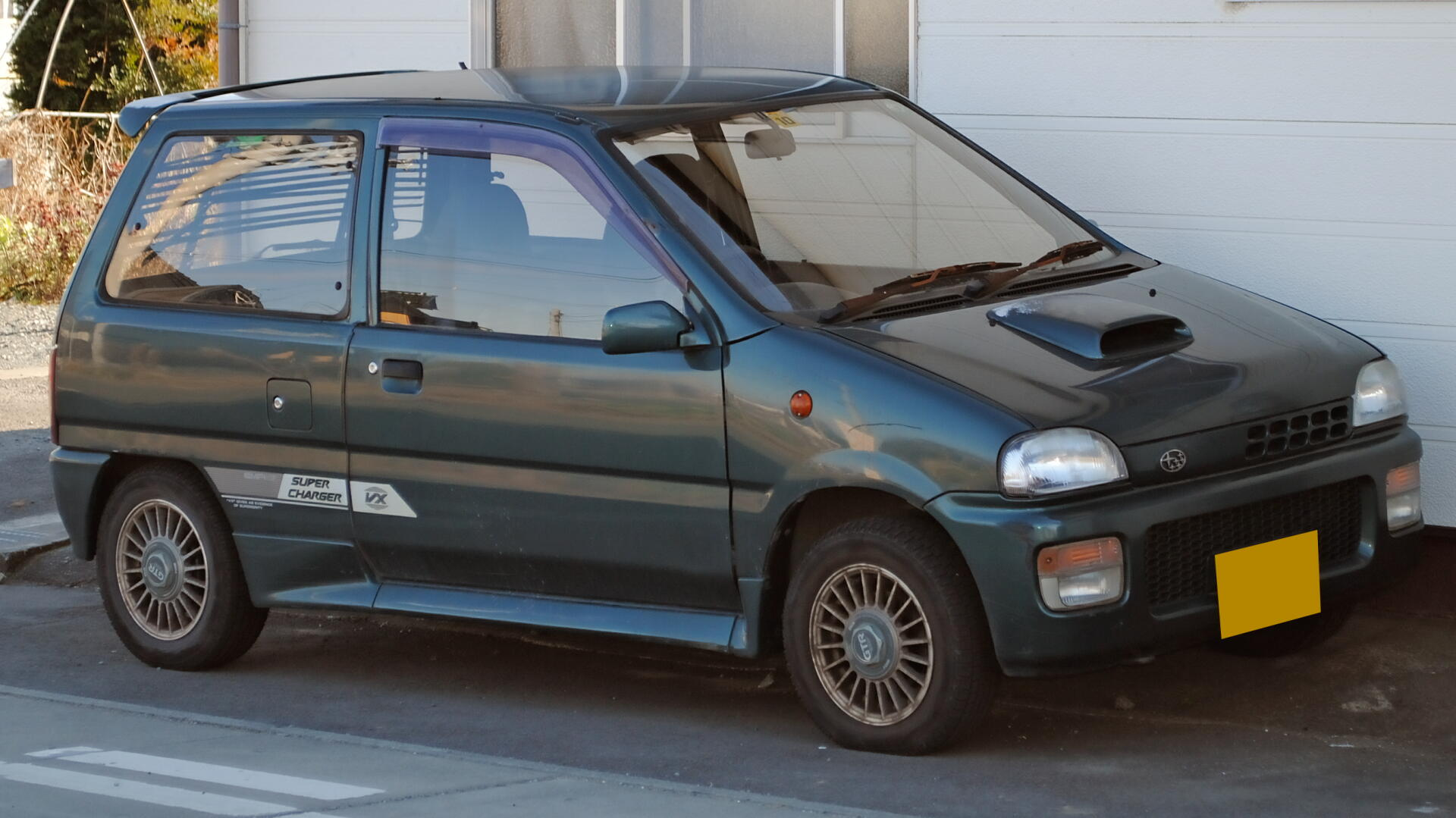
Second facelift, third generation Rex VX Supercharger (KH3)

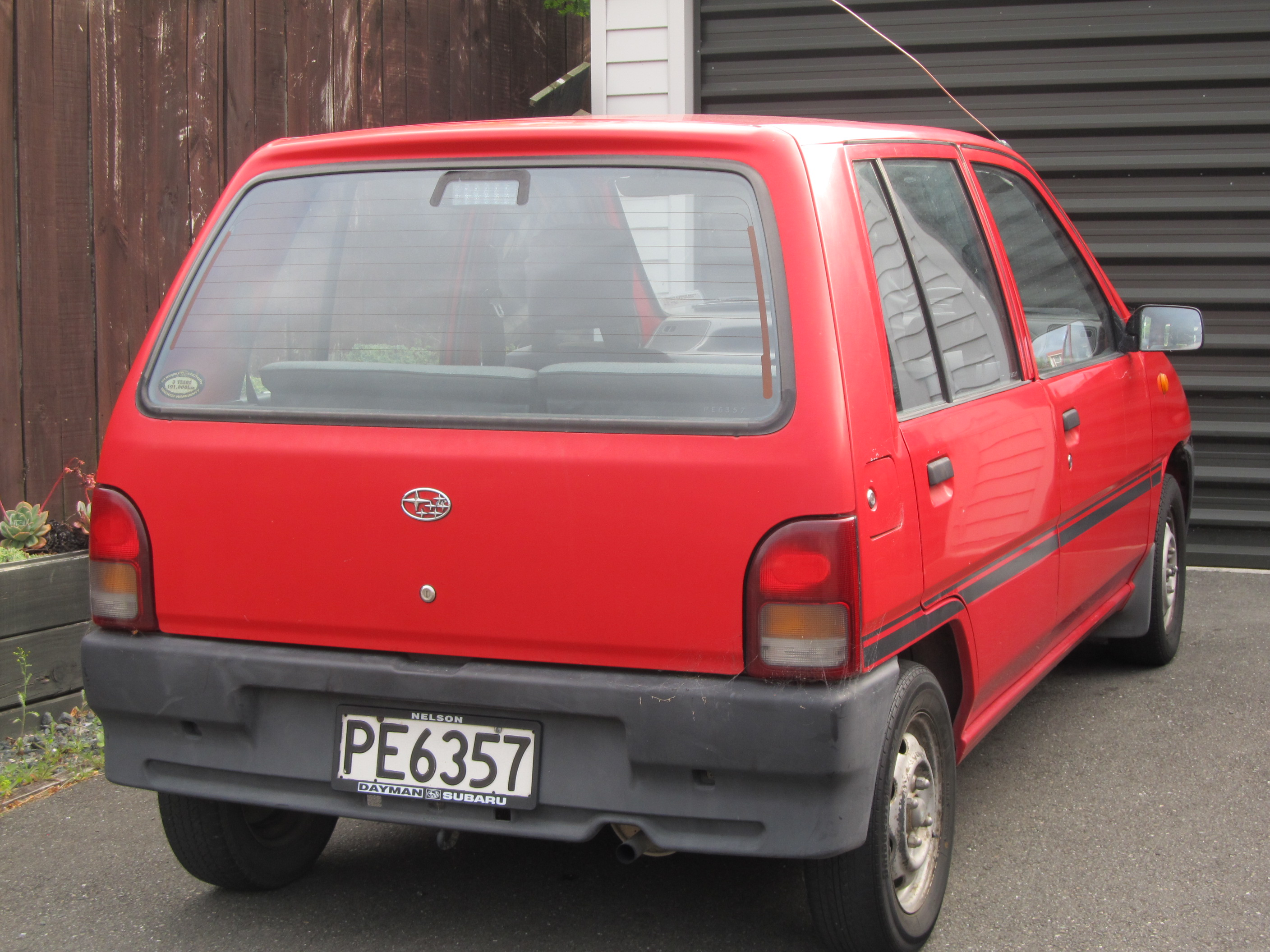
Subaru Ace (New Zealand)

The 550 cc four-cylinder iteration was uncommonly short-lived, as in March 1990 another facelift followed, with a 660 cc version of the EN engine (EN07) and an extended, more rounded nose because of new Kei regulations taking effect. These external differences did not appear in the Australian market until August, and in Europe (Mini Jumbo, M80) by early 1991. This, which was to be the last Rex, received chassis codes KH3 (FF sedan), KH4 (4WD sedan), KP3 (FF commercial), and KP4 (4WD commercial).

Rex is also a common nickname for the high-performance Subaru Impreza WRX, especially in Australia where the actual Rex was originally marketed as the Sherpa and then as the Fiori. The Fiori derivative (sold as such from summer 1989) was also equipped with pink and blue pinstriping from the factory, and a two-year, 50,000 km warranty was offered when new. Equipped with a different engine, the Fiori had Subaru's 758 cc carburetted four-cylinder EN08 powerplant. This engine, producing 42 PS (31 kW) at 6,000 rpm, was also used in those European markets that received the Rex and in New Zealand's Ace. In Europe it was rebadged M80 to reflect the engine displacement. The M80 was available as a three or a five-door, in DX and SDX versions, with the SDX receiving a standard five-speed manual. Top speed was 125 km/h for four-speeds, 130 km/h for five-speeds.

This generation Rex was marketed as the Viki in certain Southeast Asian markets, a name which was also used for a special edition (Rex ViKi) in the Japanese domestic market. The end for the Rex came in March 1992, when it was replaced by the Vivio. A total of 1,902,811 Subaru Rexes were built in its lifetime. Recently the Rex has become somewhat of a cult car in Japan, being popular in front-wheel-drive drift events.
