= Subaru R2 =

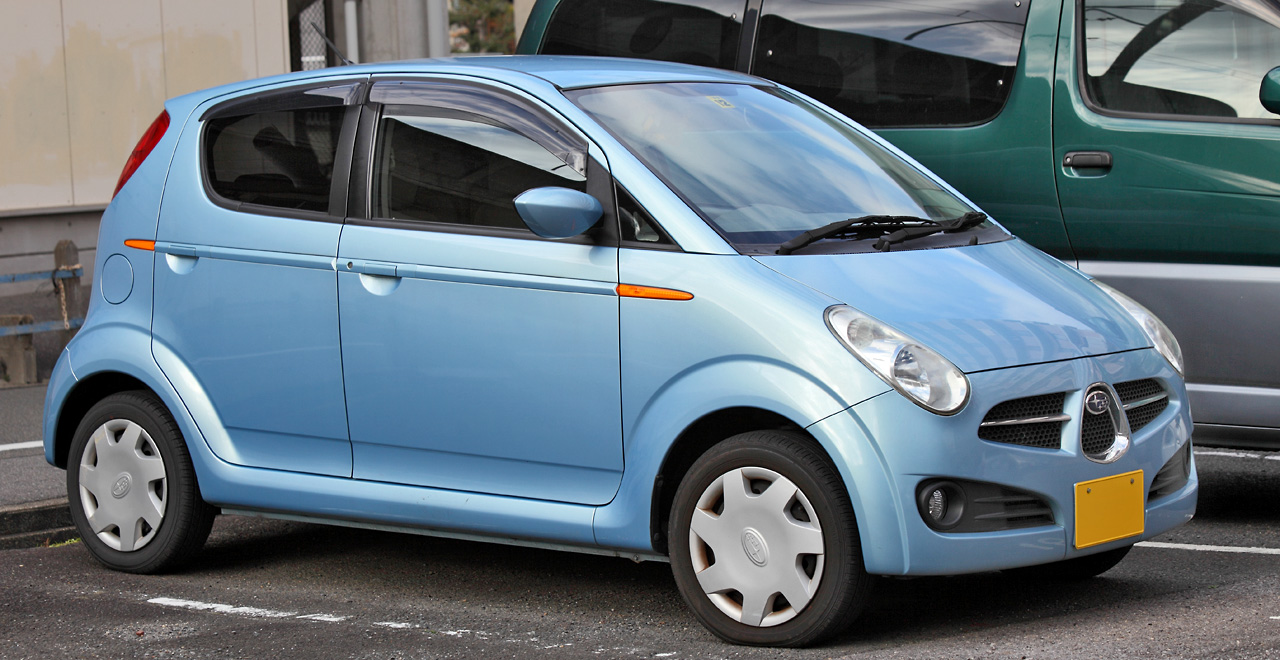

Overview
- Production: 2003–2010
- Assembly: Japan: Ōta, Gunma (Ōta plant)
- Designer: Erwin Leo Himmel

Body and chassis
- Class: Kei car
- Body style: 5-door hatchback
- Related: Subaru R1

Powertrain
- Engine: 658 cc EN07E I4; 658 cc EN07D DOHC AVCS I4; 658 cc EN07X DOHC supercharged I4 (STi)
- Transmission: 5-speed manual iCVT

Dimensions
- Wheelbase: 2,360 mm (92.9 in)
- Length: 3,395 mm (133.7 in)
- Width: 1,475 mm (58.1 in)
- Height: 1,520 mm (59.8 in)
- Curb weight: 880 kg (1,940.1 lb)

Chronology
- Predecessor: Subaru Pleo (first generation)
- Successor: Subaru Lucra; Subaru Pleo (second generation)

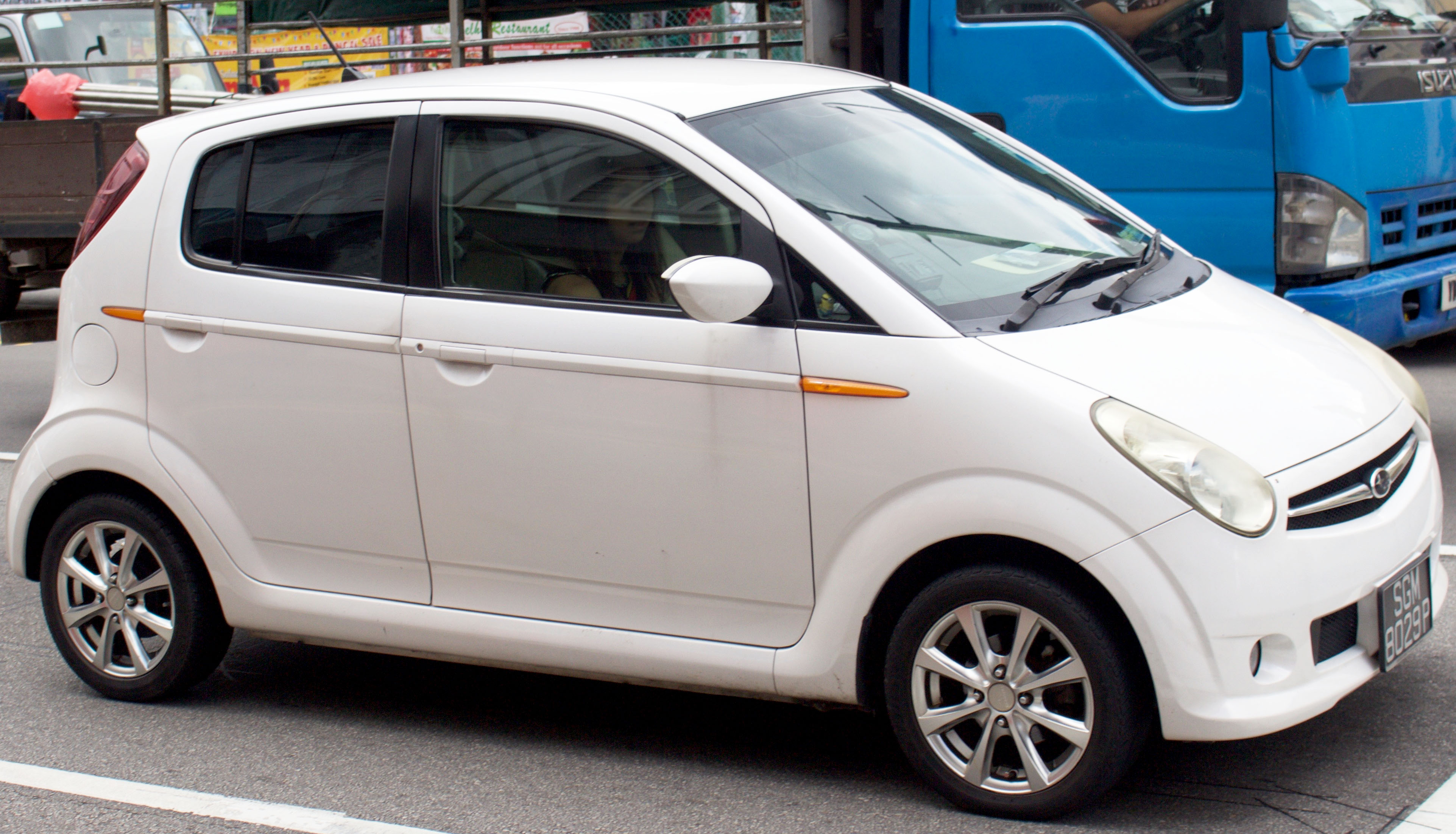

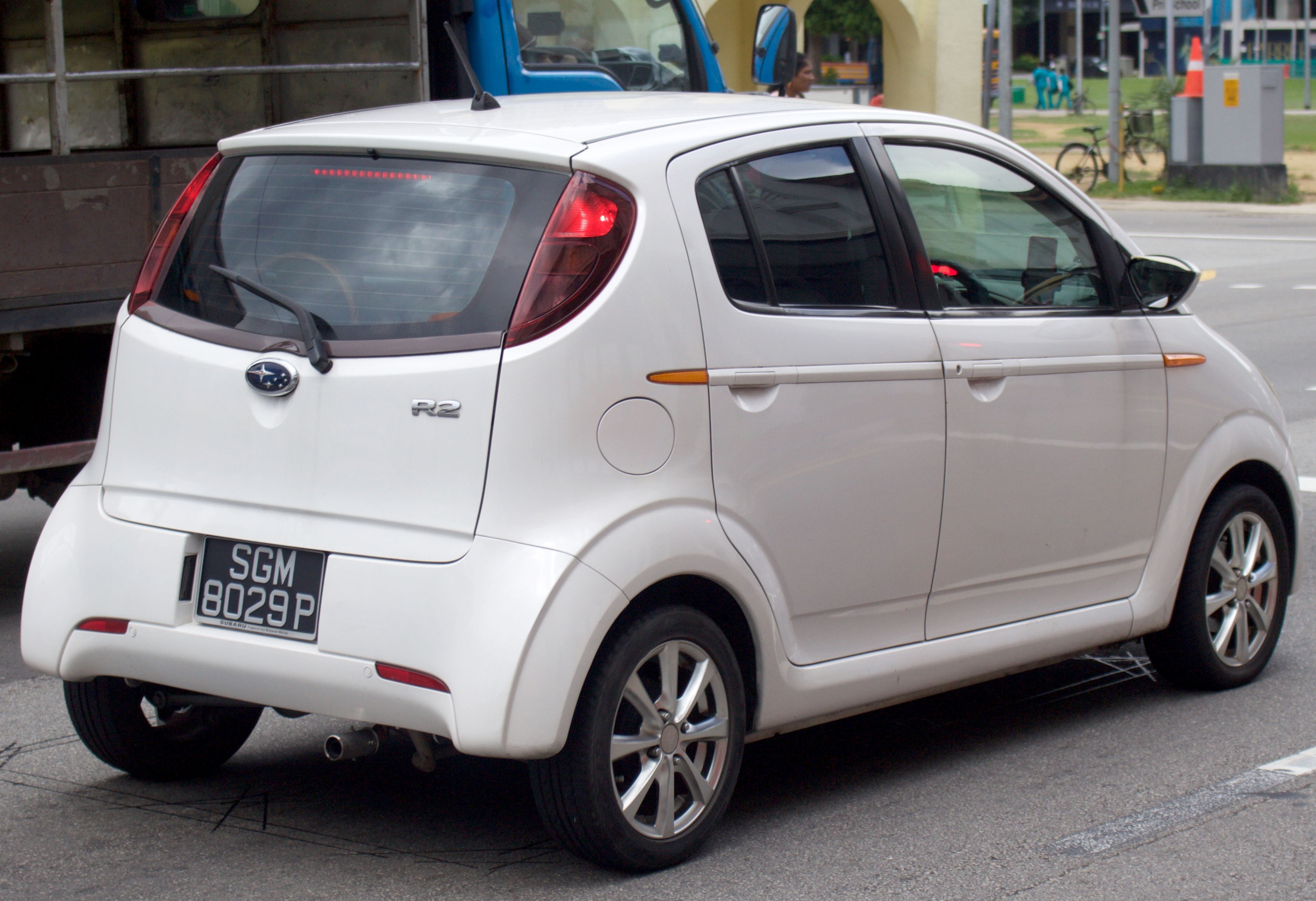
Facelift Subaru R2 (Singapore)

The Subaru R2 is a kei car produced and sold in Japan by Fuji Heavy Industries from 2003 to 2010. Its name was inspired by the Subaru R-2, produced from 1969 to 1972. The R2 was discontinued in 2010.

== Design ==
The R2 was the first production Subaru to sport a new family look, including the aviation-inspired "spread wings grille" also used by their Tribeca and Impreza.

The R2's exterior dimensions are largely similar to its predecessor, the Subaru Pleo; but unlike the squarish Pleo, the R2 has a deliberately rounded, less space-efficient form.

Three variations of the 4-cylinder 658 cc engine were available:

- SOHC
- DOHC AVCS (variable valve timing)
- DOHC with supercharger and intercooler (R2 Type S)

Unlike other Subaru models which used boxer engines, the R2 used an inline engine.

The two lower engine options were available with either a manual transmission or a CVT. The supercharged engine was coupled to a sportshift version of the CVT ("7 speed iCVT"). Both front wheel drive and all wheel drive were available.

Initially, the R2 was available in 11 colors and 3 trim levels (one for each engine variation).

On January 4, 2005, the Subaru R1 was introduced, which was a 2-door version of the R2 with a shorter body and wheelbase. In November 2005, the R2 got a facelift, replacing the spread wings grille with one similar to the Subaru Legacy.
