= Subaru TransCare =

Subaru Transcare is a range of modifications available for Subaru vehicles to enable their use by elderly or disabled persons. The company featured this range at the 38th Tokyo Motor Show, 2004, under the slogan "Open all roads: Vehicles for broadening opportunities and enriching life".

Available modifications include:

- Hand controls enable drivers to perform braking and acceleration by hand
- Seats that turn outwards, extend beyond the door frame and lower automatically with a wireless remote control
- Automatic wheelchair loading with a lift that lowers to ground level and automatic sliding door
- Additional belt across the chest to prevent the person from falling forward during stops
- Lowered floors with steps that automatically come out when the door is opened
- Ambulance style rear gurney loading with rails and bracing facilities

Transcare modifications are available for the Legacy, Sambar, Impreza, Forester, R1 and R2.
