= Subaru G4e =

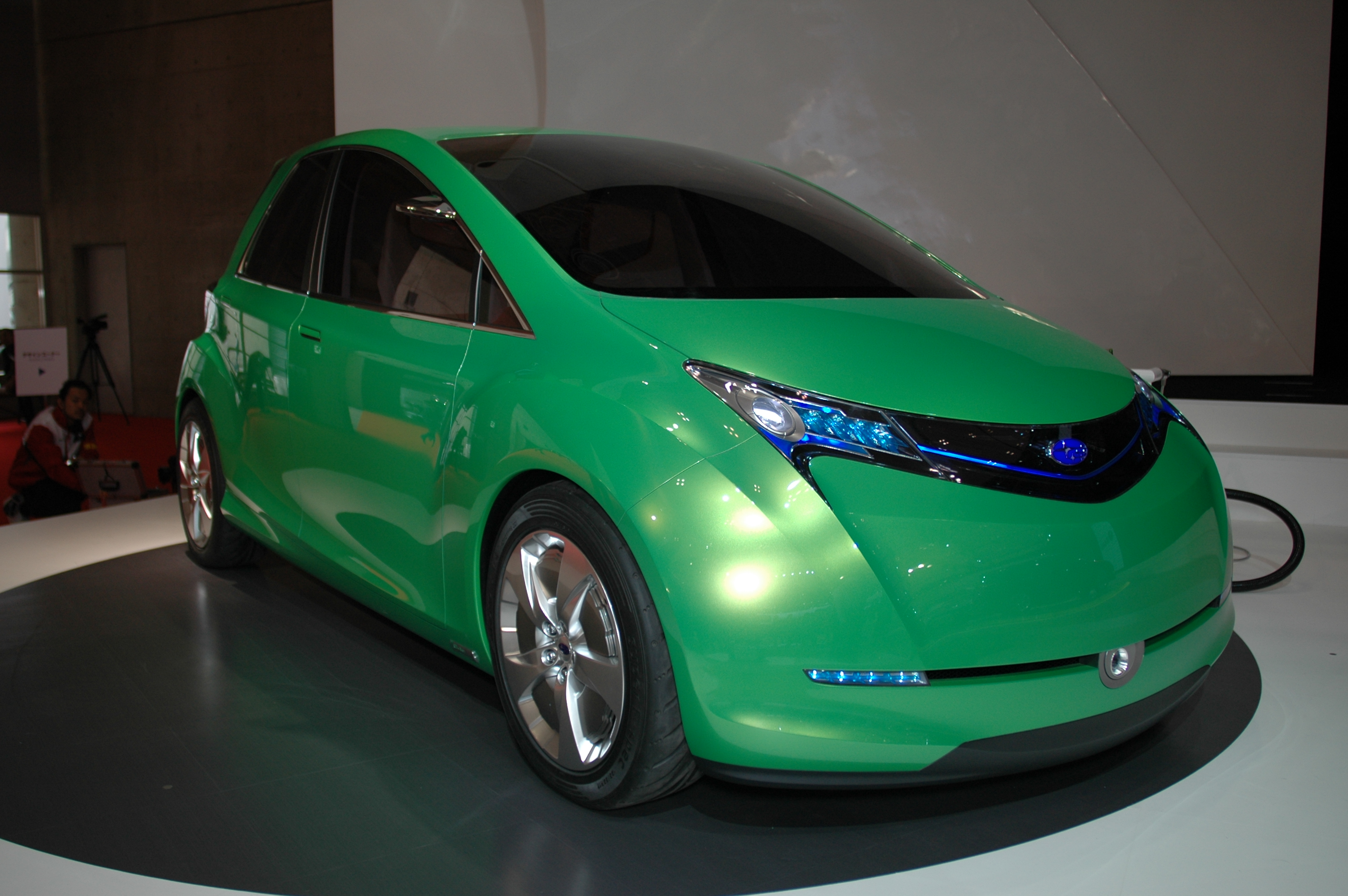
- G4e at TMS 2007

Overview
- Manufacturer: Fuji Heavy Industries

Body and chassis
- Body style: 5-door hatch

Powertrain
- Electric motor: 65 kW (87 hp; 88 PS)
- Battery: 16× vanadium lithium-ion cells, 21.6V each
- Electric range: 200 km (120 mi)

Dimensions
- Wheelbase: 2,642 mm (104 in)
- Length: 3,988 mm (157 in)
- Width: 1,702 mm (67 in)

Chronology
- Predecessor: Subaru R1e

The Subaru G4e is a concept electric car developed by Japanese automaker Subaru in conjunction with Tokyo utility TEPCO as a possible successor to the R1e. It was unveiled at the 2007 Tokyo Motor Show.

== Design ==
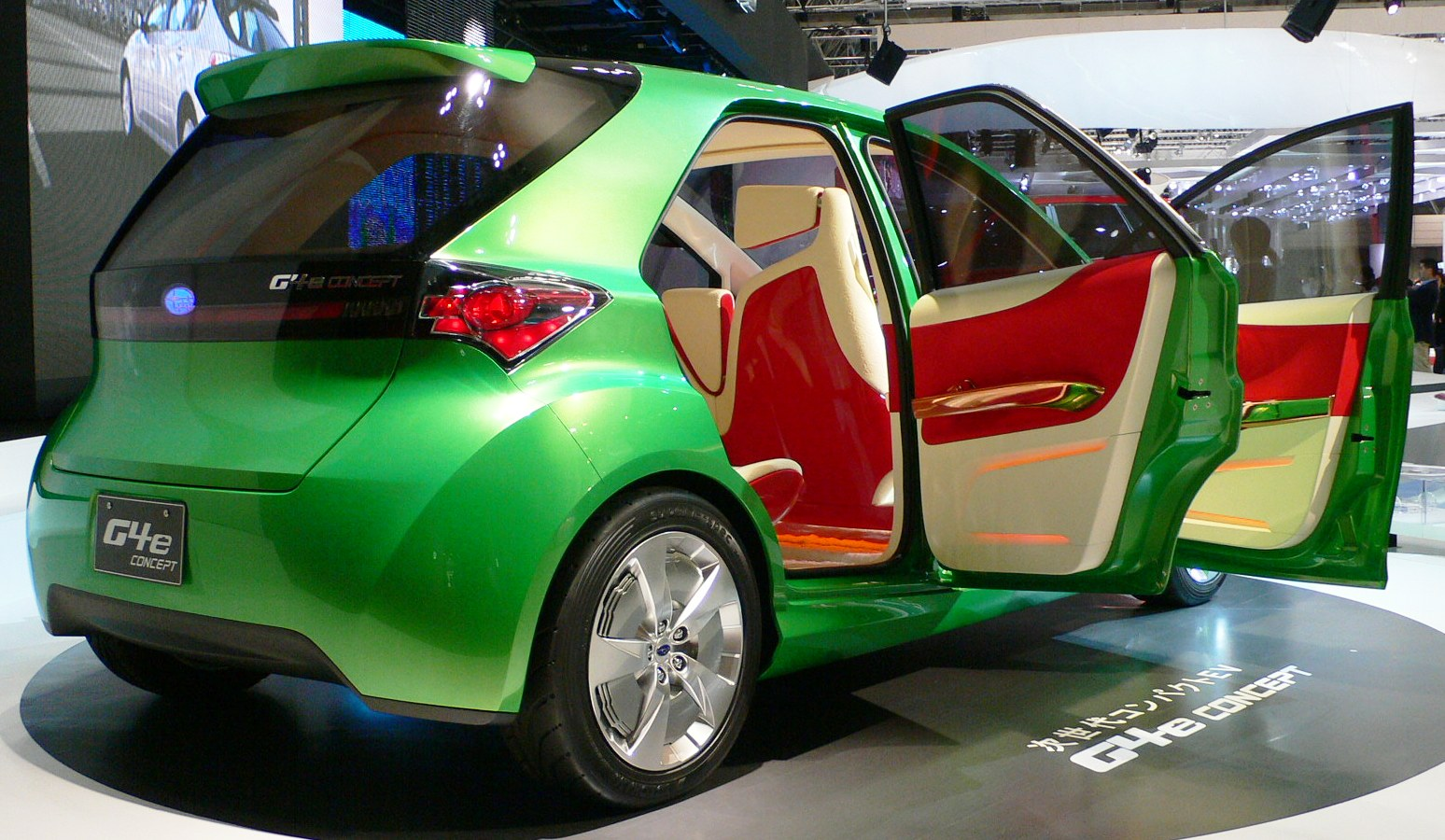
Four doors and a red-and-white interior

The G4e name is intended to stand for "Green for the Earth." The car seats five and has a wedge design with a low 0.276 drag coefficient, aided by the deletion of wing mirrors in favor of a-pillar mounted rearview cameras. Batteries are stored under the floor to maximize passenger space. The interior is trimmed in red and white, with a dashboard incorporating a large video screen in the center stack intended to be reminiscent of a waterfall.

== Technical ==
It has a range of 200 kilometres (120 mi) and can be fully charged in about eight hours from a home AC power source. A quick charge to 80 per cent of the batteries' capacity is possible in just 15 minutes.

Subaru vanadium lithium-ion battery

The G4e uses a lithium-ion battery developed exclusively by Subaru which employs vanadium technology to allow the battery to store two to three times more lithium ions than conventional lithium-ion batteries. The car's battery pack provides 346 volts.
