= Subaru Tribeca =

Subaru Tribeca (WX)
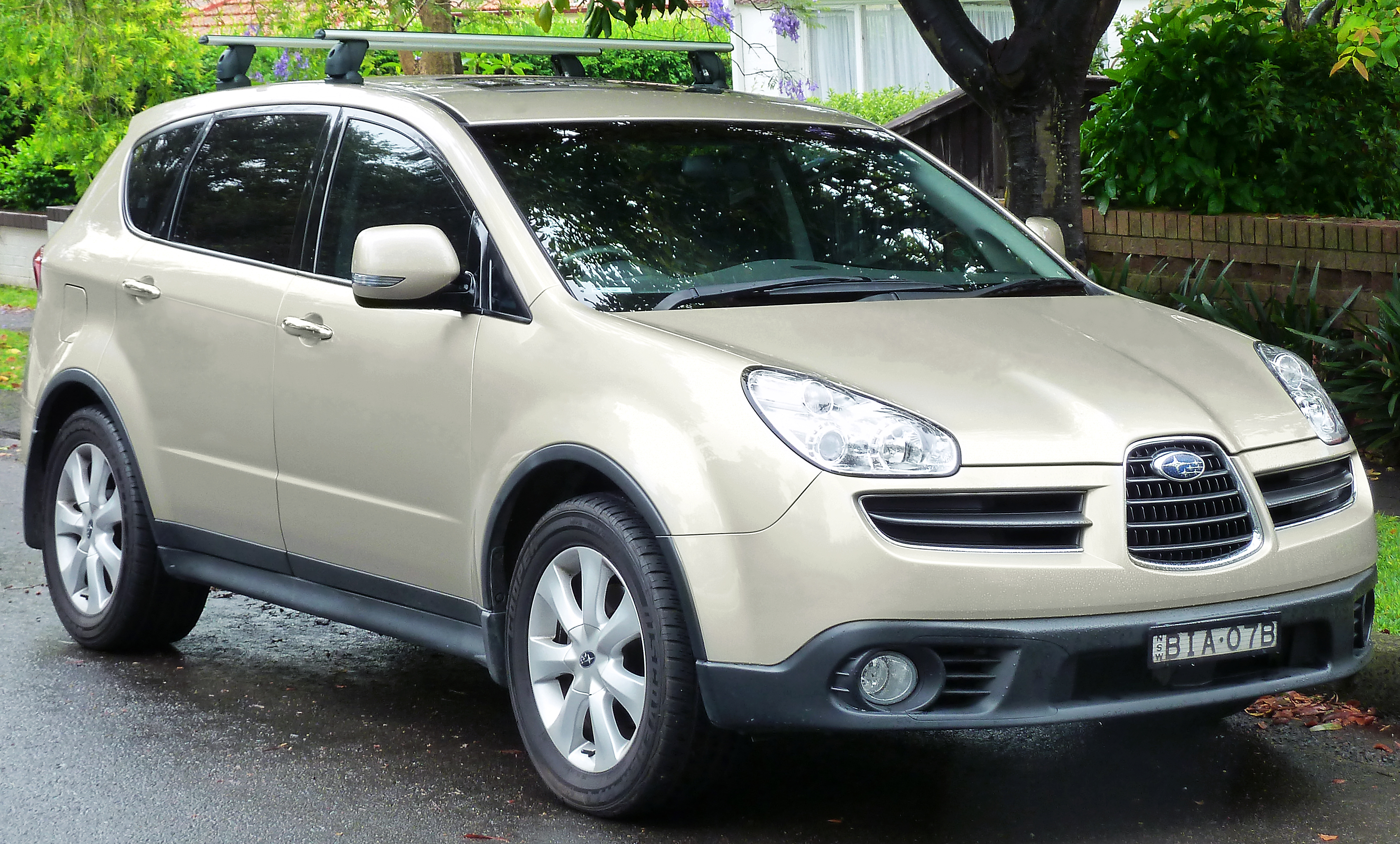

Overview
- Manufacturer: Subaru (Fuji Heavy Industries)
- Also called: Subaru B9 Tribeca (2006–2007); Saab 9-6X (cancelled)
- Production: 2005–2014
- Model years: 2006–2014
- Assembly: United States: Lafayette, Indiana (SIA)
- Designer: Erwin Leo Himmel

Body and chassis
- Class: Mid-size crossover SUV
- Body style: 5-door SUV
- Layout: Front-engine, four-wheel drive

Powertrain
- Engine: 3.0 L EZ30 H6 (2006–2007); 3.6 L EZ36 H6 (2008–2014)
- Transmission: 5-speed automatic

Dimensions
- Wheelbase: 108.2 in (2,748 mm)
- Length: 189.8 in (4,821 mm); (2006–2007); 191.5 in (4,864 mm); (2008–2014)
- Width: 73.9 in (1,877 mm)
- Height: 66.5 in (1,689 mm); (2006–2007); 66.4 in (1,687 mm) &; 67.7 in (1,720 mm); (2008–2014)
- Curb weight: 1,925 kg (4,245 lb)

Chronology
- Successor: Subaru Exiga (Southeast Asia & Australia); Subaru Ascent (North America)

The Subaru Tribeca is a mid-size crossover SUV manufactured and marketed by Subaru for model years 2005-2014. Released in some markets, including Canada, as the Subaru B9 Tribeca, the name derived from the Tribeca neighborhood of New York City. Built on the Subaru Legacy platform and sold in five- and seven-seat configurations, the Tribeca was intended to be sold alongside a slightly revised version known as the Saab 9-6X. Saab, at the time a subsidiary of General Motors (GM), abandoned the 9-6X program just prior to its release subsequent to GM's 2005 divestiture of its 20 percent stake in FHI.

Inspired by Subaru's B9X concept, the Tribeca's original design was criticized at launch and revised for model year 2008, and its name shortened to Tribeca in all markets.

North American markets received the Tribeca for 2006 model year 2006, and it was introduced to Australasia and Europe in late 2006. In addition to these markets, Subaru marketed the Tribeca also in South America, South Africa, China, the Middle East, and parts of Southeast Asia. It was not sold in Japan.

== History ==
Subaru presented the Tribeca as the B9X on November 5, 2004 at the South Florida Auto Show, and was renamed the B9 Tribeca in December after soliciting current and potential customer feedback. Subaru had planned on renaming all of its vehicles with a "B" (standing for "boxer") and a number corresponding to where they were in its lineup. "Tribeca" was added so that "Subaru [could] leverage the vested equity already associated with the progressive style, art, and culture that the name TRIBECA represents," according to Subaru President and CEO Kyoji Takenaka. The Tribeca made its worldwide debut at the North American International Auto Show in January 2005 and was scheduled to go on sale in early summer 2005 for the 2006 model year, with production at the SIA plant in Lafayette, Indiana supplying vehicles for sale in the United States, Canada, Australia and Chile. Reviewers from the Guardian and drive.com.au described it as a "soft-roader".

=== 2005–2007 ===
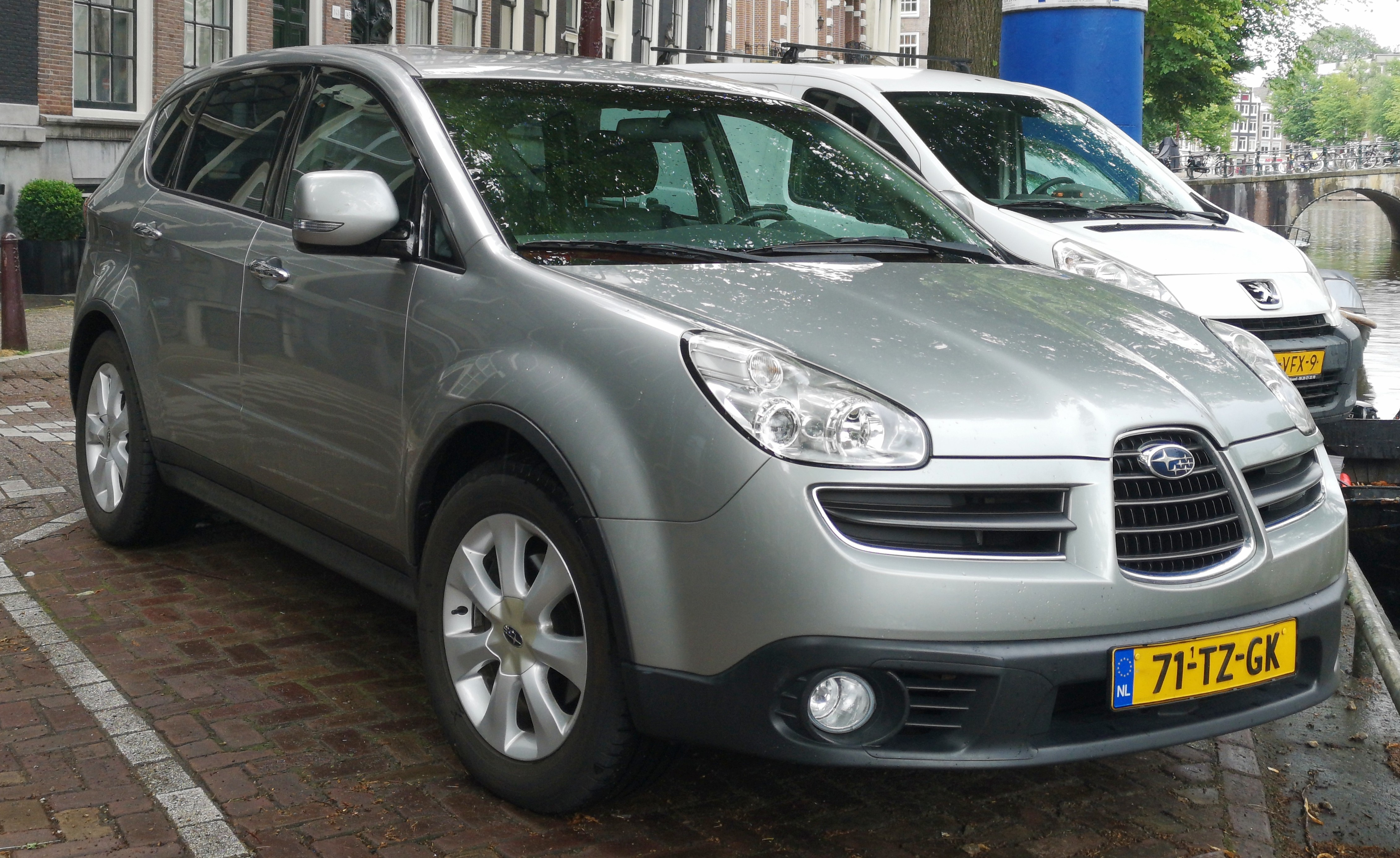

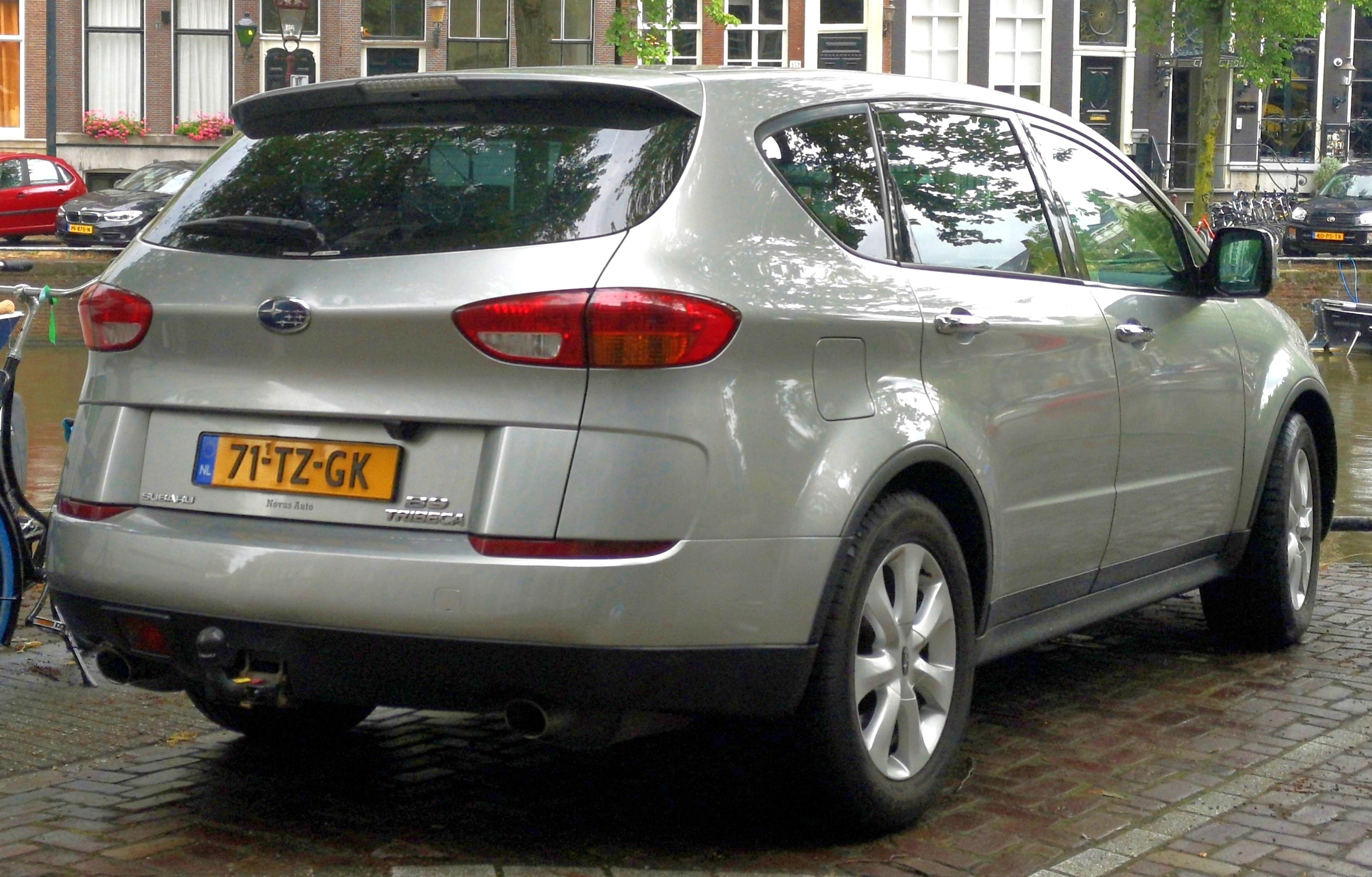
Subaru B9 Tribeca (pre-facelift)

Subaru designed the B9 Tribeca with a roughly triangular grille and a rounded body shape, mirroring the styling of the Impreza, and the Japanese market Subaru R1 and R2 kei car products. As this proved controversial, all future Subaru redesigns abandoned this design language as well as the "B" naming scheme. The Guardian said the Tribeca "could even be deemed handsome, if you like this kind of thing" before elaborating on "the sheer embarrassment of its scale in a suburban setting", calling it a "bungalow-size, high-riding suburban 4x4".

The grille design and aviation theme was initially conceived and applied to the earlier B11S and B9 Scrambler concept vehicles by Fuore Design, an independent design consulting firm based in Spain. The grille design was reportedly "meant to convey parent-company Fuji Heavy Industries' glorious history in aviation". While the exterior design was largely complete prior to the arrival of Subaru designer Andreas Zapatinas, Zapatinas and his team were responsible for the design of the interior, and the dashboard in particular.

The Tribeca was initially powered by the 3.0-liter EZ30 boxer engine paired with a five-speed automatic transmission.

The Tribeca was slightly reworked in 2006 for the 2007 model year. The updated model, first shown at the Chicago Auto Show, included a revised grille, struts, stabilizer bars, and spring rates. Inside, XM Satellite Radio and iPod connectors were provided. A backup camera and parking assist system were optional for the navigation system. A "Special Edition" package included a mesh grille, XM radio, and unique wheels.

=== Saab 9-6X ===
External image
- Saab 9-6

Saab had plans to retail a version of the Tribeca, to be called the "9-6X," but the plans stopped in 2005 when Saab's parent company GM sold its 20 percent stake in FHI, part of which was acquired by Toyota. The 9-6X would have been built alongside the Tribeca at the SIA factory in the United States. Saab revised their plans to replace the 9-7X after a short two-year lifespan, and instead the Oldsmobile Bravada-based body-on-frame SUV continued production until the 2009 model year.

Saab withheld its version of Tribeca from the public until a prototype 9-6X was added to the Saab museum in Trollhättan in July 2011, with nearly the same interior as the contemporary B9 Tribeca. Many of the exterior styling tweaks (including the front fenders) from the unreleased Saab 9-6X were used for the model year 2008 facelift, which was released relatively quickly after the original model's release.

=== 2007–2014 ===
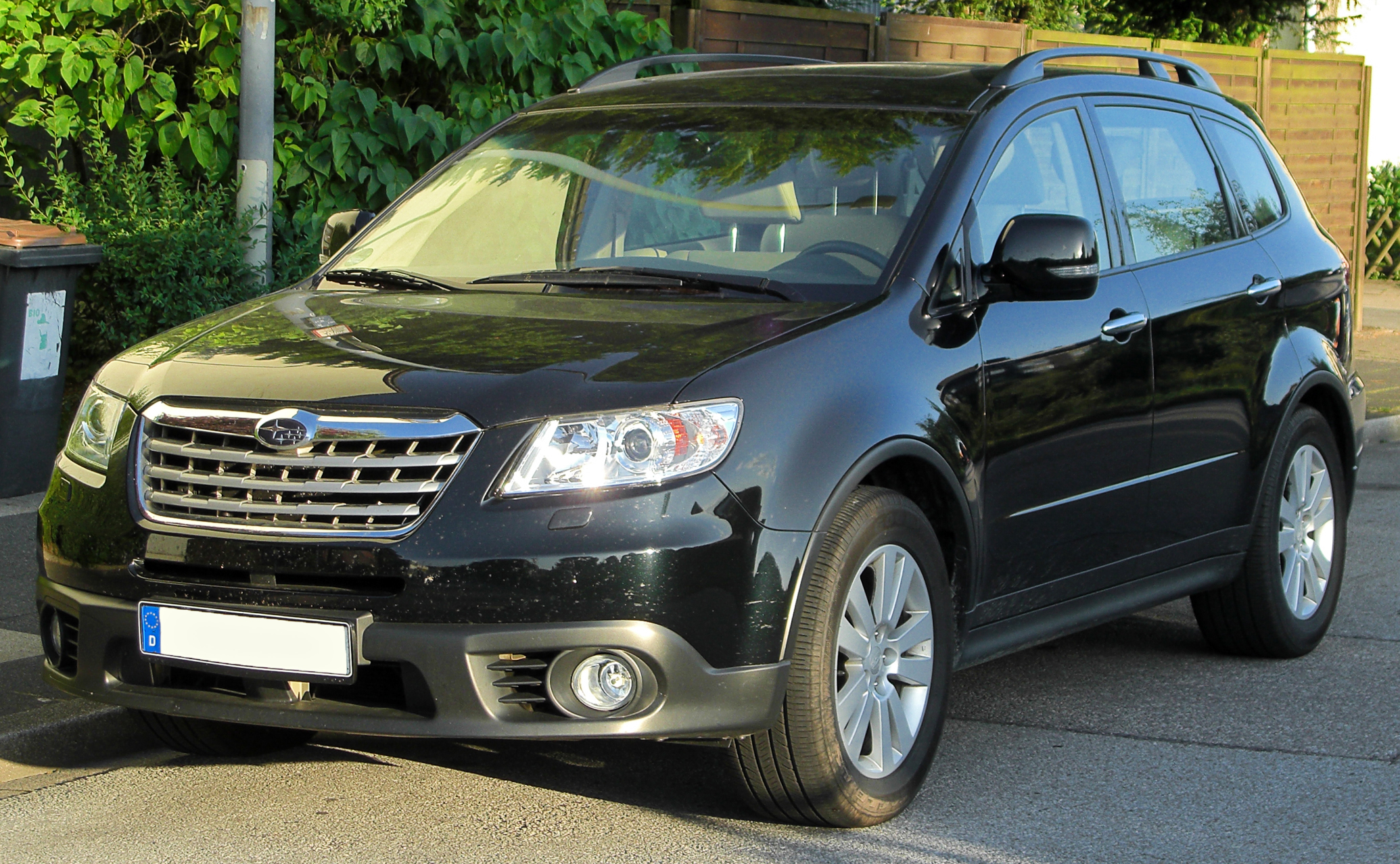

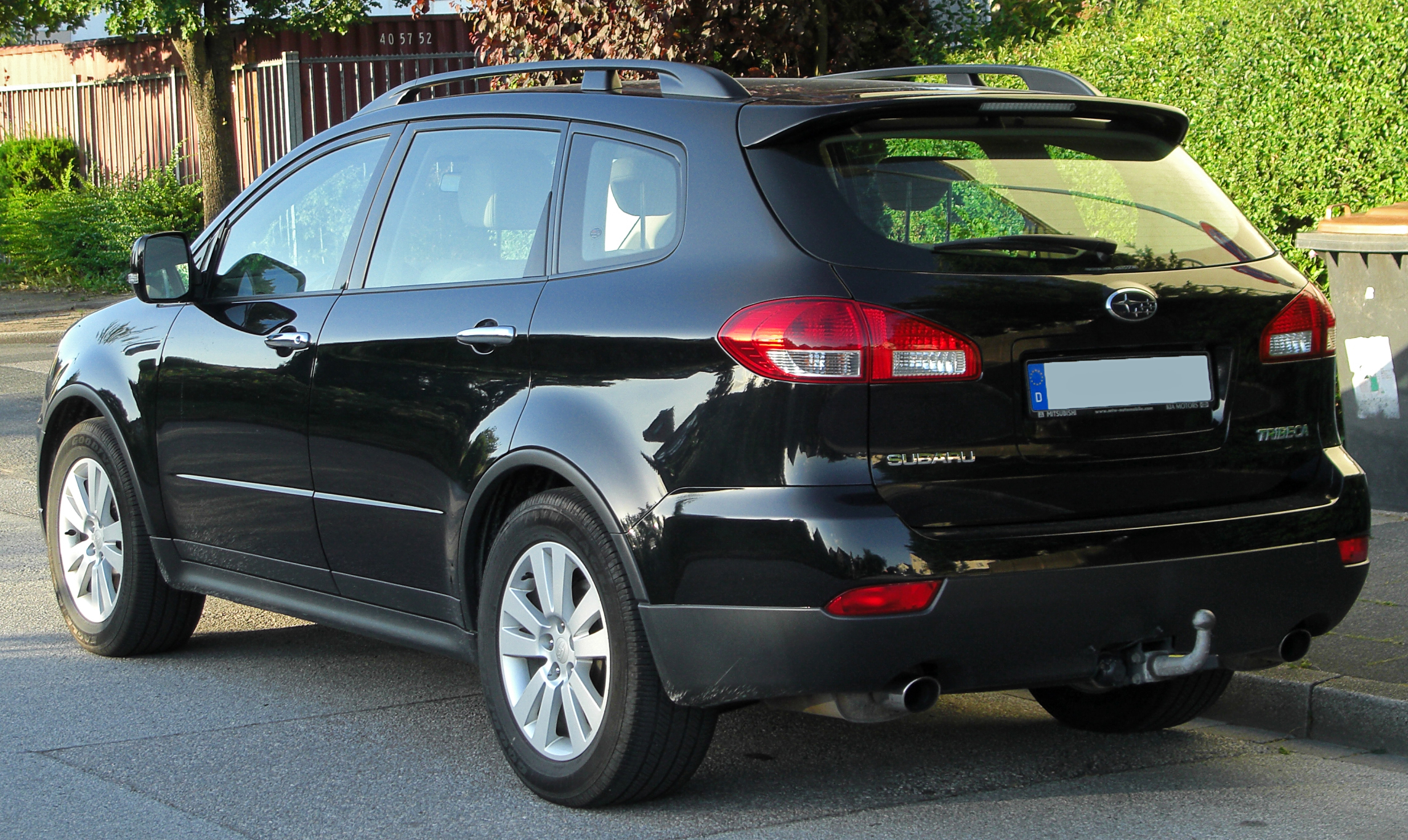
Facelift (2007)

Subaru released the 2008 models at the New York International Auto Show in April 2007 with a facelift and a larger 3.6-liter EZ36 flat-six engine rated at 191 kilowatts (256 hp). Subaru claimed 10 percent better fuel economy while using regular-grade gasoline; the 2006 and 2007 models require premium. At the same time, Subaru dropped the "B9" identifier, renaming the vehicle the "Subaru Tribeca" in all markets where it was offered. The rear of the vehicle was also mildly redesigned with more rounded taillamps, a restyled hatch, and the rearmost side window reshaped. Interior styling was unchanged, but the second row seats were redesigned for more room and easier access to the third row.

== Safety ==
ANCAP test results* Subaru Tribeca variant(s) as tested (2006)
Test	Score
Overall	5 /5 stars
Frontal offset	13.07/16
Side impact	16/16
Pole	2/2
Seat belt reminders	2/3
Whiplash protection	Not Assessed
Pedestrian protection	Marginal
Electronic stability control	Standard

== Market ==
=== North America ===
North American market Tribecas offered two trim levels— Base and Limited, the latter added a moonroof, leather interior, roof rails for enhanced cargo carrying and a premium audio system with six-disc in-dash CD changer. The interior colors were somewhat limited to either light ("Desert Beige") or dark ("Slate Gray"), both colors finished in either cloth (on the base model) or leather (exclusive to the Limited model) trim. For the leather-trimmed models, no interior color choice was available; due to the interior color being determined by the exterior color. In 2007, the beige cloth trim was dropped and the base model was now only available in just two exterior colors. The North American market 2006 to 2007 year model B9 Tribeca also had smaller wing mirrors that were upgraded to the larger European market mirrors starting in model year 2008.

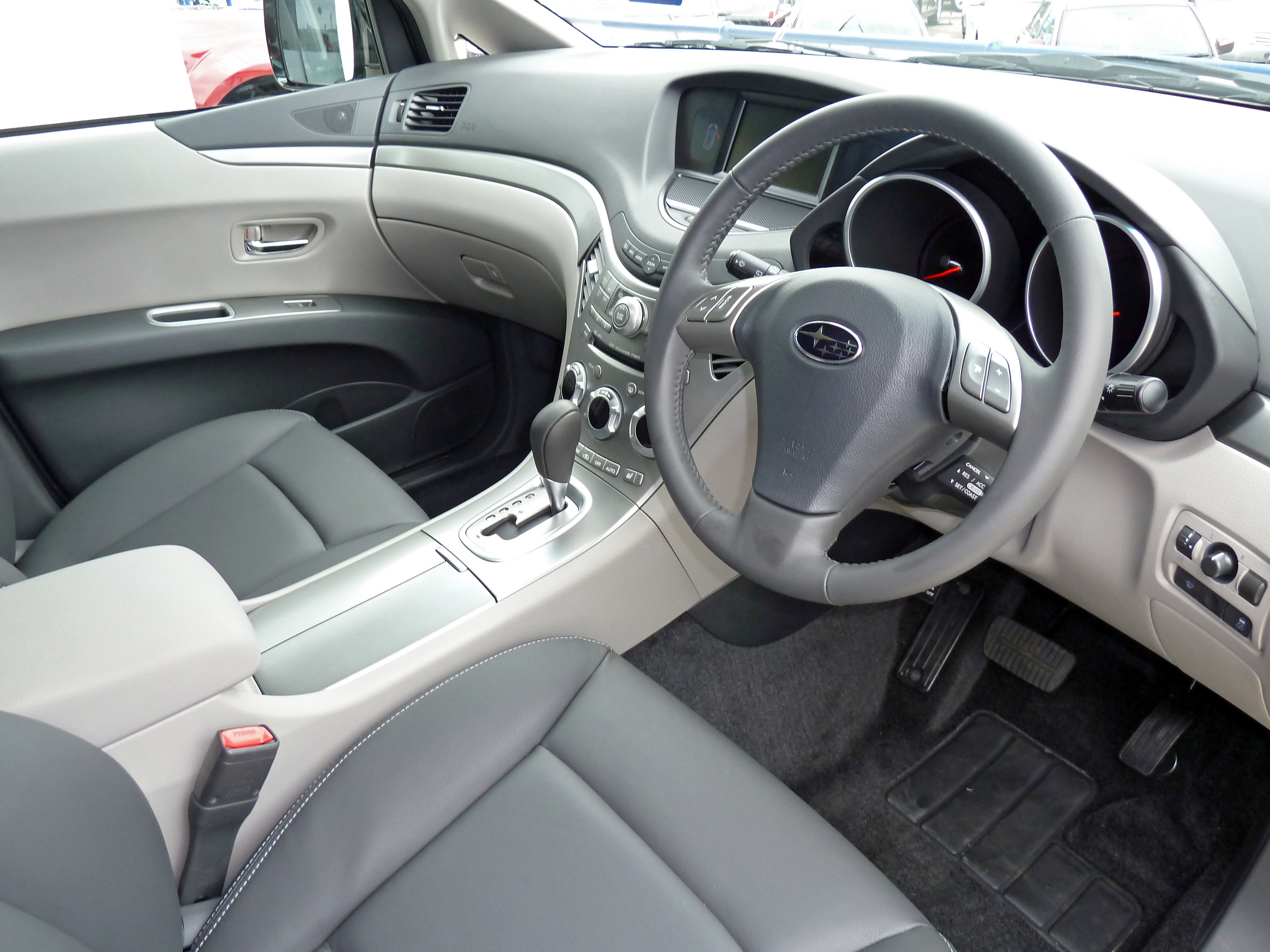
Subaru Tribeca interior

The Limited trim level included an in-dash multifunction screen that displayed audio system information, trip computer functions, and outside temperatures. When equipped with the navigation package, the screen added navigation system information, maintenance intervals, controls for various vehicle settings, calendar, calculator and memo-taking functions. An alternate rear-seat DVD entertainment system and navigation package was available on models with a third-row seat, which added a video input from the rear-seat DVD entertainment system which could only be displayed on the instrument panel center screen if the parking brake was engaged.

The cargo volume was 37.6 cu ft (1.06 m^{3}) with the second row seats raised and 74.4 cu ft (2.11 m^{3}) with rear seats lowered. Seating configuration remained at standard second row seats or optional third row seats.

The vehicle was equipped with six airbags; two for the front passengers, two side impact airbags that deployed from the outer edge of the front seats and side curtain airbags that dropped in front of the front and second row side doors.

Two stereo packages were offered, either a 100-watt six-speaker system with a single-disc in-dash CD player with MP3 compatibility, or (on Limited models) a premium stereo with 160-watt, nine speakers with subwoofer and a six-disc in-dash CD changer, also MP3 compatible. Both stereos had steering wheel-mounted audio controls, and in 2007, an auxiliary audio jack was added.

In North America at the time, the Tribeca was the only vehicle in this class that comes equipped with all-wheel drive as standard equipment. In the United States, Subaru's initial television ad campaign for the Tribeca prominently featured the Kansas song "Dust in the Wind". The Tribeca won the Ward's Auto 2006 "Interior of the Year" for premium-priced crossover utility vehicles in voting from automotive industry professionals. Also, it was considered Most Innovative Concept at the 2004 Detroit Auto Show. The Tribeca scored well on Insurance Institute for Highway Safety crash tests; it earned a "Top Safety Pick" ranking.

== Drivetrain ==
Subaru chose to use an aluminum alloy horizontally opposed "boxer" engine to minimize powertrain weight and lower the center of gravity so as to reduce body roll. The weight of the engine and automatic transmission are laterally balanced instead of being offset from left to right. The power delivery is also direct from the transmission to the front wheels, and distributed to the rear axle via a "Variable Torque Distribution" system which uses a central planetary differential gear with an electronically controlled hydraulic clutch, with torque split 45% to the front axle and 55% to the rear axle under normal driving conditions. The rear wheels are driven through a rear differential, which is limited-slip on some models. The front differential is integrated into the transmission.

Sales in United States and Canada
Year	U.S. Sales	Canadian Sales
2005 (Note: Data from the final eight months of calendar year 2005)	14,797	804
2006	18,614	902
2007	16,790	801
2008	10,975	925
2009	5,930	588
2010	2,472	536
2011	2,791	460
2012	2,075	390
2013	1,598	234
2014	732	120
2015	–	5
Total	76,774	5,765
Notes:

The boxer design also provides near-perfect vibration mitigation because the movement of each piston is exactly countered by the corresponding piston in the opposing cylinder bank, eliminating the need for a counterbalance shaft, and that the movement of the pistons is on a horizontal plane. The only vibration caused by the boxer engine is secondary caused by the cylinders being slightly offset on opposing banks. This vibration, however, is minimal and is largely absorbed by rubber engine mounts. Torque steer is also reduced with this type of power train layout. This is achieved by having the front driveshafts being of equal weight and length, and extend from the transmission to the front wheels at almost perpendicular from the transmission.

The 2006 Tribeca was initially rated at 18 mpg_{‑US} (13 L/100 km; 22 mpg_{‑imp}) using the EPA city cycle and 23 mpg_{‑US} (10 L/100 km; 28 mpg_{‑imp}) on the EPA highway cycle. Using the revised EPA driving cycle, the consumption increased to 16 mpg_{‑US} (15 L/100 km; 19 mpg_{‑imp}) city and 21 mpg_{‑US} (11 L/100 km; 25 mpg_{‑imp}) highway, with combined consumption at 18 mpg_{‑US} (13 L/100 km; 22 mpg_{‑imp}) for both the original (3.0-litre engine) and revised (3.6-litre engine) models.

== Discontinuation ==
Subaru announced in January 2012 that the Subaru Tribeca would stop being sold in the US and Australia, and that its production would end in December 2012. On October 18, 2013, Autoblog, Jalopnik, and Cars.com all confirmed that Subaru informed its dealers that production on the Tribeca would end in January 2014 due to slow sales.

Subaru sold just under 77,000 Tribecas total in the United States, making it one of the worst-selling vehicles in the US in 2011 and 2012. Only 1,247 Tribecas were sold in the first nine months of 2013, and placed seventh among the worst-selling vehicles in the United States for the 2013 model year with only 1,598 units sold, down 23% from 2012.

The discontinuation came as Subaru was looking at replacing the vehicle with an upscale 7-seat crossover SUV, possibly based on the Subaru Exiga, that would have competed against the Ford Explorer and Nissan Pathfinder. The replacement vehicle had been in the planning stages in an effort to attract new buyers without alienating current ones.

Subaru stated in April 2015 that the next-generation Exiga Crossover 7 for the Japanese market would not be offered in North America because of its size, and instead a larger Tribeca successor that could be built in the United States was being studied. At the 2017 LA Auto Show, Subaru revealed the Subaru Ascent, a new mid-size, crossover SUV, set to be the replacement for the Tribeca in North America in Summer 2018.
