= Subaru R1e =

Overview
- Manufacturer: Fuji Heavy Industries

Body and chassis
- Body style: 3-door hatch

Powertrain
- Electric motor: 40 kW (54 hp; 54 PS)
- Battery: laminated manganese lithium-ion
- Electric range: 80 km (50 mi)

Dimensions
- Length: 3,285 mm (129.3 in)
- Width: 1,475 mm (58.1 in)
- Height: 1,510 mm (59.4 in)

Chronology
- Successor: Subaru G4e

The Subaru R1e was a battery-electric microcar produced by Fuji Heavy Industries (FHI), first shown at the 2003 Tokyo Motor Show. The concept was jointly developed to prototype form with Tokyo Electric Power (TEPCO), the giant Japanese utility company. At least 40 prototypes were built by FHI and tested by TEPCO and the New York Power Authority. The vehicle had a range of 80 kilometres (50 mi) and a top speed of 100 km/h (62 mph).

== History ==
The 2003 concept vehicle was a three-door hatchback with 2+2 seating. The later R1 Japanese-market micro shared the styling and chassis with the R1e and was exhibited as a prototype at the 2004 Tokyo Motor Show, one year after the R1e concept. The R1 adopted a "one-motion form" with "a flowing eggshell shape" that "effectively absorb[ed] crash impact". It was styled with the same grille as the 1st generation B9 Tribeca, which had been introduced earlier in 2003 as a signature corporate look on the B11S concept vehicle. The R1e would go on to be exhibited at Geneva in early 2004 before Subaru announced the R1 micro would enter regular production for 2005 as a conventionally-powered gasoline vehicle.

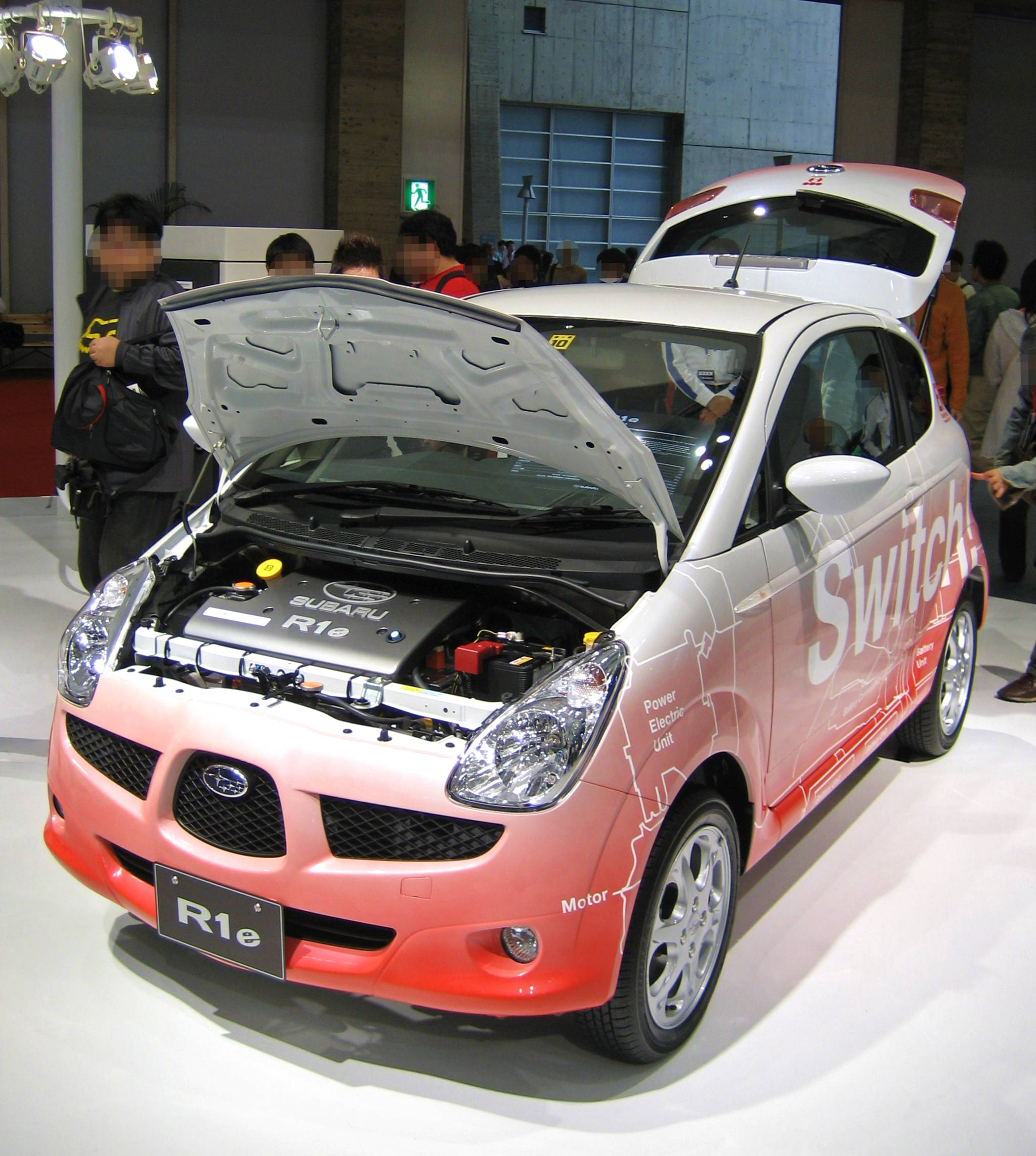
Subaru R1e

In 2005, FHI and TEPCO announced a joint project to develop ten prototype vehicles based on the R1e concept. Under the agreement, FHI was responsible for vehicle production and monitoring performance under daily use to optimize cost, battery capacity, and vehicle weight. TEPCO was responsible for developing a rapid electric charger. The performance goals were for a daily driving range of 80 km (50 mi) and a charger capable of restoring the battery to 80% of full capacity within fifteen minutes. Compared with the concept, the prototypes had their seats reduced to 2. Prototypes were manufactured at the Subaru Technical Research Center in Mitaka, Tokyo, and were scheduled to be delivered to TEPCO between October 2005 and March 2006. The delivered prototypes received intense interest from electric vehicle fans owing to their modern lithium-ion battery technology, appropriate size, and potential performance attributes.

The R1e was exhibited at Detroit in January 2006, billed as "the ideal ecology car" and touting its use of a lithium-ion battery pack, featuring rapid charging and low maintenance. FHI, TEPCO, and NEC Lamilion Energy (NLE) jointly received an award from the Ministry of the Environment in November 2006 for the development of the R1e. In February 2007, Subaru announced its intent to market the R1e as a city commuting car.

Subaru would go on to release the electric concept G4e at the Tokyo Motor Show in late 2007 as a follow-up to the R1e with an improved battery, range, and bolder styling. By February 2008, TEPCO was using 40 R1e electric vehicles commercially, and Subaru announced that 100 R1e vehicles would be test marketed in Japan during 2009. Two R1e electric vehicles were adopted into the New York Power Authority fleet in March 2008. The R1e's propulsion design and experience were incorporated into a plug-in Stella prototype exhibited in June 2008, and FHI announced plans to test-market electric Stella vehicles during the upcoming 2009 fiscal year.

== Technical ==
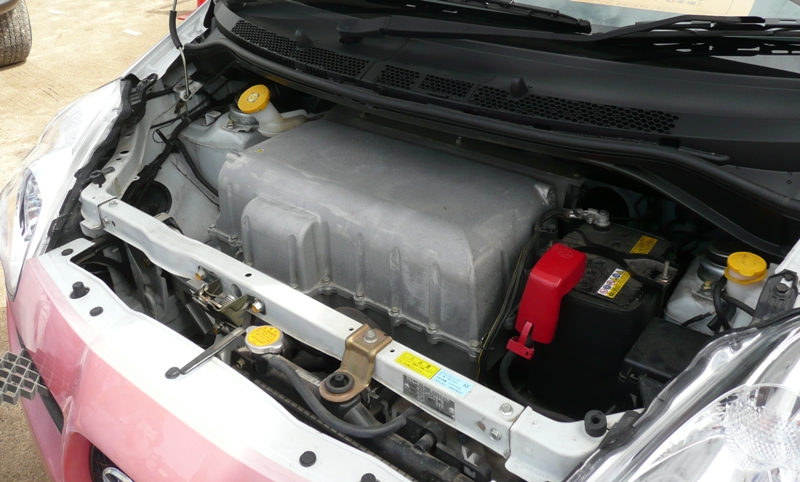
R1e underhood detail

The R1e used a laminated lithium-ion battery which was developed by NLE, a joint venture established by FHI with NEC. The design goal was for 80 kilometres (50 mi) of city driving range using a designed capacity of 8 kW-hr with a top speed of 100 km/h (62 mph), and a battery life goal of retaining at least 80% of initial capacity after seven years or 70,000 kilometres (43,000 mi).

Measured performance of the battery pack included a recharge capability to 80% capacity in eight minutes with a special rapid charger using 200 V, or to 100% charge in eight hours on a standard 100 V plug. Battery life is at least 10 years or 209,000 kilometres (130,000 mi).

TEPCO planned on producing 150 fast-charge stations.

== See also ==
- Hitachi Maxell
- Subaru R1
- Subaru G4e
