= Subaru Exiga =

Mid-size MPV

Subaru Exiga (YA)
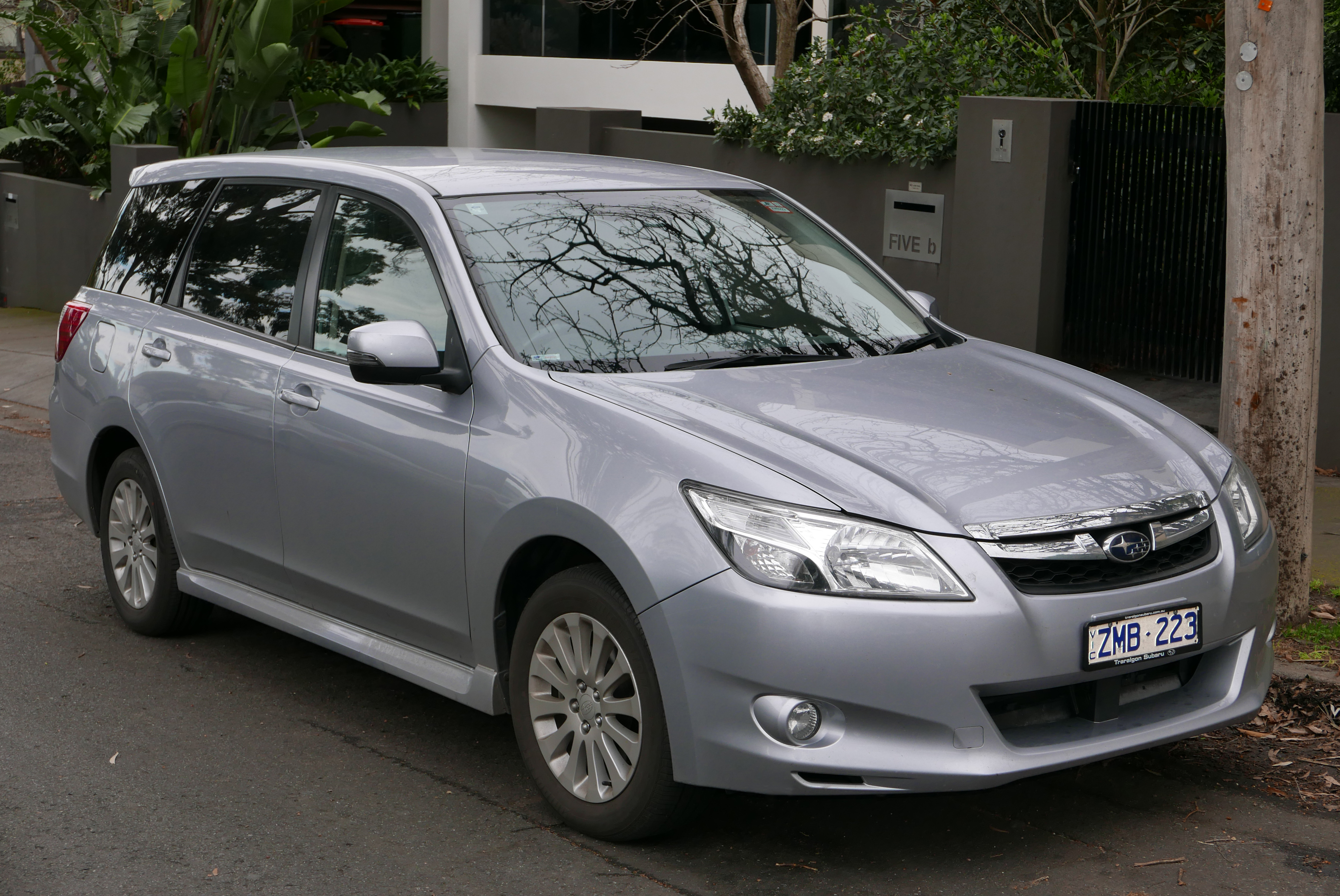
- 2012 Subaru Liberty Exiga (YA9, Australia)

Overview
- Manufacturer: Subaru
- Also called: Subaru Liberty Exiga (Australia)
- Production: June 2008 – February 2018
- Assembly: Japan: Ōta, Gunma

Body and chassis
- Class: Mid-size MPV
- Body style: 5-door wagon
- Layout: Front-engine, front-wheel-drive Front-engine, four-wheel-drive (turbo)
- Related: Subaru Legacy; Subaru Impreza

Powertrain
- Engine: 2.0 L H4 146 hp (109 kW); 2.0 L turbo 221 hp (165 kW) H4 2.5 L H4
- Transmission: 4-speed automatic 5-speed automatic Lineartronic CVT

Dimensions
- Wheelbase: 2,750 mm (108.3 in)
- Length: 4,740 mm (186.6 in)
- Width: 1,775 mm (69.9 in)
- Height: 1,660 mm (65.4 in)

Chronology
- Predecessor: Subaru Traviq (Japan); Subaru Tribeca (Southeast Asia and Australia)

The Subaru Exiga (Japanese: スバル・エクシーガ, Subaru Ekushīga) is a mid-size MPV that debuted as a concept car during the 2007 Tokyo Motor Show. According to the Japanese Subaru press introduction materials, the name "Exiga" is a neologism combination of the words "exciting" and "active". The Exiga name itself was taken from two unrelated Subaru concept cars: the Alpha Exiga from 1995 and the Exiga from 1997.

The vehicle has a supersize panoramic glass roof and theater-style seating, with rear passengers sitting a little higher than those in front. Seats in the concept vehicle were upholstered in leather and trimmed in pearl white and blue. The rear seatbacks incorporate fold-down tray tables, similar to those on airplanes.

The instrument panel in the concept vehicle offered displays from eight monitors, providing excellent visibility around the vehicle, and also housed a clear blue multi-display zone. There continues to be indirect lighting in the side doors and ceiling in the production vehicle, providing soft ambient light at night.

The engine is a 1994 cc turbocharged H4 based on the Subaru Impreza WRX coupled to Subaru's 5EAT automatic transmission used in the Subaru Legacy and Subaru Tribeca.

Subaru introduced the seven-seat wagon in the Japanese market 18 June 2008.

Subaru never sold the Exiga in North America, having opted to sell the similarly-sized Subaru Tribeca three-row crossover instead. However, the Exiga and Tribeca were sold side-by-side in both Australia and Singapore. With Subaru having ceased production of the Tribeca in 2014, it was expected that the company might bring the Exiga to North America as a replacement and entry into the seven-passenger crossover SUV market, but Subaru chose not to because of the Exiga's size and its intent to produce a Tribeca successor in the United States, called the Ascent.

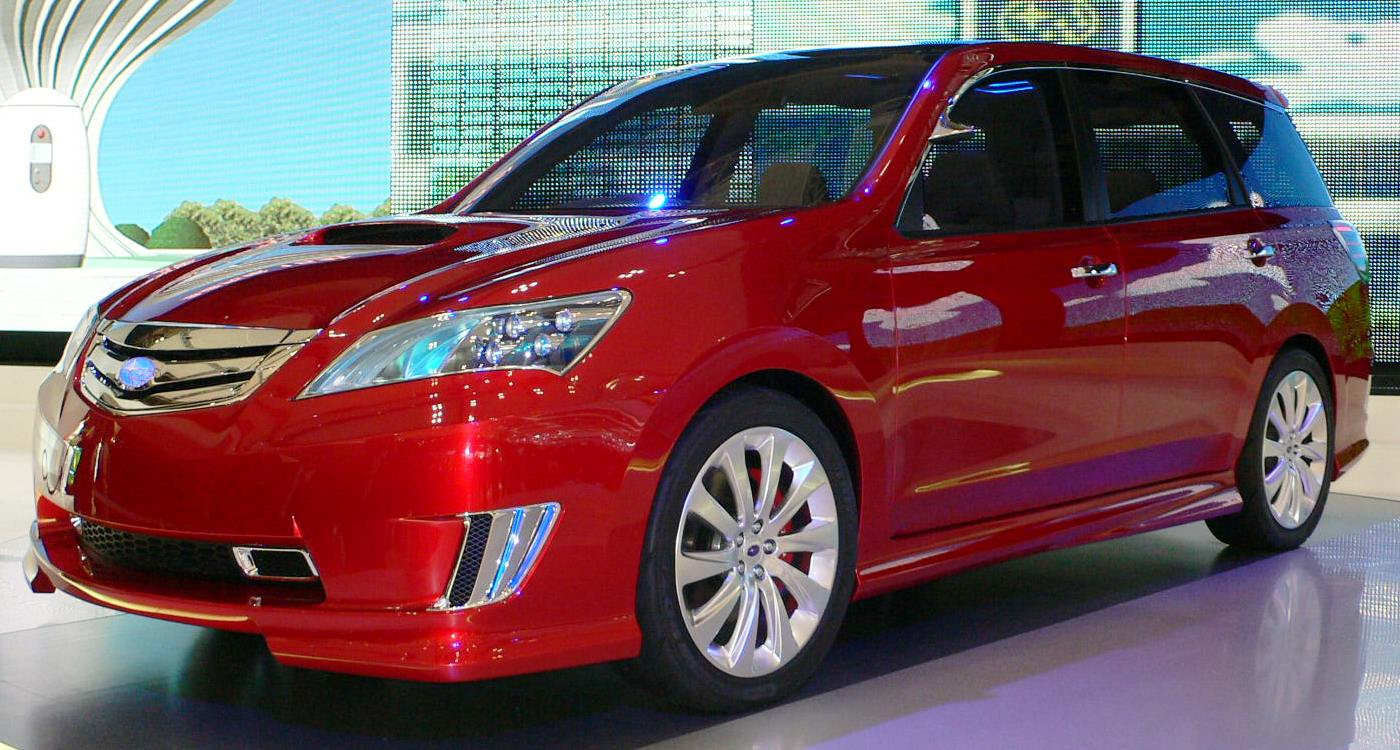
Subaru Exiga concept

== Production version ==
The Exiga was released for sale in Japan on 17 June 2008, and was built to replace the Subaru Traviq, which could also hold seven passengers in the Japanese market. It was initially sold only in Japan but Australia is the first export market outside Japan to receive it, where it is badged Subaru Liberty Exiga. Due to the exterior dimensions of the Exiga not being in compliance with Japanese Government regulations, it is not classified as a "compact MPV".

The Exiga is available in four trim options: the 2.0i is the entry level version, followed by the 2.0i-L, the 2.0i-S, all with a non-turbocharged engine, and the turbocharged 2.0GT with intercooler. The front grille and hoodscoop denotes if the engine is turbocharged; the chrome plated version is attached to vehicles without a turbo, and a metal mesh with dark plating is for the turbo. Two catalytic converters have been installed in a tandem configuration for effective emissions control. Active Torque Split transmission is used on engines without a turbo, and VTD is used with the turbo. Wheel sizes are either 16" or 17" for the turbo. For the Japanese-spec Exiga, AWD is optional on the naturally aspirated version and standard on the turbo as of 5 July 2008.

On 2 September 2009, the Lineartronic CVT transmission was available on AWD vehicles, and a driver safety aid called "EyeSight" was added as an option on the top level 2.0GT. In November 2009, a limited edition "2.0 GT tuned by STi" was released. This version had an STi front spoiler and alloy wheels, a sport muffler and tighter suspension, along with various interior upgrades such as half-leather seats and a leather-covered Momo steering wheel. Only 300 examples were built.

EyeSight consists of twin cameras, one on each side of the rear view mirror, that use human-like stereoscopic vision to judge distances and generally keep tabs on the driver. The system can help maintain a safe distance on the highway, a lane departure warning system, a driver alert warning for various safety situations, and even keeps an eye out for pedestrians. SI-Cruise has also been integrated into the EyeSight feature.

The Exiga can seat seven passengers, utilizing a gradual elevation of the seats, placing the first and second rows slightly lower than the third row. An optional, fixed position, panoramic glass roof covers the first and second rows of seats. Large rear door openings open to almost 90 degrees for easy access to the third row. The rear suspension uses double-wishbone architecture to make room for the third row and a wide luggage compartment when the second and third row seats are folded down. The second row seats can be individually slid back and forth 180 mm (7.1 in) as needed, with a one touch folding mechanism to allow access to the third row. The cargo area offers a covered stacking approach, allowing items to be placed under the floor. Two airbags are used for front passengers, supplemented with first row side impact and additional side curtain airbags protect first and second row passengers. The seats utilize anti-whiplash, impact-absorbing technology. A collapsible brake pedal is included to reduce the chance of foot injury in a severe collision. There are no air conditioning outlets for the second and third rows but the front outlet is designed to channel the air further along the ceiling of the vehicle.

Indirect blue LED lighting is installed in the overhead console, center tray and foot wells.

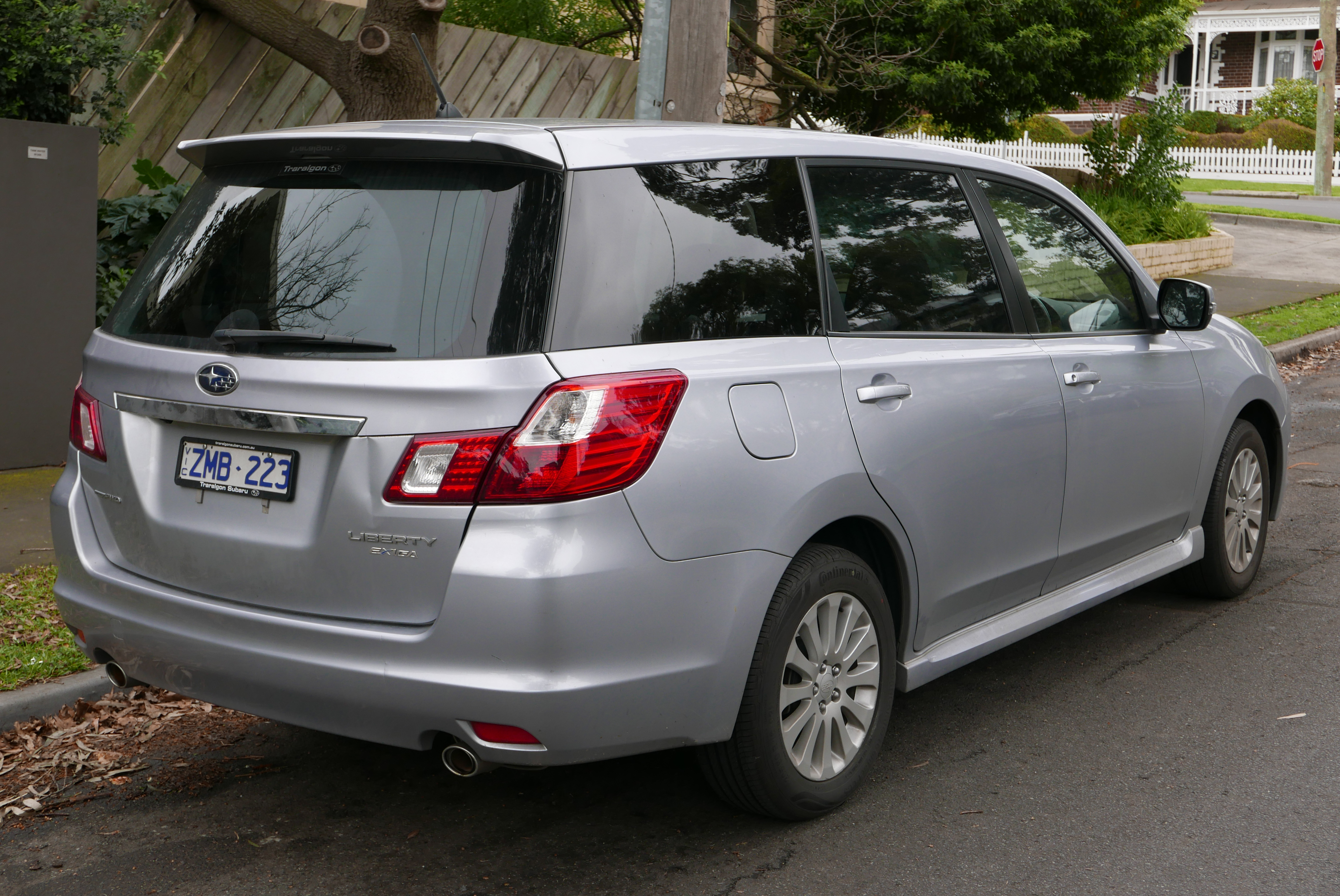
2012 Subaru Liberty Exiga (YA9, Australia)

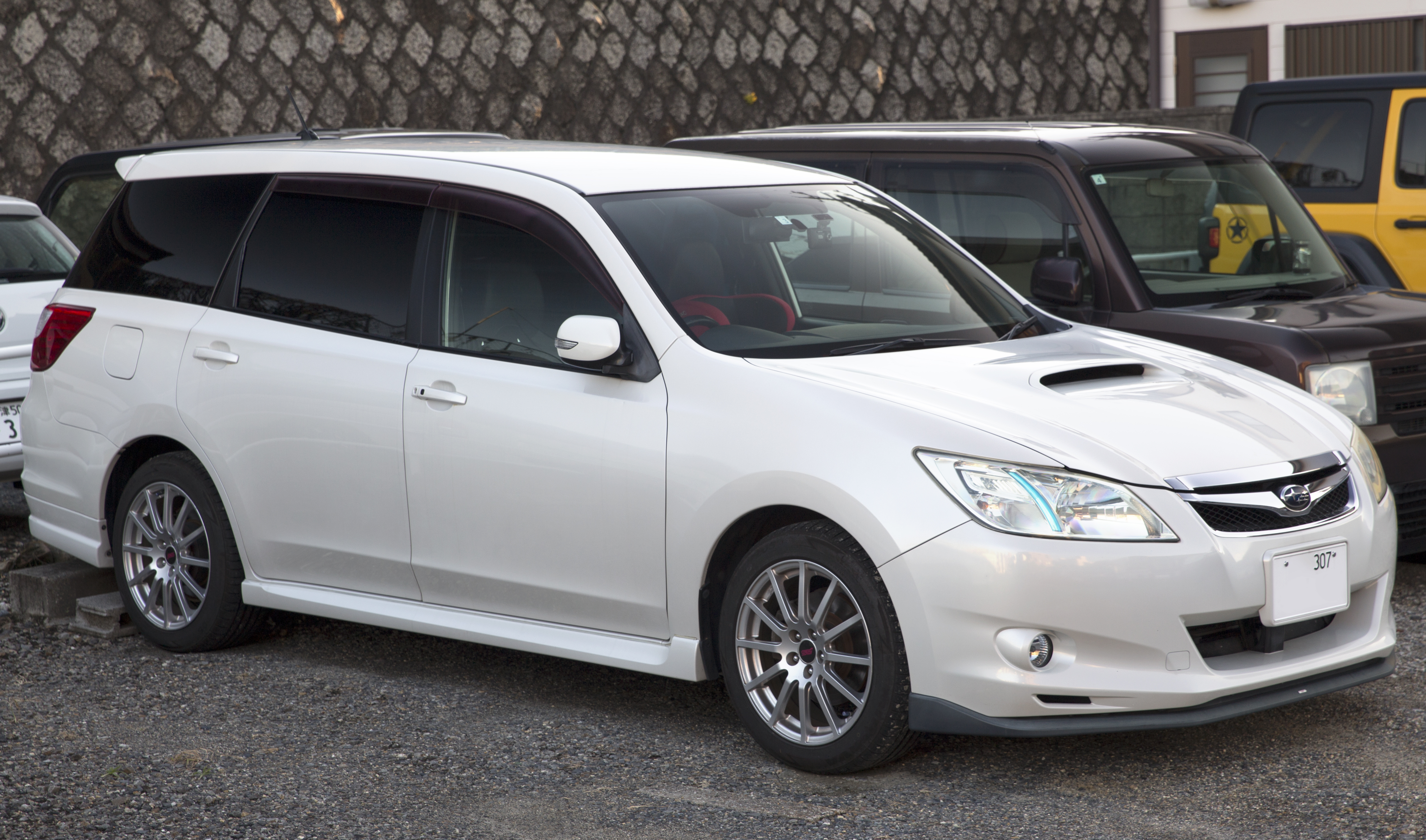
Subaru Exiga 2.0 GT tuned by STi (Japan)

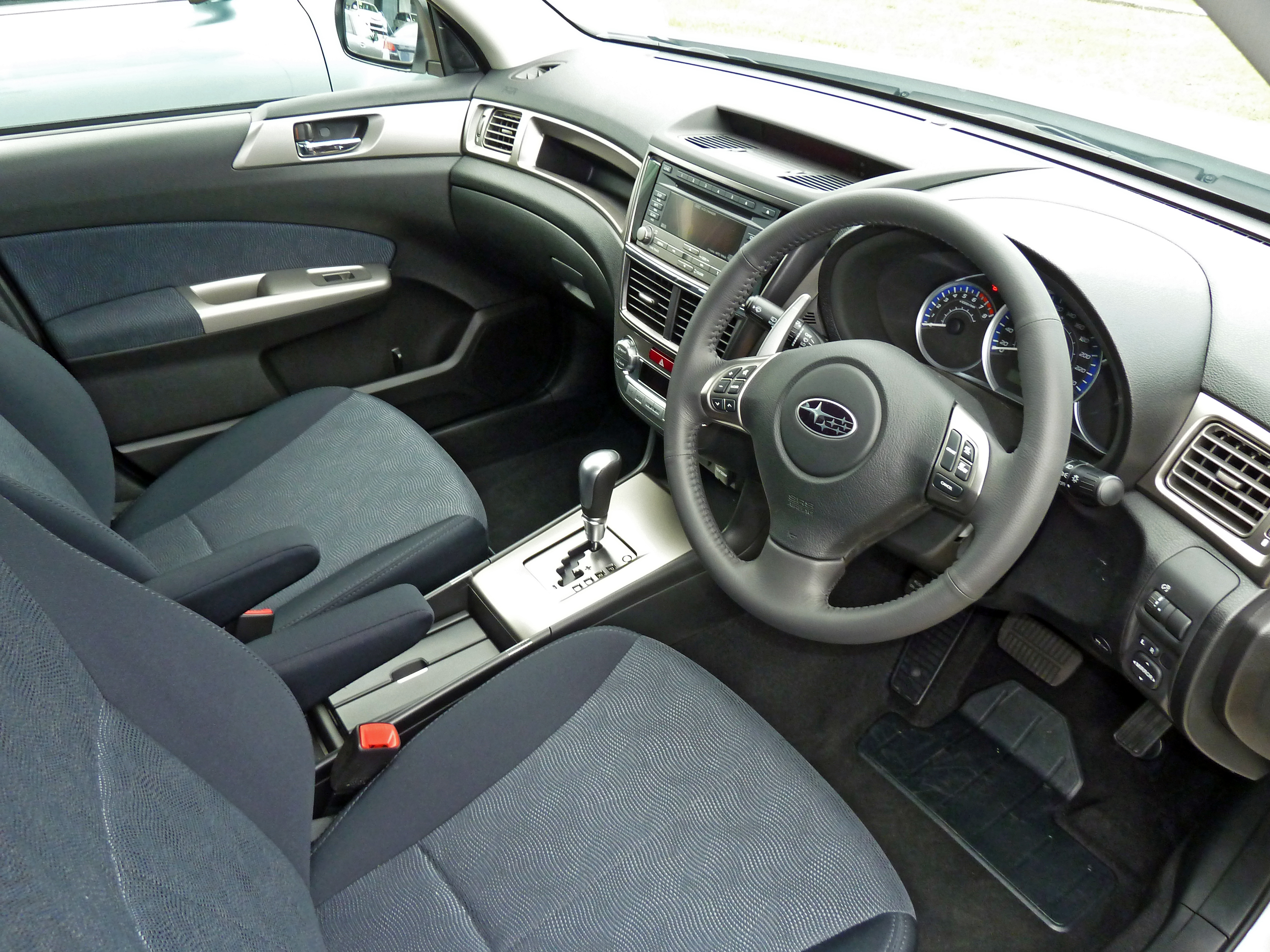
Interior

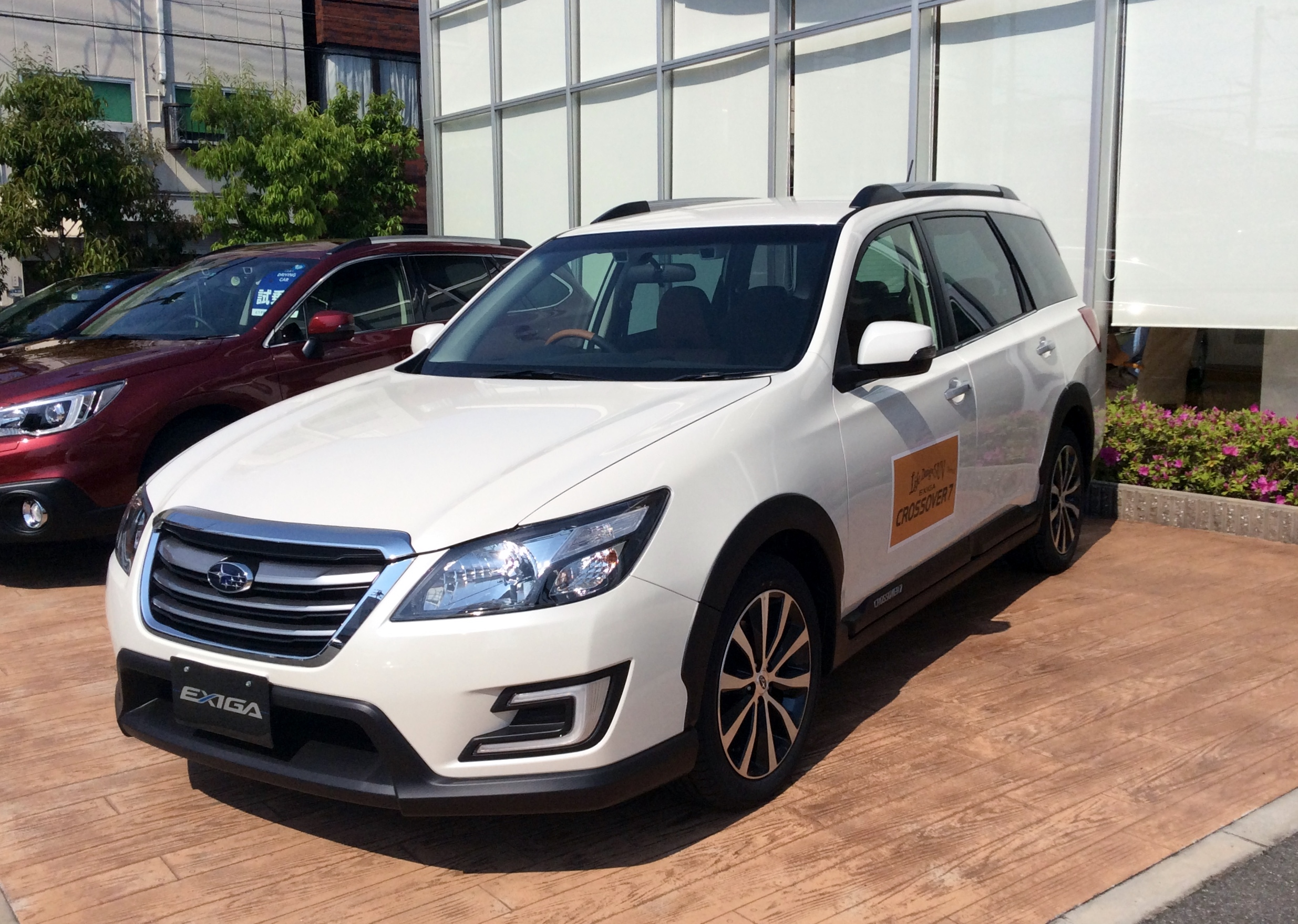
Exiga Crossover 7

Subaru announced on 16 April 2015 that they would be releasing the Exiga Crossover 7 in Japan.

The Exiga was discontinued in Japan in March 2018.

=== Australia ===
With the positive reputation of Liberty in the Australian market, the Exiga was released in Australia in November 2009. Marketed as Liberty Exiga, it is powered by 2.5-liter naturally aspirated EJ25 engine and available as the base 2.5i and upmarket 2.5i Premium trim levels.
