= Subaru =

Japanese automobile manufacturing company

- Logo since 2019

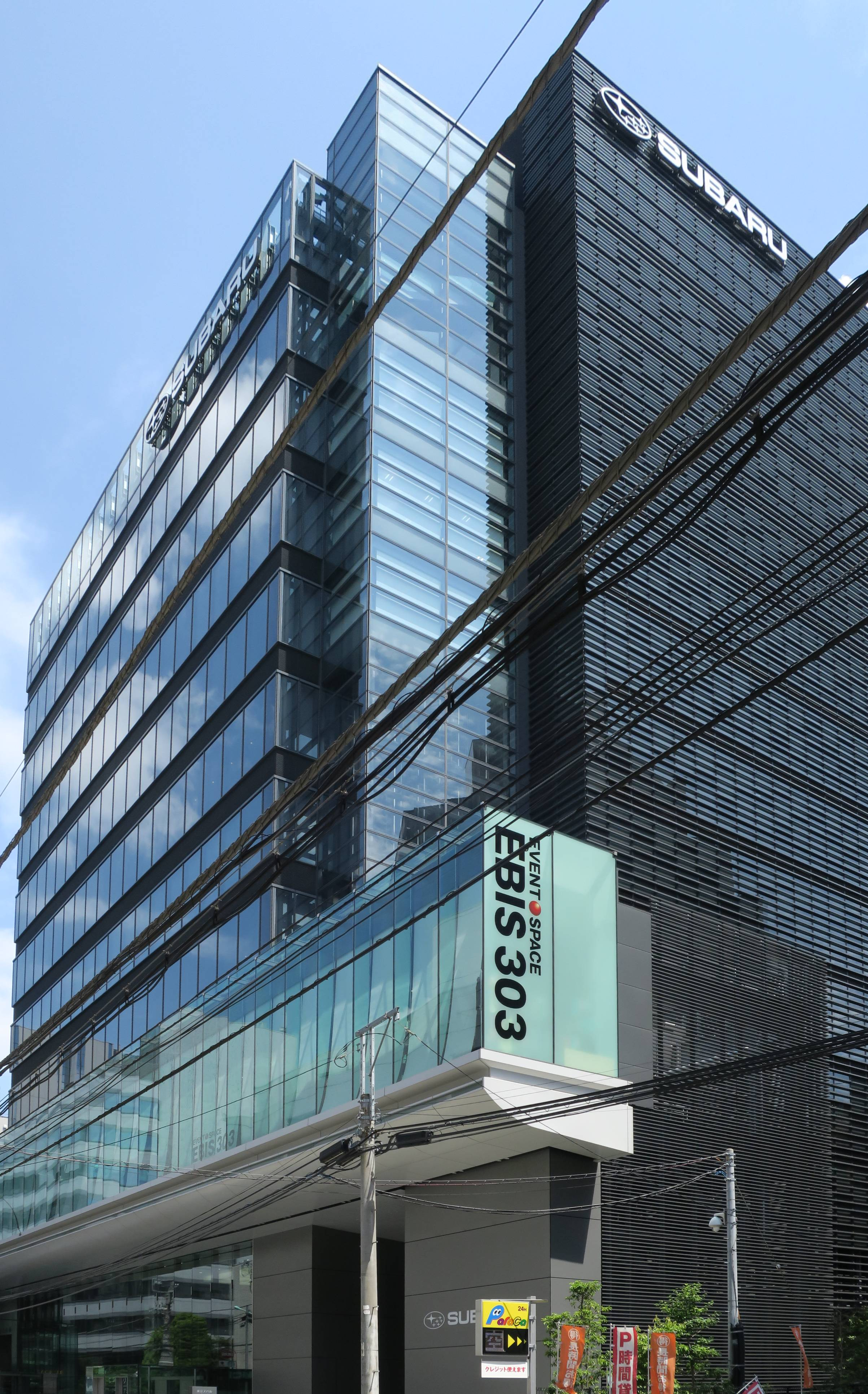
- Headquarters
- Native name: スバル
- Type: Division
- Industry: Automotive
- Predecessor: Nakajima Aircraft Company
- Founded: 15 July 1953; 73 years ago
- Founder: Kenji Kita; Chikuhei Nakajima
- Headquarters: Ebisu, Shibuya, Japan
- Area served: Worldwide
- Key people: Atsushi Osaki (president, Representative Director & CEO); Fumiaki Hayata (Chairman & Representative Director); Mamoru Ishii (Chief Design Officer)
- Products: Automobiles
- Production output: ▼912,452 units (Jan–Dec 2023)
- Number of employees: 16,961 (2022)
- Parent: Subaru Corporation
- Divisions: Subaru Tecnica International
- Website: subaru.co.jp

Subaru (スバル; /ˈsuːbəruː/ or /sʊˈbɑːruː/; Japanese pronunciation: [sɯꜜbaɾɯ]) is the automobile manufacturing division of Japanese transportation conglomerate Subaru Corporation (formerly known as Fuji Heavy Industries), the twenty-first largest automaker by production worldwide in 2017.

Subaru cars are known for their use of a boxer engine layout in most internal combustion vehicles above 1,500 cc. The Symmetrical All Wheel Drive drive-train layout was introduced in 1972. Both became standard equipment for mid-size and smaller cars in most markets by 1996. The lone exceptions are the BRZ, introduced in 2012 via a partnership with Toyota, which pairs the boxer engine with rear-wheel-drive, and the Uncharted, introduced in 2026 also in partnership with Toyota, which is front-wheel-drive in its standard configuration and offers Symmetrical All Wheel Drive as a factory option. Subaru also offers turbocharged versions of its passenger cars, such as the WRX, Levorg STI, Outback XT, Ascent, and formerly the Legacy GT, Legacy XT, and Forester XT.

In Western markets, Subaru vehicles have traditionally attracted a small but devoted core of buyers. The company's marketing targets those who desire its signature engine and drive train, all-wheel drive and rough-road capabilities, or affordable sports car designs.

Subaru is the transliteration of the Japanese すばる, meaning the Pleiades star cluster M45, or the "Seven Sisters" (one of whom tradition says is invisible — hence only six stars in the Subaru logo), which in turn inspires the logo and alludes to the companies that merged to create FHI.

== History ==
=== Fuji Heavy Industries (FHI) and Subaru's first cars ===
Fuji Heavy Industries started out as the Aircraft Research Laboratory in 1915, headed by Chikuhei Nakajima. In 1932, the company was reorganized as Nakajima Aircraft Company, Ltd and soon became a major manufacturer of aircraft for Japan during World War II. At the end of the Second World War, Nakajima Aircraft was again reorganized, this time as Fuji Sangyo Co, Ltd. In 1946, the company created the Fuji Rabbit, a motor scooter, with spare aircraft parts from the war. In 1950, Fuji Sangyo was divided into 12 smaller corporations according to the Japanese government's 1950 anti-zaibatsu legislation, the Corporate Credit Rearrangement Act. Between 1953 and 1955, five of these corporations and a newly formed corporation decided to merge to form Fuji Heavy Industries. These companies were: Fuji Kogyo, a scooter manufacturer; coachbuilder Fuji Jidosha; engine manufacturer Omiya Fuji Kogyo; chassis builder Utsunomiya Sharyo and the Tokyo Fuji Sangyo trading company.

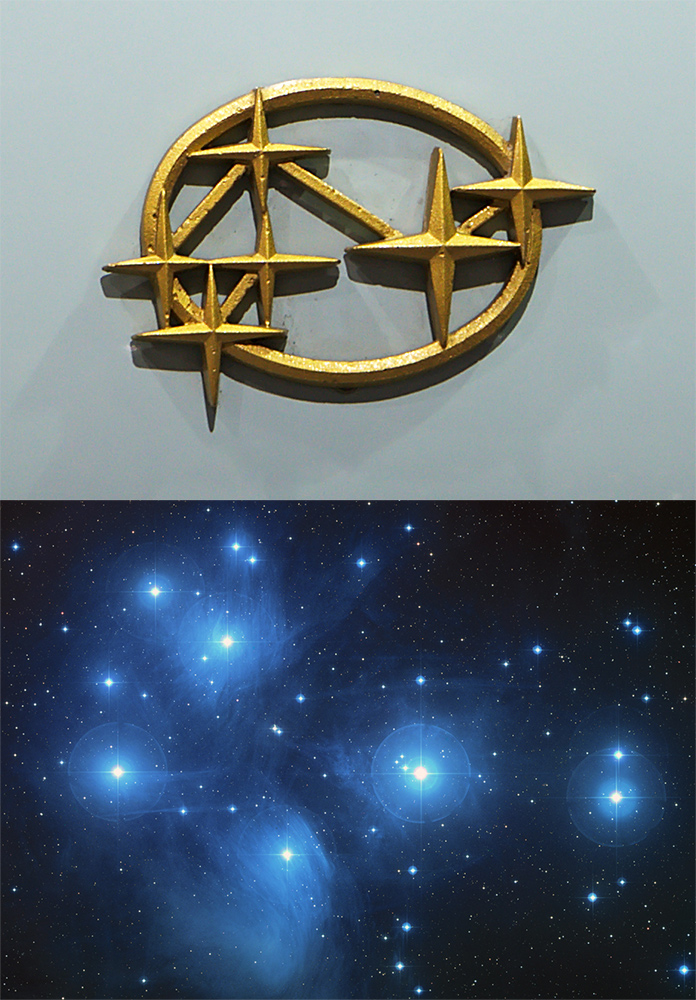
Former logo on a Subaru 360 showing six stars in an arrangement similar to the Pleiades open star cluster

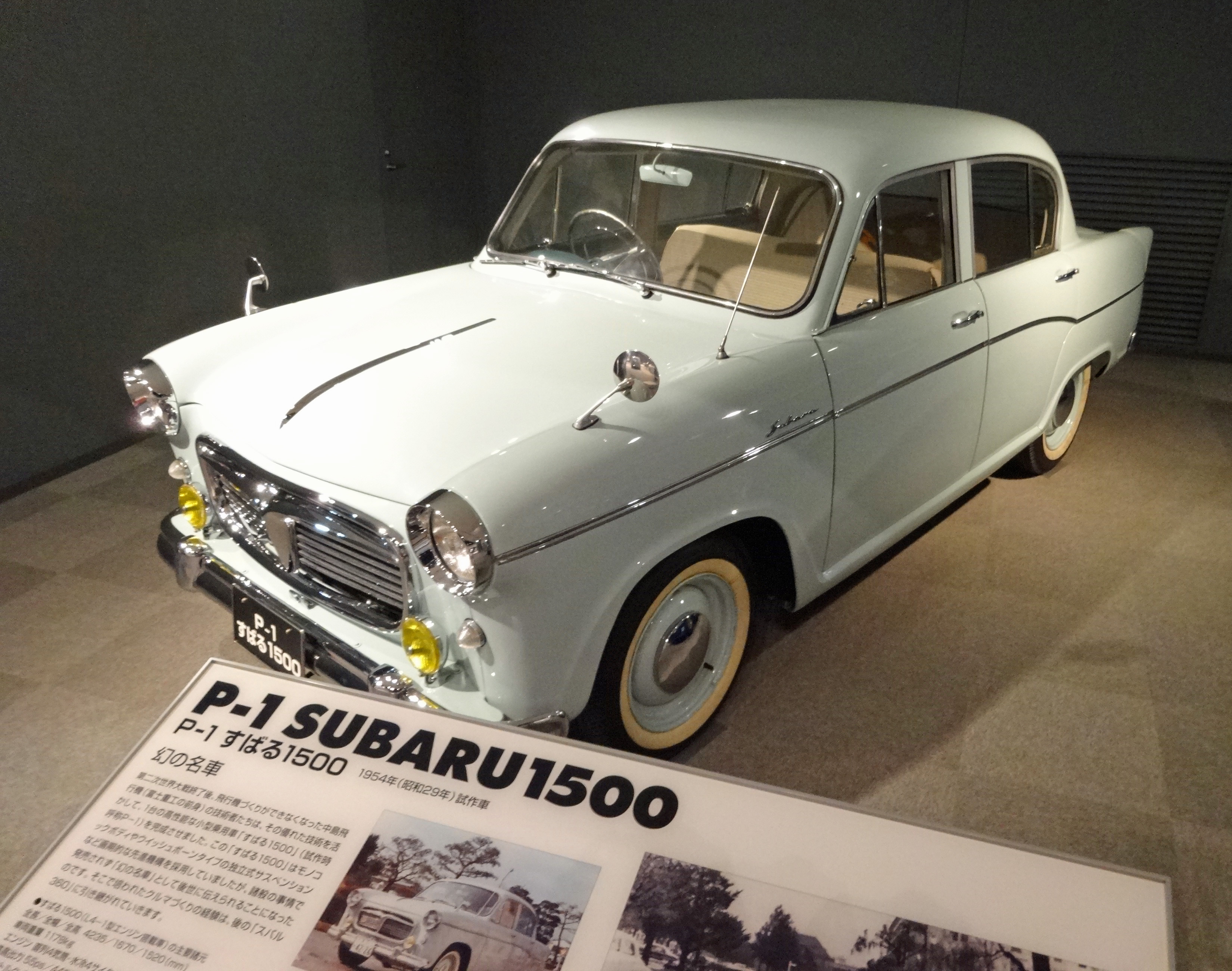
Subaru 1500, a.k.a. the P-1

Kenji Kita, CEO of Fuji Heavy Industries at the time, wanted the new company to be involved in car manufacturing and soon began plans for building a car with the development code-name P-1. Kita canvassed the company for suggestions about naming the P1, but none of the proposals were appealing enough. In the end he gave the company a Japanese name that he "had been cherishing in his heart": Subaru, which is the Japanese name for the Pleiades star cluster. The first Subaru car was named the Subaru 1500. Only twenty were manufactured owing to multiple supply issues. Subsequently, the company designed and manufactured dozens of vehicles including the 1500 (1954), the tiny air-cooled 360 (1958), the Sambar (1961), and the 1000 (which saw the introduction of the Subaru boxer engine in 1965).

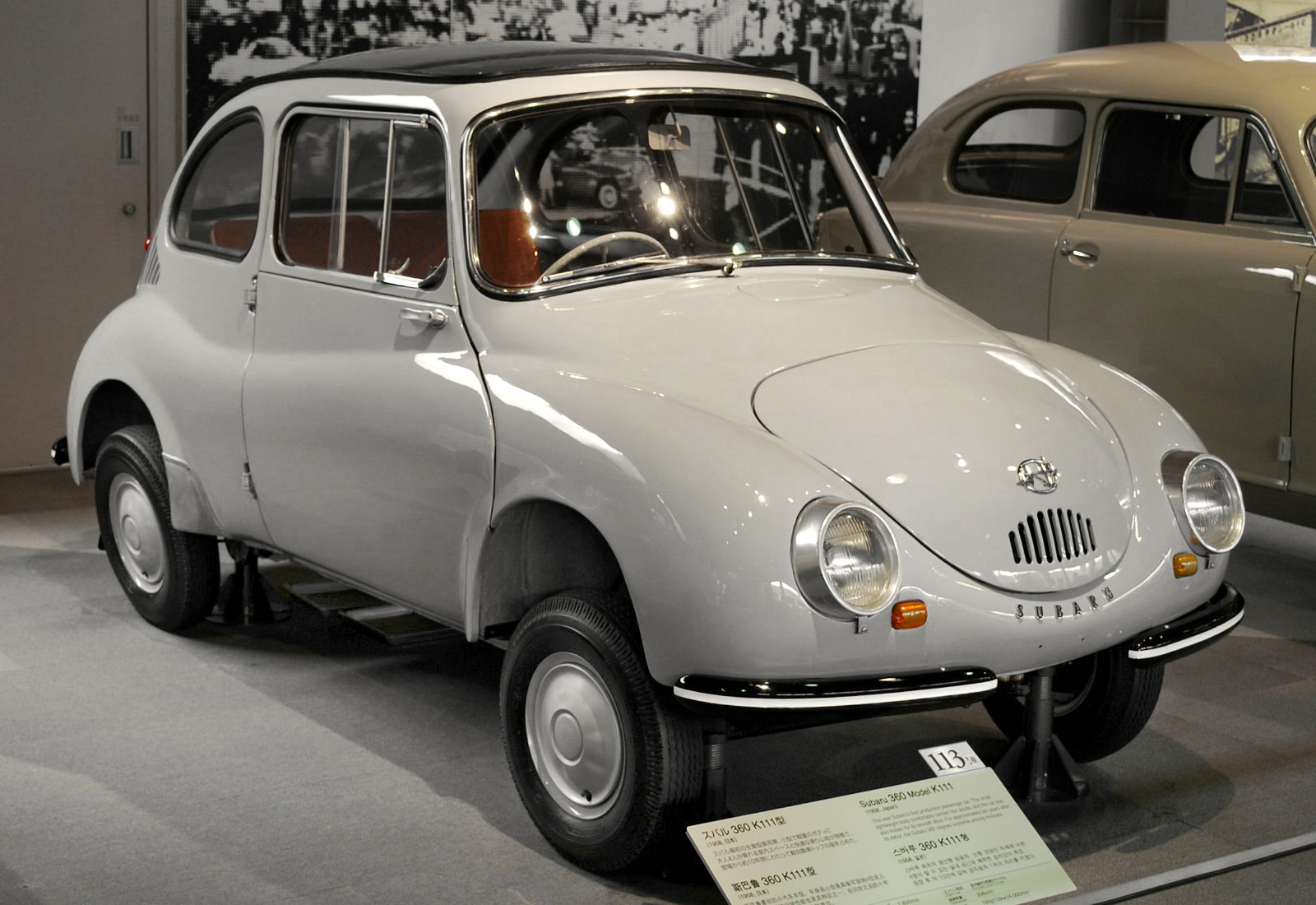
1958 Subaru 360

=== Later partnerships ===
Nissan acquired a 20.7% stake in Fuji Heavy Industries, Subaru's parent company, in 1968 during a period of government-ordered merging of the Japanese auto industry in order to improve competitiveness under the administration of Prime Minister Eisaku Satō. Nissan would utilize FHI's bus manufacturing capability and expertise for its Nissan Diesel line of buses. In turn many Subaru vehicles, even today, use parts from the Nissan manufacturing keiretsu. The Subaru automatic transmission, known as the 4EAT, is also used in the first generation Nissan Pathfinder. While under this arrangement with Nissan, Subaru introduced the R-2 (1969), the Rex and the Leone (1971), the BRAT (1978), Alcyone (1985), the Legacy (1989), the Impreza (1993) (and its WRX subtype), and the Forester (1997).

Upon Nissan's alliance with Renault, its stake in FHI was sold to General Motors in 1999. Troy Clarke of General Motors served as representative to Fuji Heavy Industries on its corporate board. During that time, Subaru introduced the Baja (2003), and the Tribeca (2005). The Subaru Forester was sold as a Chevrolet Forester in India in exchange for the Opel Zafira being sold as a Subaru Traviq in Japan. Also, the Chevrolet Borrego concept was presented in 2002, a crossover coupe/pickup truck being derived from the Japanese-market Legacy Turbo platform. During the brief General Motors period, a badge engineered Impreza was sold in the United States as the Saab 9-2X. An SUV (Subaru Tribeca/Saab 9-6X) was also planned but the Saab version did not proceed, and styling was recycled in the 2008 Tribeca refresh.

GM liquidated its holdings in FHI in 2005. Nearly all Saab-Subaru joint projects were dropped at that time, other than Subaru supplying parts for the Saab 9-2x. Toyota Motors bought a little over 40% of GM's former FHI stock, amounting to 8.7% of FHI. (The rest of GM's shares went to a Fuji stock buy-back program.) Toyota and Subaru have since collaborated on a number of projects, among them building the Toyota Camry in Subaru's Indiana U.S. plant beginning in April 2007. Subaru introduced the Exiga in 2008.

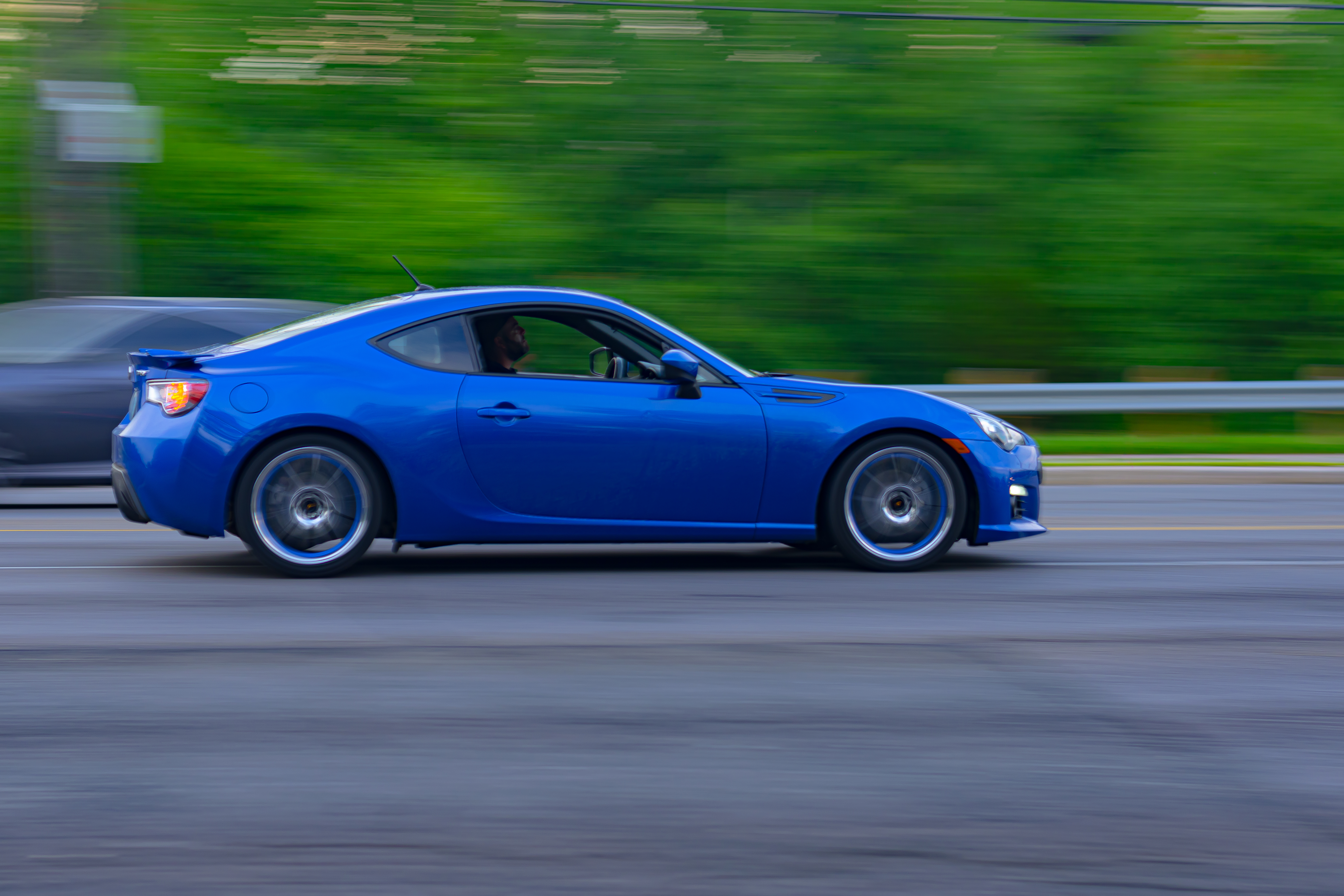
Subaru BRZ a car jointly developed by Toyota and Subaru

Toyota increased its share of FHI to 16.5% in July 2008. Subsequently, Toyota and Subaru jointly developed the Subaru BRZ, first sold in January 2012. Toyota sold the BRZ as the Scion FR-S in the US and Canada until 2018, where it was renamed to the Toyota 86 due to the discontinuation of the Scion brand in 2016. Around the time of Toyota's increased ownership, Subaru also declared that it would no longer develop its own Kei cars and trucks, instead selling rebadged products from Toyota's Daihatsu subsidiary. This also allowed Subaru, a small manufacturer, to focus on its core of boxer-engined family cars. The last of Subaru's own kei vehicles to be built was the sixth generation Subaru Sambar, which was taken out of production in March 2012 after 54 years of continuous manufacturing in this category. In 2022, Subaru launched the Solterra, a rebadged version of the Toyota bZ4X electric SUV.

=== Marketing ===
Some of the advertising slogans Subaru has used in the past include: "Inexpensive, and built to stay that way" (USA 1970s – early 1980s), "The World's Favourite Four Wheel Drive" (in the UK), "Plus on y pense, plus on a le goût de la conduire" (French: "The more you think about it, the more you want to drive it.") in French Quebec, "We built our reputation by building a better car", "What to Drive", "The Beauty of All-Wheel Drive", "Driven by What's Inside", "Think, Feel, Drive", "Confidence in Motion" (USA early 2010s) and currently "Love. It's what makes Subaru, Subaru" in North America, "All 4 The Driver" in Australia, "Uncommon Engineering, Uncommon Stability, Uncommon Roadholding, Uncommon Sense" in the UK and "Technology that gives you Confidence in Motion" in Southeast Asia.

In the 1990s, an ad firm hired by Subaru America found the all-wheel-drive cars were popular among lesbians in the US. The company started including subtle marketing to this demographic.

According to Automotive Lease Guide, Subaru ranked second place in vehicles that have the highest overall predicted resale values among all industry and all luxury vehicles for MY 2009. The awards are derived after carefully studying segment competition, historical vehicle performance and industry trends. According to a study done by J.D. Power and Associates for the 2008 Customer Retention Study, Subaru ranked at 50.5%, which was above the national average of 48%.

Subaru launched an animation series Wish Upon the Pleiades, also known as Hōkago no Pleiades (放課後のプレアデス, Hōkago no Pureadesu; lit. 'After School Pleiades'), developed jointly with Gainax. The 4-part mini episode series was released on YouTube on 1 February 2011. It featured a magical girl plot with Subaru as a leading protagonist.

== Current operations ==
Subaru's corporate headquarters are located in Ebisu, Tokyo.

=== Manufacturing facilities ===
Subaru is distinct from many of its Japanese competitors in that as of early 2016 almost 75% of its cars sold internationally were made in Japan. Subaru's facilities designated to automotive manufacturing are located in Ōta, Gunma Prefecture, consisting of four locations: Subaru-chō is where the Subaru BRZ/Toyota 86 is built; having been re-purposed from kei car production, Yajima Plant is where all current Subaru cars are built; Otakita Plant is where commercial kei trucks are built (originally a factory location of Nakajima Aircraft Company); and Oizumi Plant in Oizumi, Gunma Prefecture, is where engines and transmissions are built.

Subaru's major overseas manufacturing facility is located in Lafayette, Indiana; the factory is called Subaru of Indiana Automotive, Inc. Due to continued sales growth in North American markets, vehicle production capacity at the Lafayette assembly plant is set to expand to 390,000 vehicles annually. Under the current strategic plan, Subaru will have a total production capacity of 1,026,000 vehicles per year at the end of 2016.

=== Subaru in Asia ===
In some Asian countries outside of Japan, Subaru vehicles, parts and accessories are supplied by Motor Image Group, a wholly owned subsidiary of Tan Chong Motor.

Subaru has entered the Philippine operations started in 1996 under the Columbian Motors Philippines ownership but withdrew in 2000. Subaru models were temporarily sold in GM Autoworld dealerships from 2000 to 2005. The brand re-entered the market in 2006 under the new management by Motor Image Pilipinas, Inc. Subaru has seventeen dealerships in the country: Greenhills, Pasig, Manila Bay, Alabang, Davao, Cebu, Cagayan de Oro, Iloilo, Santa Rosa, Batangas, Bonifacio Global City, Taguig, General Santos, Cavite, Legazpi, Albay, Camarines Sur, Bacolod, and Pampanga. Subaru has seen popularity in its SUV line-up in the market in recent years, with the Forester and the XV being one of its popular selling models.

Subaru cars has been exported to China since 2004. In 2011, Subaru and Chinese automaker Chery intended to establish a 50-50 joint venture to produce Subaru vehicles in China. The plan was to establish a 30 billion yen facility in Dalian, Liaoning with initial annual capacity of 50,000 cars, that would later expand to 150,000 units. The initial joint venture proposal was rejected by Chinese authorities, as FHI affiliate Toyota already has two joint ventures in China, which is the maximum amount allowed. Later in 2012, the proposal was rejected for the second time due to production overcapacity in the country.

Subaru once had a presence in South Korea, established in 2009 in Yongsan, Seoul under Choi Seung-dal. Sales started in April 2010 with the Legacy, Outback and Forester as the initial lineup for the South Korean market. They were the fifth Japanese automobile manufacturer to enter after Toyota, Honda, Nissan and Mitsubishi. According to the company, it delayed its entry due to market dominance by Hyundai and Kia. By 2012, Subaru Korea announced that they would discontinue selling 2013 car models due to low sales.

On 23 April 2019, Subaru officially opened its production plant in Lat Krabang, Bangkok, Thailand, the plant is a joint venture between Subaru Corporation and Hong Kong-listed Tan Chong International (TCIL), which holds a 74.9 percent stake. The plant was formerly a Mitsubishi Fuso factory that was repurposed, and will supply Subaru vehicle to markets in Asia, including Australia and New Zealand. According to media interview with Glenn Tan, the plant will have a maximum capacity of 100,000 vehicles per year, and up to a maximum of 4 models to be manufactured. Current production in 2019 is planned for 6,000 vehicles for Forester model only. Indonesia has been supported by PT Plaza Auto Mega since February 2020.

=== Subaru in the United Kingdom ===
In 1974, Robert Edmiston was finance director at sports car manufacturer Jensen Motors. When the company went bankrupt, he used a £6,000 redundancy payout to set up International Motors, which acquired the UK franchise for Subaru and Isuzu. The Coleshill-based company is still the parent for Subaru in the UK.

=== Subaru in Australia ===
Subaru have operated in Australia since the mid-1950s with imports of the 360 & ff-1 Star 1000. Official operations began since 1973 and have multiple showrooms across the country.

=== Subaru in the United States ===
Subaru of America (SOA) was established in 1968 in Bala Cynwyd, Pennsylvania, by Malcolm Bricklin and Harvey Lamm and relocated to Pennsauken, New Jersey, shortly thereafter. In 1986, SOA relocated to Cherry Hill, New Jersey, and Fuji Heavy Industries (now known as Subaru Corporation) acquired full ownership in 1990. In 2018, SOA relocated to a brand new headquarters in Camden, New Jersey. SOA operates regional offices, zone offices and parts distribution centers throughout the United States. SOA also operates port facilities on both the West and East coasts.

In 1989, Subaru and then-partner Isuzu opened a joint factory in Lafayette, Indiana, called Subaru-Isuzu Automotive, or SIA, which initially manufactured the Subaru Legacy and Isuzu Rodeo. In 2001 Isuzu sold its stake in the plant to Fuji Heavy Industries for $1 due to flagging sales and it was renamed Subaru of Indiana Automotive, Inc. SIA has been designated backyard wildlife habitat by the National Wildlife Federation and has achieved a zero-landfill production designation (the first automotive assembly plant in the United States to earn that designation).

== Motorsports ==
Subaru as a Formula One engine manufacturer
Formula One World Championship career
- First entry: 1990 United States Grand Prix
- Last entry: 1990 British Grand Prix
- Races entered: 8
- Chassis: Coloni

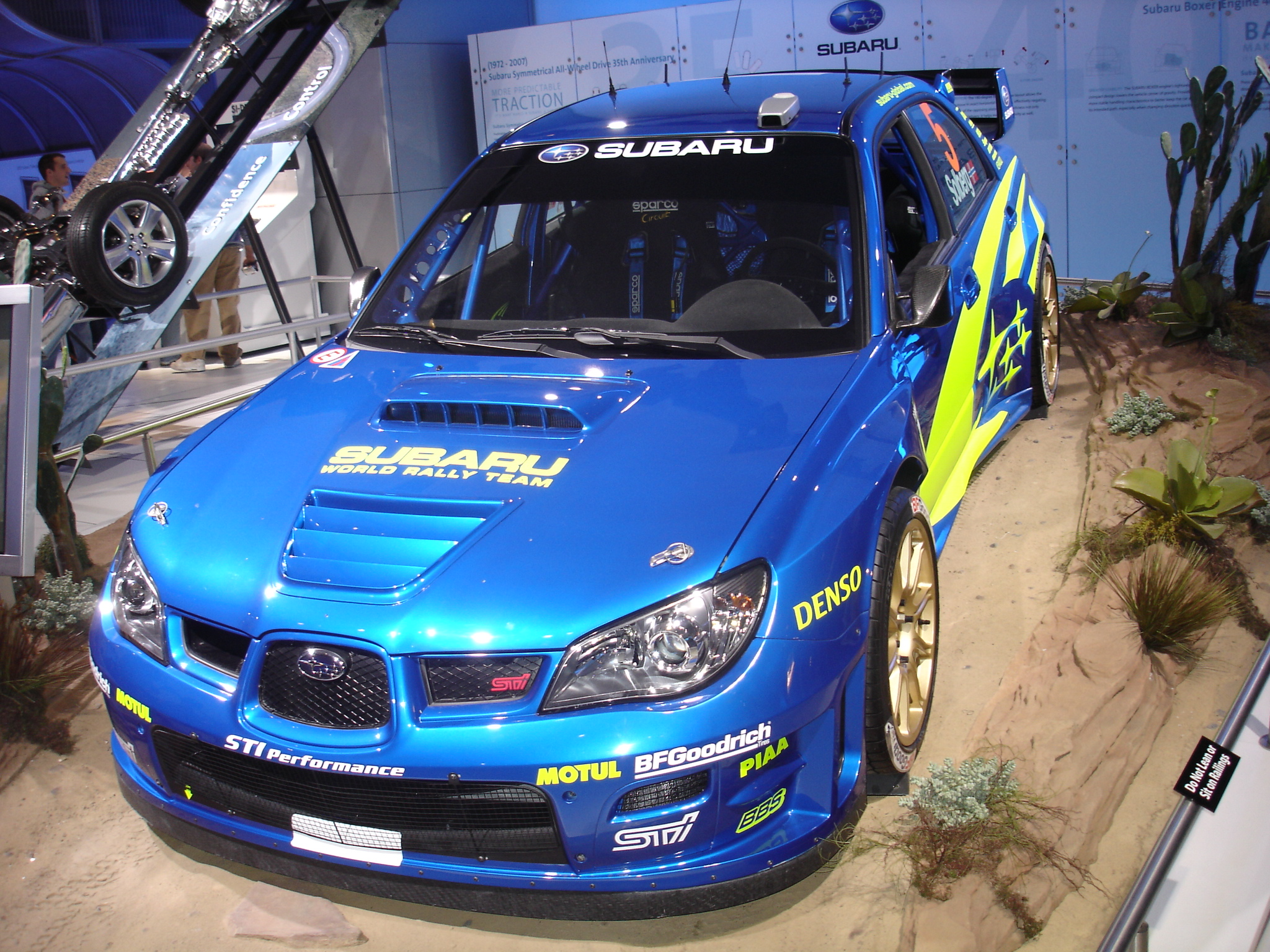
Subaru Impreza WRC

Subaru Rally Team Japan led by Noriyuki Koseki (founder of Subaru Tecnica International, STI) ran Subaru Leone coupé, sedan DL, RX (SRX) and RX Turbo in the World Rally Championship between 1980 and 1989. Drivers for individual rallies included Ari Vatanen, Per Eklund, Shekhar Mehta, Mike Kirkland, Possum Bourne and Harald Demut. Mike Kirkland finished 6th overall and won the A Group at the 1986 Safari Rally. That year Subaru was one of the only manufacturers combining 4WD and turbo after Audi's successful quattro system had been introduced in 1980, but Audi withdrew from the WRC after safety concerns and Ford's serious accident early in the 1986 season. Subaru changed the rally model to Legacy RS for the 1990–1992 period and took part in the first complete season in the World Rally Championship with the same model in 1993.

Modified versions of the Impreza WRX and WRX STi have been competing successfully in rallying. Drivers Colin McRae (1995), Richard Burns (2001) and Petter Solberg (2003) have won World Rally Championship drivers' titles with the Subaru World Rally Team and Subaru took the manufacturers' title three years in a row from 1995 to 1997. Subaru's World Rally Championship cars are prepared and run by Prodrive, the highly successful British motorsport team. Several endurance records were set in the early and mid-nineties by the Subaru Legacy. The Subaru Justy also holds the world record for the fastest sub 1.0L car without a turbo: 123.224 mph average, it was set in 1989.

Subaru was briefly involved in Formula One circuit racing when it bought a controlling interest in the tiny Italian Coloni team for the 1990 season. The Coloni 3B's 12-cylinder engine was badged as a Subaru and shared the boxer layout with the company's own engines, but was an existing design built by Italian firm Motori Moderni. The cars were overweight and underpowered and the partnership broke down before the season finished. With the rise of rally racing and the Import scene in the US, the introduction of the highly anticipated Subaru Impreza WRX in 2001 was successful in bringing high-performance AWD compact cars into the sports car mainstream. Subaru supplied a factory-backed team, Subaru Rally Team USA for Rally America and won the driver's title six times, most recently in 2011 with David Higgins. Grassroots Motorsports awarded Subaru with the Editors' Choice Award in 2002.

Since 2005, Cusco Racing have entered an Impreza and a BRZ in the Super GT championship. In 2008, the Impreza was the first 4-door and first 4WD vehicle to win a race. Starting in 2006, Subaru of America (SOA), as the official distributor of Subaru vehicles in the United States participates in the Subaru Road Racing Team (SRRT) with a Subaru Legacy 2.5 GT Spec-B in the Grand-Am Street Tuner class. In 2010, SRRT campaigns a Subaru Impreza WRX STI in the Grand Sport class. In 2011, SRRT switched from the hatchback to a 2011 Subaru Impreza WRX STI sedan.

On 16 December 2008, it was announced that Subaru would no longer be competing in the World Rally Championships. The decision was made by Subaru's parent company, Fuji Heavy Industries (FHI), partly as a result of the economic downturn but also because it was felt Subaru had achieved its sporting and marketing objectives. Ikuo Mori denied that alterations to the WRC technical regulations in 2010 or a rumored deterioration in the working relationship with Prodrive had any impact on the decision. He also said that the possibility of a Subaru car back in the top category of WRC in the future is not zero, but for this moment there can be no assumption of a comeback.

In 2011, Mark Higgins used a stock Impreza to set a lap record at the Isle of Man TT course. In 2016, Higgins again broke the record in a modified WRX STI. On 4 May 2012, Subaru Rally Team USA announced that a new rallycross team, Subaru Puma Rallycross Team USA, will participate in the 2012 Global RallyCross Championship season with Dave Mirra, Bucky Lasek, and Sverre Isachsen. They also competed in the 2014 FIA World Rallycross Championship. Also in 2012, Subaru became the naming rights sponsor of the chief domestic road cycling competition in Australia, the National Road Series. The Impreza has won hillclimbs such as the Silverstone Race to the Sky and Mount Washington Hillclimb Auto Race.

== EyeSight system ==
In 2008, Subaru introduced their EyeSight collision avoidance system, a type of advanced driver-assistance system (ADAS). Unlike most such systems, which use radar sensors, EyeSight initially launched with dual charge-coupled device (CCD) cameras mounted at the top of the windshield. Depth information is derived from the parallax between two video signals and used to judge the distance to the next vehicle for features such as pre-collision braking and adaptive cruise control. Real-world studies of early EyeSight generations show that this system reduces rear-end crashes with injuries by 85 percent, and reduces pedestrian-related injuries by 35 percent.

As of 2022, Subaru sold 5 million cars equipped with the system, and EyeSight-equipped vehicles account for 91% of total vehicle sales. In the U.S., the EyeSight system is standard on most models equipped with CVTs, and is also standard on automatic transmission BRZ models.

Unlike some other manufacturers (e.g., Toyota), Subaru North America has not provided clear and consistent branding of its Eyesight generations – though some versions are referenced in their owners manuals. This makes it challenging to distinguish key differences, performance, and improvements among model years. Much more detailed information is available in the Japanese EyeSight article.

Version	Launch date	Technology changes, notes	Adaptive cruise	Lane departure systems	Pre-collision braking	Rear radar features
Eyesight Gen 1	2008 (Japan-only)	Hitachi manufactured Front-facing stereoscopic greyscale cameras (x2)	Operates from 0–100 km/h (0–62 mph)	Warns during lane sway or departure	30 km/h (19 mph) maximum speed differential for braking	—N/a
Eyesight Gen 2	2012 (2013 MY)	Improved overall performance	Operates from 0–100 km/h (0–62 mph)	Warns during lane sway or departure	30 km/h (19 mph) maximum speed differential for braking	—N/a
Eyesight Gen 3	2014 (2015 MY)	Front-facing cameras updated, now color Lower profile in vehicle for improved stray light rejection Adds rear radar option	Adds "Lane Keeping Assist" to gently steer inside lanes if speed is above 65 km/h (40 mph)	Applies torque to center the vehicle if unsignaled lane change occurs	Improved speed differential for braking if speed is under 50 km/h (31 mph); New cameras increase range and viewing angle by ~40% Throttle management added for reversing	Adds rear cross traffic alerts, blind spot detection, and lane change warnings.
Eyesight Gen 4	2021 (MY 2022)	New camera system from Veoneer, core CPU from Xilinx; Camera body has integrated heater and cooling fans, lens housing now flush to windshield. Optional third front-facing wide-range mono camera (some models)	Wider angle camera for smoother cruise around sharp curves	Improved performance	Adds Automatic Emergency Steering, if speed is under 80 km/h (50 mph); Adds electronic brake booster Optional wide-angle camera improves pedestrian and bike detection	If included, enables Automatic Emergency Steering for collision prevention
Eyesight X	No North America release (2020 Japan, Europe only on Levorg)	Based on Gen 4 Platform; Adds front-facing 77 GHz MW wave radar Adds front corner radars				
Eyesight Gen 5	2026+	AMD Versal AI Edge Series (Gen 2) SOC, onsemi Hyperlux AR0823AT Sensors				
Legend: Unsupported Latest version Future version

== Technology and fuel consumption ==
=== Diesel ===
The 2007 Frankfurt International Motor Show saw Subaru introduce a horizontally opposed, water-cooled, common rail turbodiesel using a variable geometry turbocharger called the Subaru EE engine, the first of its type to be fitted to a passenger car. Volkswagen had experimented with this idea during the 1950s and made two air-cooled boxer prototype diesel engines that were not turbocharged. VW installed one engine in a Type 1 and another in a Type 2.

The Subaru engine was rated at 110 kW (150 PS; 148 hp) and 350 N⋅m (260 ft⋅lbf) with a displacement of 2.0 liters. In March 2008 Subaru offered the Legacy Sedan and Wagon and the Outback Wagon with 2.0 liter turbodiesel in the EU with a 5-speed manual transmission.

In September 2008, Subaru announced that the diesel Forester and diesel Impreza will be introduced at the 2008 Paris Motor Show, with Forester sales to begin October 2008 and diesel Impreza sales to start January 2009 in the UK. The Forester and Impreza will have a 6-speed manual transmission, whereas the Legacy and Outback have 5-speed manual transmissions.

=== Electric vehicles ===
In June 2006, Fuji Heavy Industries, Inc. (FHI) launched its Subaru Stella Plug-in electric vehicle which is a kei car equipped with a lithium-ion battery pack. The vehicle has a short range of 56 miles (90 km) but it actually costs more than the Mitsubishi iMiEV, at ¥4,380,000 (US$44,860), including Japanese Government consumption taxes with an exemption of $2,240. It also qualified for a rebate from the Japanese Government of up to $14,200, bringing the price down to $30,660. The vehicle is much like the i-MiEV, with a 47-kilowatt motor and a quick-charge capability, but the two-door mini-car has a boxy shape. FHI set a goal of selling 170 vehicles by March 2010.

In Japan, Subaru tested two electric vehicles called the Subaru R1e and Subaru G4e between 2003 and 2009. The Subaru Hybrid Tourer Concept is a four-seat vehicle with gull-wing doors that combines a 2-liter turbocharged direct-injection gasoline engine with a continuously variable transmission and two axle-mounted motors. A lithium-ion battery pack provides energy storage for the vehicle. In early 2018, Subaru, along with Suzuki, Daihatsu and Hino Motors, joined the nascent EV C.A. Spirit venture to collaborate on electric vehicle technology development. The project was launched by Toyota, Mazda and automotive component manufacturer Denso in September 2017.

In the U.S., the short-lived Crosstrek hybrid was on the market only for the 2014 to 2017 model years. In 2018, for the 2019 model year, Subaru unveiled the 2019 model year Crosstrek Plug-in Hybrid, based in large part on technology from shareholder Toyota's Prius Prime platform. The EV range is 27 km (17 miles). It is only available in California and parts of the East Coast. Subaru's first all-electric car, named Solterra, is the first vehicle to be based on the e-Subaru Global Platform (e-SGP) co-developed by Toyota and Subaru. The Solterra debuted at the Los Angeles Auto Show on 17 November 2021, and worldwide sales of the Solterra commenced in mid-2022.

=== Electronics ===
Since the 2005 model year, Subaru has adopted CAN bus technology for the US and Canada markets. Starting in the 2007 model year, all Subaru vehicles use the CAN technology. Typically, two CAN-buses are used on vehicles: a high-speed CAN running at 500 kbit/s for powertrain communication, and a low-speed CAN running at 125 kbit/s for body control functions and instrument panels. A body-integrated unit (BIU) is used between these two networks.

Clarion and Harman Kardon are among the audio, video, and navigation technology suppliers for Subaru products in North America. Clarion announced in 2015 that it was introducing its "Smart Access" platform, formerly only offered on Clarion's aftermarket products, to the units to be installed in certain Subaru 2015 models in North America. Smart Access is able to work with the driver's smartphone (either iPhone or Android) and allows access to various car-safe apps running on the phone via the car's built-in infotainment screen. Subaru and Clarion have also, with Liberty Mutual Insurance, introduced the "RightTrack" in-vehicle app which will be able to monitor the driver's habits, make suggestions for safer driving, and possibly offer insurance discounts.

=== Subaru Global Platform (SGP) ===
Subaru debuted its new chassis design, dubbed the Subaru Global Platform, with the release of the 2017 model year Impreza. Having spent over a billion dollars on research and development the company plans to extend the architecture to all of its other models, with the exception of the BRZ which is co-developed with Toyota. By incorporating high-strength steel into the chassis updated vehicles will have stiffer bodies that increase safety through greater impact absorption while also improving ride comfort. Another focus of the new platform is modularity, allowing Subaru to reduce development costs by streamlining production throughout its network of facilities. The platform will be able to accommodate a variety of powertrains, including gasoline, hybrid, and fully electric designs.

== Environmental record ==
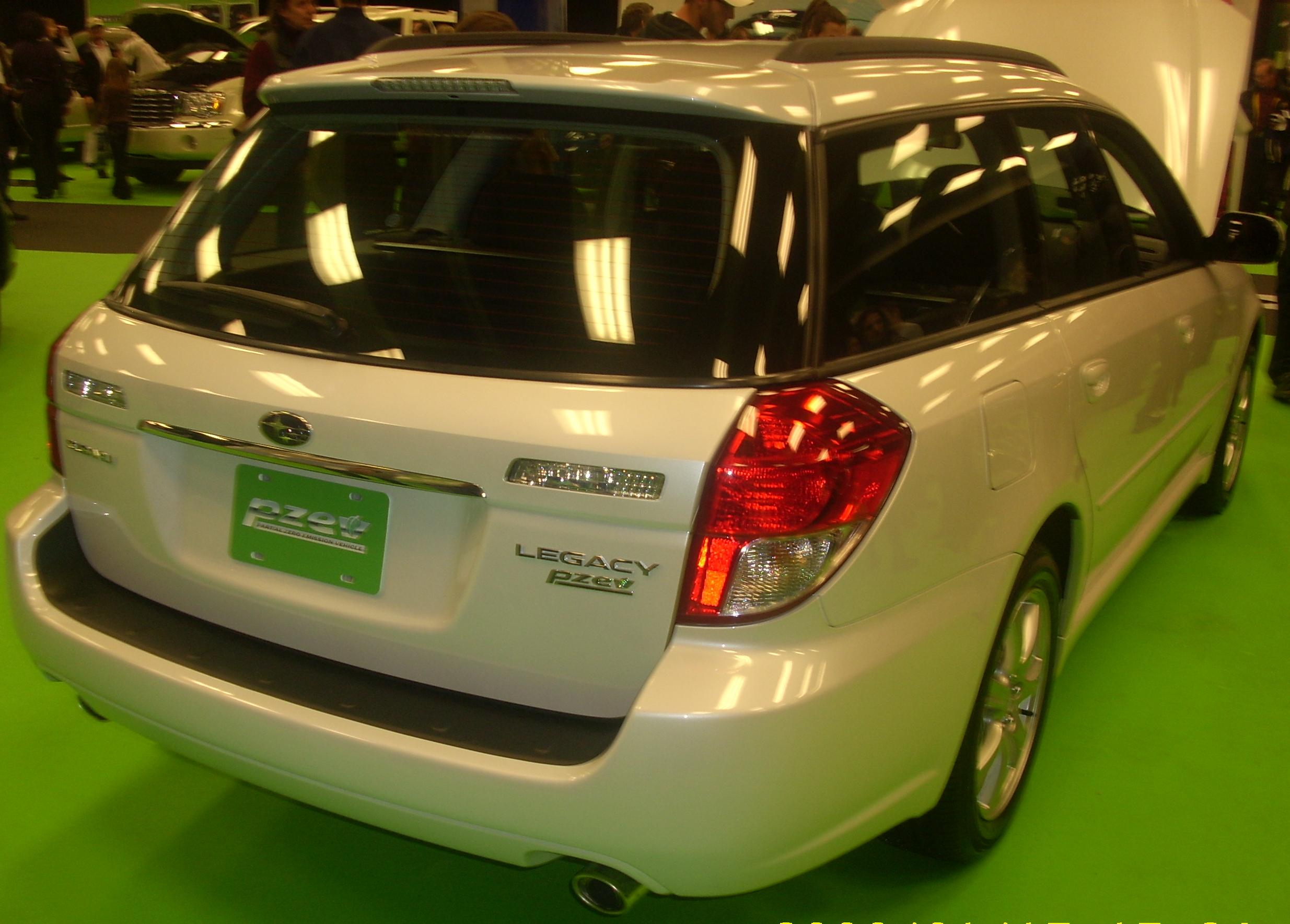
USA-spec Subaru Legacy PZEV

Subaru claims to have implemented advanced policies which include recycling, reducing harmful emissions, and educating its employees. Its efforts have helped it in its environmental initiatives. The Subaru plant in Lafayette, Indiana (SIA) was the first auto assembly plant to achieve zero-landfill status; nothing from the manufacturing process goes into a landfill. The company has developed a recycling plan for the "end-of-life" of their cars. Most of its modern products use highly recyclable materials throughout the vehicle, in the engine, transmission, suspension and elsewhere in each vehicle leaving Subaru with a 97.3% recycling ratio rate for their end-of-life vehicles.

An excerpt from the Subaru website stated "In 2006, SIA was awarded the United States Environmental Protection Agency's Gold Achievement Award as a top achiever in the agency's WasteWise program to reduce waste and improve recycling." The website also stated that "It also became the first U.S. automotive assembly plant to be designated a wildlife habitat."

Subaru currently offers Partial Zero Emissions Vehicle (PZEV) certified Legacy, Outback, Impreza, Crosstrek and Forester models which are available for sale anywhere in the U.S. Subaru PZEV vehicles meet California's Super-Ultra-Low-Emission Vehicle exhaust emission standard. All other models have been certified LEV2.

== Subaru vehicles ==
=== Other manufacturers ===
Subaru has partnered with various manufacturers over time. Below are some of the models sold in Asia and Europe. In Japan they are in the Kei car class with either front or all wheel drive and a straight engine. An article posted by Autoblog on 16 April 2008, stated that due to a corporate investment by Toyota, all kei cars built by Subaru will be replaced by Daihatsu models beginning in 2010.

- Subaru Bighorn (1988–1993, rebadged Isuzu Trooper)
- Subaru Justy (1994–2010, 2016–present: rebadged Suzuki Cultus (1994–2003), Suzuki Ignis (2003–2007), Daihatsu Boon (2007–2010) and Daihatsu Thor (2016–present). Nameplate originally used from 1984 to 1994.)
- Subaru Traviq (1999–2005, rebadged Opel Zafira)
- Subaru Dex (2006–2012, rebadged Toyota bB)
- Subaru Dias Wagon (2009–present, rebadged Daihatsu Atrai)
- Subaru Lucra (2010–2015, rebadged Daihatsu Tanto Exe)
- Subaru Trezia (2010–2016, rebadged Toyota Ractis)
- Subaru Pleo (2010–2018 as a rebadged Daihatsu Mira, nameplate in use since 1998)
- Subaru Stella (2010–2023, 2025–present: rebadged Daihatsu Move)
- Subaru Pleo Plus (2012–present, rebadged Daihatsu Mira e:S)
- Subaru Sambar (2012–present as a rebadged Daihatsu Hijet, nameplate in use since 1961)
- Subaru Chiffon (2016–present, rebadged Daihatsu Tanto)
- Subaru Rex (2022–present, rebadged Daihatsu Rocky)

== See also ==
- Prodrive Motorsport team selected by Subaru to run its World Rally Team
- Subaru Technica International (also known as STI)
- List of Subaru engines
- List of Subaru transmissions
- Subaru EA engine series
- Subaru EF engine series
- Subaru EJ engine series
- Subaru FB engine series
- Subaru CB engine
- Symmetrical All Wheel Drive
