= Subaru R1 =

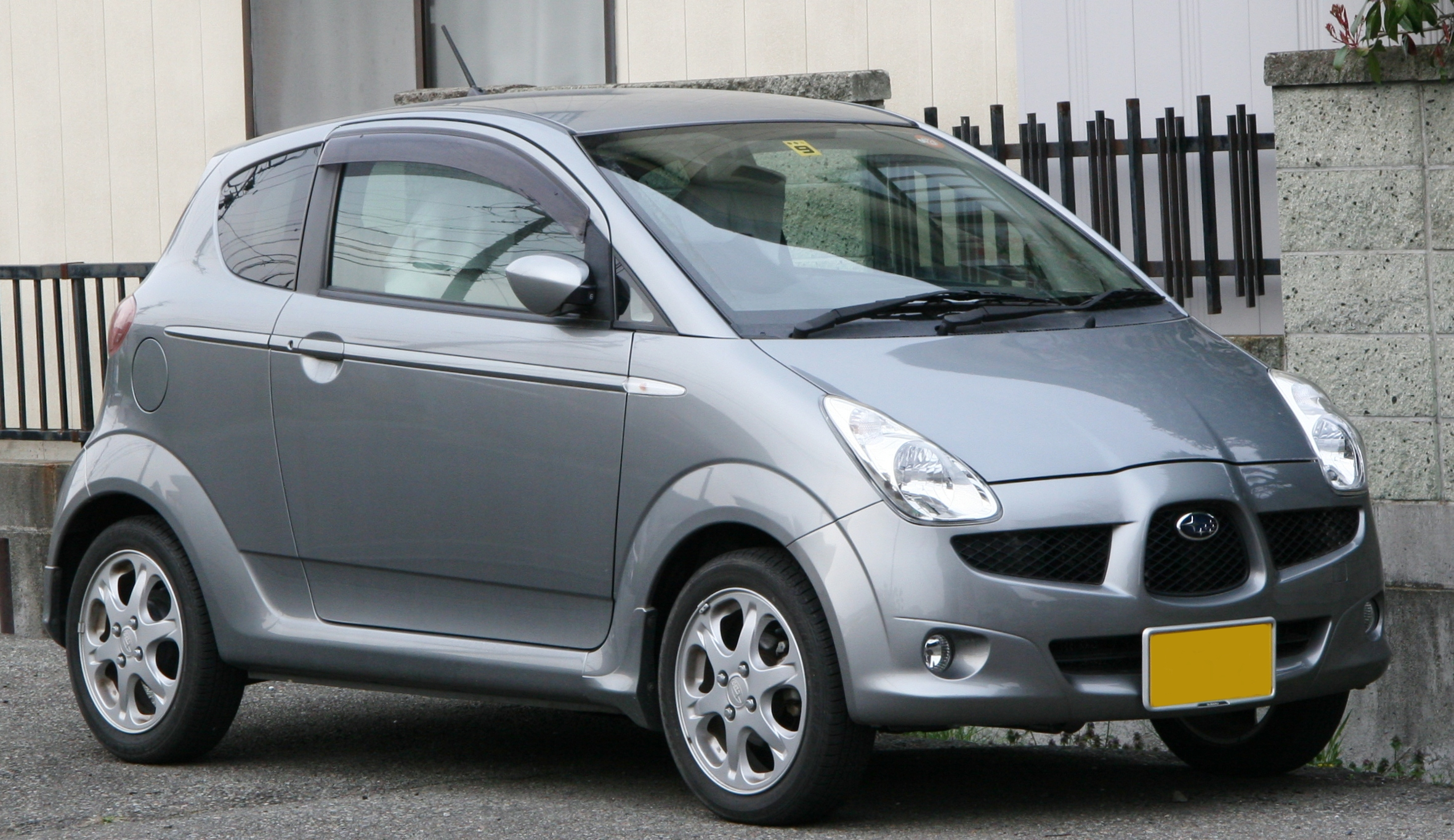

Overview
- Also called: Subaru R1e
- Production: 2005–2010
- Assembly: Japan: Ōta, Gunma (Ōta plant)
- Designer: Andreas Zapatinas

Body and chassis
- Class: Kei car
- Body style: 3-door hatchback
- Related: Subaru R2

Powertrain
- Engine: 658 cc (40.2 cu in) EN07U I 4; 658 cc (40.2 cu in) EN07D DOHC AVCS I 4; 658 cc (40.2 cu in) EN07X DOHC I 4 supercharged (STi)
- Transmission: iCVT

Dimensions
- Wheelbase: 2,195 mm (86.4 in)
- Length: 3,285 mm (129.3 in)
- Width: 1,475 mm (58.1 in)
- Height: 1,510 mm (59.4 in)
- Curb weight: 800 kg (1,763.7 lb)

Chronology
- Successor: Subaru Pleo (second generation); Subaru Lucra

The Subaru R1 is a kei car manufactured by the Japanese carmaker Subaru from 2005 to 2010.

== Design ==
Entering production on January 4, 2005, the R1 is a two-door version of the Subaru R2, but with a shorter body and wheelbase. The R1 is unusual in that it does not use up the maximum length allowed for by the kei car regulations—the only other kei cars to have done this since the 1989 Autozam Carol were the Suzuki Twin, Daihatsu Midget, Toyota C+pod, and the European Smart Fortwo.

The R1 was only available in one spec level up to the end of 2005, using a 658 cc Subaru EN engine. The engine is available in three versions: the I with the EN07U SOHC 34 kW (46 horsepower) engine, the R with the EN07D DOHC engine rated at 40 kW (54 horsepower) and the STi with an EN07X supercharged and intercooled engine rated at 47 kW (63 horsepower). The R1 is being marketed as a personal car and as a middle-aged couple's second car; a combination of leather and Alcantara seating is available. All R1s are equipped with a CVT, and all trim levels are available with front-wheel drive as well as four-wheel drive.

In its promotional materials, the R1 was frequently compared to the Subaru 360, the first production Subaru automobile.

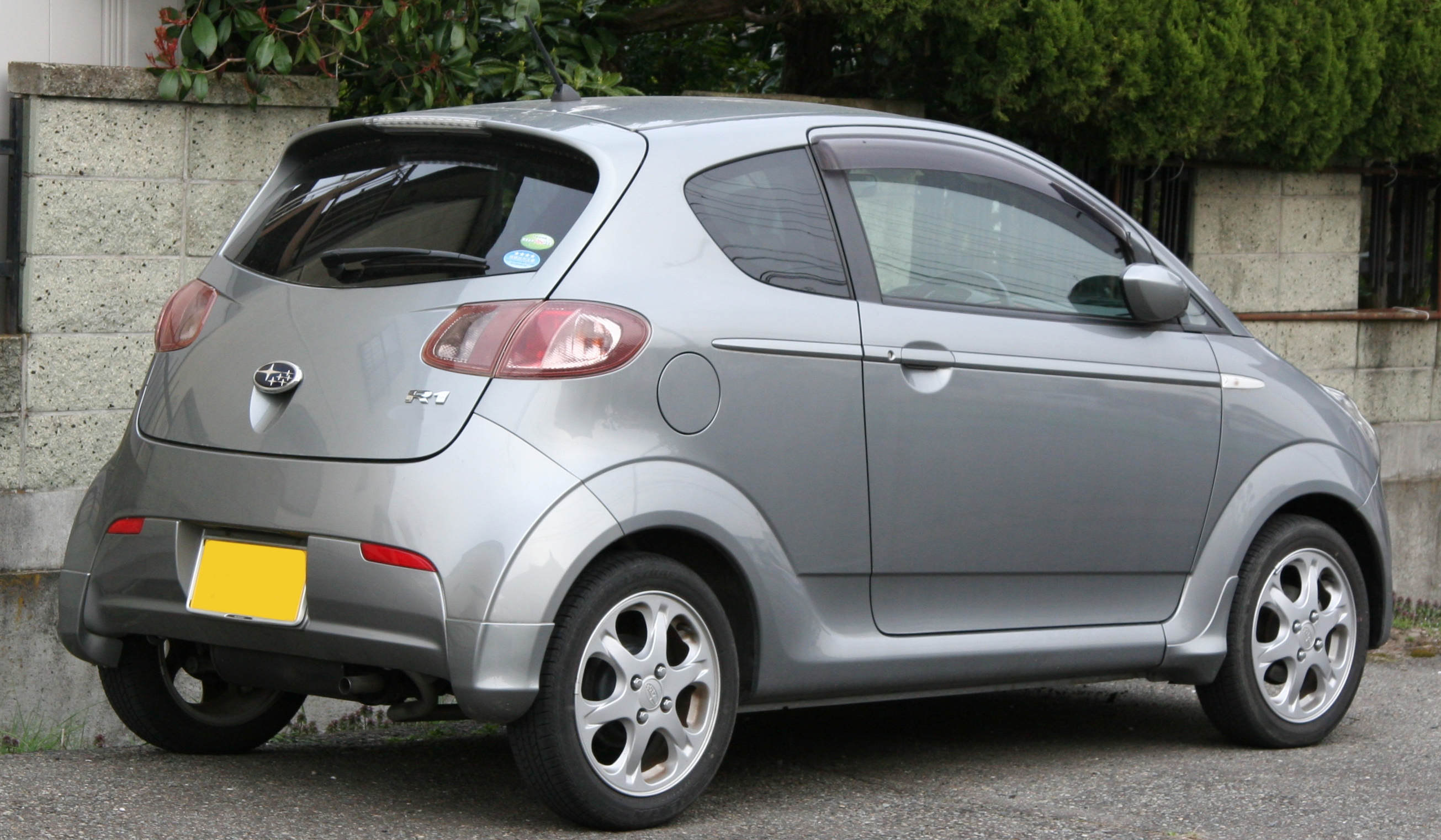
The rear of the R1

== Derivative vehicles ==
The R1 is the base car for the following vehicles:

- The Subaru R1e, an experimental battery electric vehicle undergoing limited production for selected industrial clients in Japan. There was intense interest in this vehicle within the US EV community, as it uses lithium-ion batteries (which contribute to a significant improvement in range and can be 80% recharged in just 15 minutes).
- The Prodrive P2 concept sports car.

== Collectibles ==
Tomica manufactured a diecast 1/56 R1 in 2005 as No. 111, and Takara made a Choro-Q plastic pull-back R1. There's also a Norev model at scale 1:43.
