= List of Subaru vehicles =

Subaru has designed, assembled and/or sold the following vehicles:

== Current models ==
Body style	Model			Current generation			Vehicle description
Body style	Image	Name(s)	Introduction (cal. year)	Introduction (cal. year)	Facelift	Main markets	Vehicle description
Sports car		BRZ	2012	2021	—	Global	Front-engine, rear-wheel drive two-door 2+2 sports car. Also sold by Toyota as the GR86.
Hatchback		Impreza	1992	2022	—	Global	Compact hatchback.
Sedan		WRX	1992	2021	—	Global	Compact Rally car, as seen in the 2005 World Rally Championship.
Station wagon		Levorg/ WRX Wagon	2014	2020	—	Asia	Mid-size station wagon based on the Impreza and WRX. Also known as the WRX Sportswagon in Australia and WRX GT in New Zealand since 2021.
Station wagon		Levorg Layback	2023	2023	—	Japan	Compact crossover-styled station wagon based on Levorg.
SUV/ crossover		Ascent/ Evoltis	2019	2019	2022	North America	Three-row mid-size crossover SUV, Subaru's largest SUV and the successor of the Tribeca.
SUV/ crossover		Crosstrek	2012	2023	—	Global	Subcompact crossover SUV based on the Impreza. Formerly called XV in most international markets between 2012 and 2022.
SUV/ crossover		Forester	1997	2024	—	Global	Compact crossover SUV.
SUV/ crossover		Getaway	2026	2026	—	North America	Battery electric three-row mid-size crossover SUV. Jointly developed with Toyota, Also called Toyota Highlander BEV.
SUV/ crossover		Outback	1994 (nameplate); 2025 (as a crossover)	2025	—	Global	Mid-size crossover SUV, previously a raised wagon.
SUV/ crossover		Rex	1972 (nameplate); 2022 (as a crossover)	2022	—	Japan	Subcompact crossover SUV sold exclusively in Japan. Rebadged A200 series Daihatsu Rocky.
SUV/ crossover		Solterra	2022	2022	2025	Global	Battery electric compact crossover SUV. Jointly developed with Toyota, Also called Toyota bZ4X.
SUV/ crossover		Trailseeker/ E-Outback	2025	2025	—	Global	Battery electric two-row mid-size crossover SUV. Jointly developed with Toyota, Also called Toyota bZ4X Touring.
SUV/ crossover		Uncharted	2025	2025	—	Global	Battery electric compact crossover SUV. Jointly developed with Toyota, Also called Toyota C-HR+.
MPV/ minivan		Justy (minivan)	1984 (nameplate)	2016 (as a minivan)	—	Japan	Subcompact minivan with sliding doors only sold in Japan. Rebadged Daihatsu Thor.
Kei vehicles		Chiffon	2013	2019	2022	Japan	Tall-height wagon kei car with rear sliding doors. Rebadged Daihatsu Tanto.
Kei vehicles		Pleo Plus	2011	2017	—	Japan	Low-roof hatchback kei car with hinged rear doors. Rebadged Daihatsu Mira e:S.
Kei vehicles		Stella	2006	2025	—	Japan	Tall-height wagon kei car with rear sliding doors. Rebadged Daihatsu Move.
Kei vehicles		Sambar Truck	1961	2014	2022	Japan	Cabover kei truck. Rebadged Daihatsu Hijet Truck since 2012.
Kei vehicles		Sambar Van	1961	2022	—	Japan	Cabover cargo microvan with rear sliding doors. Rebadged Daihatsu Hijet Cargo since 2012.
Kei vehicles		Sambar Dias	1999	2022	—	Japan	Cabover passenger microvan with rear sliding doors. Rebadged Daihatsu Atrai passenger van. Formerly known as the Dias Wagon until 2020.

== Former models ==
Image	Model	Introduced	Discontinued	Notes
	360/460	1958	1971	
	1000	1966	1969	
	1500	1954	1954	
	Alcyone/SVX	1991	1996	
	Baja	2002	2006	
	Bighorn	1988	1992	Rebadge Isuzu Trooper
	BRAT/Brumby/MV	1978	1994	
	Dex	2006	2012	rebadged Daihatsu Materia
	Exiga	2008	2018	
	FF-1 G (1971–1972)	1971	1972	
	FF-1 Star (1969–1973)	1969	1973	
	Legacy	1989	2025	
	Leone	1971	1994	
	Leone Van	1999	2001	rebadge Nissan AD
	Lucra	2010	2015	rebadged Daihatsu Tanto Exe
	Outback Sport/Gravel Express/RV	1994	2012	Crossover version of Subaru Impreza Hatchback
	Pleo	1998	2018	rebadge Daihatsu Mira
	R-2	1969	1972	
	R1	2005	2010	
	R2	2003	2010	
	Rex	1972	1992	
	Sumo/Libera/Domingo/Columbuss/E series/Estratto	1983	1999	
	Traviq	1999	2005	rebadged Opel Zafira
	Trezia	2010	2016	Rebadged Toyota Ractis
	Tribeca	2005	2014	
	Vivio	1992	1998	
	Alcyone XT/Vortex	1985	1991	

== Concepts ==
- Subaru ACX-II (1985, based on the Alcyone; entered production as the XT6)
- Subaru F-9X (1985)
- Subaru BLT (1987)
- Subaru F-624 Estremo (1987)
- Subaru Jo-Car (1987)
- Subaru SVX (1989, entered production as the Alcyone SVX)
- Subaru SRD-1 (Experimental design study introduced in 1990)
- Subaru Amadeus (1991, shooting-brake version of the SVX)
- Subaru CM1 (1991)
- Subaru Hanako (1991)
- Subaru Rioma (1991)
- Subaru Jusmin (1993)
- Subaru Sagres (1993)
- Subaru Suiren (1993, concept replacement for the BRAT/Brumby)
- Subaru Alpha-Exiga (1995)
- Subaru Elcapa (1995)
- Subaru Streega (1995, entered production as the Forester)
- Subaru Exiga (1996, wagon)
- Subaru Elten (1997)
- Subaru Elten Custom (1999)
- Subaru Fleet-X (1999)
- Subaru ST-X (2000)
- Subaru HM-01 (2001)
- Subaru WX-01 (2001)
- Subaru B11S (2003)
- Subaru B9 Scrambler (2003)
- Subaru R1e (2003)
- Subaru B5 TPH (2005, Turbo Parallel Hybrid) (Japanese: Subaru B5-TPH)
- Subaru G4e (2007)
- Subaru Hybrid & Advanced Tourer (2009, 2011)
- Subaru VIZIV (2013-2019)
- Subaru STI E-RA (2022)
- Subaru Sport Mobility (2023)
- Subaru Air Mobility (2023)
- Subaru Performance-B STI (2025)
- Subaru Performance-E STI (2025)
- Subaru HS500
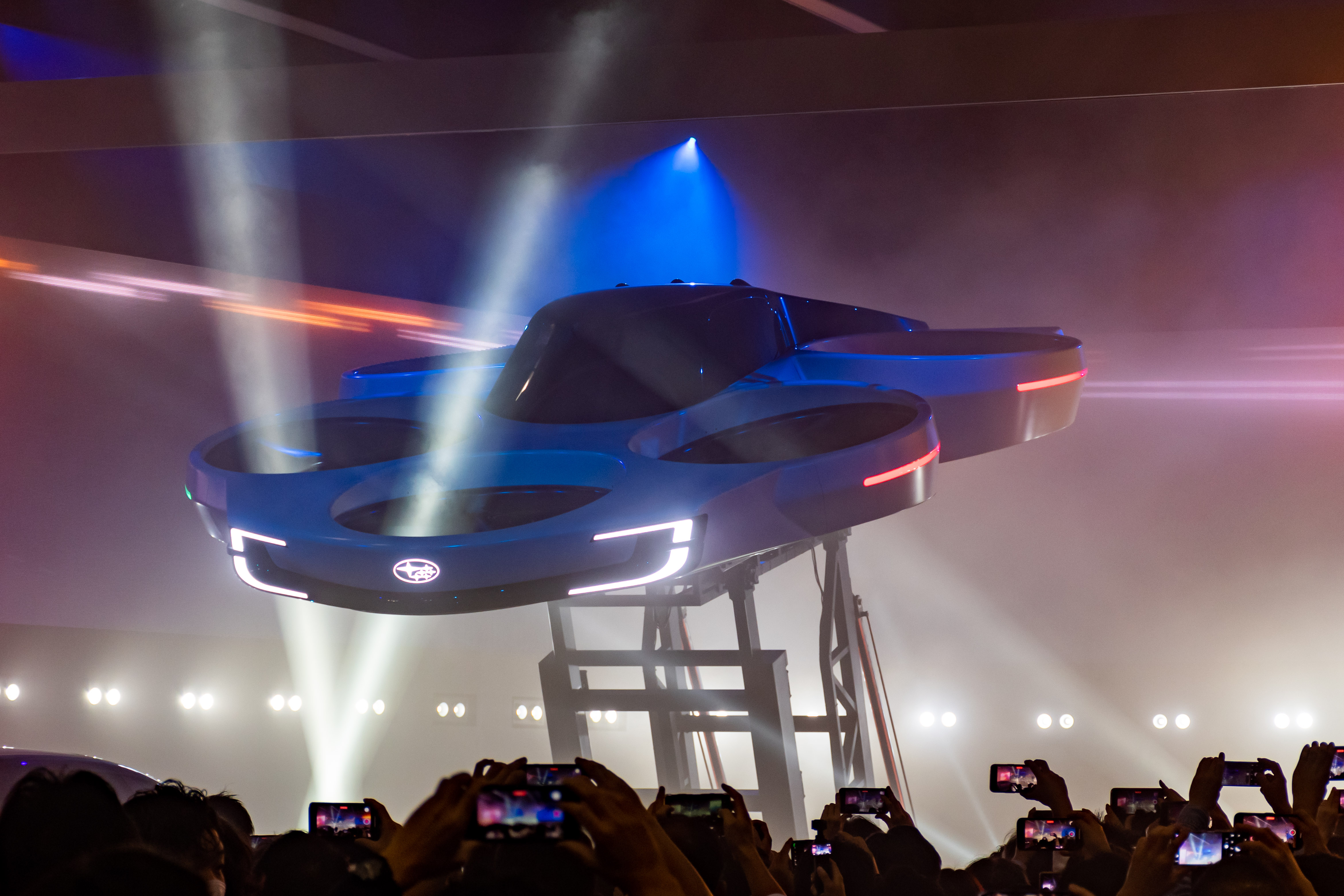
Air Mobility

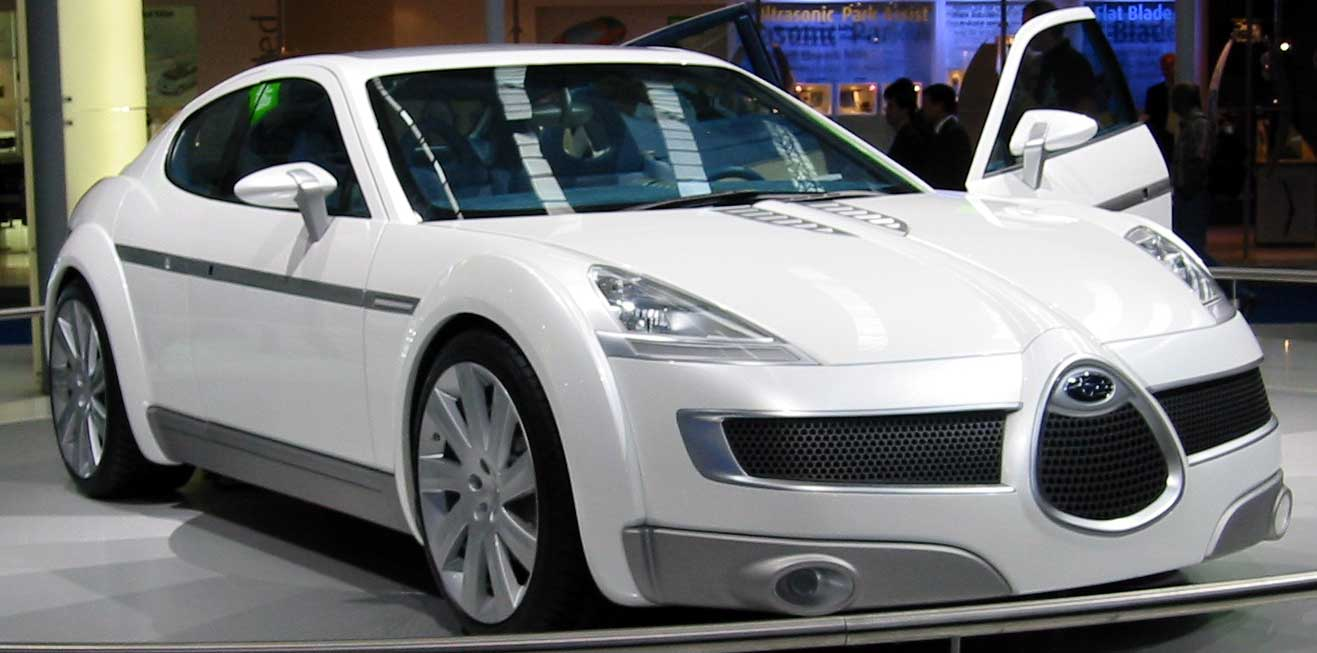
B11S Concept

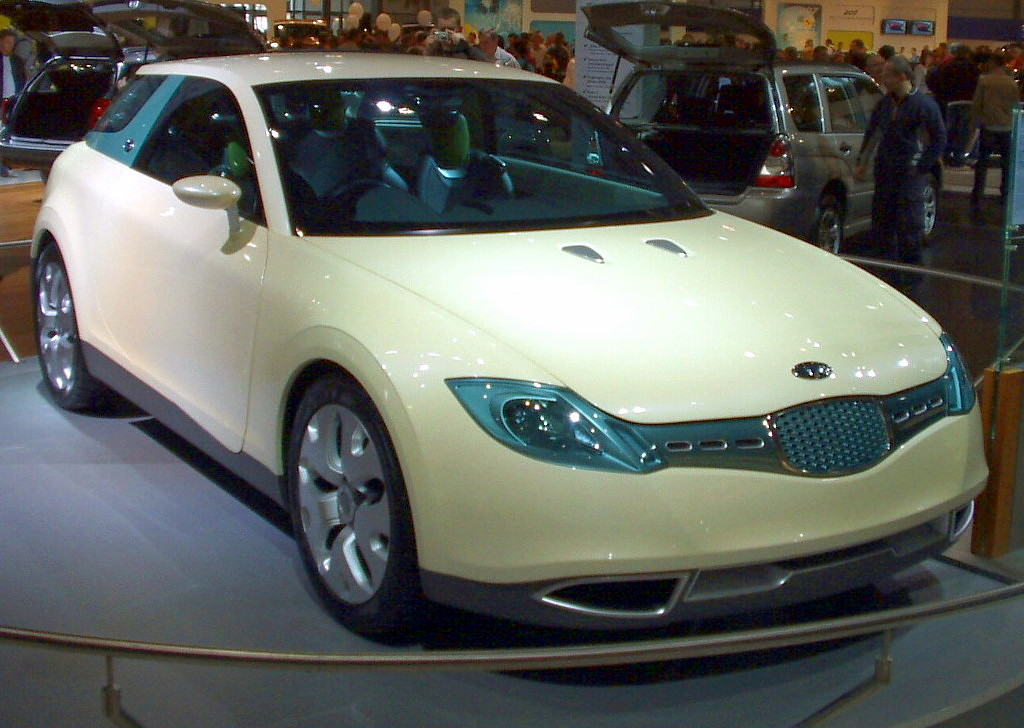
B5 TPH

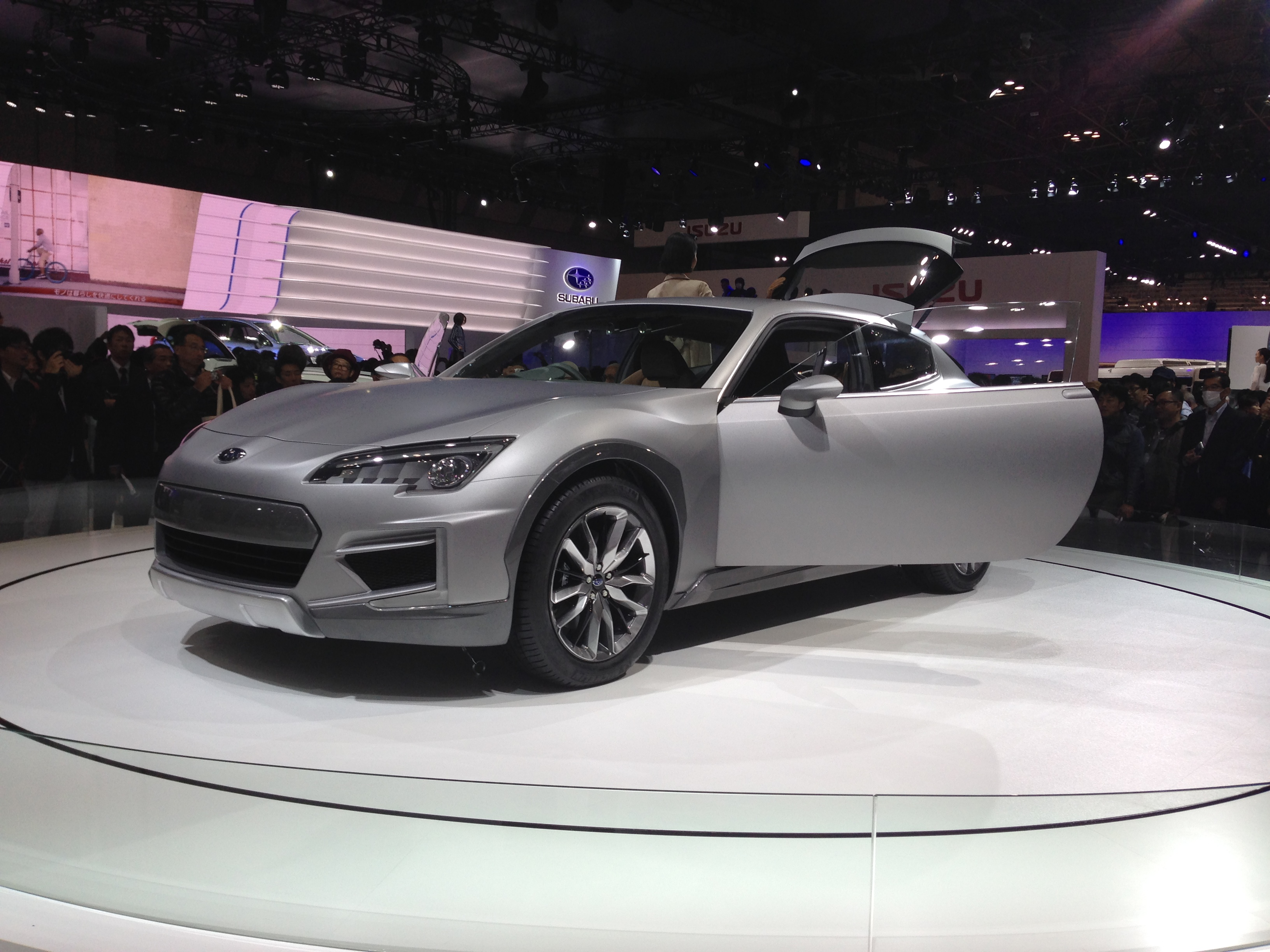
Cross Sport Design

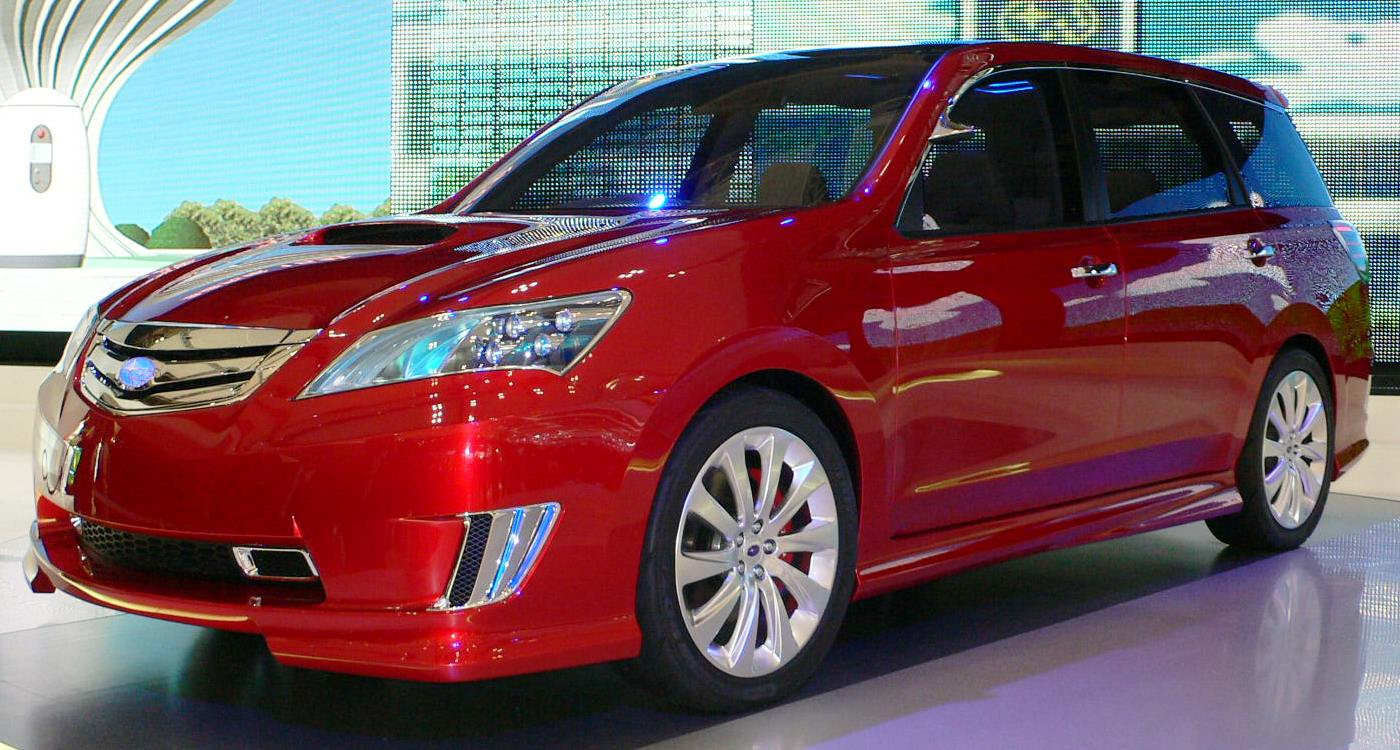
Exiga Concept

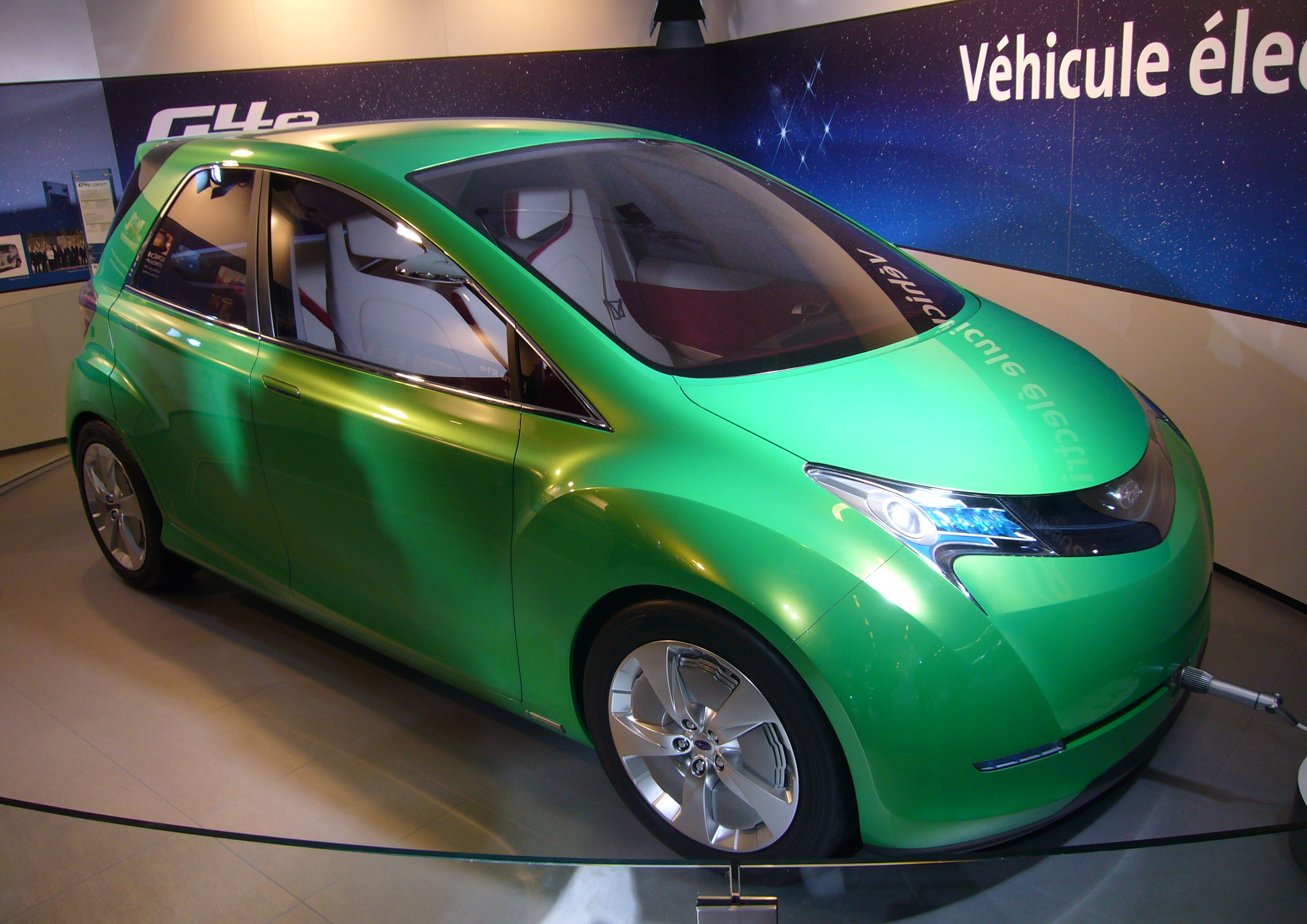
G4e

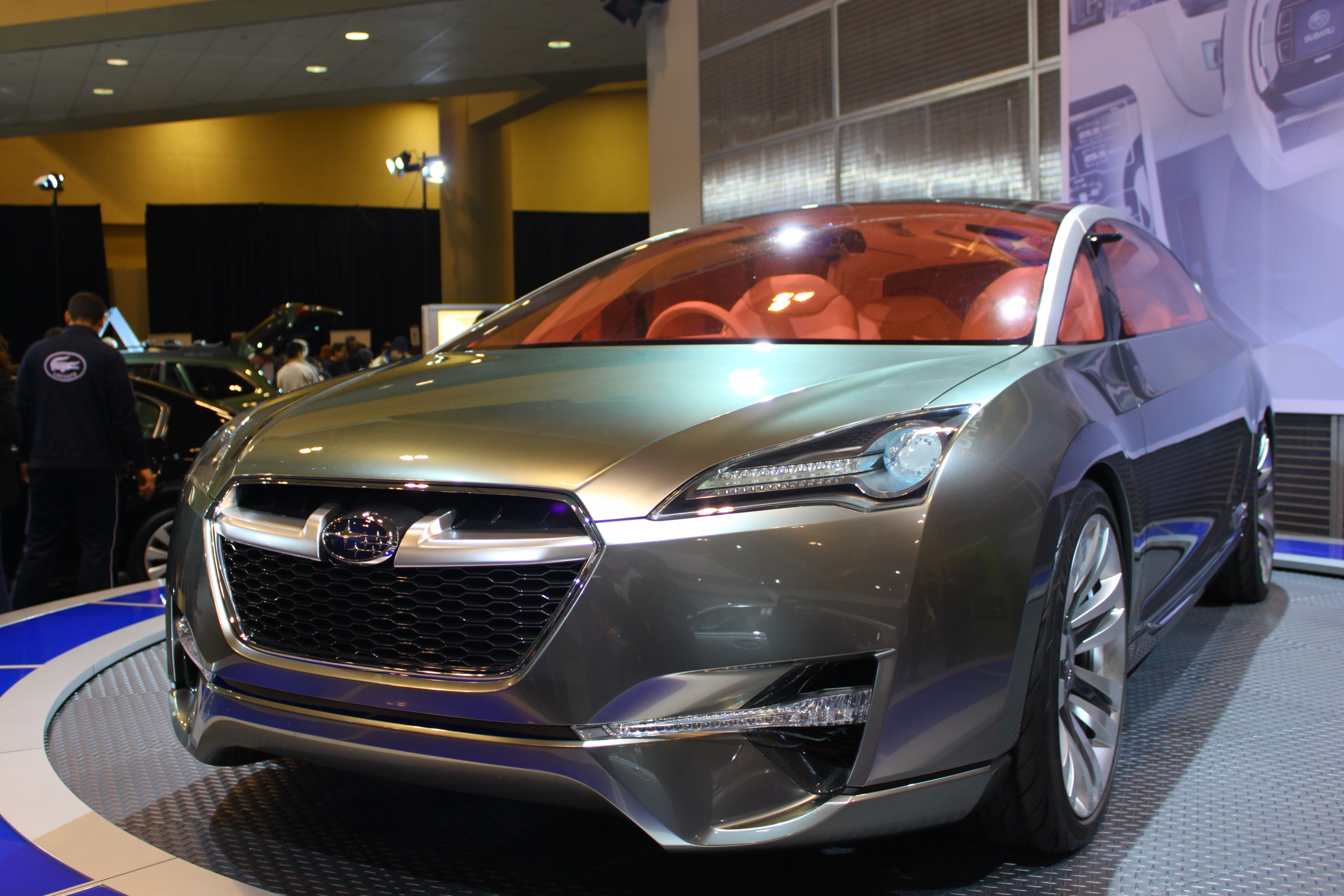
Hybrid Tourer

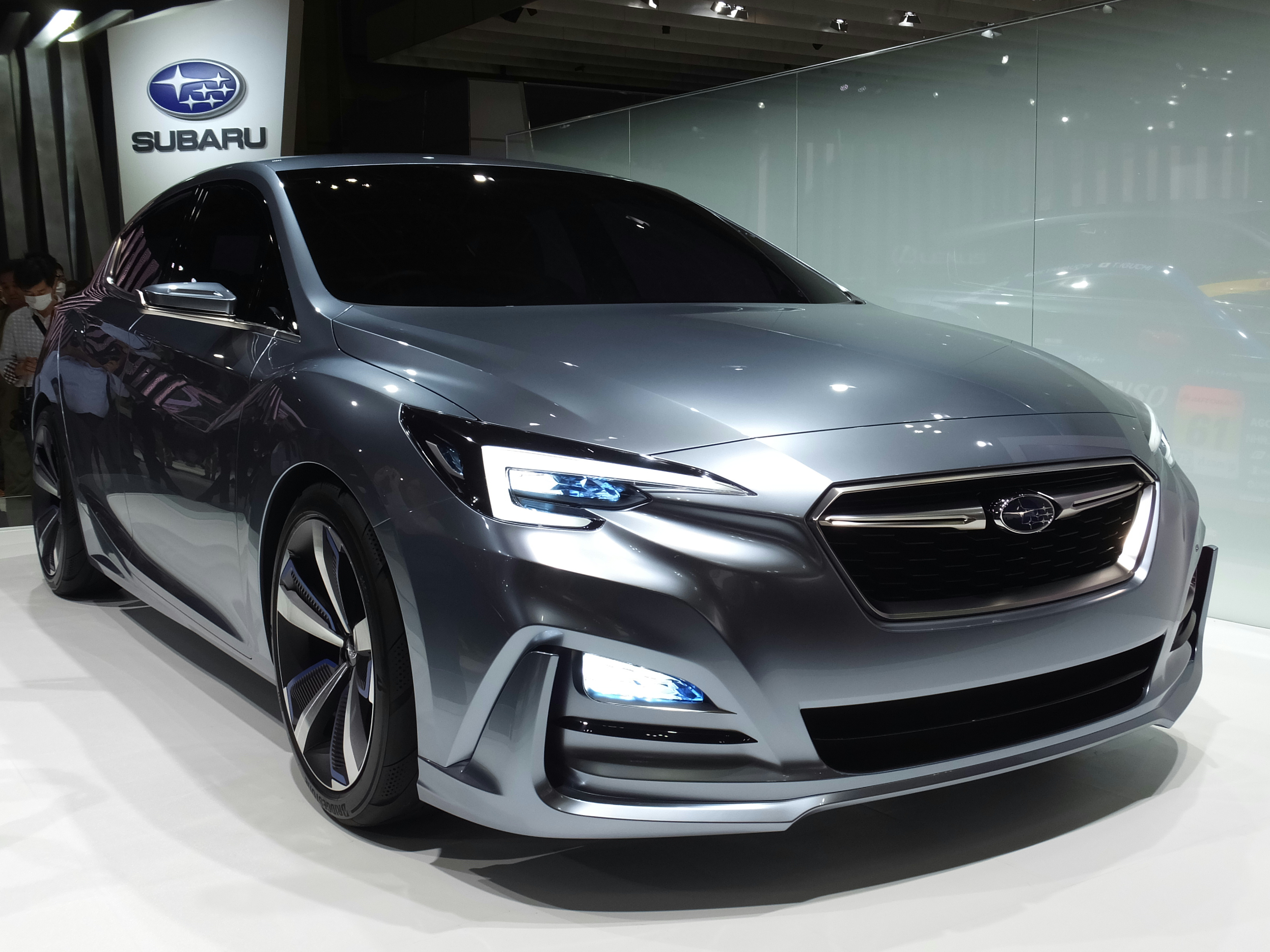
Impreza 5-Door Concept

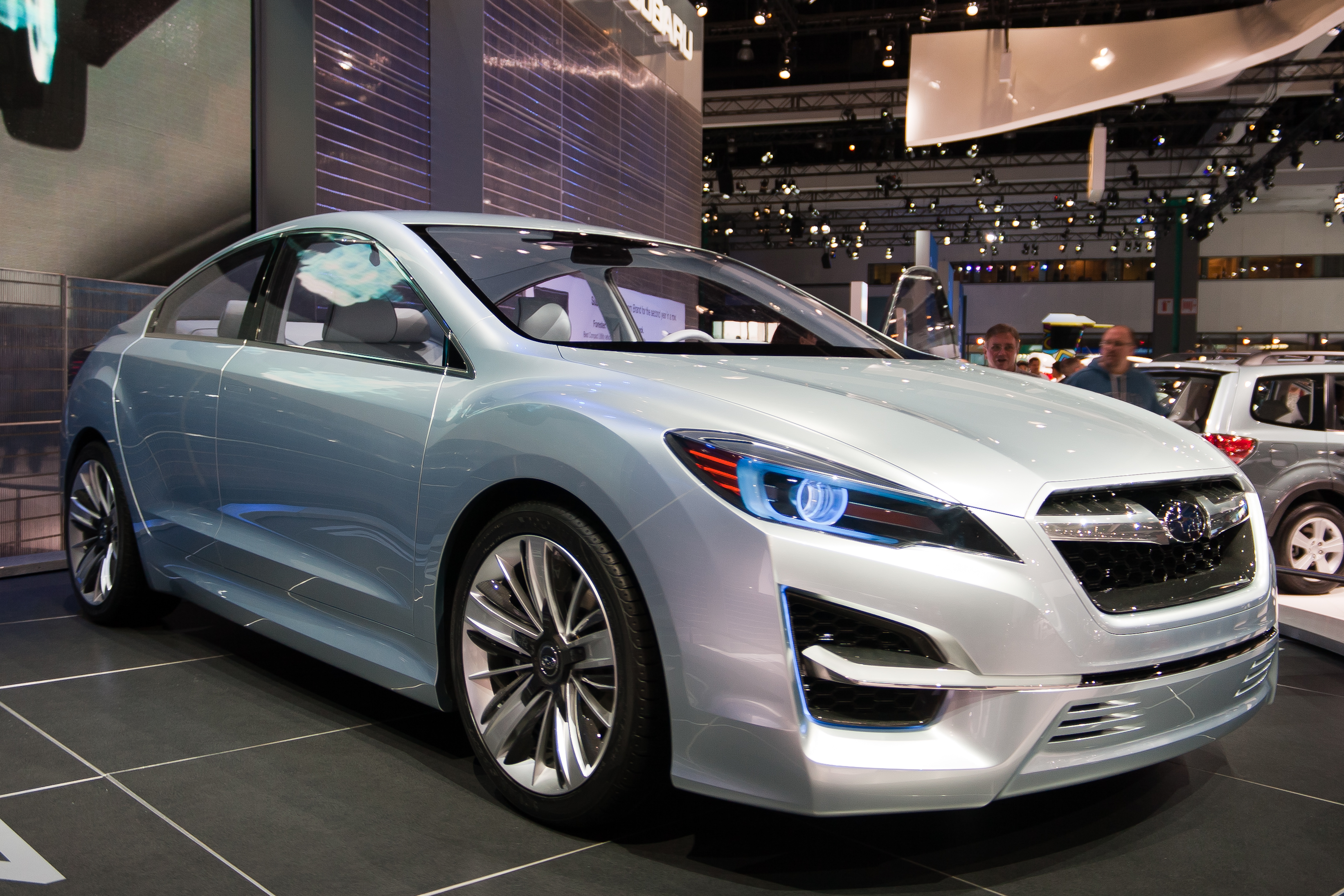
Impreza Design Concept

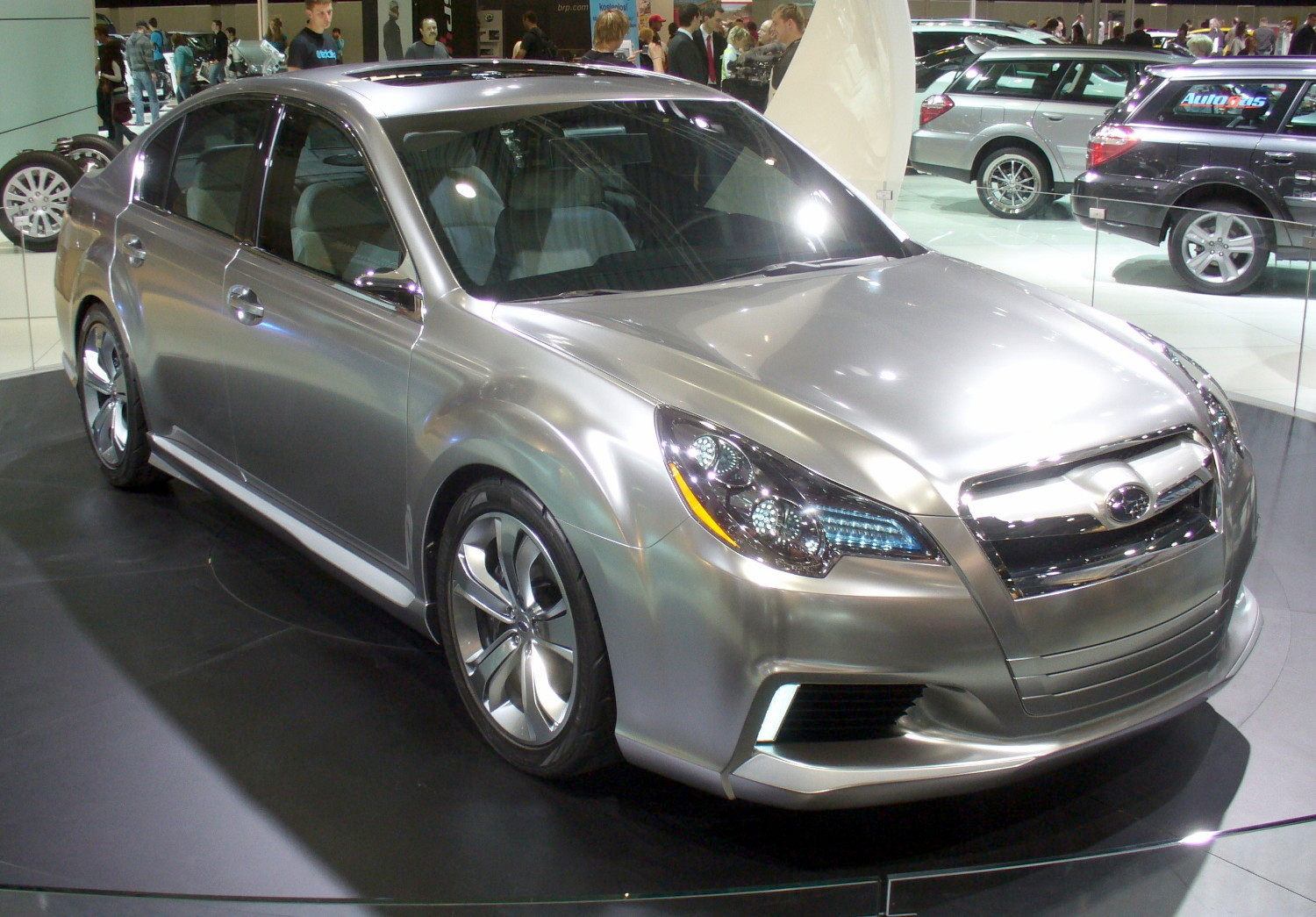
Legacy Concept

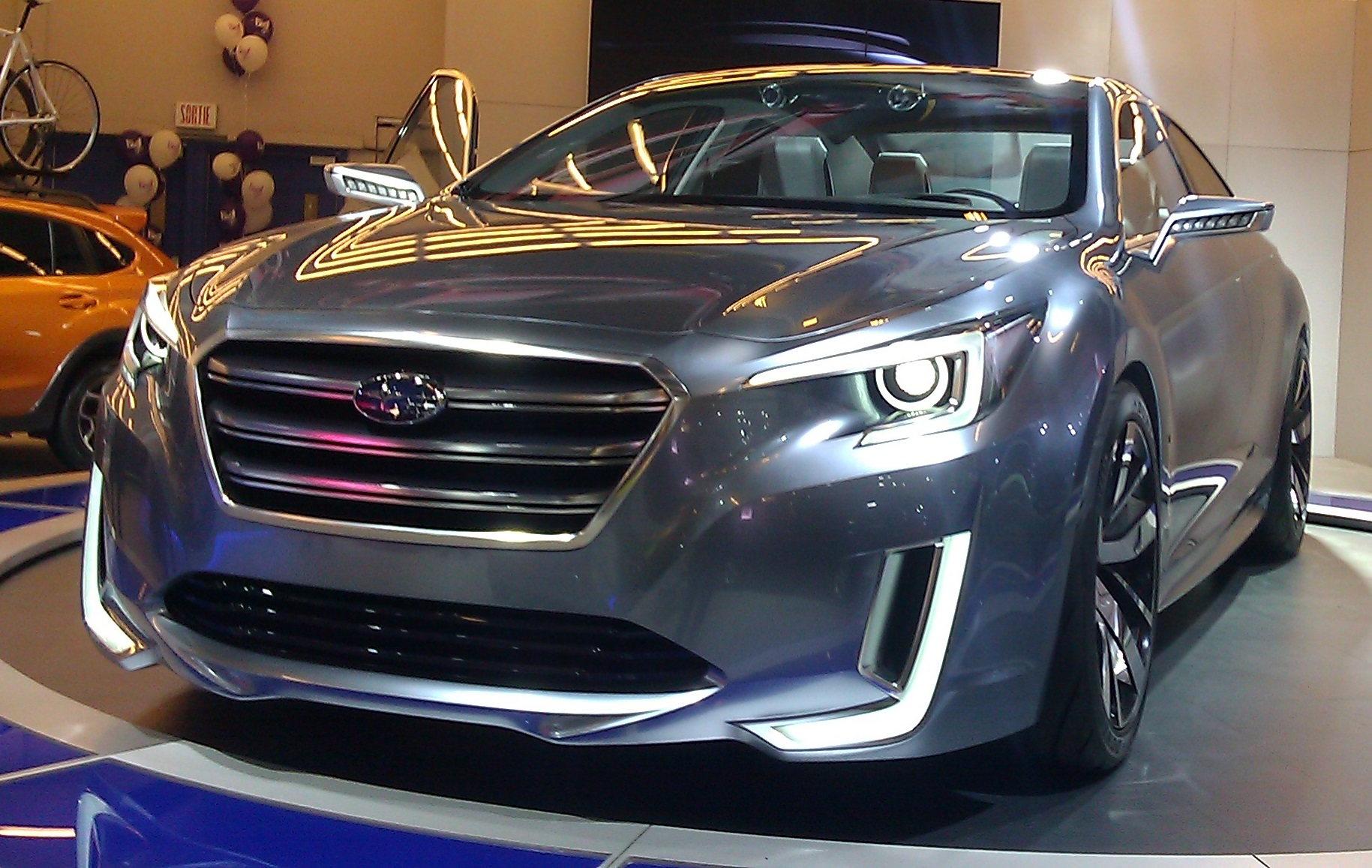
Legacy Concept

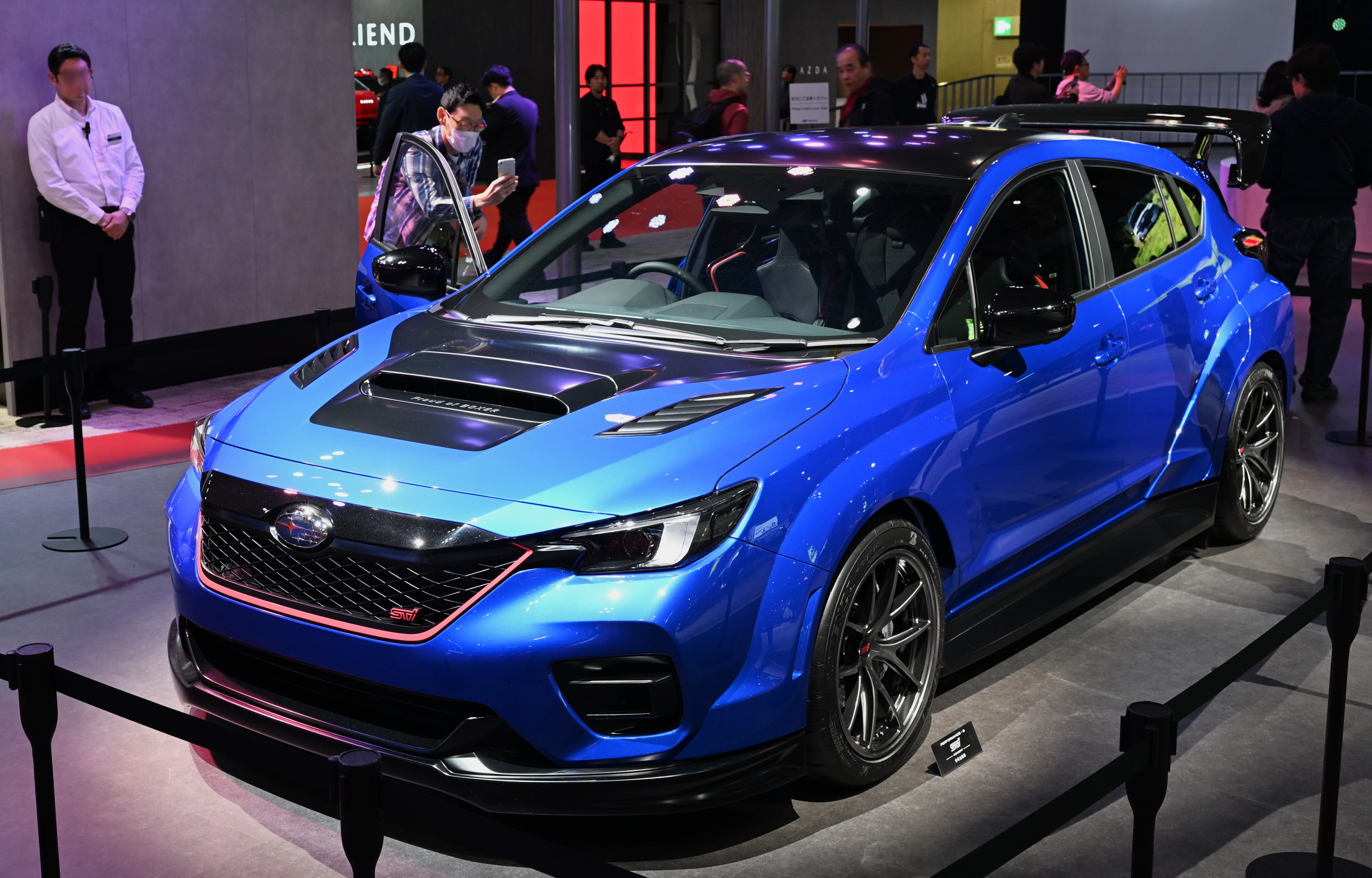
Performance-B STI

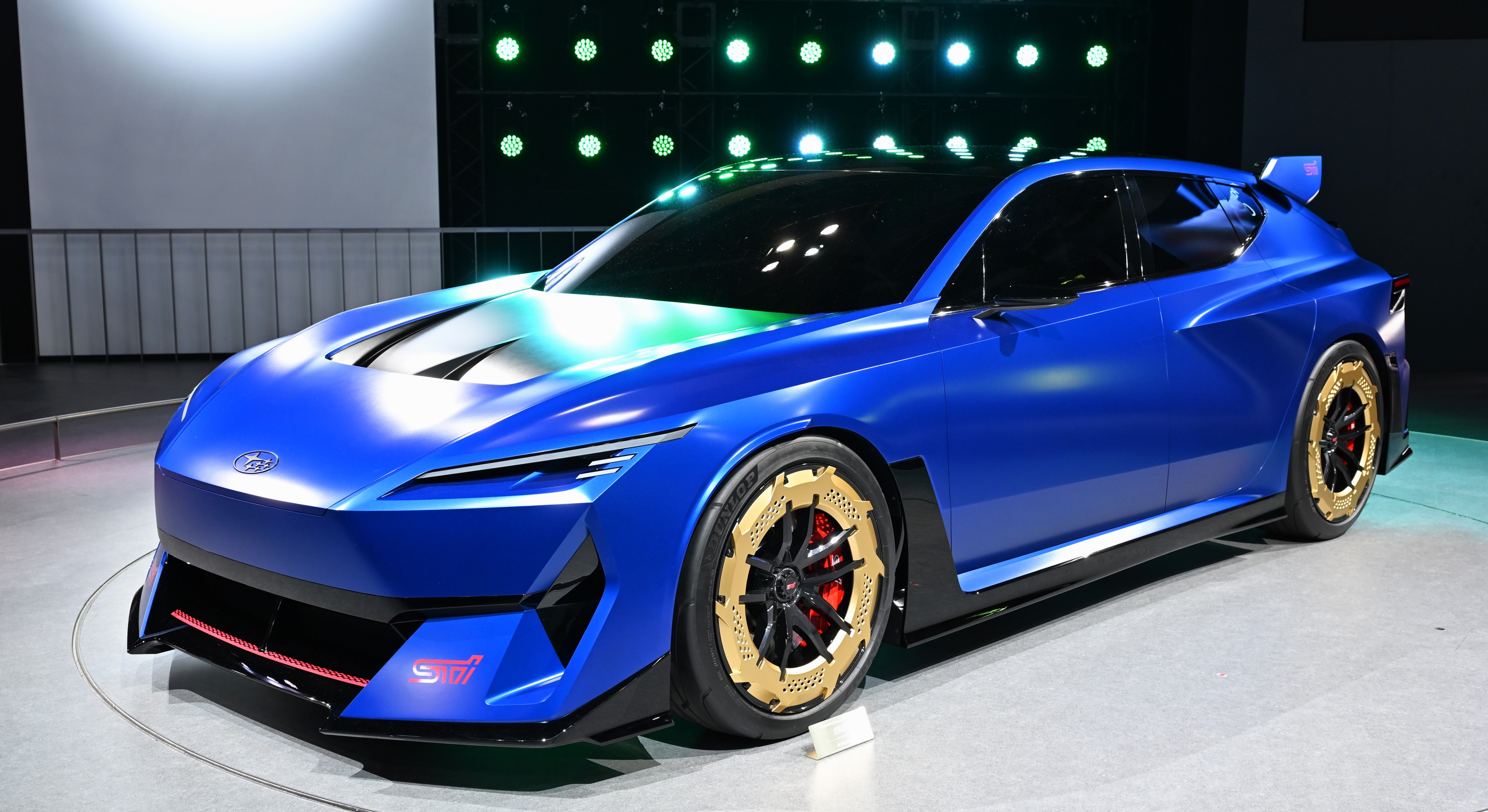
Performance-E STI

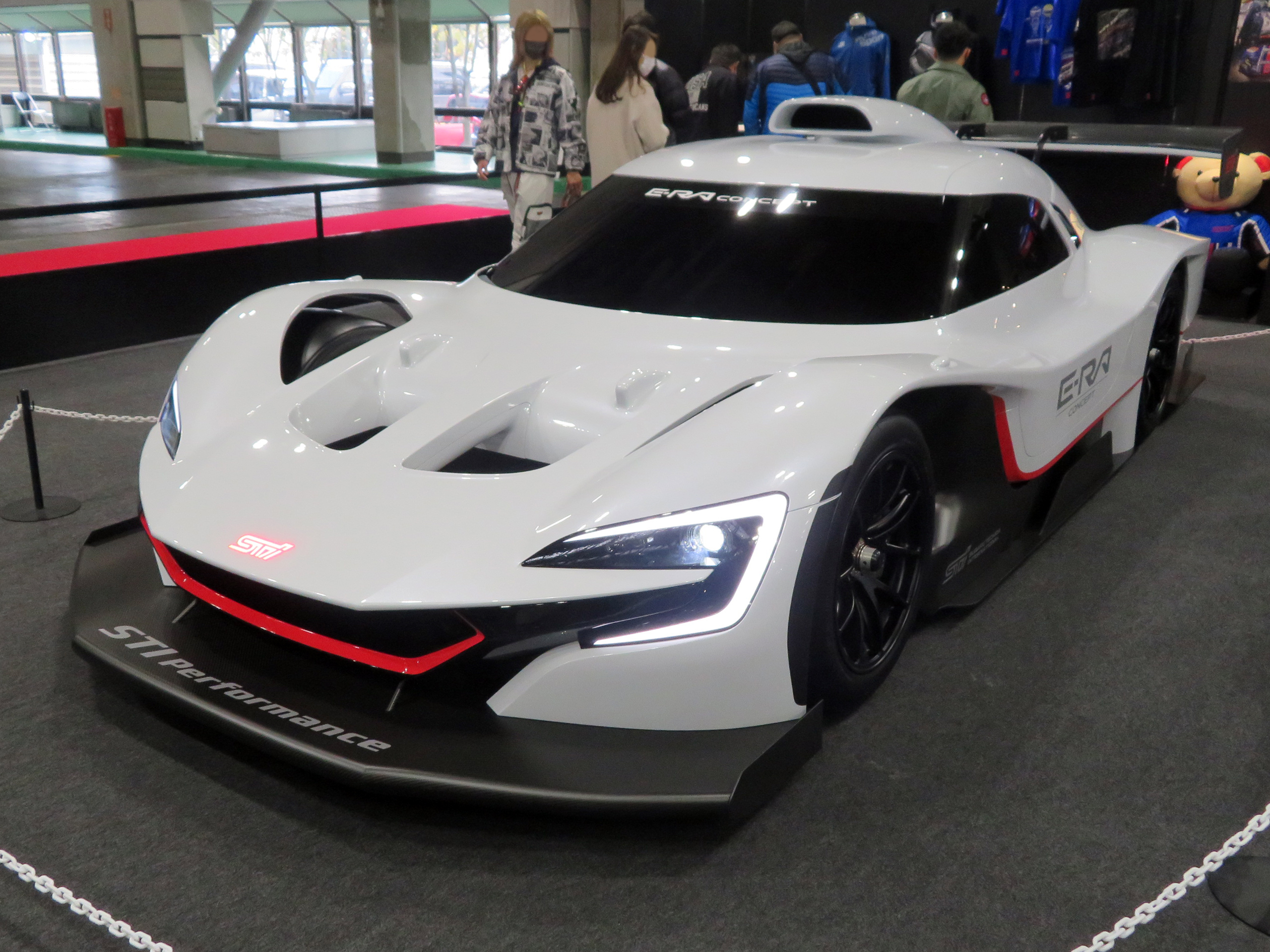
STI E-RA

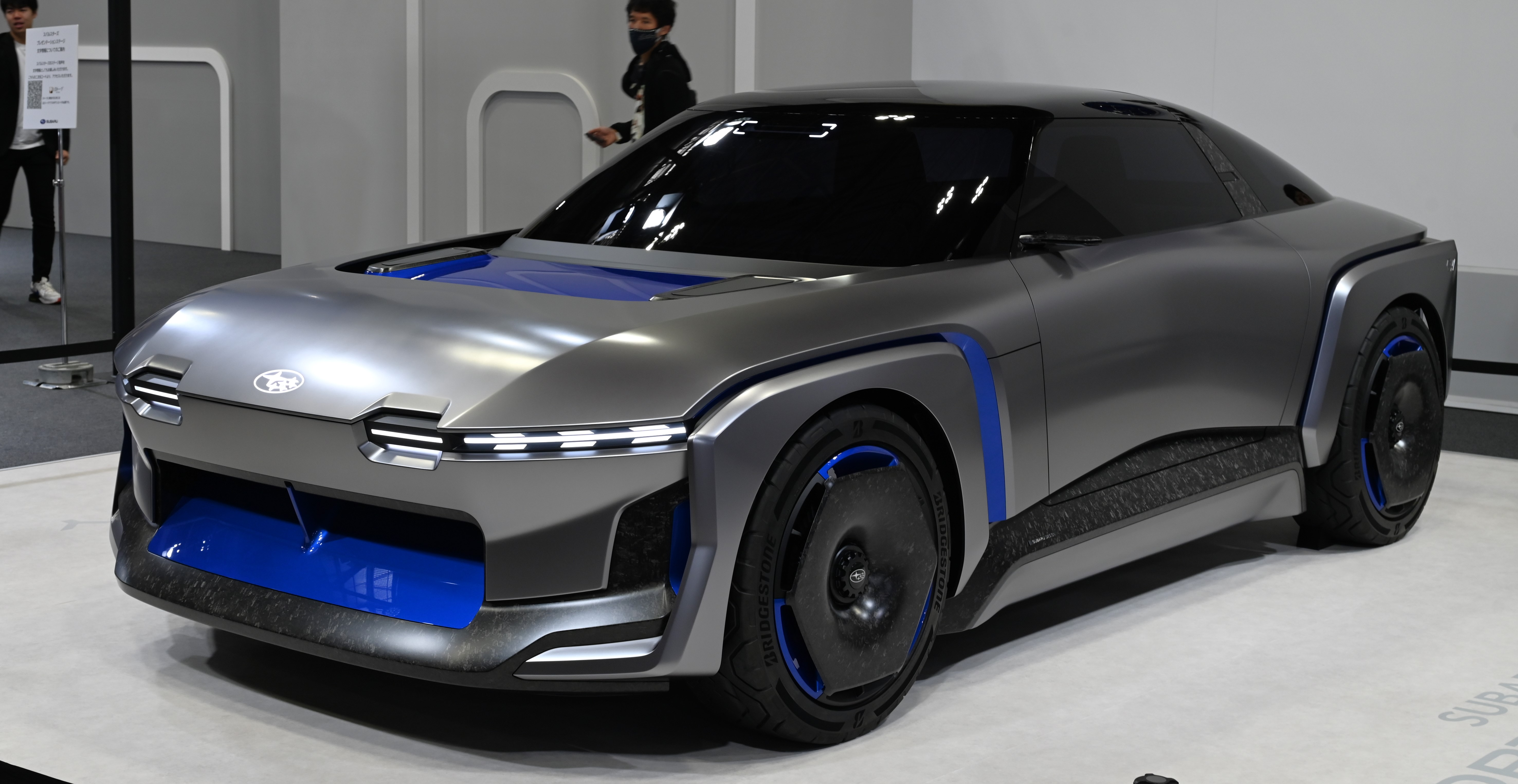
Sport Mobility

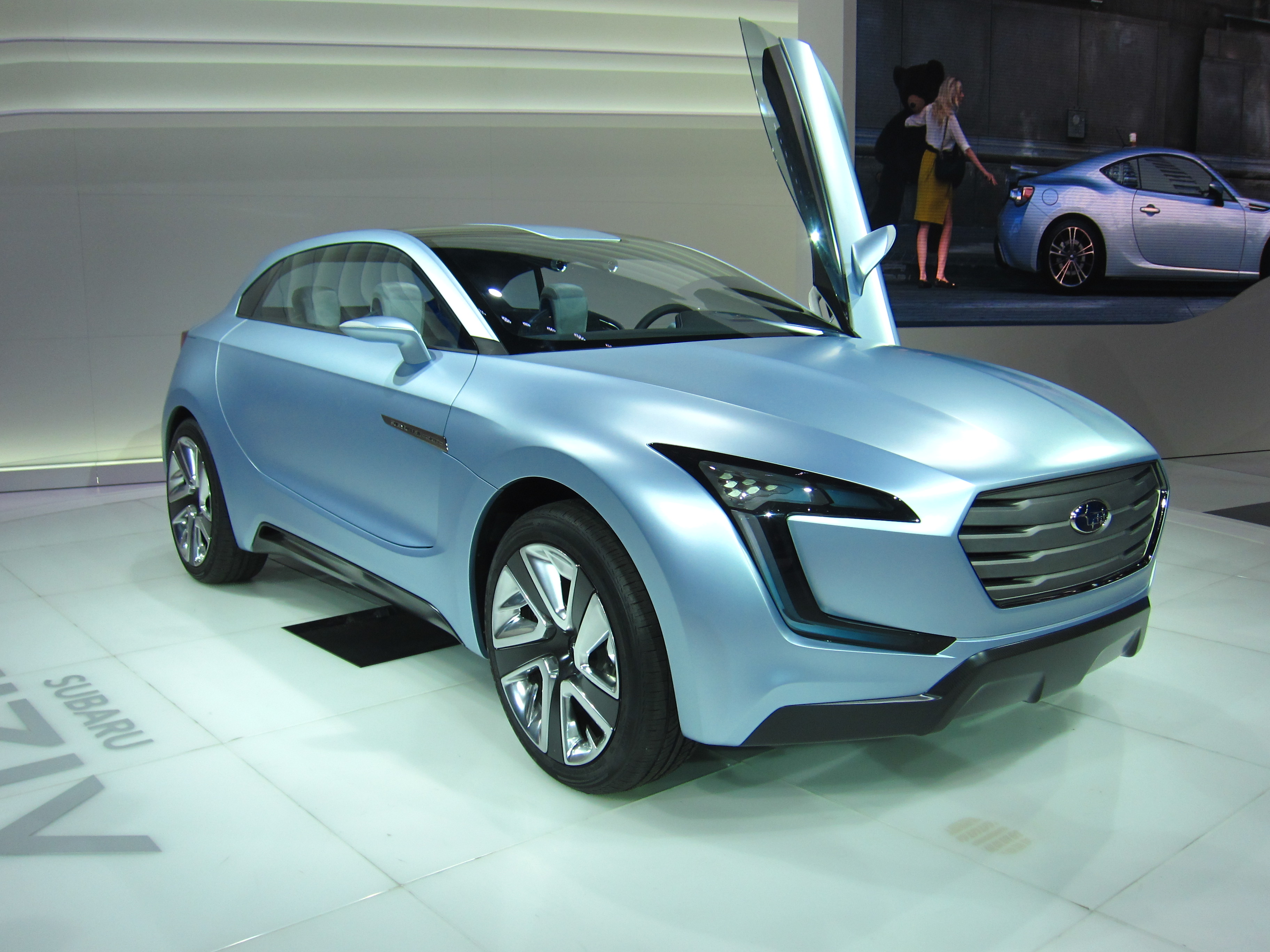
Viziv

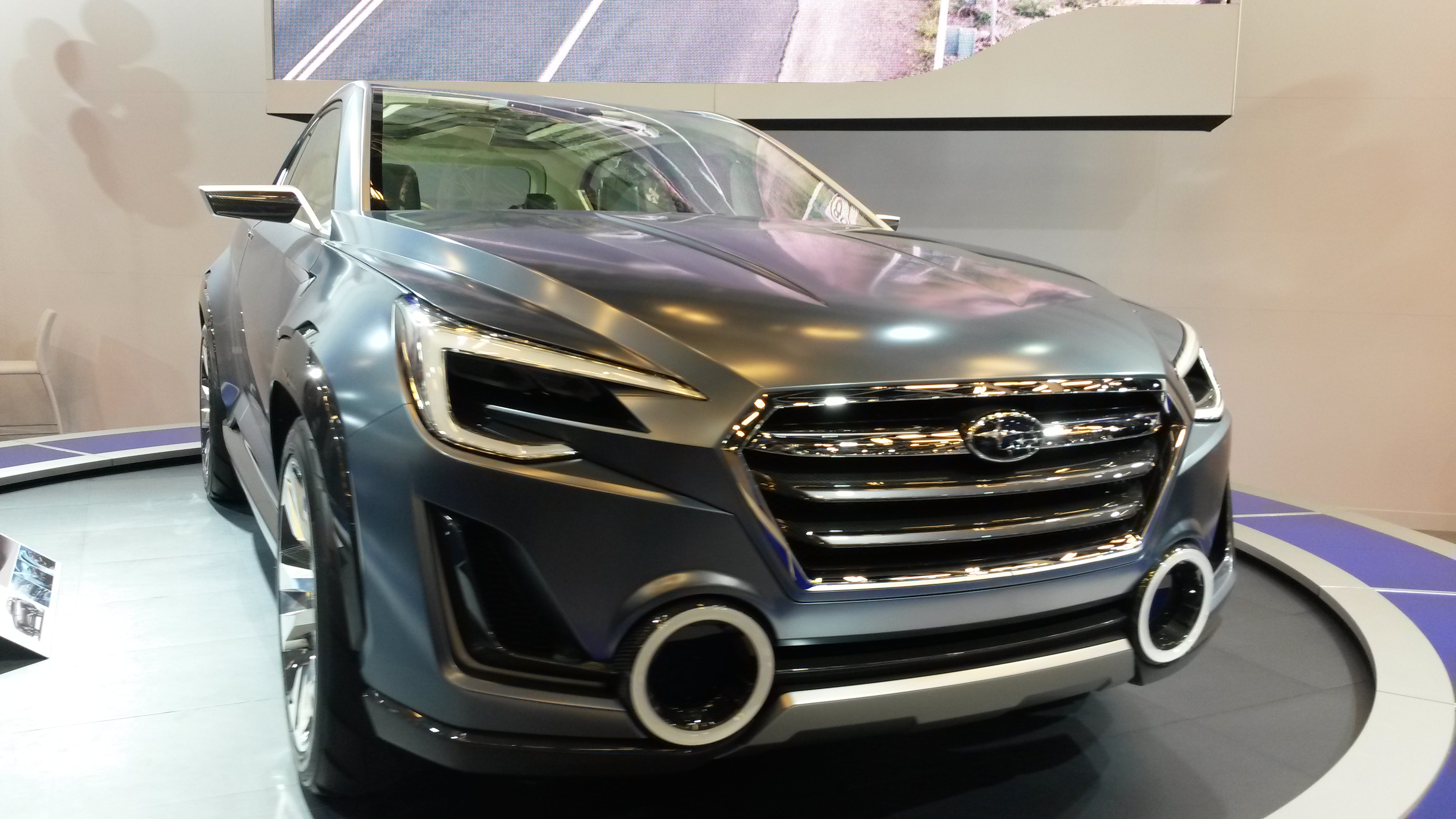
Viziv 2

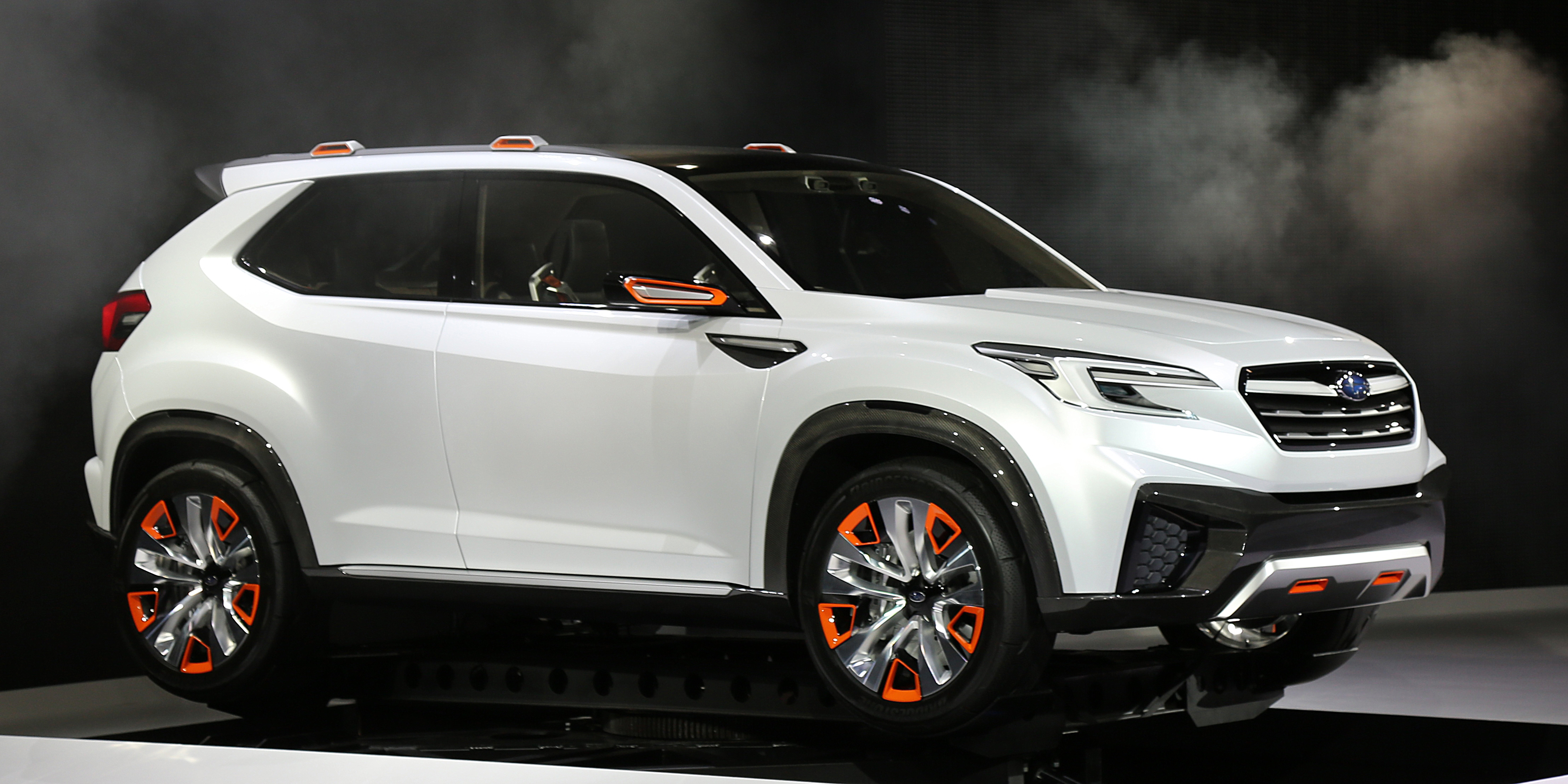
Viziv Future

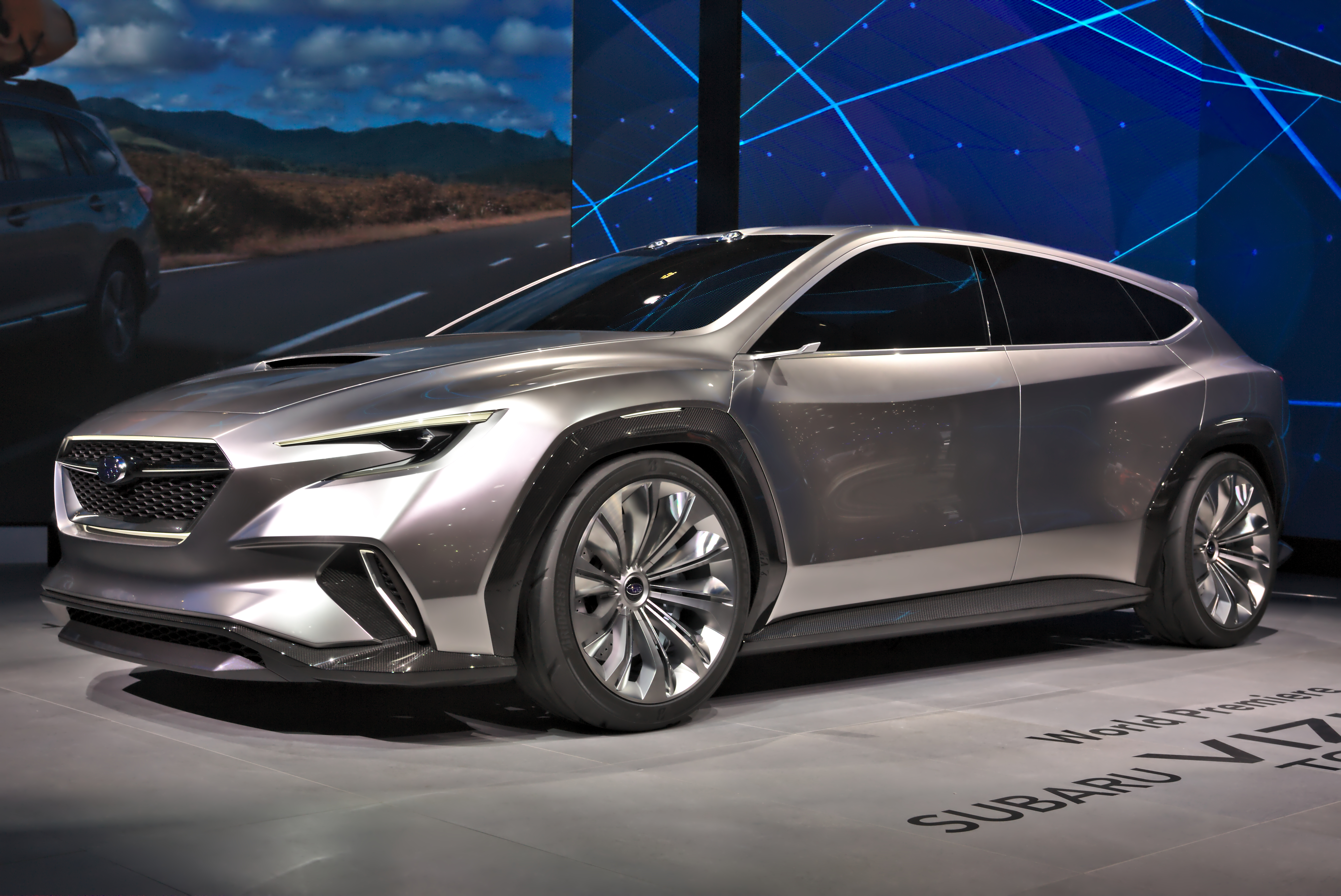
Viziv Concept Tourer

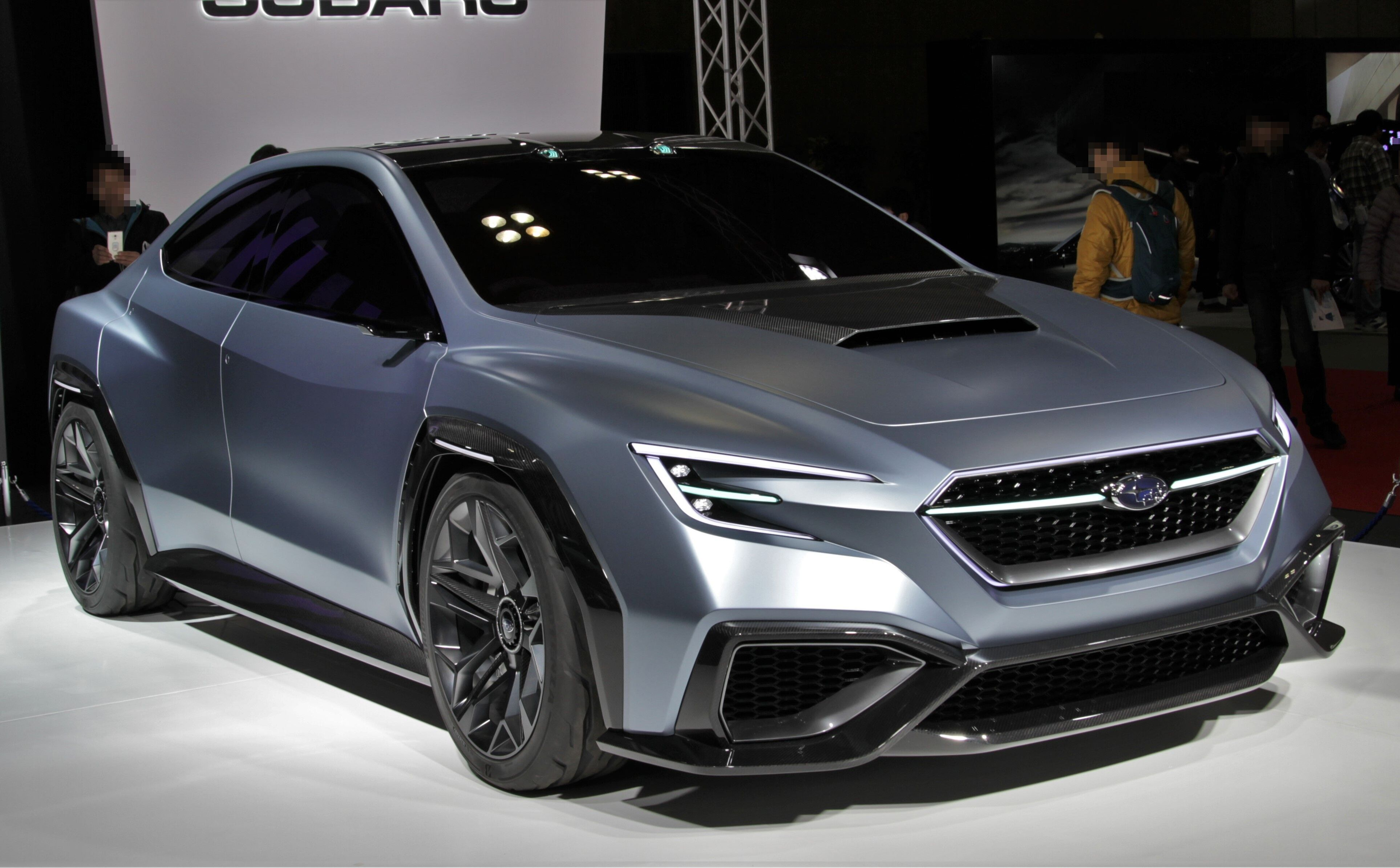
Viziv Performance

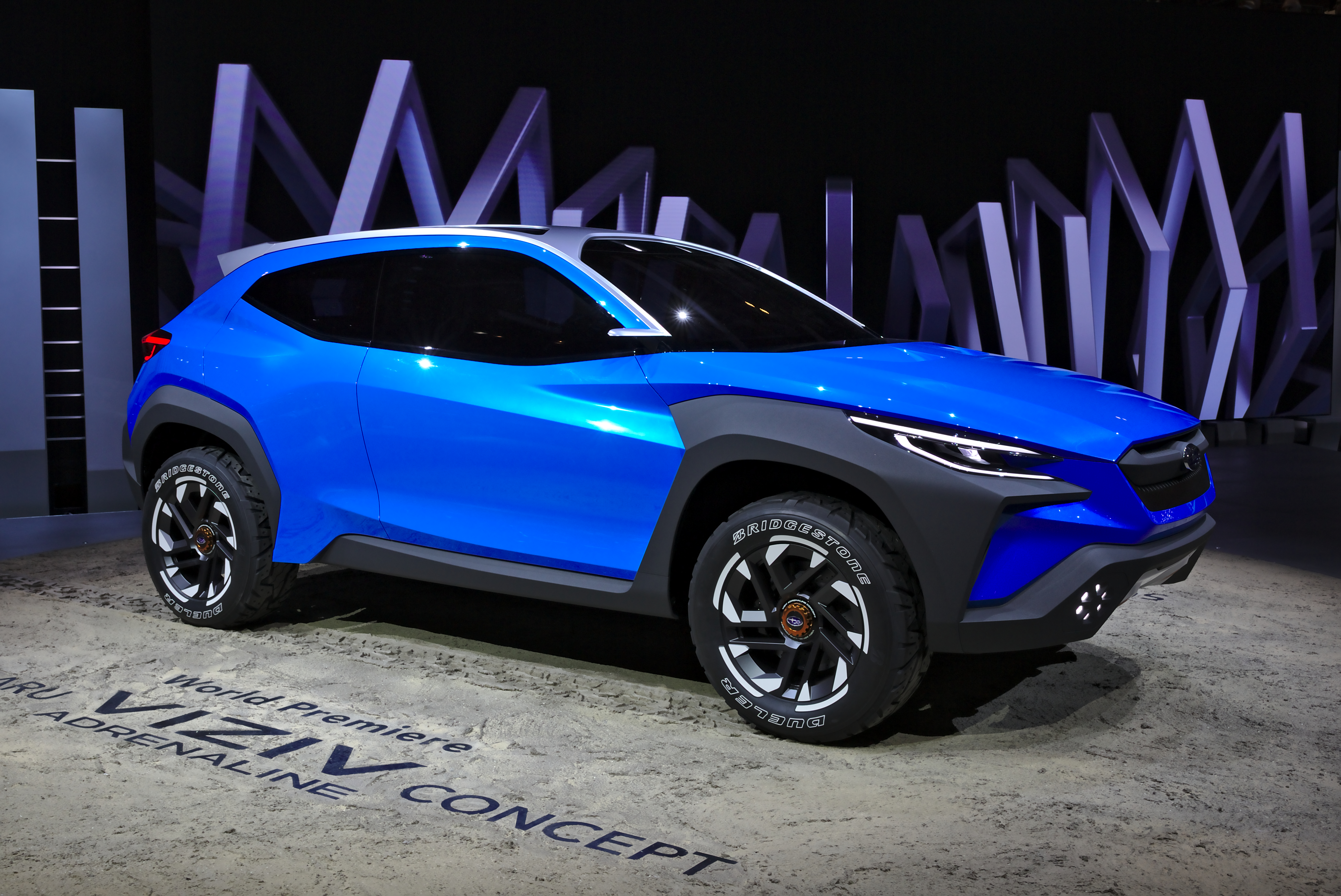
Viziv Adrenaline

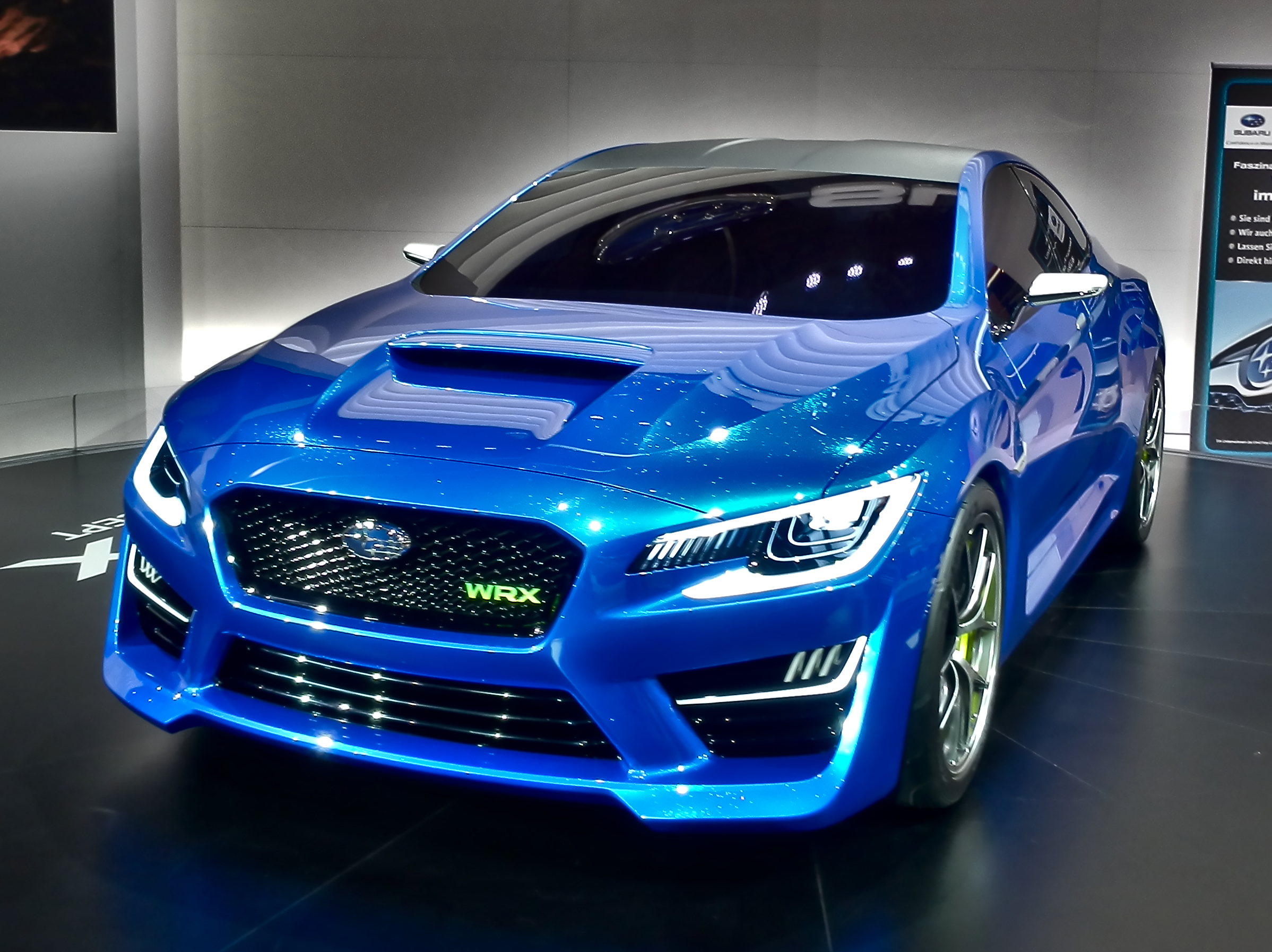
WRX Concept
