= Toyota C-HR+ =

Battery electric compact crossover SUV

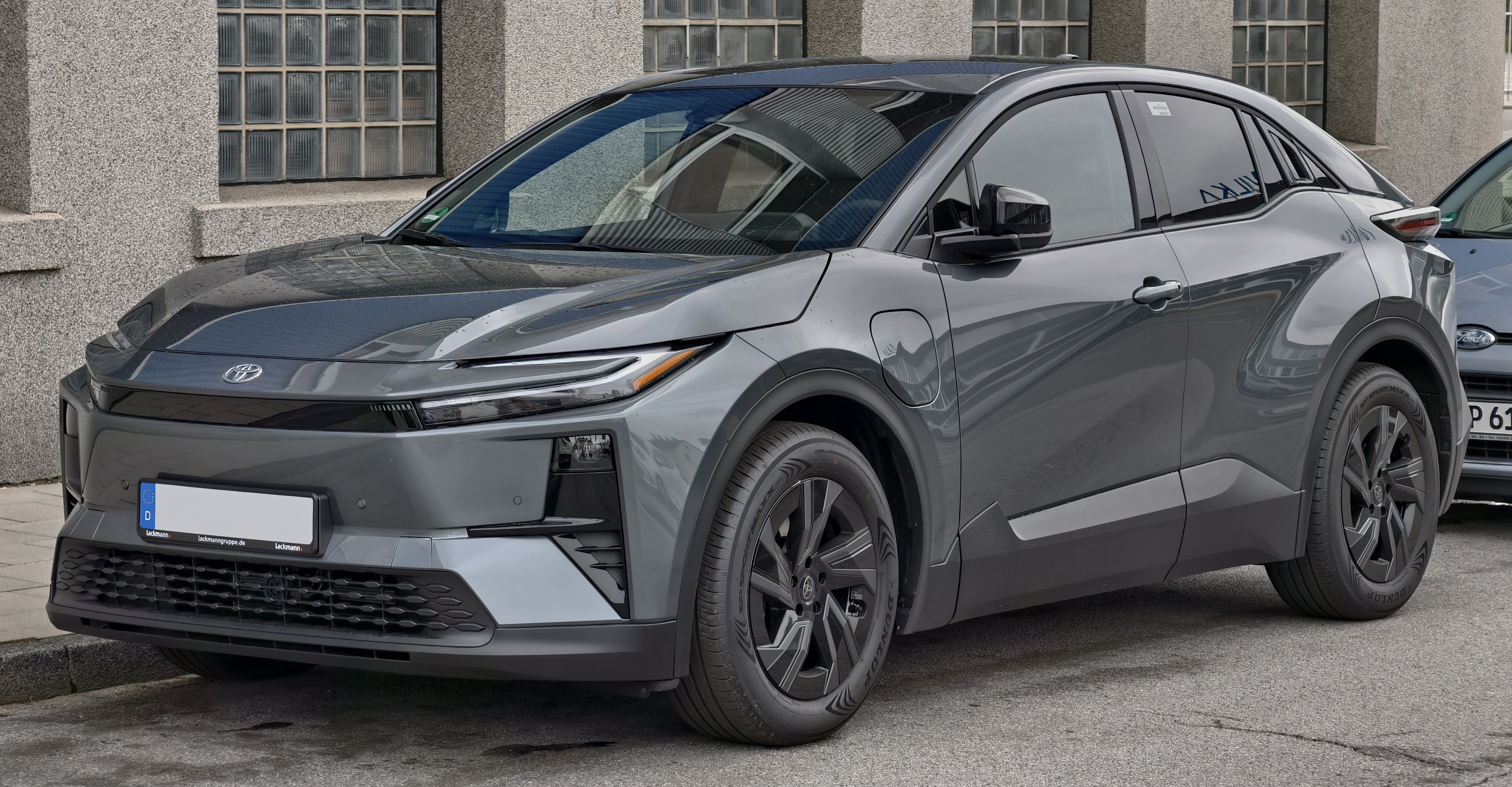

Overview
- Manufacturer: Toyota
- Also called: Toyota C-HR (North America); Subaru Uncharted
- Production: September 2025 – present
- Model years: 2026–present
- Assembly: Japan: Toyota City, Aichi (Takaoka plant)

Body and chassis
- Class: Compact crossover SUV (C)
- Body style: 5-door coupe SUV
- Layout: Front-motor, front-wheel-drive; Dual-motor, all-wheel-drive
- Platform: e-TNGA
- Related: Toyota bZ4X/bZ / Subaru Solterra; Toyota bZ4X Touring / bZ Woodland / Subaru Trailseeker/E-Outback; Lexus RZ

Powertrain
- Electric motor: AC permanent magnet synchronous
- Power output: 123–165 kW (165–221 hp; 167–224 PS) (FWD); 252 kW (338 hp; 343 PS) (4WD)
- Transmission: eAxle
- Battery: 57.7–77.0 kWh PPES (Panasonic/Toyota)
- Range: 455–600 km (283–373 mi) (FWD, claimed); 525 km (326 mi) (4WD, claimed)
- Plug-in charging: 11–22 kW (AC); 150 kW (DC)

Dimensions
- Wheelbase: 2,750 mm (108.3 in)
- Length: 4,520 mm (178.0 in)
- Width: 1,870 mm (73.6 in)
- Height: 1,595 mm (62.8 in)
- Curb weight: 1,810–1,985 kg (3,990–4,376 lb)

The Toyota C-HR+ is a battery electric compact crossover SUV (C-segment) manufactured by Toyota. The vehicle was unveiled in March 2025. It was released in Europe in October 2025. In North America, the vehicle is marketed simply as the Toyota C-HR. A Subaru version is marketed as the Subaru Uncharted.

Named after the smaller hybrid electric Toyota C-HR, the C-HR+ is a larger vehicle built on a separate e-TNGA platform shared with the bZ4X.

== Overview ==
The design of the C-HR+ was previewed by the bZ Compact SUV concept car presented in 2022 in Europe and the US. With the production version, the model drops the bZ moniker in favour of an existing nameplate, the C-HR, as Toyota abandoned its bZ naming strategy for battery electric vehicles globally (except China).

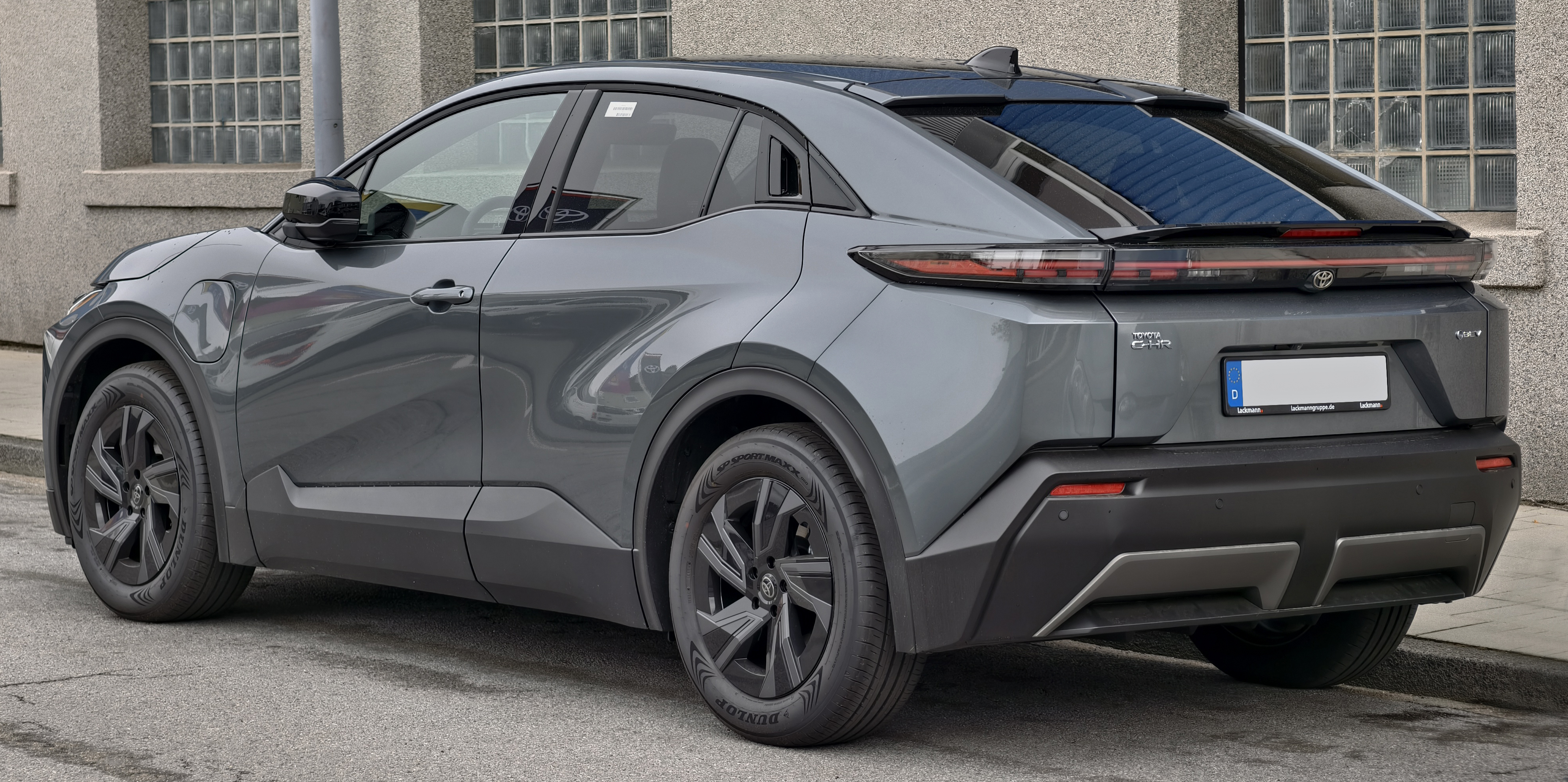
Toyota C-HR+ rear (Europe)

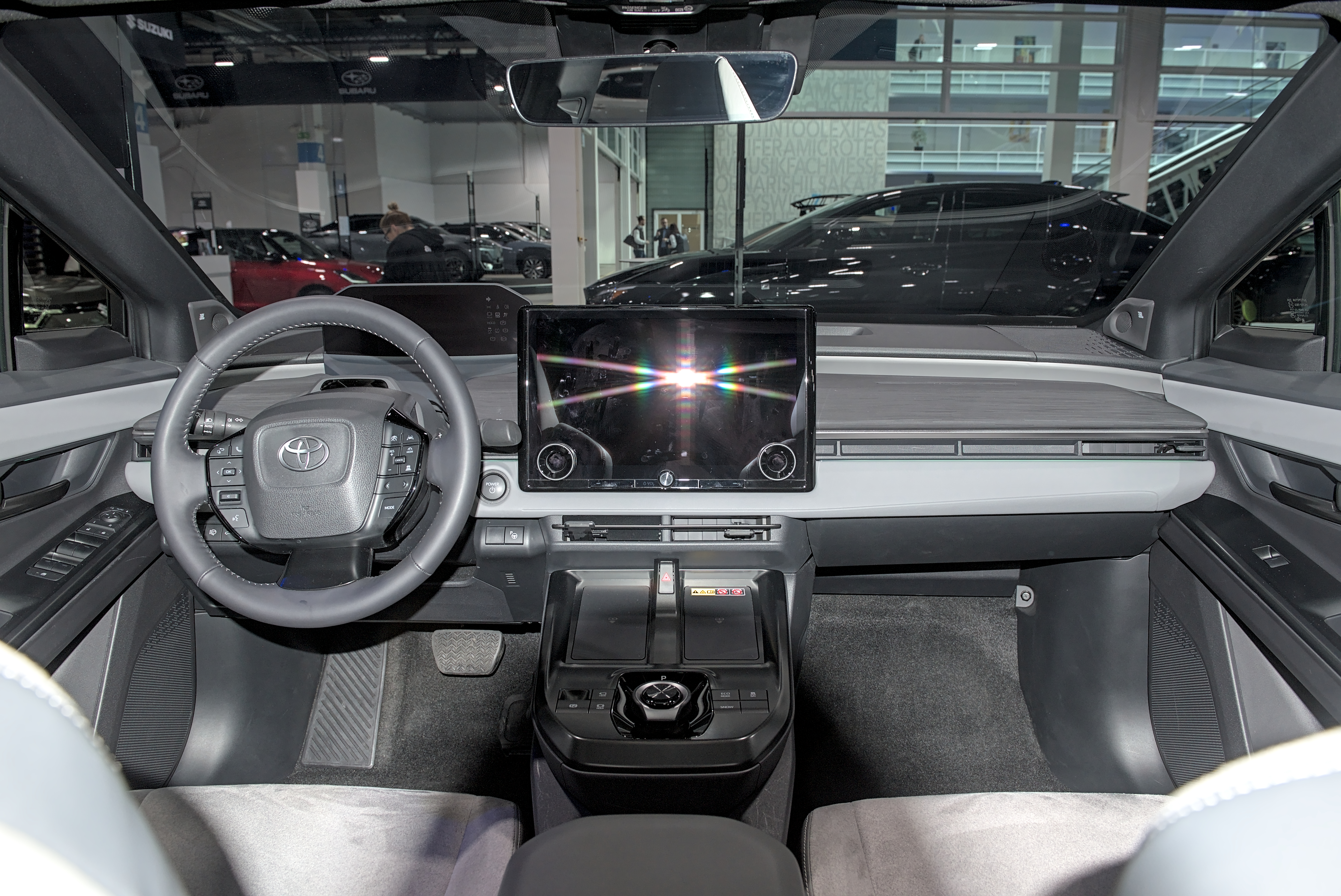
Toyota C-HR+ interior

The C-HR+ will be offered with both front-wheel drive and all-wheel drive configurations. The single-motor version, paired with a 57.7 kWh battery, produces 123 kW (165 hp; 167 PS). When equipped with the larger 77 kWh battery, output increases to 165 kW (221 hp; 224 PS). Depending on the variant and trim level, the estimated maximum driving range is up to 600 km (373 mi) based on the WLTP cycle.

The dual-motor version uses the larger 77 kWh battery and delivers a combined output of 252 kW (338 hp; 343 PS). It is one of Toyota’s most powerful vehicles, excluding the Toyota GR Supra. It accelerates from 0–100 km/h (0–62 mph) in approximately 5.2 seconds. All-wheel drive models use two permanent-magnet motors without axle disconnect.

=== Subaru Uncharted ===
A rebadged version of the C-HR+ is marketed by Subaru as the Uncharted, with a fastback silhouette, sloping rear roofling and 18- or 20-inch wheels.

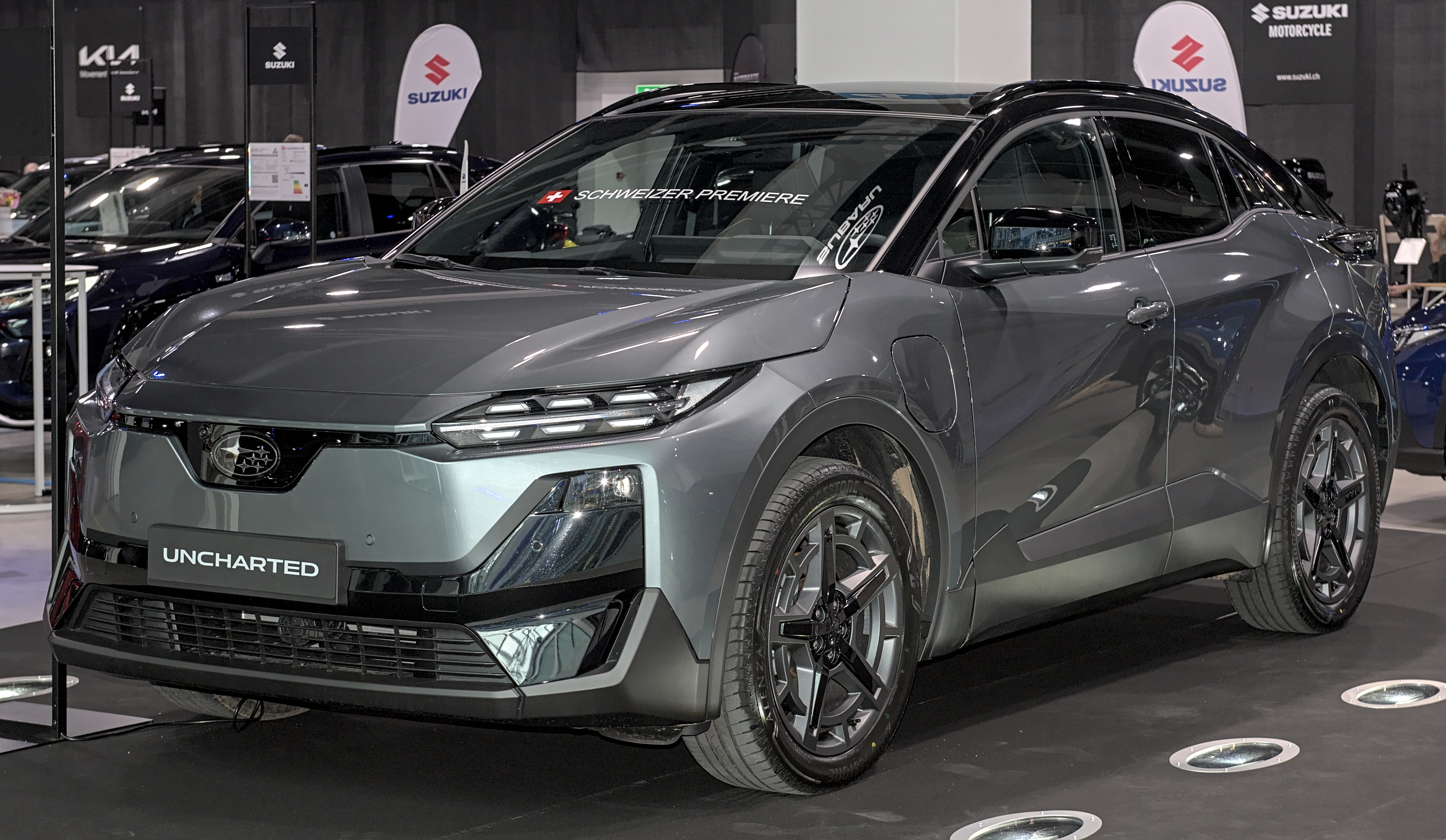
Subaru Uncharted front

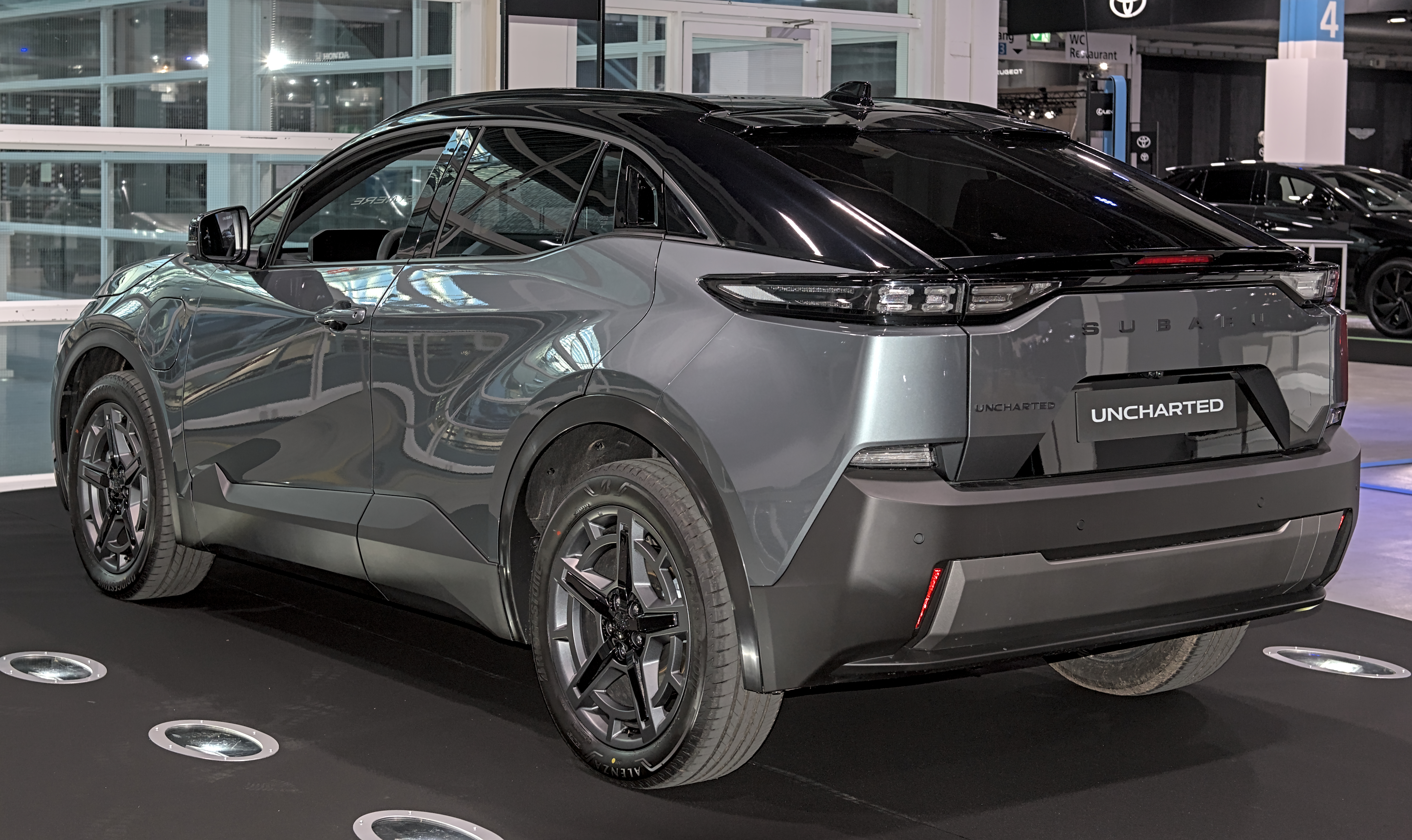
Subaru Uncharted rear

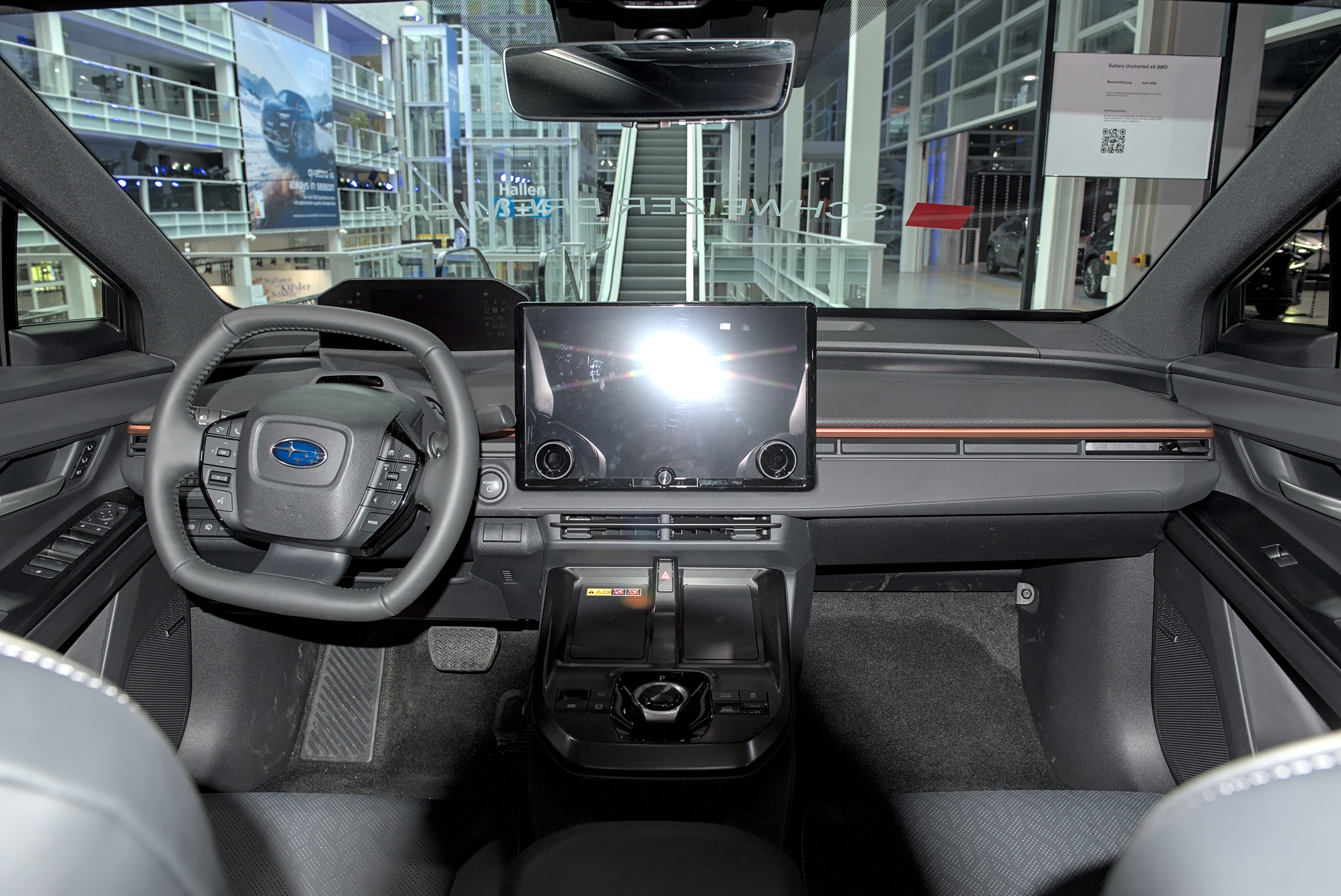
Subaru Uncharted interior

== Safety ==
=== ANCAP ===
ANCAP test results Subaru Uncharted (2025, aligned with Euro NCAP)
Test	Points	%
Overall:	5 /5 stars	
Adult occupant:	35.48	88%
Child occupant:	42.36	86%
Pedestrian:	50.47	80%
Safety assist:	14.86	82%

=== Euro NCAP ===
Euro NCAP test results Toyota C-HR+ Long Range, LHD (2025)
Test	Points	%
Overall:	5 /5 stars	
Adult occupant:	35.6	88%
Child occupant:	41.9	85%
Pedestrian:	50.5	80%
Safety assist:	14.4	79%

== Markets ==
=== Europe ===
The C-HR+ is scheduled to launch in select European markets by the end of 2025, with broader availability across Europe planned for 2026.

=== North America ===
The North American market model is marketed simply as the C-HR or C-HR BEV. It debuted on 14 May 2025. The C-HR models for the US market are equipped exclusively with the larger 74.7 kWh (usable) battery pack and a dual-motor all-wheel drive system, producing 252 kW (338 hp; 343 PS). Under EPA standards, the model has an estimated range of 290 mi (467 km).

The North American market Subaru Uncharted, unlike the C-HR, is offered with a front-wheel drive configuration on the base trims (Premium FWD in the US, FWD and FWD LR in Canada). All US models are equipped exclusively with the larger 77 kWh battery pack, however, the smaller 57.7 kWh battery pack is available in Canada.

=== Oceania ===
The Subaru Uncharted went on sale in Australia on 14 May 2026, in the sole AWD variant using the 77.4 kWh battery pack.

== See also ==
- List of Toyota vehicles
- List of Subaru vehicles
