= Subaru Elten =

Concept city car

Overview
- Manufacturer: Subaru

Body and chassis
- Class: City car
- Body style: 4-door hatchback
- Layout: Front-engine, front-wheel drive

Powertrain
- Engine: 658 cc I4
- Electric motor: 30 kW
- Transmission: eCVT
- Hybrid drivetrain: Parallel hybrid
- Battery: Lithium manganese

Dimensions
- Wheelbase: 2,260 mm (89.0 in)
- Length: 3,410 mm (134.3 in)
- Width: 1,500 mm (59.1 in)
- Height: 1,500 mm (59.1 in)
- Curb weight: 960 kg (2,116 lb)

The Subaru Elten was a concept hybrid 4WD hatchback designed by Subaru. It was introduced at the 1997 Tokyo Motor Show. The name Elten was a contraction of 'electric' and 'K10' (development code for the Subaru 360).

The Elten with one driver-side door and two passenger-side doors was a successor to the 360 in taking many design elements from that vehicle, including a similar grille and headlights. It was 3,410 mm (11 ft 2 in) long, 1,500 mm (4 ft 11 in) wide, 1,500 mm (4 ft 11 in) tall and had a 2,260 mm (7 ft 5 in) wheelbase. Its weight was 960 kg (2,120 lb). The design was later scrapped for a different model.

In the front, the Subaru concept had a 4-cylinder, 658 cc gasoline engine producing 46 hp (34 kW) at 6,000 rpm and 5.8 kg⋅m (57 N⋅m; 42 lb⋅ft) at 3,600 rpm, and an electric motor with 30 kW and 3.9 kg⋅m (38 N⋅m; 28 lb⋅ft) at 7,500 rpm, combined through an eCVT transmission. The batteries (a manganese-lithium battery and a condenser battery) were under the floor and were charged by the combustion engine, by regenerative braking and through solar panels on the roof. The roof panels could charge enough energy in 3 hours to drive 67 km (42 mi).
