= Subaru Fleet-X =

Overview
- Production: 1999 (concept)

Body and chassis
- Class: Concept car
- Body style: 4-door station wagon
- Layout: F4

Powertrain
- Engine: 2.0 L EJ204
- Transmission: 4 speed automatic

Dimensions
- Wheelbase: 2,670 mm (105.1 in)
- Length: 4,597 mm (181.0 in)
- Width: 1,760 mm (69.3 in)
- Height: 1,430 mm (56.3 in)
- Curb weight: 1,050 kg (2,315 lb)

The Subaru Fleet-X was a concept station wagon made by Fuji Heavy Industries, introduced at the 1999 Tokyo Motor Show.

== Concepts ==
The Fleet-X was designed to be as light as possible, substituting polycarbonate for the rear quarter and tailgate windows. The concept used different colors to identify where lightweight alternate materials were used, including the exterior door skin, hood, and roof panels.
