= Electric car use by country =

Global top-selling light-duty plug-in electric vehicle regional or country markets as of December 2021

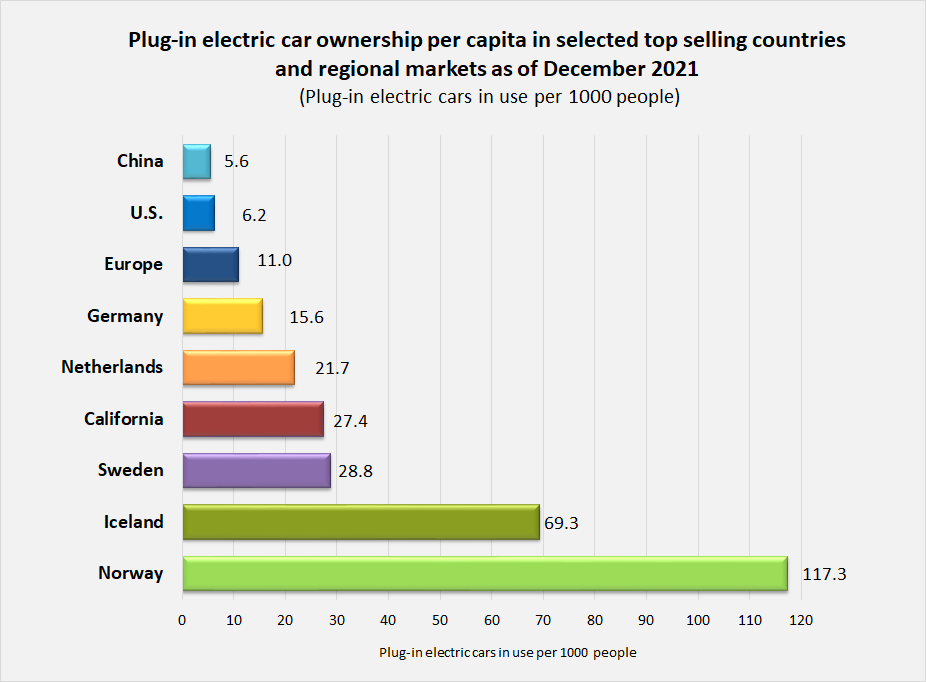
Comparison of plug-in electric car ownership per capita in selected top selling countries and regional markets as plug-in cars per 1,000 people, as of December 2021

Electric car use by country varies worldwide, as the adoption of plug-in electric vehicles is affected by consumer demand, market prices, availability of charging infrastructure, and government policies, such as purchase incentives and long term regulatory signals (ZEV mandates, CO_{2} emissions regulations, fuel economy standards, and phase-out of fossil fuel vehicles).

Plug-in electric vehicles (PEVs) are generally divided into all-electric or battery electric vehicles (BEVs), which run only on batteries, and plug-in hybrids (PHEVs), which combine battery power with internal combustion engines. The popularity of electric vehicles has been expanding rapidly due to government subsidies, improving charging infrastructure, their increasing range, lower battery costs, and environmental sensitivity.However, by 2025, electric cars represented about 5% of the global car stock. Electric car sales exceeded 20 million in 2025, up 20% from 2024, and accounted for 25% of global car sales."Trends in electric cars – Global EV Outlook 2026". International Energy Agency. 20 May 2026.

Global cumulative sales of highway-legal light-duty plug-in electric vehicles reached 1 million units in September 2015, 5 million in December 2018, and passed the 10 million milestone in 2020. By mid-2022, there were over 20 million light-duty plug-in vehicles on the world's roads. Sales of plug-in passenger cars achieved a 9% global market share of new car sales in 2021, up from 4.6% in 2020, and 2.5% in 2019. The PEV market has been shifting towards fully electric battery vehicles. The global ratio between BEVs and PHEVs went from 56:44 in 2012, to 60:40 in 2015, and rose to 74:26 in 2019. The ratio was 71:29 in 2021.

As of December 2023, China had the largest stock of highway legal plug-in passenger cars with 20.4 million units, almost half of the global fleet in use. China also dominates the plug-in light commercial vehicle and electric bus deployment, with its stock reaching over 500,000 buses in 2019, 98% of the global stock, and 247,500 electric light commercial vehicles, 65% of the global fleet.

Europe had about 11.8 million plug-in passenger cars at the end of 2023, accounting for around 30% of the global stock. Europe also has the world's second-largest stock of electric light commercial vehicles, with about 290,000 vans. As of June 2025, cumulative sales in the United States totaled 7.04 million plug-in cars since 2010, with California listed as the largest U.S. plug-in regional market with 1.77 million plug-in cars sold by 2023.

As of December 2021, Germany is the leading European country with 1.38 million plug-in cars registered since 2010. Norway has the highest market penetration per capita in the world, and also has the world's largest plug-in segment market share of new car sales, 86.2% in 2021. Over 10% of all passenger cars on Norwegian roads were plug-ins in October 2018, and rose to 22% in 2021. The Netherlands had the highest density of EV charging stations in the world by 2019.

== History ==
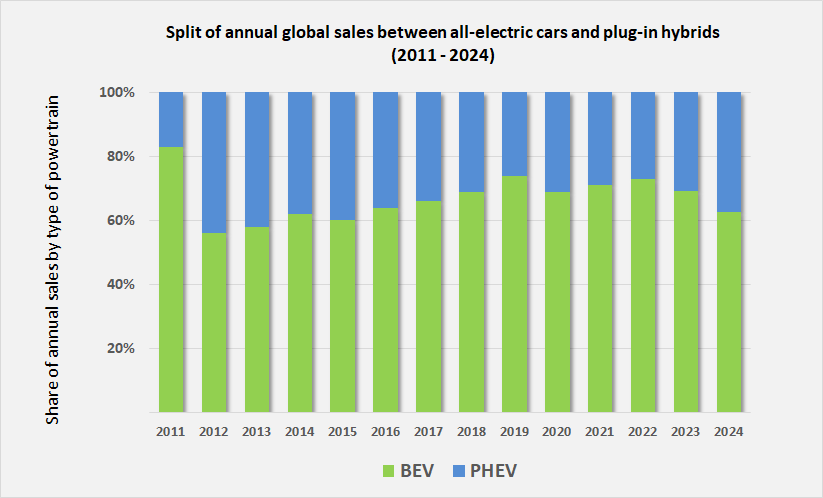
Evolution of the ratio between global sales of BEVs and PHEVs from 2011 to 2024

The global stock of plug-in electric vehicles (PEVs) between 2005 and 2009 consisted exclusively of all-electric cars (BEV), totaling about 1,700 units in 2005, and almost 6,000 in 2009. The plug-in stock rose to about 12,500 units in 2010, of which 350 were plug-in hybrids (PHEVs). By comparison, during the Golden Age of the electric car at the beginning of the 20th century, the EV stock peaked at approximately 30,000 vehicles. After the introduction of the Think City, Nissan Leaf and the Chevrolet Volt in late December 2010, the first mass-production plug-in electric cars by major manufacturers, plug-in sales grew to about 50,000 units in 2011, to 125,000 in 2012, and almost 213,000 cars and utility vans in 2013. Sales totaled over 315,000 units in 2014, up 48% from 2013. In March 2014, Norway became the first country where over 1 in every 100 passenger cars on the roads was a plug-in, and, by October 2018, 1 in every 10 passenger cars registered in Norway was a plug-in.

In five years, global sales of highway legal light-duty plug-in vehicles increased more than ten-fold, totaling more than 565,000 units in 2015—an 80% increase from 2014, driven mainly by China and Europe. About 775,000 plug-in electric cars and vans were sold in 2016, and 1.22 million in 2017—up 57% from 2016—with China accounting for about half of global sales. The global market share of the new light-duty plug-in segment reached 1.3% in 2017, up from 0.86% in 2016, and 0.38% in 2014. Global light-duty plug-in vehicle sales passed the 3 million milestone in November 2017 and 5 million at the end 2018. Global sales totaled 2,018,247 plug-in passenger cars in 2018, up 72% from 2017, with a market share of 2.1%. The BEV:PHEV ratio rose to 69:31 in 2018 and to 74:26 in 2019. By the end of 2019 the stock of light-duty plug-in vehicles totaled about 7.5 million units. Worldwide sales in 2019 rose to 2,209,831 units with a global market share of 2.5%. The combined number of PEV and hybrid cars sold in the European Union hit a record in July 2020, accounting for 18% of the total number of passenger cars sold. It also was the first time that more than 200,000 electric cars were sold in a single month.

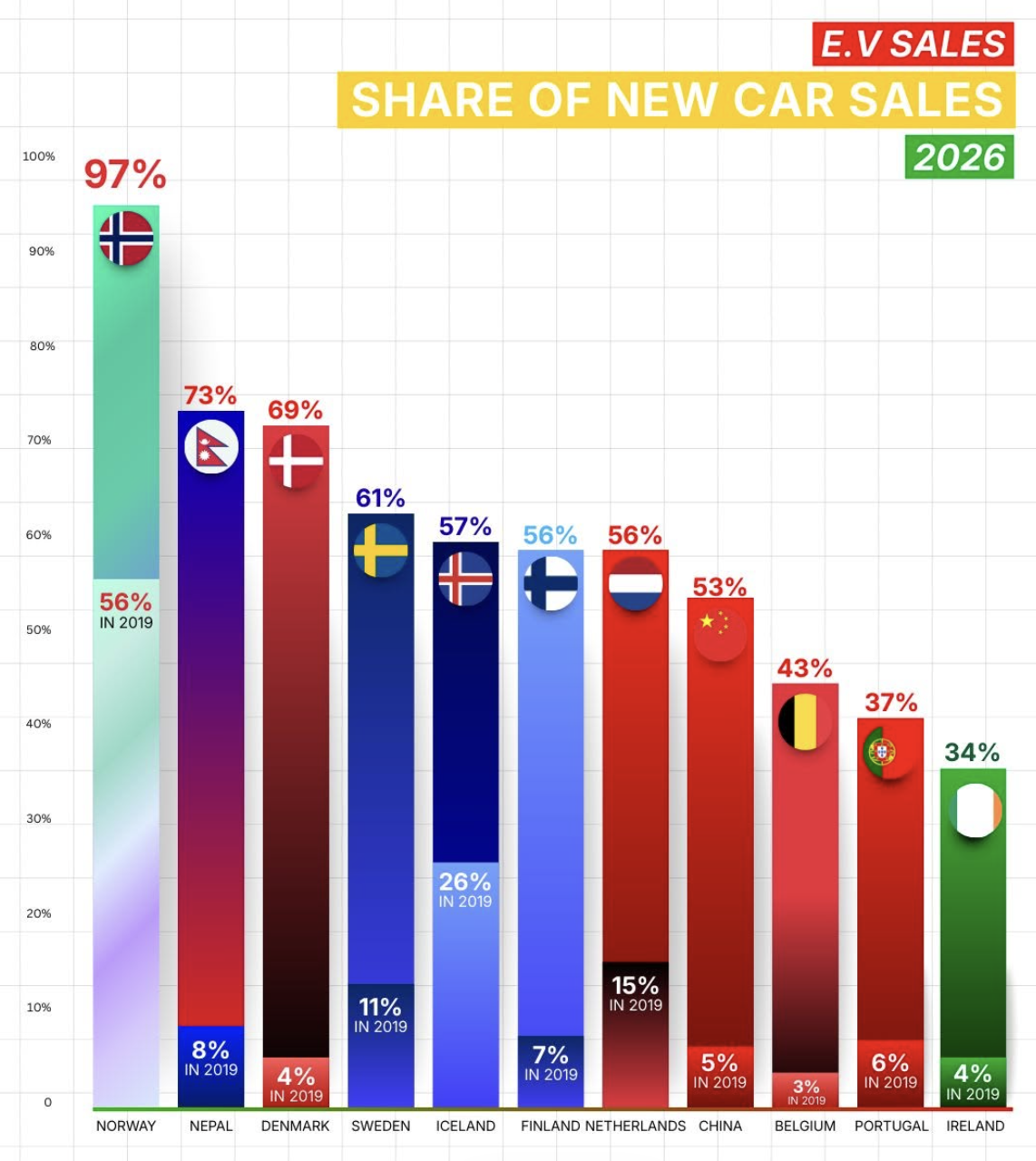
Countries with the world's highest electric vehicle market share by new car percentage in 2025

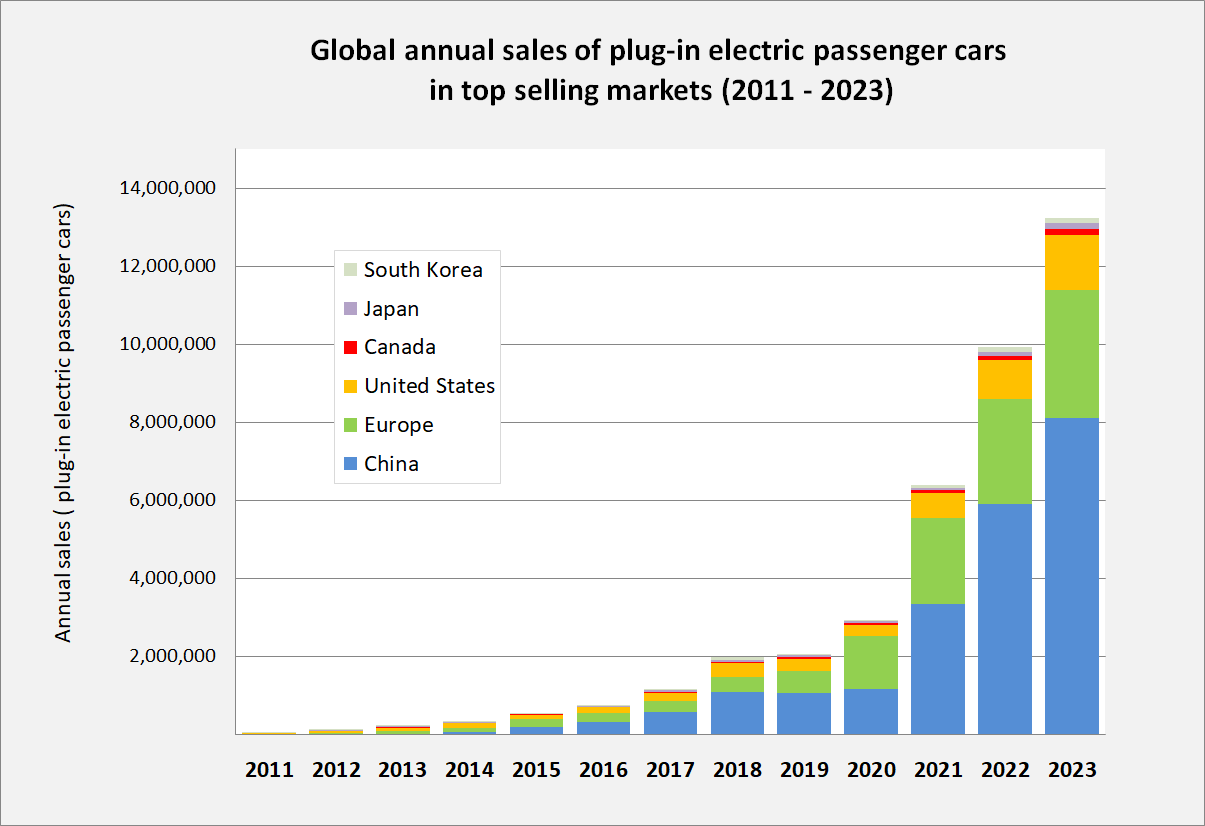
Annual sales of plug-in passenger cars in the world's top country and regional markets between 2011 and 2023

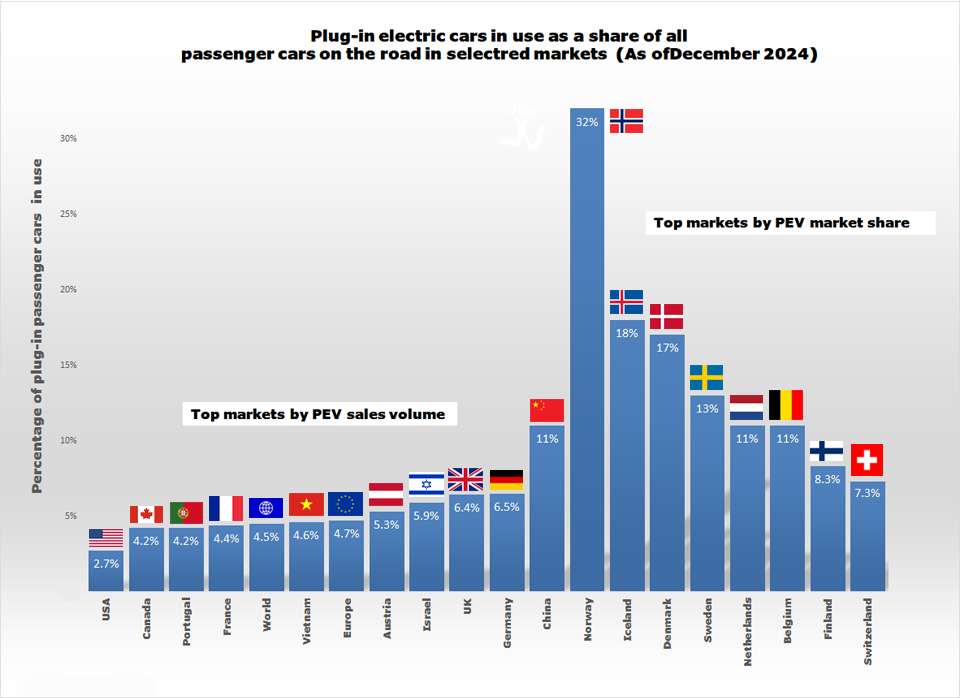
Plug-in electric cars in use as a proportion of all passenger cars on the road in selected countries and regional markets at the end of 2024

Date	Milestone
1996	Launch of the limited production General Motors EV1
1997	Launch of the Toyota RAV4 EV
December 2008	100th Tesla Roadster delivered
December 2010	Nissan Leaf and Chevrolet Volt deliveries began
December 2012	Annual global sales passed the 100,000 mark
March 2014	Norway achieves 1% of cars on the road as plug-ins
October 2014	EU adopt the Alternative Fuels Infrastructure Directive in 2014.
December 2014	100,000th plug-in sold in Japan
September 2015	Cumulative global plug-in sales passed 1 million units.
March 2016	500,000th new energy vehicle sold in China (includes heavy-duty commercial vehicles)
March 2016	100,000th plug-in sold in Norway
May 2016	500,000th plug-in sold in Europe
August 2016	500,000th plug-in sold in the U.S
September 2016	500,000th new energy passenger car sold in China
September 2016	Global all-electric car/van sales passed 1 million.
October 2016	100,000th plug-in sold in France
November 2016	100,000th plug-in sold in the Netherlands
December 2016	Cumulative global plug-in sales passed 2 million units
December 2016	5% of passenger cars on Norwegian roads are plug-ins
November 2017	Cumulative global plug-in sales passed 3 million units
December 2017	Annual global sales passed the 1 million unit mark
December 2017	Annual global market share passed 1% for the first time
First half 2018	1 million plug-in electric cars sold in Europe
September 2018	1 million plug-in electric cars sold in the US
September 2018	2 million new energy passenger cars sold in China (includes heavy-duty commercial vehicles)
October 2018	10% of passenger cars on Norwegian roads are plug-ins
November 2018	500,000th plug-in car sold in California
December 2018	Annual global sales passed the 2 million unit mark
December 2018	Annual sales of EVs passed 1 million in China
December 2018	Cumulative global plug-in sales passed 5 million units
December 2018	Tesla Model 3 becomes first EV to exceed 100,000 sales mark in a single year
June 2019	China's Electric Vehicle Charging Posts surpasses 1 million
December 2020	Cumulative global plug-in sales passed 10 million units
December 2020	Annual sales of EVs passed 1 million in Europe
December 2020	Over 15% of cars on Norwegian roads are plug-ins
June 2021	Tesla Model 3 is the first electric car to pass 1 million units in global sales
July 2021	1 million plug-in cars sold in Germany
November 2021	1 million plug-in cars sold in California
May 2022	Cumulative global plug-in sales passed 20 million units
June 2022	10 million plug-in cars on the road in China
September 2022	1 million plug-in cars on the road in UK
January 2023	EVs surpass 10% in global market share
May 2023	Tesla Model Y becomes the world's best selling vehicle
October 2025	EVs surpass 25% in global market share

== Statistics ==
=== Market share ===
Passenger plug-in market share of total new car sales for selected countries and selected regional markets since 2013 (Note: Includes only countries with a minimum market share of 1.0% in 2022)
Country	2025	2024	2023	2022	2021	2020	2019	2018	2017	2016	2015	2014	2013
Norway	97.4%	91.6%	90.4%	87.6%	86.2%	74.7%	55.9%	49.1%	39.2%	29.1%	22.4%	13.8%	6.1%
Nepal	73.0%	65.0%	56.0%	34.0%	15.0%	9.5%	8.0%	3.2%	—	—	—	—	—
Denmark	71.1%	51.5%	46.1%	38.6%	35.2%	16.4%	4.2%	2.0%	0.6%	0.6%	2.29%	0.88%	0.29%
Sweden	63.2%	58.4%	59.8%	56.1%	43.3%	32.2%	11.4%	8.2%	5.2%	3.5%	2.62%	1.53%	0.71%
Iceland	61.4%	31.0%	64.0%	56.1%	54.7%	45.0%	22.6%	17.2%	11.7%	5.6%	3.6%	2.1%	1.3%
Ethiopia	60.0%	—	—	—	—	—	—	—	—	—	—	—	—
Finland	56.8%	49.6%	54.4%	37.5%	30.8%	18.1%	6.9%	4.7%	2.57%	1.2%	—	—	—
Netherlands	56.5%	48.4%	44%	34.9%	29.8%	24.6%	14.9%	6.2%	2.2%	6.7%	9.9%	3.87%	5.55%
China	54.0%	47.2%	37.0%	30.0%	15.0%	5.4%	4.9%	4.2%	2.1%	1.31%	0.84%	0.23%	0.08%
Albania	46.4%	—	—	—	—	—	—	—	—	—	—	—	—
Singapore	45.0%	33.0%	18.0%	11.7%	1.0%	1.0%	1.0%	1.0%	1.0%	—	—	—	—
Belgium	43.8%	52.3%	40.7%	26.5%	18.4%	10.7%	3.2%	2.5%	2.7%	1.8%	—	—	—
Portugal	38.4%	33.4%	31.8%	21.7%	20.0%	13.5%	5.7%	3.6%	1.9%	—	—	—	—
Vietnam	36.8%	28.0%	5.6%	1.0%	0.3%	0.1%	—	—	—	—	—	—	—
United Kingdom	34.6%	28.2%	23.9%	22.9%	18.6%	10.7%	2.9%	2.53%	1.86%	1.37%	1.07%	0.59%	0.16%
Switzerland	34.0%	28.0%	30.1%	25.9%	22.5%	14.3%	5.5%	3.2%	2.55%	1.8%	1.98%	0.75%	0.44%
Ireland	34.0%	24.75%	27.1%	22.2%	15.7%	7.4%	4.1%	1.57%	0.72%	0.48%	0.46%	0.27%	—
Romania	31.8%	25.1%	24.4%	21.7%	15.5%	7.12%	4.18%	2.89%	2.11%	1.03%	0.50%	0.28%	0.34%
Austria	31.4%	17.6%	27.0%	22.0%	20.0%	9.5%	3.5%	2.6%	2.06%	1.6%	0.90%	—	—
Germany	30.0%	20.3%	24.6%	31.4%	26.0%	13.5%	3.0%	1.9%	1.58%	1.1%	0.73%	0.43%	0.25%
France (Note: For 2015 and before, the French market share corresponds to combined sales of BEV passenger cars and utility vans only (PHEVs not included).)	26.7%	25.4%	26.0%	21.6%	18.3%	11.2%	2.8%	2.11%	1.98%	1.4%	1.19%	0.70%	0.83%
Global average	25.0%	22.0%	16.0%	14.0%	8.6%	4.6%	2.5%	2.1%	1.3%	0.86%	0.7%	0.4%	0.3%
Thailand	23.7%	15.4%	15.4%	12.0%	—	—	—	—	—	—	—	—	—
Uruguay	20.2%	8.9%	3.1%	1.9%	1.1%	0.3%	0.4%	—	—	—	—	—	—
Spain	20.1%	12.4%	11.9%	9.6%	7.8%	4.8%	1.4%	0.9%	0.6%	0.32%	—	—	—
Israel	20.0%	24.5%	18.0%	10.0%	3.8%	0.6%	0.1%	—	—	—	—	—	—
Kazakhstan	—	20.0%	18.0%	14.0%	9.0%	—	—	—	—	—	—	—	—
Latvia	19.3%	9.5%	10%	8.0%	5.0%	2.5%	1.0%	0.5%	0.3%	0.2%	0.1%	—	—
Turkey	17.7%	10.1%	6.8%	1.2%	0.1%	—	—	—	—	—	—	—	—
Costa Rica	17.0%	15.0%	11.6%	7.3%	3.0%	3.0%	—	—	—	—	—	—	—
Indonesia	16.4%	—	—	—	—	—	—	—	—	—	—	—	—
Greece	14.3%	12.4%	5.4%	2.8%	—	—	—	—	—	—	—	—	—
Australia	12.6%	9.65%	8.1%	5.1%	2.4%	0.78%	0.6%	0.3%	0.19%	0.12%	0.15%	0.12%	0.026%
Italy	12.5%	7.5%	8.6%	8.8%	9.3%	4.3%	0.6%	0.26%	0.1%	0.08%	0.09%	0.08%	0.07%
Poland	12.0%	6.0%	4.0%	3.0%	—	—	—	—	—	—	—	—	—
Uzbekistan	12.0%	7.1%	—	—	—	—	—	—	—	—	—	—	—
New Zealand	—	11.2%	27.2%	19.7%	8.2%	2.8%	2.7%	1.4%	1.0%	0.6%	0.2%	0.1%	—
South Korea	11.0%	6.1%	9.3%	—	—	—	—	—	—	—	—	—	
United States	9.1%	9.9%	9.4%	6.8%	4.0%	2.2%	1.9%	2.1%	1.1%	0.90%	0.66%	0.72%	0.60%
Colombia	9.0%	4.6%	3.0%	2.0%	—	—	—	—	—	—	—	—	—
Canada	8.7%	14.6%	10.8%	8.2%	6.6%	3.5%	3.0%	2.2%	0.92%	0.58%	0.35%	0.28%	0.18%
Brazil	7.1%	3.4%	2.4%	1.0%	—	—	—	—	—	—	—	—	—
Mexico	7.1%	4.3%	—	—	—	—	—	—	—	—	—	—	—
Malaysia	6.8%	—	—	—	—	—	—	—	—	—	—	—	—
Bulgaria	6.0%	4.6%	5.9%	3.4%	1.2%	0.6%	—	—	—	—	—	—	—
Morocco	5.0%	—	—	—	—	—	—	—	—	—	—	—	—
Paraguay	4.8%	—	—	—	—	—	—	—	—	—	—	—	—
Philippines	4.2%	—	—	—	—	—	—	—	—	—	—	—	—
India	4.1%	—	—	—	—	—	—	—	—	—	—	—	—
Ecuador	3.4%	—	—	—	—	—	—	—	—	—	—	—	—
Chile	3.0%	2.3%	5.0%	4.5%	3.0%	2.4%	1.3%	1.2%	—	—	—	—	—
Japan	—	1.8%	3.6%	3.0%	1.0%	0.6%	0.9%	1.0%	1.1%	0.59%	0.68%	1.06%	0.91%
California	—	—	24.8%	19.1%	12.2%	7.6%	7.8%	7.6%	4.9%	3.6%	3.1%	3.2%	2.5%
Europe (Note: European figures correspond to European Union member countries plus the UK and three EFTA countries (Iceland, Norway and Switzerland) as per ACEA)	29.1%	22.8%	23.4%	22.9%	19.0%	11.4%	3.6%	2.5%	1.74%	1.3%	1.41%	0.66%	0.49%
Hong Kong	—	90.8%	64.1%	60.0%	23.0%	14.0%	5.0%	—	—	5.0%	4.84%	—	0.39%

=== Sales, market, and usage share ===
Light-duty plug-in electric vehicle stock, market penetration, annual sales, and market share in the top selling countries and regional markets for latest available year
Country or region	PEV stock/ cumulative sales (2023) (Note: Includes sales or registrations of highway legal light-duty vehicles except where noted)	Annual sales (2023)	Market share (2023)	% of cars in use (2023) (Note: Market penetration is the number of plug-in passenger cars as a percentage of the stock or total number of passenger cars registered. Data for latest available year.)
China (Note: Only includes plug-in electric passenger cars.)	21,800,000	8,095,078	37.0%	7.6%
Europe (Note: European figures correspond to European Union member countries plus the UK and three EFTA countries (Iceland, Norway and Switzerland) as per ACEA.)	11,200,000	3,016,880	24.0%	3.8%
United States	4,800,000	1,390,000	9.5%	2.1%
Germany	2,500,000	699,943	24.6%	5.4%
California	1,775,915	440,616	24.8%	3.85% (2021)
United Kingdom	1,580,000	450,000	24.0%	5.0%
France	1,570,000	470,000	25.0%	4.1%
Norway (Note: Includes registrations of used imports)	900,000	110,000	93.0%	29.0%
Netherlands (Note: Registered light-duty plug-in stock at the end of 2020 (in use))	700,000	210,000	35.0%	8.3%
Sweden	560,000	171,000	60.0%	11.0%
South Korea	553,000	136,300	7.9%	2.4%
Canada	550,000	171,000	13.0%	2.3%
Japan (Note: Kei cars are not included for the Japanese market share estimate.)	540,000	140,000	3.6%	0.8%
Global total	40,000,000	13,800,000	18.0%	3.2%

== Albania ==
Albania is considered one of the best countries for electric-car emissions, as it generates all of its electricity from hydroelectric power. Electric cars are currently used by the Albanian Police Force. The Interior Minister claimed, that the cost of fuel per 100 km (62 mi) would be less than 120 Albanian leke (less than 1 euro). Saytaxi is the first taxi company in Albania that offers electric vehicles and operates a fast EV (electric vehicles) charging point, and has been operating in the country since 2014. Its goal is to replace 80% of all non-electric taxis with electric ones.

On 31 October 2017, Tirana became one of the few European capital cities to use electric buses when they tested a Solaris Urbino 12, to reduce pollution. Tirana's goal is to gradually convert 10 to 20 percent of the bus fleet into electric ones.

== Australia ==
The total stock of electric vehicles in Australia is approximately 21,000 as of 2020. In May 2021, electric vehicles accounted for 2% of new car sales in Australia, with approximately 5,000 Tesla vehicles sold in the first half of 2021. However, it has been predicted that approximately 66% of Australians will be driving electric cars by 2030. Moreover, 56% of Australians would consider an electric car when they next bought a vehicle. In early 2020, electric vehicle registrations nearly doubled the registrations of the previous year, showing the rapidly increasing popularity of electric vehicles in Australia. The Tesla Model 3 is Australia's most popular electric vehicle, accounting for 70% of EV sales in 2019.

The Labor-led opposition government in Australia in 2019 proposed a 50% electric vehicle target by 2030. Government analysis in 2019 also forecasted 50% of all new cars sold in Australia by 2035 will be electric on the current path.

The state of Victoria is Australia's most important electric vehicle market, with the highest number of electric vehicle purchases between 2011 and 2017, totaling 1,324 car sales. Victoria also manufactures electric vehicles with a commercial electric vehicle manufacturing facility to be established in 2021, producing 2,400 vehicles per year.

In March 2021, the Hyundai Nexo became the first fuel cell electric vehicle (FCEV) to be released in Australia. Coinciding with the release of the Nexo, the first publicly available hydrogen refuelling station in Australia opened the same day in Canberra.

=== Government incentives ===
Despite no federal EV sales target, Victoria aim for 50% of new car sales to be electric vehicles by 2030. The South Australian government also aim for 100% of new car sales to be electric vehicles by 2035. The NSW Government is also considering an official ban date for the sale of petrol and diesel vehicles.

Nationally, fuel-efficient vehicles attract less Luxury Car Tax, resulting in savings of up to $2,648. Victoria offers a subsidy of $3,000 – $5,000 for BEV cars under $68,740. ACT offers $15,000 interest free loan Victorian EV drivers pay a reduced rate of stamp duty and $100 off registration fees In ACT BEVs stamp duty exempt and 20% reduction in registration fees with the first 2 years of registration free EVs exempt from stamp duty until 2023 In Tasmania Car rental companies are exempt from registration fees on new and used EVs

The Federal Government pledged to spend $74.5 million on charging infrastructure in the 2021 budget. The Federal Government is also contributing $15 million to a national electric vehicle charging network built by Evie Networks and connecting Melbourne, Canberra, Sydney, Adelaide and Brisbane.

== Austria ==
Sales of new battery electric vehicles (BEV) rose from 1677 in 2015 to 6764 in 2018. In the first half of 2019, 4913 new BEVs were sold, representing 2.8% of the overall sales.

Total of new battery electric vehicles registered per year
Year	2015	2016	2017	2018	SEM 1 2019
Total new BEV registrations	1677	3826	5433	6764	4913
% of total new registrations	not available	not available	1.5%	2.0%	2.8%

== Belgium ==
Sales of electric cars rose from 97 units in 2009 to 116 in 2010, 425 in 2011, and 900 in 2012. Of the latter, only 350 units were sold to individuals. Then, sales of new battery electric vehicles (BEV) rose from 1358 in 2015 to 3647 in 2018. In the first half of 2019, 4601 new BEVs were sold, representing 1.5% of the overall sales.

Total of new battery electric vehicles registered per year
Year	2015	2016	2017	2018	SEM 1 2019
Total new BEV registrations	1358	2054	2713	3647	4601
% of total new registrations	not available	not available	0.5%	0.7%	1.5%

The Belgian government established purchase incentives for BEVs, ending in 2012. Hybrids were not eligible. A separate subsidy supported investments in public charging stations.

== Brazil ==
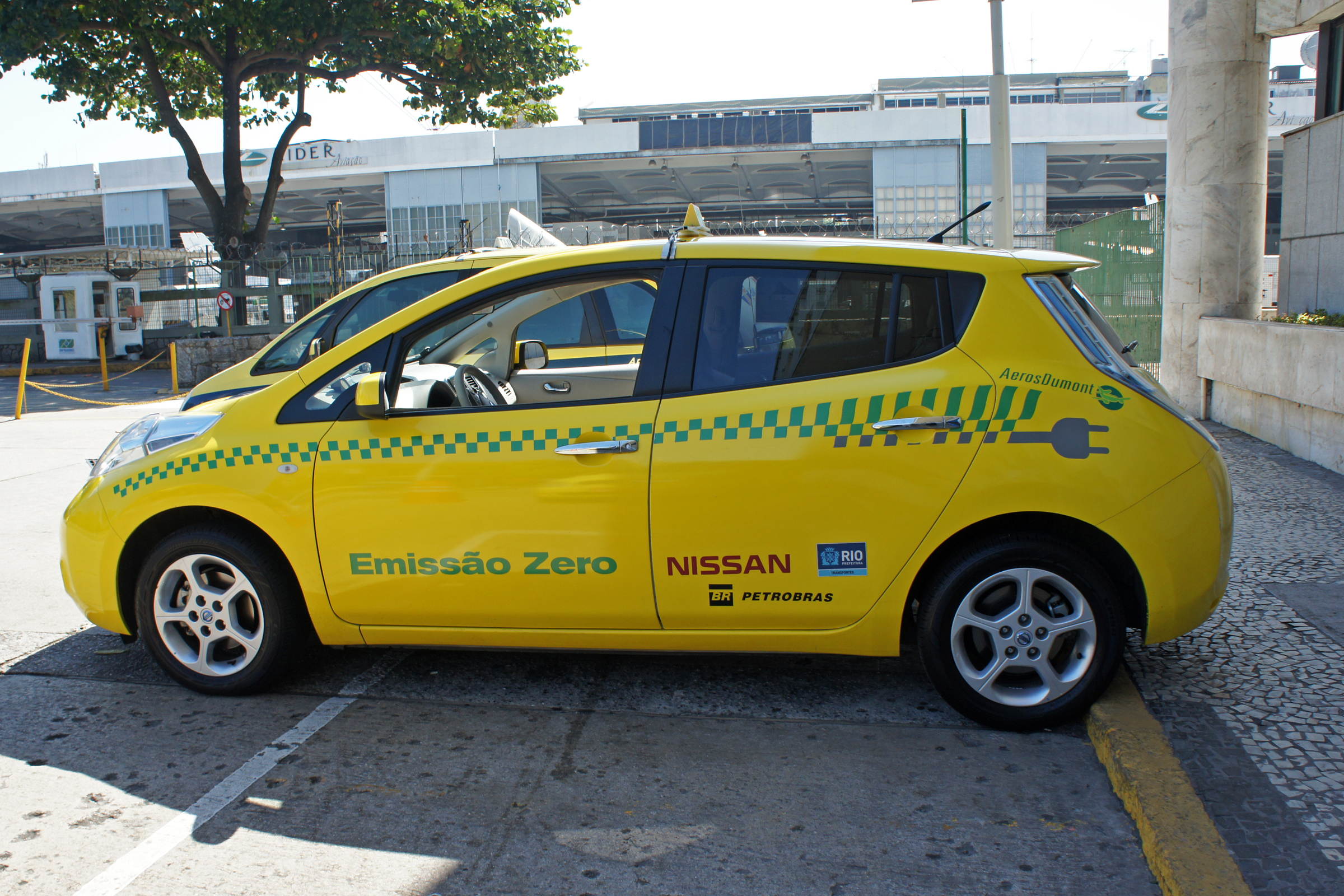
Nissan Leaf operating as a taxi at Santos Dumont airport as part of a demonstrations program in Rio de Janeiro

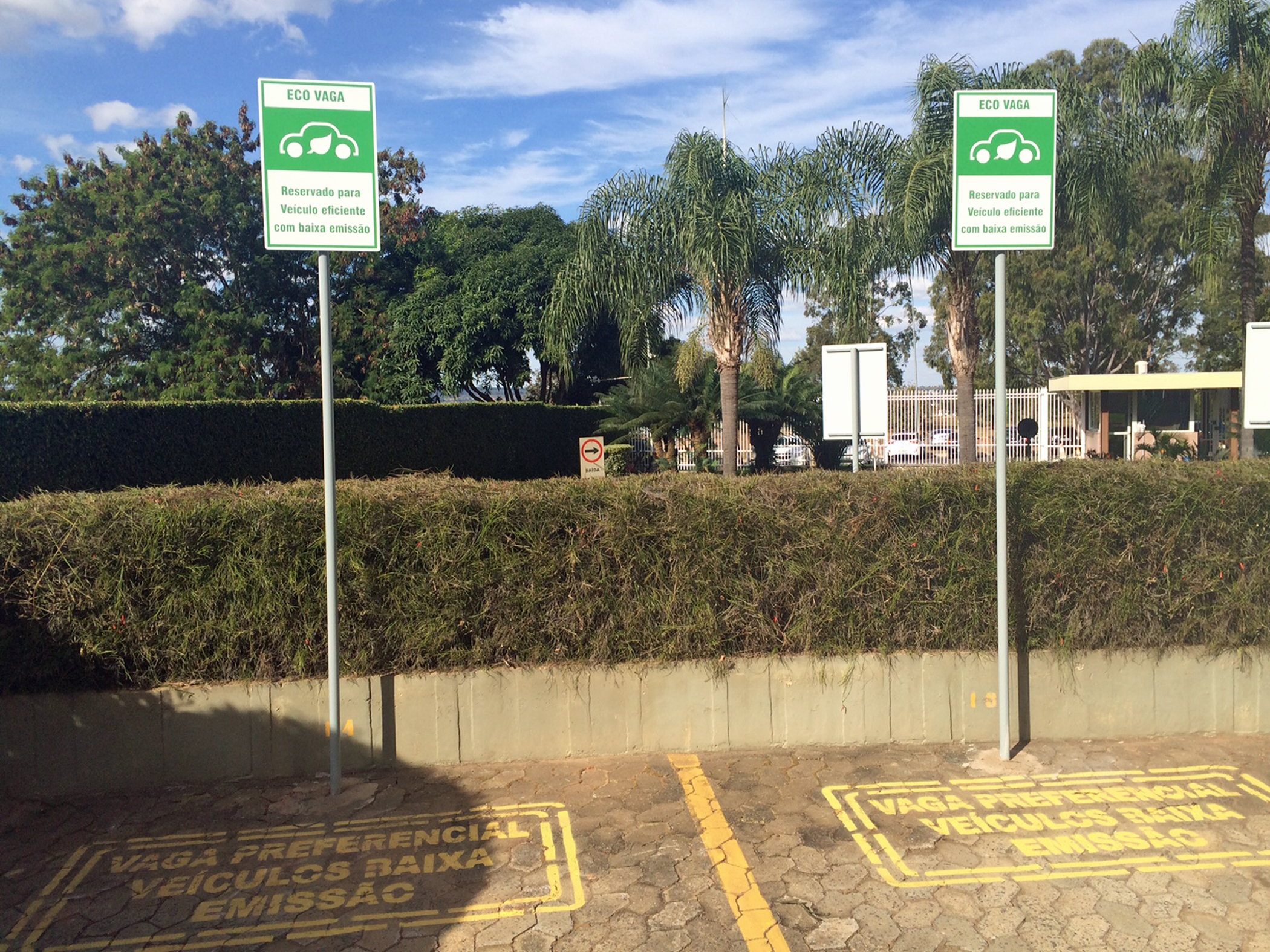
Eco Vagas: parking spaces reserved for low emissions vehicles in Brasília.

As of September 2015, 2,214 hybrid and electric vehicles were registered in the state of São Paulo In March 2013, the first two Leafs were deployed in Rio de Janeiro to operate as taxis. In September 2014 the BMW i3 became the first EV available for retail customers. As of June 2016, other retail plug-ins were the BMW i8 and the Mitsubishi Outlander P-HEV.

Plug-ins and hybrids are subject to taxes totaling more than 120% of the retail price.

In May 2014, São Paulo City passed a municipal law to exempt EVs, hybrids, and fuel cell vehicles from the city's driving restriction scheme (see also road space rationing#São Paulo) and purchase incentives.

In April 2018, the city of São José dos Campos ordered 30 electric BYD vehicles for use by the police and government.

In March 2019, Renault released the Zoe in Brazil, and, in April 2019, Jac released the E40 as the cheapest electric car in Brazil, at R$129.990, Nissan announced the Leaf to be released in Brazil in the first half of 2019

== Bulgaria ==
There were 560 electric motorbikes and 520 electric cars officially registered in Bulgaria by the end of March 2018. By early 2020, the total number of electric cars in Bulgaria is estimated to be at least 1100. Sales of new battery electric vehicles (BEV) rose from 21 in 2015 to 194 in 2018, with only 6 in 2016. In the first half of 2019, 141 new BEVs were sold, representing 0.7% of the overall sales.

Total of new battery electric vehicles registered per year
Year	2015	2016	2017	2018	SEM 1 2019
Total new BEV registrations	21	6	68	194	141
% of total new registrations	not available	not available	0.2%	0.5%	0.7%

The government does not provide grants for buying electric cars, but at least it does not apply road tax to them. Parking electric vehicles in central urban parking zones is also free of charge.

In 2012, 'green taxi' hybrid cabs went into service in Sofia. In 2017, test electric buses joined the public transport fleet of Sofia and in 2018 and 2019, 35 new electric buses went into service. It is estimated that by 2021, 20% of the bus fleet of Sofia will be electric. Other cities and towns such as Plovdiv, Pernik and Haskovo are also ordering electric buses.

The first car sharing company in Bulgaria, Spark.bg, uses only electric cars. As of August 2020, it has a fleet of around 500 electric vehicles and over 200 available charging stations in Sofia. Courier company Speedy uses 20 electric Renault Kangoo.

== Canada ==
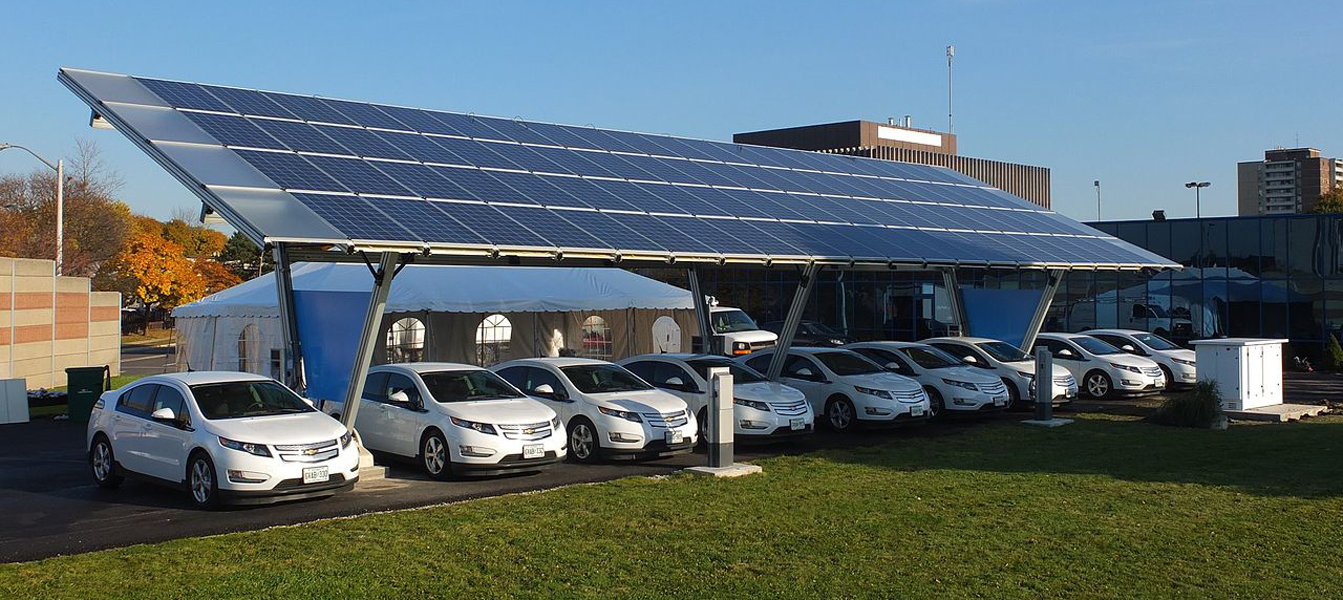
The Chevrolet Volt is the all-time top selling EV in Canada. Shown here is a fleet of Volts at a solar-powered charging station in Toronto.

The stock of plug-in electric passenger cars in Canada in use totaled 901,545 units as of April 2025, consisting of 644,679 all-electric cars and 256,866 plug-in hybrids. This represents 3.4% of all light-duty vehicles in Canada. Sales had a 15.3% market share in 2024 (11.4% for all-electric cars and 3.9% for plug-in hybrids), but are expected to decrease in 2025.

Purchase and other incentives for new EVs are offered by the provinces of Quebec and British Columbia.

In October 2016, Quebec passed legislation that obliges major carmakers to offer an increasing number of PHEV and BEV models, beginning with 3.5% in 2018 and rising to 15.5% in 2020, using a tradable credit system.

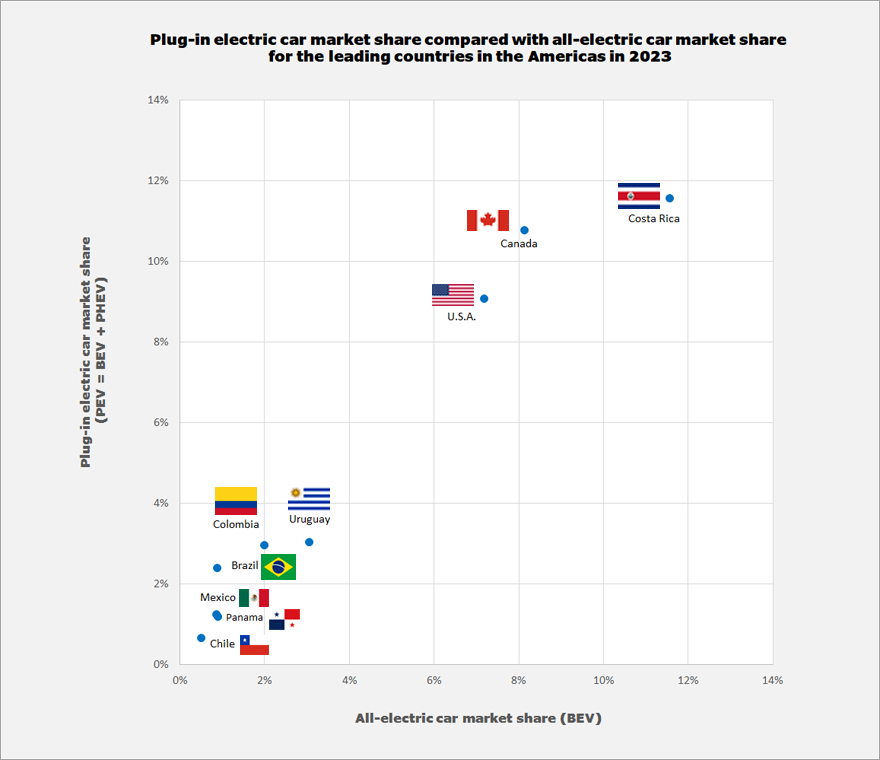
Canada had the second largest plug-in electric passenger car market share in the Americas in 2023

== China ==
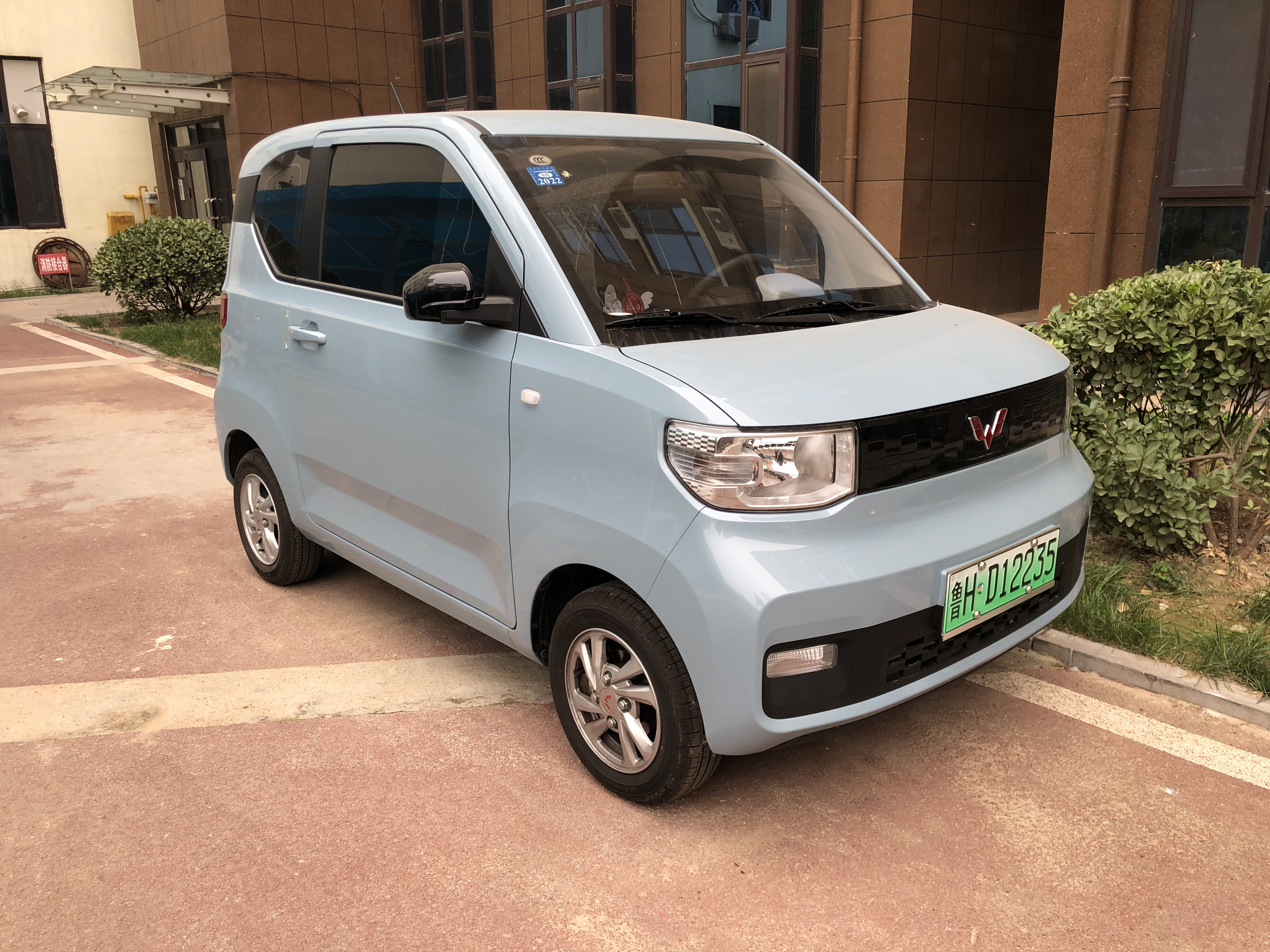
The Wuling Hongguang Mini EV all-electric car is listed as the best-selling plug-in car in China in 2021

As of 2025, China had the world's largest stock of highway legal plug-in passenger cars with 44 million units, corresponding to almost half of the global plug-in car fleet in use. Of these, all-electric cars accounted for 66% of the all-new energy passenger cars in circulation. The plug-in car segment achieved a record 53% market share in 2025. Plug-in passenger cars represented 14% of all cars on Chinese roads in 2025.

Sales of electric vehicles reached 13 million units in 2025, and more than 60% of all car sales were electric in July 2026. Domestically produced cars dominate new energy car sales in Mainland China, accounting for about 96% of sales in 2017. Another particular feature of the Chinese passenger plug-in market is the dominance of small entry level vehicles.

As of 2025, China also dominated the plug-in light commercial vehicle and electric bus deployment, with its stock reaching 710,000 buses, 87% of the global stock, and 380,000 electric light commercial vehicles, 25% of the global fleet. In addition, the country leads in sales of electric trucks, with over 400,000 sold in 2025.

== Chile ==
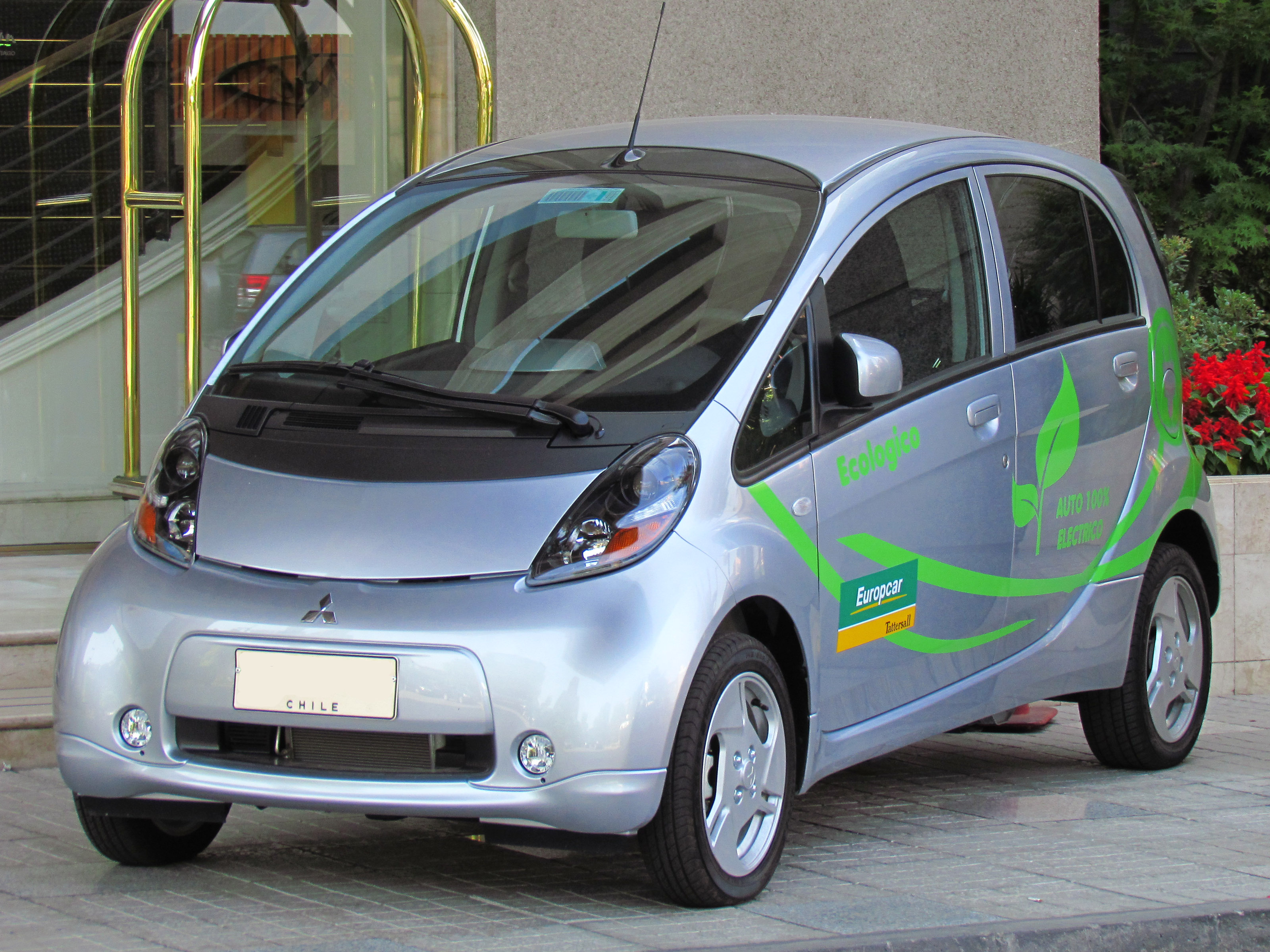
Mitsubishi i-MiEV in Chile

In Chile, electromobility has grown has gained visible momentum in recent years. According to the National Automotive Association of Chile (ANAC), battery-electric vehicles and plug-in hybrids accounted for 2.8% of the market for new light- and medium-duty vehicles in 2025, while as of May 2026, plug-in technologies represented nearly 6.1% of cumulative sales.

The country has also established itself as a regional leader in electric buses: Santiago’s RED Movilidad system reported in 2025 a network of electric bus terminals and an expanding electric fleet. The projection for 2026 is to reach 4,400 buses to serve nearly 6 million public transit users.

The National Electromobility Strategy 2030, updated by the Ministry of Energy in June 2026, maintains the goal that 100% of light- and medium-duty vehicle sales be zero-emission by 2035 and incorporates an interim target of 20% by 2030. Government measures include energy efficiency standards for new light-duty vehicles, partial exemption from vehicle registration fees, co-financing programs such as Mi Taxi Eléctrico, public-private partnerships, and the Public Charging Infrastructure Master Plan to expand the national network of charging stations.

The Mitsubishi i-MiEV was the first EV in Chile. The first public quick charging station was opened in April 2011.

== Colombia ==
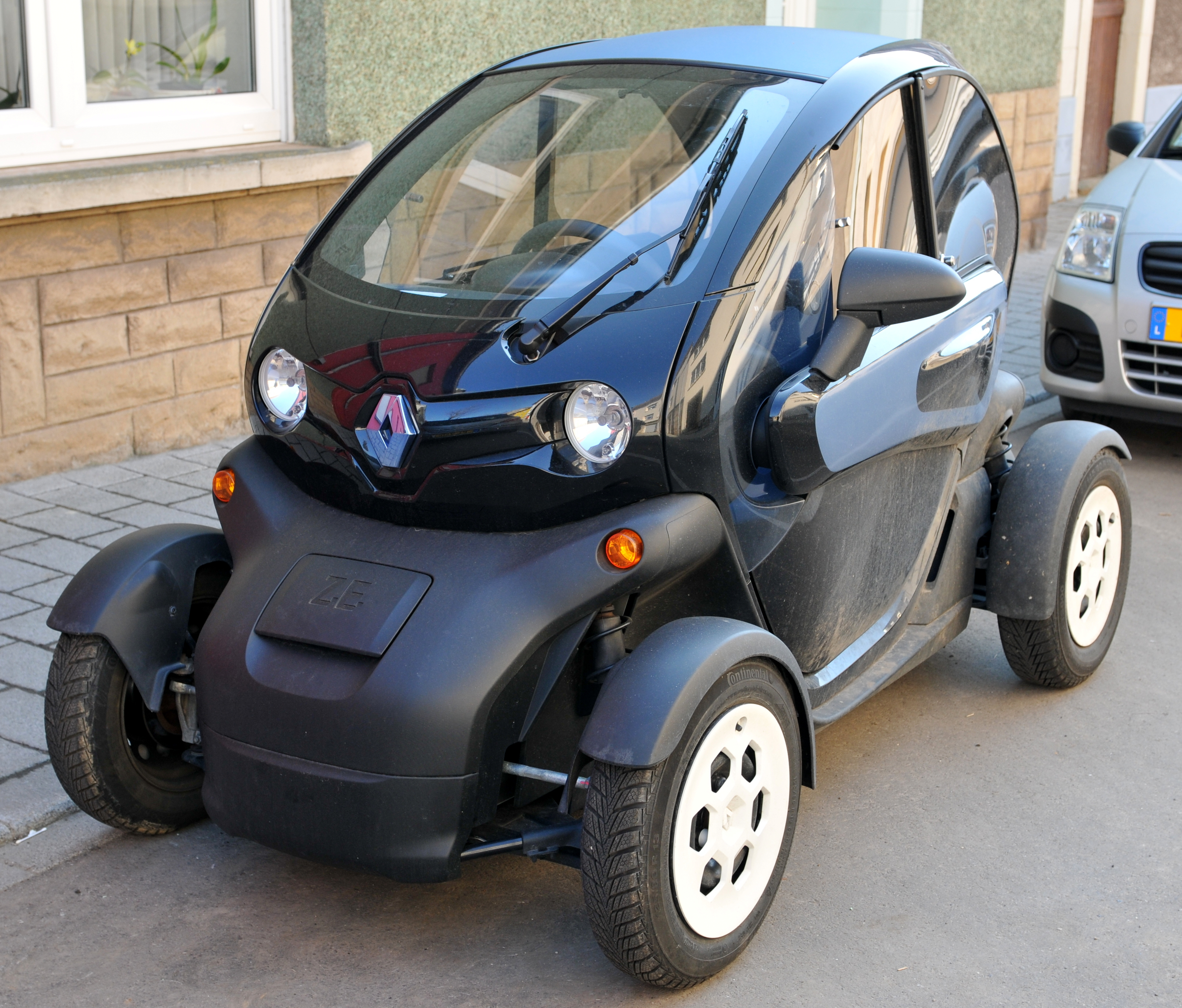
The BEV Renault Twizy quadricycle is the top-selling electric vehicle in Colombia.

Latin America's first battery electric taxi fleet of 45 vehicles was launched at the beginning of 2013 in Bogotá, the largest electric taxi fleet in South America at the time. These taxis were exempted from the Pico y placa driving restriction scheme. The program is an effort to improve air quality and set an example.

The BMW i3 was introduced in Colombia in 2014. The BEV Renault Twizy quadricycle was introduced in the Colombian market in June 2015 and, as of October 2015, 203 Twizys had been sold. Sales of the Outlander P-HEV were scheduled to begin in September 2015. Sales of other electric vehicles totaled, as of June 2015, 35 Mitsubishi i-MiEVs (purchased by an electricity company), 25 BMW i3s, 19 Renault Kangoos (corporate purchases), and 4 Nissan Leafs (corporate purchases).

In 2013, the government established incentives to promote EV adoption. These include the exemption from the driving restriction scheme in place in Colombian cities such as Bogotá and Medellín. The government exempted BEV and PHEV cars from import duties for three years, with an annual quota of 750 cars of each type.

== Costa Rica ==
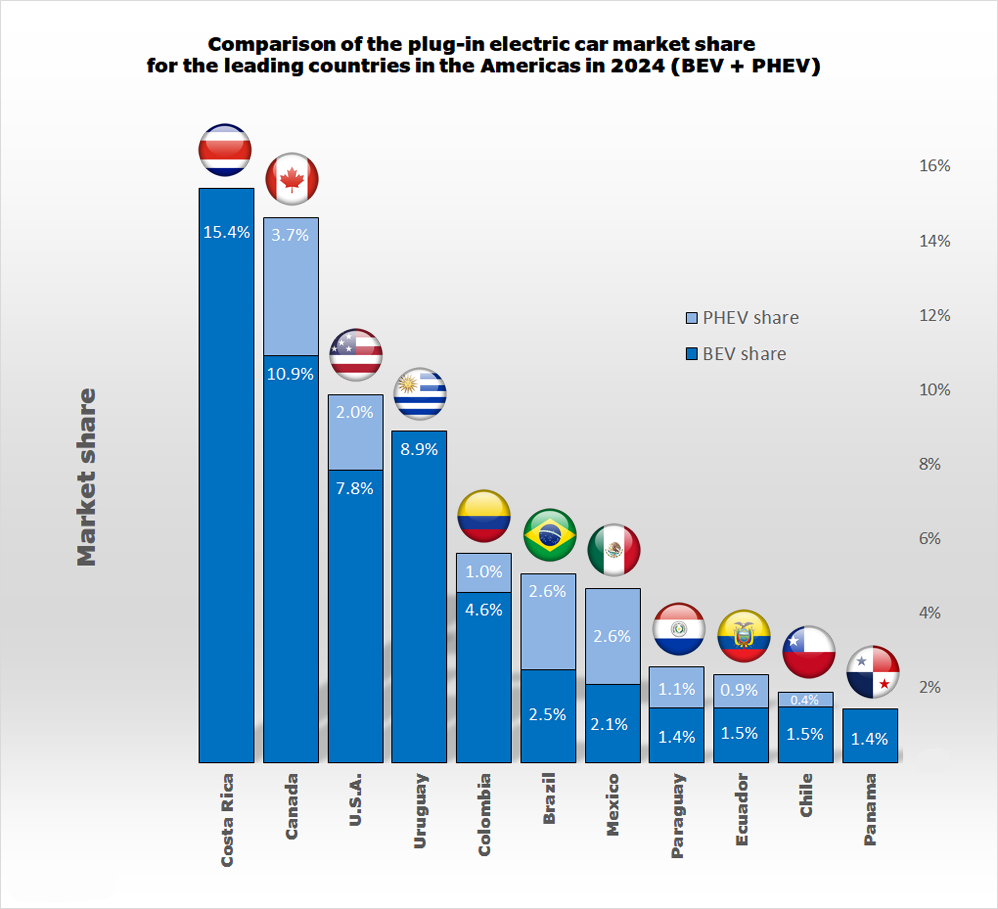
Costa Rica led the market share of the plug-in electric passenger car segment in the Americas in 2024.

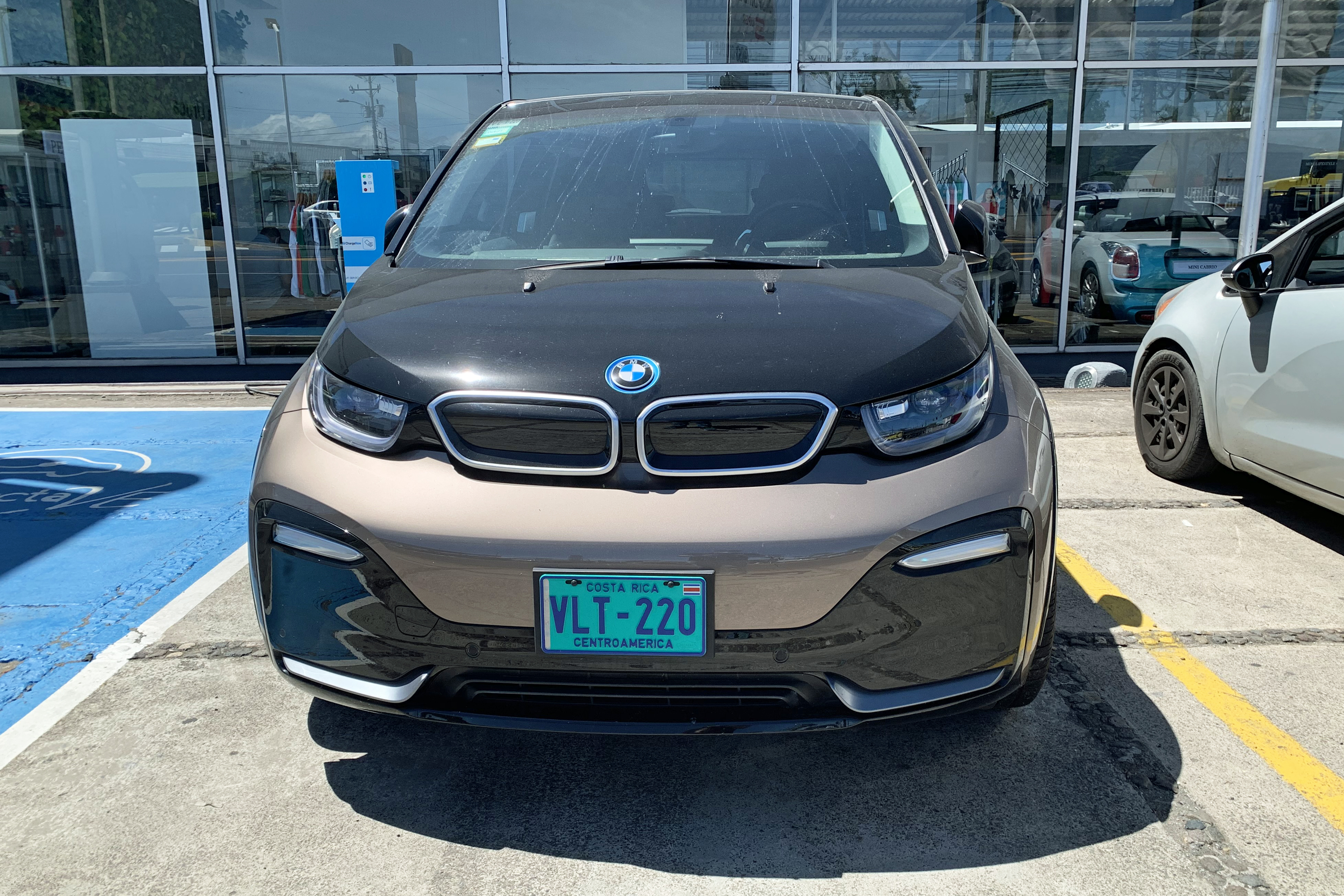
Fully electric BMW i3 with special green plates issued in Costa Rica for battery electric vehicles

As of December 2023, Costa Rica had a stock of 9,345 light-duty all-electric vehicles. In addition, the country had a stock of 1,243 all-electric motorcycles. Registrations of light-duty all-electric vehicles totaled 6,312 units in 2023, more than doubling cumulative sales since 2010. The all-electric market share achieved a record 11.6% of all new car sales in 2023, up from 7.3% in 2022, and ranking as the highest in the Americas.

The fleet of fully electric passenger cars grew from 94 units in 2010 to 183 in 2017. After the approval of the 2018 law granting import duty and value-added tax exemptions, the fleet grew from 377 units in 2018 to 1,446 in 2020, and reached 8,963 all-electric cars registered by the end of 2023. Plug-in hybrids and conventional hybrid electric vehicles do not have government financial incentives, and they are not included in this statistical data.

The first electric car to go on sale in the country was the REVAi, introduced in March 2009. The REVAi, powered by lead–acid batteries, sold 10 units. The Mitsubishi i MiEV was launched in February 2011, with initial availability limited to 25 to 50 units. According to Mitsubishi, Costa Rica was selected at the first market launch in the Americas due to its environmental record, despite the lack of government incentives for purchasing electric cars. The top selling model in 2016 was the Mitsubishi Outlander P-HEV with 60 units.

Other all-electric and plug-in hybrid cars introduced early in Costa Rica include the BYD Qin (November 2013), Mitsubishi Outlander (March 2015) and BMW i3 (September 2016). As of January 2024, over 50 all-electric models are offered in the Costa Rican market, mainly from Chinese and European carmakers.

Government incentives

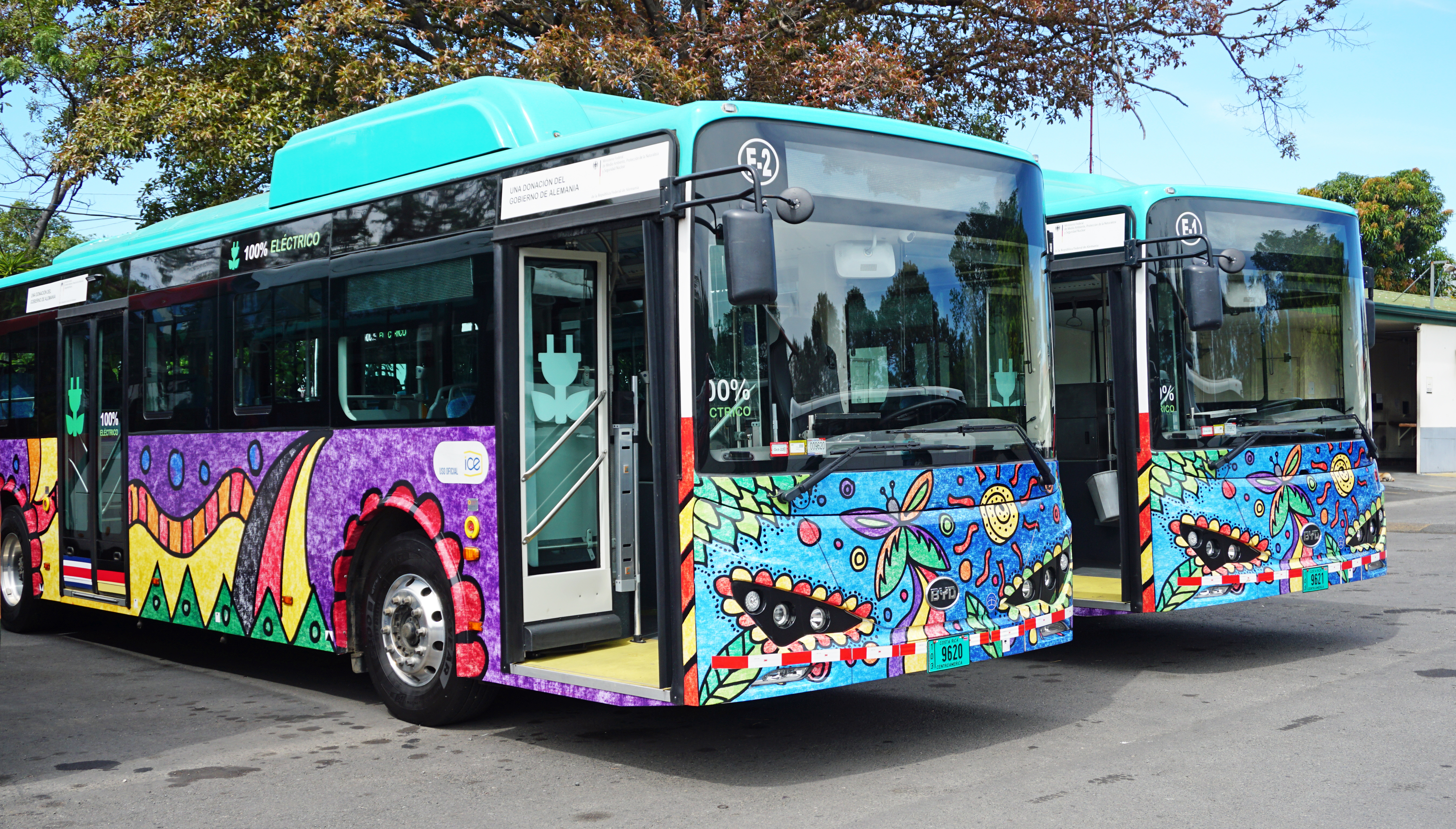
All-electric buses on trial as part of a pilot project in Costa Rica

In 2006, electric cars were exempted from the consumption tax, while conventional vehicles faced a 30% rate. In October 2012, electric cars were exempted from San José's driving restrictions. EVs were exempted from import duties and the government agreed to deploy charging stations in strategic locations in San José.

In January 2018, the "Law for the Promotion of Electric Transportation" took effect, offering incentives and tax exemptions for the purchase of all-electric cars. The law grants exemption from three taxes: value added, selective consumption, and import duties, 100% for electric vehicles priced at US$30,000 CIF, and the exempted percentage is reduced gradually as the value goes up, with a cap of US$60,000. Electric vehicles are also exempt from the annual circulation fee, which phases out by 20% each year during a five-year period. The price cap was removed in 202. Each tax exemption gradually decreases over 12 years until it is phased out.

== Croatia ==
As of December 2016, 2067 electric cars had been sold in Croatia. Of these, 224 were EVs, while the rest were hybrids. As of September 2017, 201 free public charging stations operated in Croatia.

In 2014 and 2015, the Croatian government initiated purchase incentives. The subsidies were discontinued in 2016, due to ineffectiveness.

== Czech Republic ==
Sales of new battery electric vehicles (BEV) rose from 298 in 2015 to 703 in 2018. In the first half of 2019, 360 new BEVs were sold, representing 0.3% of overall sales.

Total of new battery electric vehicles registered per year
Year	2015	2016	2017	2018	SEM 1 2019
Total new BEV registrations	298	200	387	703	360
% of total new registrations	not available	not available	0.1%	0.3%	0.3%

== Denmark ==
In the late 1980s to early 1990s, a few thousand of the small, one-person and locally produced Ellert were sold in Denmark, but relatively few remain today. In the following decade, very few electric cars were sold in Denmark, but a clear increase began around 2010. In 2015, Denmark was the second largest European market for light-duty, plug-in commercial vehicles or utility vans, with over 2,600 plug-in vans sold that year, representing 8.5% of all vans sold. Most vans were plug-in hybrids, accounting for almost all EU plug-in van sales.

Up to and including 2015, electric cars had been exempt from vehicle registration tax. Still, it was decided that this would be gradually outphased: In 2016, the vehicle registration tax for electric cars was set at 20% of the normal rate; in 2017, it was planned to increase to 40%; and within five years, it would become the full rate. This had a large effect on sales, which fell sharply in 2016–17. As a consequence, it was decided that the increase in vehicle registration tax for electric vehicles would be delayed, being capped at 20% of the normal rate in 2017–19, then gradually increasing until 2023 where it would become the full rate. A new fund for fuel cell vehicles was also established.

In 2020, a new taxation deal was reached, valid for all cars from 2021 to 2030. Its rates depend heavily on the car's CO_{2} emissions. This means that vehicle registration tax for all-electric cars (BEVs) that cost less than 510,000 DKK (€68,500) will remain very low with a slower than initially planned gradual increase to normal levels, most plug-in hybrids (PHEVs) will increase from 2021 but remain lower than gasoline and diesel cars, and diesel cars will increase. The goal of this plan is to have at least 775,000 electric cars (BEV or PHEV) by 2030. With other plans, the goal is to have at least 1 million zero-emission or low-emission cars by 2030, and to have no new gasoline or diesel cars sold in the country from that year.

As of 31 December 2021, there were a total of 2,781,855 registered cars in Denmark, of which more than 5%, or 144,498, are electric (BEV or PHEV).

Total of new battery electric vehicles registered per year
Year	2015	2016	2017	2018	2019	2020	2021
Total new BEV registrations	4329	1316	698	1545	5524	14219	24917
BEV % of total new registrations	2.1%	0.6%	0.3%	0.7%	2.4%	7.1%	13.4%
Total new PHEV registrations	–	–	620	3127	3885	18235	40464
PHEV % of total new registrations	–	–	0.3%	1.4%	1.7%	9.2%	21.8%

== Estonia ==
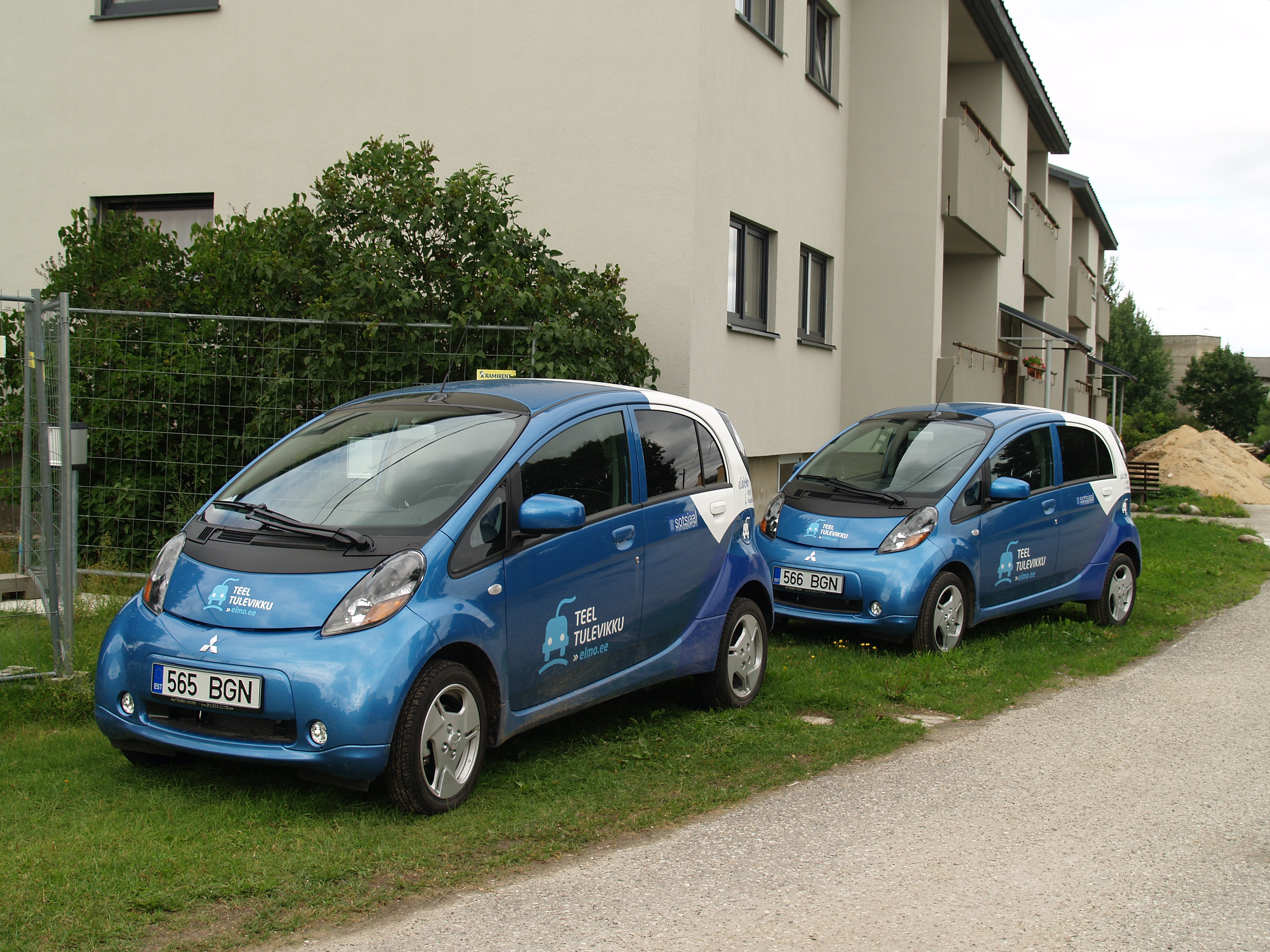
Two Mitsubishi i-MiEVs in Estonia. The majority of electric cars in Estonia are i-MiEVs.

As of February 2015, 1,188 plug-in vehicles were registered.

Estonia was the first country to deploy an EV charging network with nationwide coverage, with fast chargers available along highways at a maximum distance of 40 to 60 km (25 to 37 mi). As of December 2012, the nationwide network consisted of 165 fast chargers.

In 2011, the government confirmed the sale of 10 million carbon dioxide credits to Mitsubishi in exchange for 507 i-MiEV electric cars. The deal included funding 250 fast charging stations and subsidies for the first 500 private buyers of any electric approved by the EU. The first 50 i-MiEVs were delivered in October 2011, for use by municipal social workers.

Sales of new battery electric vehicles (BEV) rose from 34 in 2015 to 85 in 2018, after a stagnation in 2016 and 2017. In the first half of 2019, 42 new BEVs were sold, representing 0.2% of overall sales.

Total of new battery electric vehicles registered per year
Year	2015	2016	2017	2018	SEM 1 2019
Total new BEV registrations	34	35	26	85	42
% of total new registrations	not available	not available	0.1%	0.3%	0.2%

Estonia's figures are low compared to other advanced economies, attributed to lack of government incentives after the carbon credit scheme was exhausted.

== Ecuador ==
The offer and demand for electric vehicles in the South American nation has decreased. Electric charging stations are present in several shopping malls and public parking in Guayaquil, Quito, Cuenca, Ambato, and Loja.

In Ecuador, all electric vehicles are exempt from customs duties and taxes starting in June 2019. The electric vehicle offer in the country is set to increase. The Ecuadorean government has been incentivizing the use of electric vehicles with tax cuts. However, both the offer and demand remained short, encouraging the government to eliminate all duties on electric vehicles.

The first commercially available EV was the Kia Soul EV in 2016. At the moment, the brand with the most EV presence in Ecuador is. As of 2021, Kia, BYD, and Nissan are among the EV brands offering vehicles for the Ecuadorian market.

== Europe overview ==
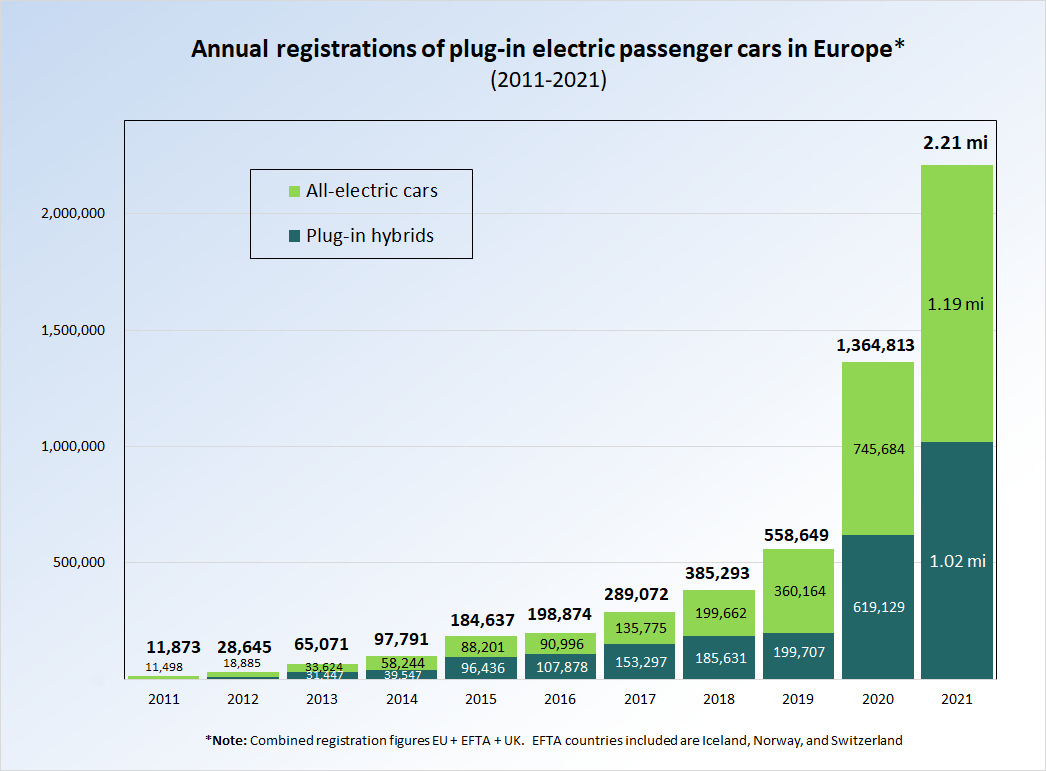
Evolution of annual registrations of plug-in electric passenger cars in Europe between 2011 and 2021

Europe had about 5.6 million plug-in electric passenger cars and light commercial vehicles in circulation at the end of 2021. As of December 2019, Europe accounted for 25% of the global stock, the second largest after China. Europe also had the world's second-largest electric light commercial vehicle stock after China, with about 220,000 vans.

The 27 Member States of the European Union had 2.24 million plug-in vehicles on the road in 2020, of which plug-in passenger cars represented 94.3%, followed by light commercial vehicles (5.4%), and buses and trucks accounted for 0.3% and 0.03% respectively. In 2020, despite the strong decline in global car sales due to the COVID-19 pandemic, annual sales of plug-in passenger cars in Europe surpassed the 1 million mark for the first time. In addition, Europe outsold China in 2020 as the world's largest plug-in passenger car market for the first time since 2015. Despite the continued global decline in car sales in 2021 due to the shortages related to the COVID-19 pandemic, and the global computer chip shortage, plug-in car sales rose to 2.27 million, up 66% from 2020.

The plug-in car segment had a market share of 1.3% of new car registrations in 2016, rose to 3.6% in 2019, climbed to 11.4% in 2020, and achieved 29.1% in 2025. As of December 2021, Germany has the largest stock of plug-ins in Europe, with cumulative sales of 1.38 million plug-in cars registered since 2010, followed by France (786,274), the UK (≈745,000), Norway (647,000), and the Netherlands (360,000). Germany listed as the top selling European country market since 2019.

== Finland ==
As of October 2016, about 2,250 EVs were registered. Sales of new battery electric vehicles (BEV) rose from 243 in 2015 to 776 in 2018. In the first half of 2019, 995 new BEVs were sold, representing 1.7% of the overall sales.

Total of new battery electric vehicles registered per year
Year	2015	2016	2017	2018	2019	2020
Total new BEV registrations	243	222	502	776	1897	4244
% of total new registrations	not available	not available	0.4%	0.6%	1.7%	4.4%

In November 2016, the government set the goal of 250,000 plug-in cars and 50,000 biogas cars on the road by 2030. These goals are part of the Finnish government efforts to comply with the 2015 Paris Agreement.

Basic charging infrastructure is available throughout Finland for winter engine pre-warming. Because of its climate – cold winters and warm summers – Finland is considered a convenient "test laboratory" for electric cars.

Many companies in Finland are involved in next-generation vehicle manufacturing, including Valmet Automotive, Fortum (concept cars and infrastructure), Vacon (electric motor technology production), Ensto (production of charging units), Elcat (electric vehicle production since the 1980s), Raceabout (specialist electric sport car with very few sales).

Research related to electric cars is in progress at the VTT Technical Research Centre of Finland and Tekes.

Electric car organizations in Finland include the Electric Vehicle Association of Finland and Electric Vehicles Finland. A non-commercial electric car conversion organization is called Electric Cars – Now! that converts Toyota Corollas into Li-ion battery-powered electric cars.

== France ==
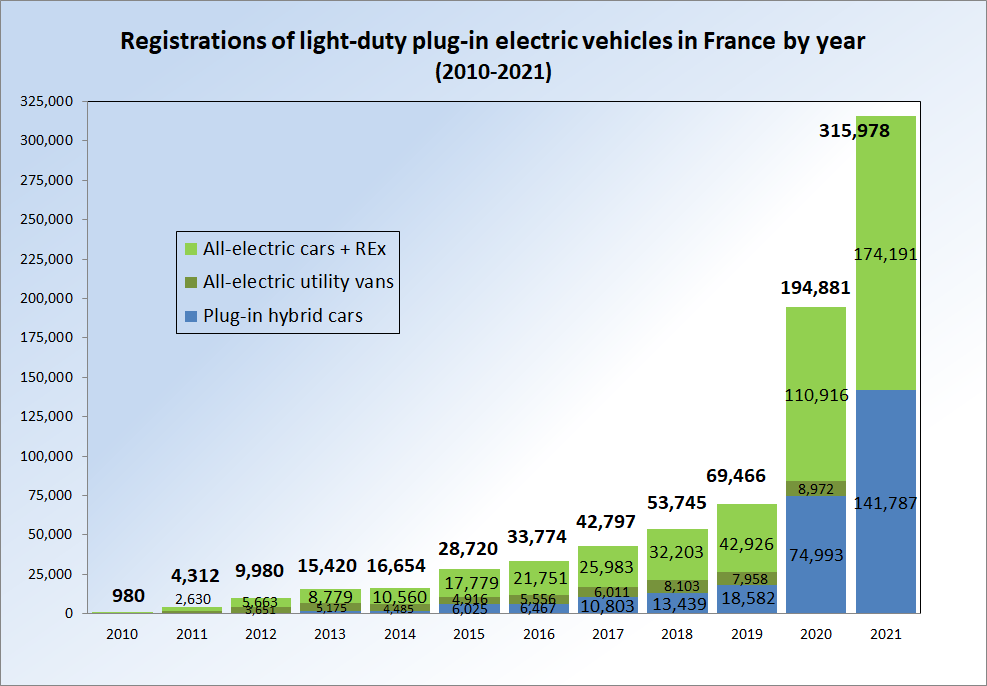
Registration of light-duty plug-in vehicles in France by type of vehicle between 2010 and 2021

As of December 2021, a total of 786,274 light-duty plug-in electric vehicles have been registered in France since 2010, consisting of 512,178 all-electric passenger cars and commercial vans, and 274,096 plug-in hybrids. Of these, around 60,000 were fully electric light commercial vehicles.

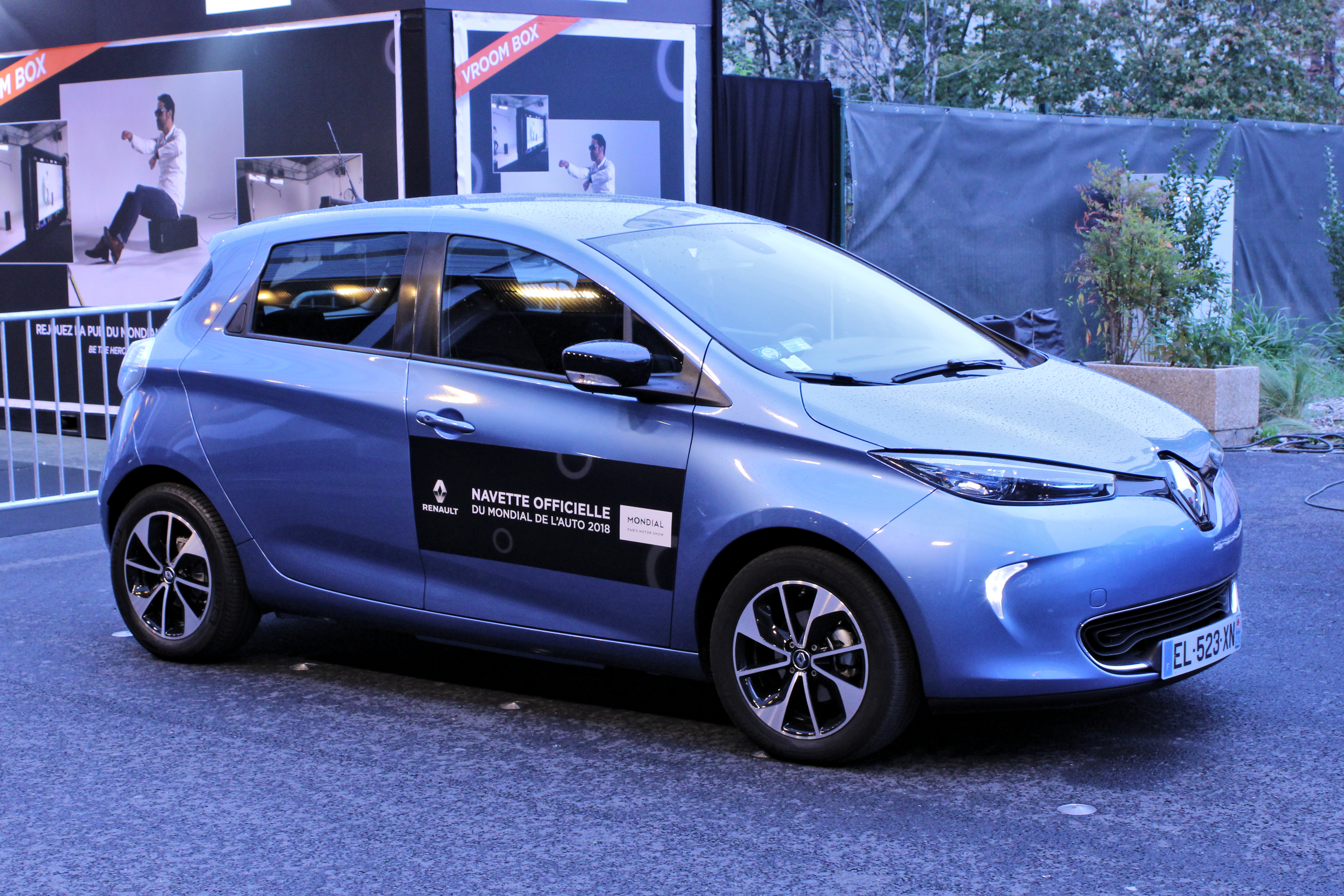
The Renault Zoe has led electric car sales in France since 2013, and is the country's all-time best-selling plug-in with more than 100,000 units registered through June 2020.

A record 315,978 light-duty plug-in vehicles were registered in 2021, up 62% from 2020, and the light-duty segment's market share rose to 15.1%. The plug-in electric passenger car segment achieved a market share of 18.3% in 2021.

== Germany ==
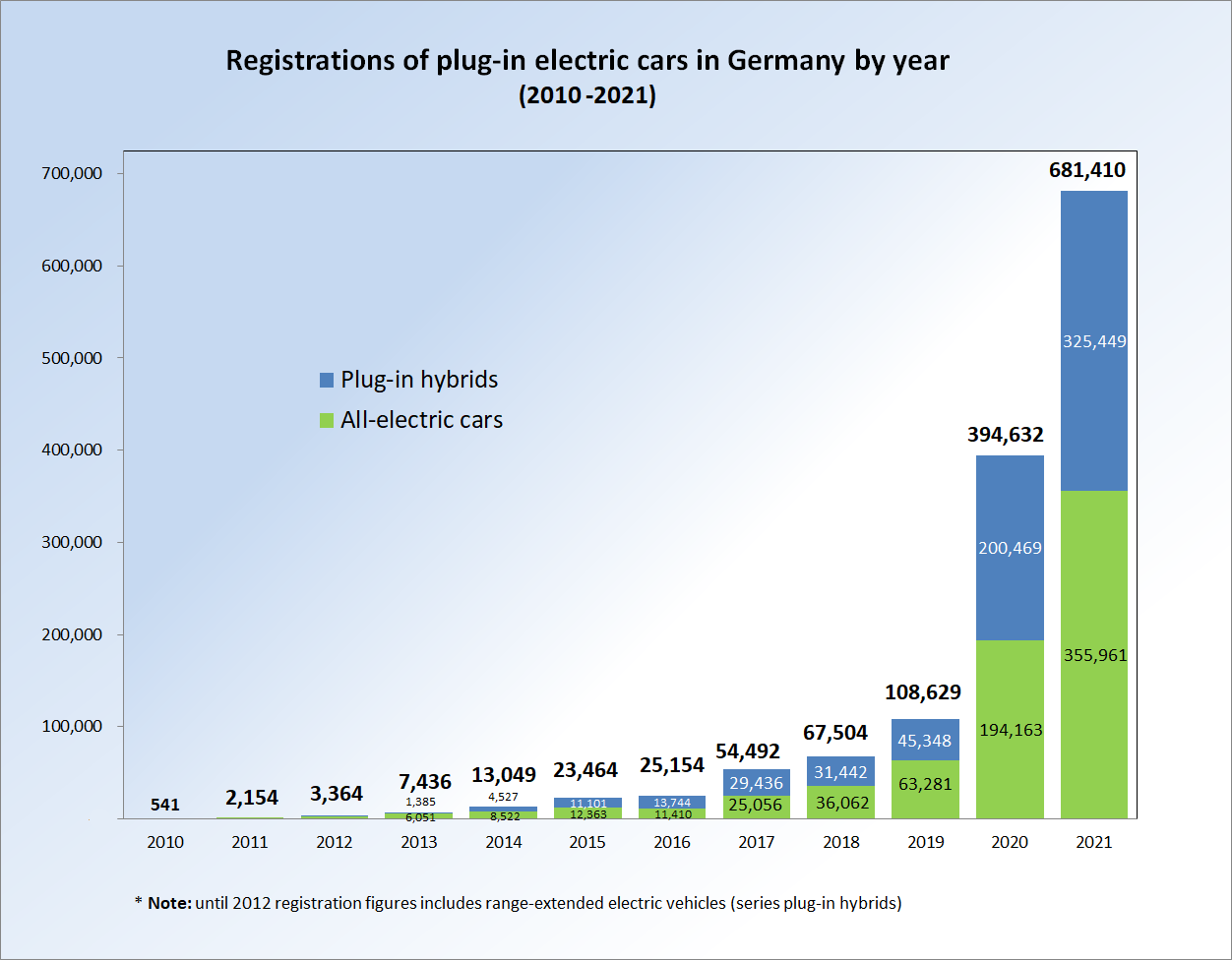
Annual registration of plug-in cars in Germany by type of vehicle between 2010 and 2021

The stock of plug-in electric vehicles in Germany is the largest in Europe; there were 1,184,416 plug-in cars in circulation on 1 January 2022, representing 2.5% of all passenger cars on German roads, up from 1.2% the previous year. As of December 2021, cumulative sales totaled 1.38 million plug-in passenger cars since 2010. Germany had a stock of 21,890 light-duty electric commercial vehicles in 2019, the second largest in Europe after France. As of March 2020, the country had 27,730 public charging stations.

Germany was the top-selling plug-in car market in Europe in 2019, with a market share of 3.10%. Despite the global decline in car sales brought by the COVID-19 pandemic, the segment market share achieved a record 13.6% in 2020. with a record volume of 394,632 plug-in passenger cars registered in 2020, up 263% from 2019, Germany was listed for a second year running as the best-selling European plug-in market. Both years, the German market led both the fully electric and plug-in hybrid segments. The only country that outsold Germany in 2020 was China. Sales in 2021 surged to 681,410 rechargeable units, capturing a record market share of 26.0%.

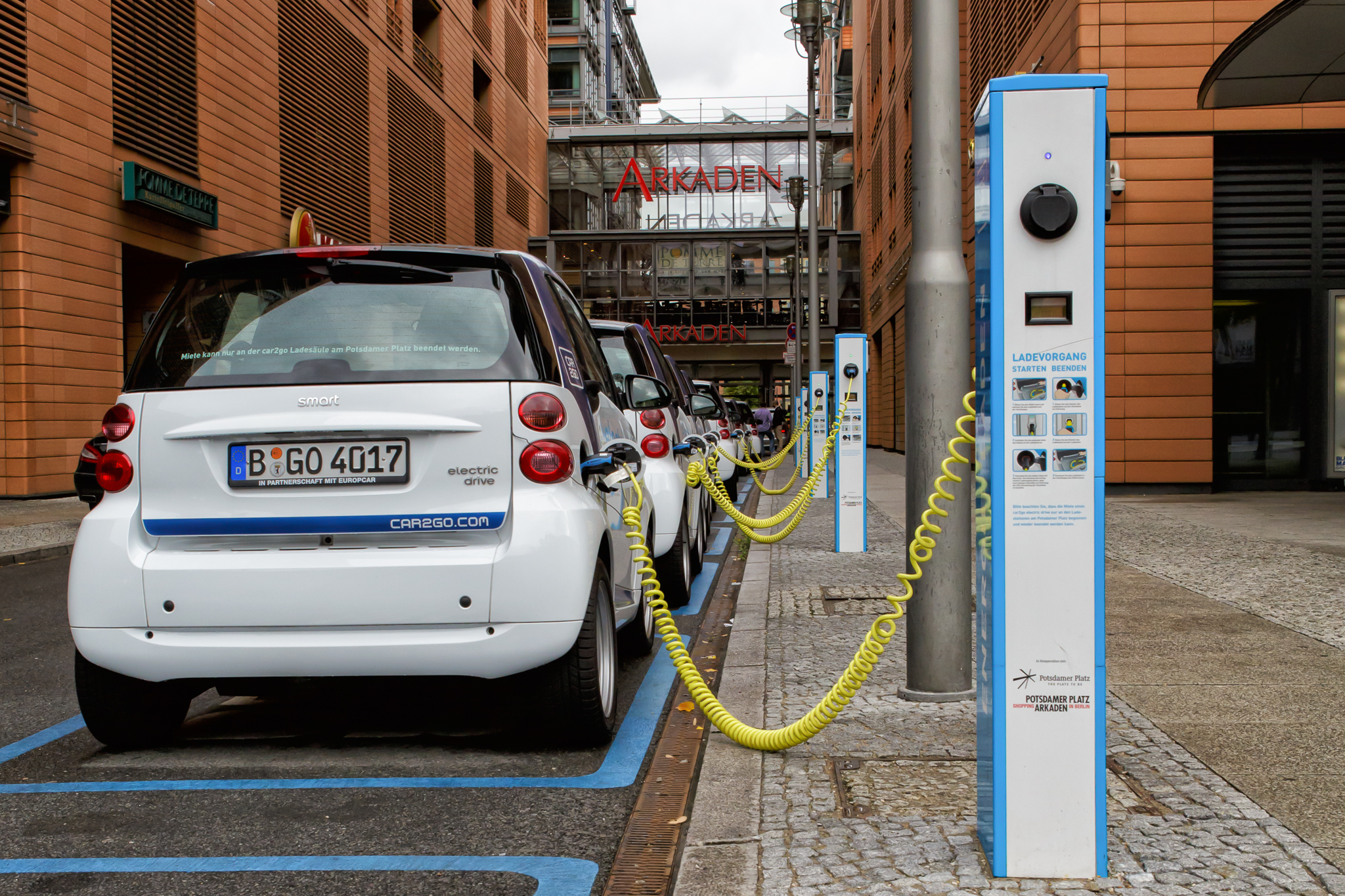
The Smart electric drive led the plug-in electric car segment in Germany until 2013.

Under its National Platform for Electric Mobility, Chancellor Angela Merkel in 2010 set the goal of putting one million electric vehicles on German roads by 2020. Initially, the government did not provide subsidies in favor of research. The Bundestag passed the Electric Mobility Act in March 2015 that authorized local government to grant non-monetary incentives. The measures privilege battery-powered cars, fuel cell vehicles, and some PHEVs by granting local governments the authority to offer additional incentives.

An incentive scheme was approved in April 2016, including purchase subsidies, charging stations, and other federal government fleet purchases, with a target of 400,000 electric vehicles. Premium cars, such as the Tesla Model S and BMW i8, were not eligible. To meet the climate targets for the transport sector, in 2016 the government set the goal to have from 7 to 10 million plug-in electric cars on the road by 2030, and 1 million charging points available in Germany also by 2030.

As a result of the economic impact of the COVID-19 pandemic, the government approved an economic recovery plan in June 2020 that included €8 billion to promote electric vehicle adoption and the deployment of charging infrastructure. The purchase bonus for electric cars was raised from €6,000 to €9,000 up until the end of 2021, the highest economic incentive in any European countr. Still, the subsidy is available only for cars costing less than €40,000. Also, other tax incentives for electric vehicles were introduced since 2020. Later, the government decided to keep the €9,000 bonus for the purchase of new all-electric cars and plug-in hybrids until the end of 2025. The original one million goal was achieved in July 2021.

== Greece ==
Sales of new battery electric vehicles (BEV) rose from 35 in 2015 to 190 in 2019. In the first three-quarters of 2020, 292 new BEVs and 590 new PHEVs were sold.

Total of new battery electric vehicles registered per year
Year	2015	2016	2017	2018	2019	SEM 1–3 2020
Total new BEV registrations	35	9	47	88	190	292
% of total new registrations	not available	not available	0.05%	0.09%		

In June 2020, Greek Prime Minister Kyriakos Mitsotakis announced the government's plan to support the adoption of new battery electric vehicles (BEV) and plug-in hybrid electric vehicles (PHEV) by individuals and corporations, with the aim for one-in-three new vehicles in Greece to be electric by 2030. The plan includes purchase subsidizing, exemption from the road tax and any parking fees, as well as incentives for setting up charging stations, for pure electric private passenger cars and motorbikes, as well as for pure electric or plug-in hybrid taxis and light commercial vehicles. The government's subsidy covers the purchase of new BEVs and PHEVs, with a total of 100 million euros for 18 months in the first phase, estimated to cover about 25% of the cost of about 14,000 new electric vehicles.

The government will subsidize the purchase of each new electric vehicle, covering 15% of its cost (up to €5.500) for private passenger and light commercial vehicles, 20% of the cost (up to €800) for motorbikes, and 25% of the cost (up to €8.000) for taxis. Vehicle owners who will concurrently retire their old vehicle will receive an additional bonus of up to €2.500. Furthermore, expenses for charging the electric car will be exempt from taxable income. The benefit for each new electric car, if combined with the ecological bonus and the relevant tax exemptions, will approach 10.000 euros.

== Hong Kong ==
As of June 2023 the total is 60,943 EVs. As of now, 240 EV models from 16 economies have been type-approved by the Transport Department. These include 187 models for private cars and motorcycles and 53 models for public transport and commercial vehicles.

As of December 2017, 10,666 plug-in vehicles were registered in Hong Kong. March 2017 saw 2,964 EVs registered in one month before the first registration tax exemption was repealed. 2,939 of these cars were Tesla Model S and X.

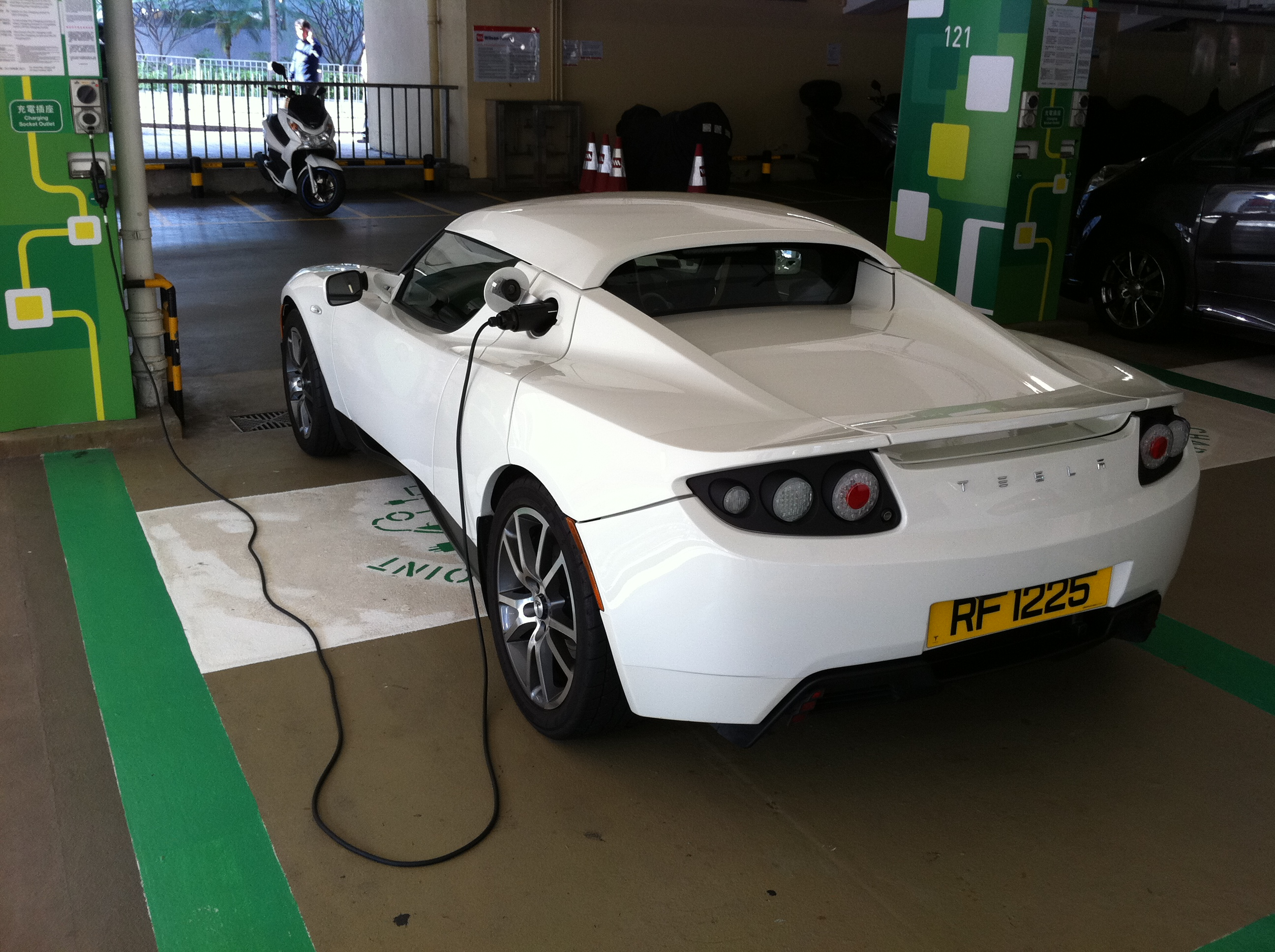
Tesla Roadster charging at Central Star Ferry carpark in Hong Kong

As of September 2016, 6,298 plug-in vehicles were on the roads in Hong Kong, up from 3,253 in October 2015. The plug-in segment market share achieved 4.8% of new car sales in Hong Kong in 2015.

As of October 2015, more than 1,200 public electric vehicle charging points were available. More than a dozen models were available for retail customers.

Sales of electric cars took off in Hong Kongin 2014, with the Tesla Model 4. The tax waiver made the Model S competitive in the luxury car segment, at about half the price of other high-end models. According to Tesla, as of September 2016, Hong Kong had the world's highest density of Tesla superchargers, giving most Model S owners a supercharger within a 20-minute drive.

The Government offered purchase incentives to consumers, businesses, and service providers from 2011 to 2017. The Government further allocated HK$180 million for bus companies to purchase 36 electric buses.

== Hungary ==
In November 2018, 8,482 PEVs were registered in Hungary. The Hungarian government introduced its e-mobility plan in March 2014. The Jedlik plan supported the domestic production of electric vehicles, expanding the necessary infrastructure and promoting the purchase of EVs with public incentives, including 1.5 million HUF, initiated at the end of 2016.

Sales of new passenger cars categorized as battery electric vehicles (BEV) rose from 115 in 2015 to 4837 in 2020.

Total of new battery electric vehicles registered per year
Year	2015	2016	2017	2018	2019	2020
Total new BEV registrations	115	172	749	1300	3280	4837
% of total new registrations	not available	not available	0.6%	1.0%	1.1%	1.8%

== Iceland ==
The plug-in car segment in Iceland reached 5.37% of all new vehicles registered in 2016, placing the country second in Europe after Norway that year. Registrations of new plug-in electric cars totaled 2,990 units in 2017, up 157% from the previous year. The segment's market share achieved a record 14%, globally, second only to Norway. The top selling plug-ins in 2017 were the Mitsubishi Outlander PHEV with 884 units and the Nissan Leaf with 524. In 2018, 284 new BEV units were sold and 423 in the first half of 2019, representing 5.8% of the overall new cars sales.

The government eliminated VAT (24%) and CO_{2}-based fees (up to 65%) on new car purchases for EVs.

As of 2017, Orka Náttúrunnar (ON) was working to complete a network of 50 kW CCS Combo/CHAdeMO stations along the Ring Road. Tesla opened its first supercharger in Reykjavík in December 2019, with 4 more planned around Iceland in 2020.

Tesla started deliveries in Iceland on 28 February 2020 and quickly became the number 1 new electric car sold in Iceland. As of March 2020 passenger plug-in market share of total new car sales for the year 2020 has reached 55%.

== India ==
As of March 2022, over 28000 plug-in cars were registered, until Mar 2022 out of a total of 1 million registered electric vehicles (including 2 and 3-wheelers and commercial 4-wheelers). The Indian government has the Faster Adoption and Manufacturing of Hybrid and Electric vehicles (FAME) scheme, which provides incentives for purchasing electric vehicles. Indian government has reduced GST rate on EVs from 12% to 5% in the Union Budget 2019 to encourage electric vehicles. The Indian government gives an additional tax benefit of Rs 150,000 on the interest paid on loans taken to buy EVs. The EVs in India are exempted from paying road tax for vehicle registration.

Electric vehicle (EV) adoption in India has accelerated significantly in recent years, supported by policy incentives and expanding infrastructure.

According to the Federation of Automobile Dealers Associations (FADA), EV retail sales in financial year 2025–26 (FY'26) reached 2.452 million (24.52 lakh) units, reflecting a 24.63% year-on-year growth across all vehicle segments.

Charging infrastructure has also expanded rapidly. India ended 2025 with around 29,000 public EV charging stations, and entering 2026, most official estimates place the total in the 29,000–30,000 range. According to the Ministry of Heavy Industries, a total of 29,151 electric vehicle charging stations have been installed across the country under various government initiatives, including FAME schemes.

The growth of EVs in India has been supported by initiatives such as the Faster Adoption and Manufacturing of Electric Vehicles (FAME) scheme, Production Linked Incentive (PLI) schemes for advanced chemistry cell (ACC) batteries, and state-level EV policies. In addition, EV charging has been classified as a de-licensed activity, enabling private sector participation and faster deployment of public charging infrastructure.

== Indonesia ==
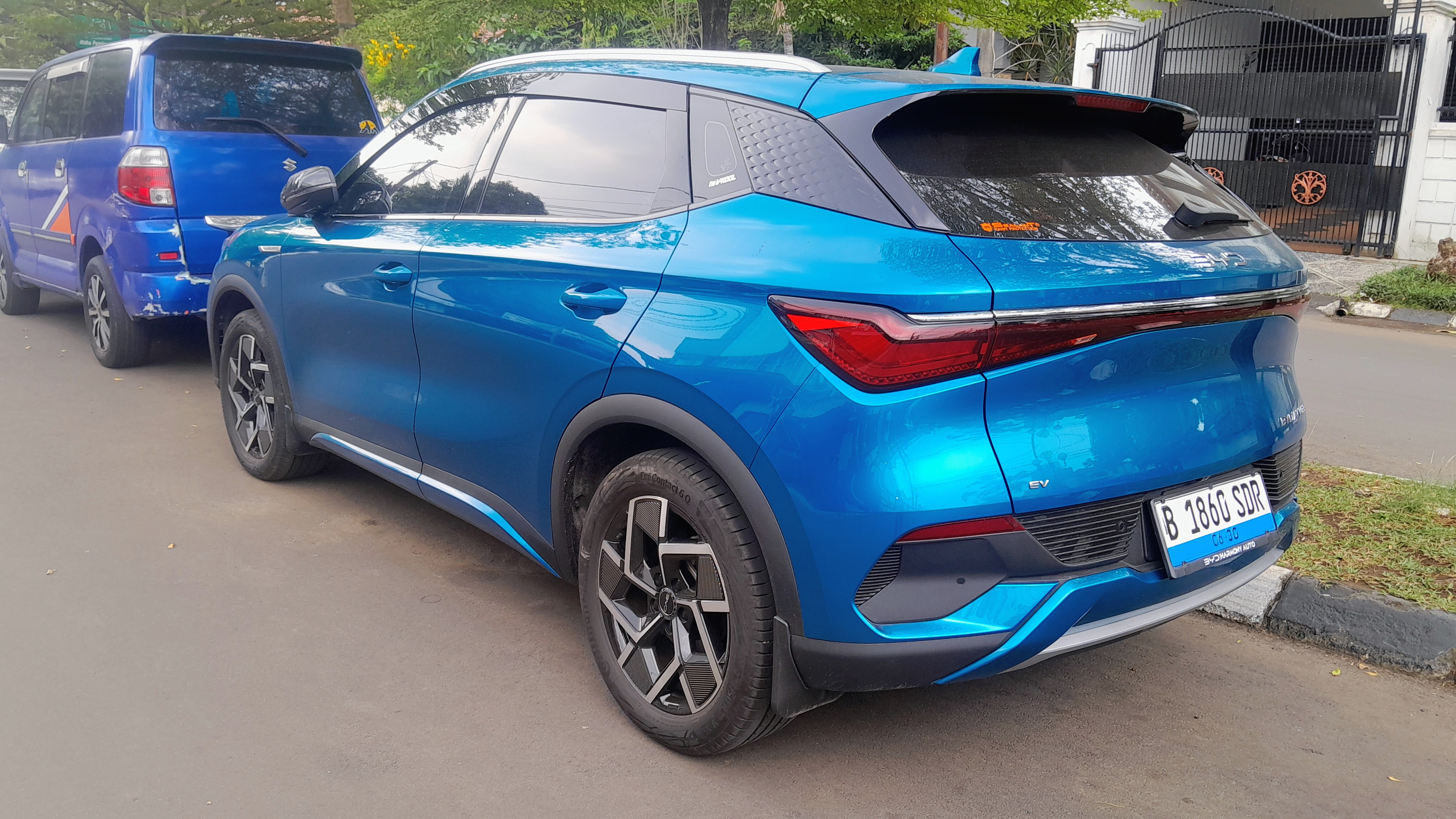
2024 BYD Atto 3 in Indonesia

The use of battery electric vehicles (BEVs) in Indonesia has grown rapidly since the early 2020s. Data from the Indonesian Automotive Industry Association (GAIKINDO) shows that BEV wholesale sales increased from 10,327 units in 2022 to 17,051 units in 2023, 43,188 units in 2024, and 103,931 units in 2025. In the first half of 2026, BEV wholesale sales reached 69,739 units.

Domestic production reached a milestone on March 16, 2022, when the Hyundai Ioniq 5 began production at the Hyundai Motor Manufacturing Indonesia plant in Bekasi. The government called it the first electric vehicle produced on an industrial scale in Indonesia; this statement differs from the history of previous research prototypes.

PLN, together with its partners, reported 4,655 public electric vehicle charging stations (SPKLU) at 3,007 locations by the end of 2025, an increase of about 44% from 3,223 units in 2024. The Directorate General of Electricity at the Ministry of Energy and Mineral Resources subsequently recorded approximately 4,892 four-wheeled SPKLUs nationwide in May 2026.

The 2017 National Energy Master Plan included one of the initial targets for electric vehicles. Presidential Regulation No. 55 of 2019 subsequently established a framework for accelerating the adoption of battery-powered electric vehicles for road transportation, including industrial development, incentives, charging infrastructure, technical regulations, and government coordination. Presidential Regulation No. 79 of 2023 amended a number of provisions, including phased local content requirements as well as investment support and local government assistance.

== Ireland ==
Sales of electric cars in Ireland increased more than four times in 2014 from a low base. Then, sales of new battery electric vehicles (BEV) rose from 466 in 2015 to 1233 in 2018. In the first half of 2019, 1,954 new BEVs were sold, representing 2.4% of overall sales.

Total of new battery electric vehicles registered per year
Year	2015	2016	2017	2018	2019	2020	2021	2022	2023	2024
Total new BEV registrations	466	392	622	1,233	3,444	4,013	8,646	15,678	22,852	17,459
% of total new registrations	not available	not available	0.5%	1.0%	2.94%	4.54%	8.24%	14.88%	18.66%	14.4%

The government committed to making 10% of all vehicles by 2020 (a projected 230,000 vehicles). Government officials reached agreements with French car maker Renault and its partner Nissan. As of September 2014, purchase incentives became available.

As of the start of 2020, Electric Vehicles (EVs) was as a proportion of all cars for sale in Ireland very small, which could be seen in a snapshot (7 February 2020) of four different car sales websites (Autotrader.ie, Carsireland.ie, Carzone.ie, and Donedeal.ie) which showed that out of circa 38,000 to 70,000 cars listed for sale, only circa 0.7% to 1.1% were EV's, so in real terms only 431–616 EV cars were advertised for sale in the market.

This very low level of EVs compared poorly to the circa 25,338 to 46,940 diesel cars shown available for sale on the same date, representing a much larger, circa 64–67% of the market at that time.

The Irish Government (to January 2020) had stated an aim to ban the sale of petrol, diesel and hybrid new ('non-electric') cars from 2030 (compared to the proposed EU ban by 2040, and the UK's proposed ban on the sale of new petrol, diesel and hybrid cars from 2035 as announced in the first week of February 2020). However, car dealers were reported in 2020 to consider the Irish Government's target of one million electric and plug-in hybrid cars in use by 2030 as far too ambitious. Still, Government grants of up to €10,000 were also available as of 2020 (The Irish Times, 7 February 2020). It was also reported (The Irish Times, 7 February 2020) in the Irish newspapers in February 2020 that there were at that time about 1,200 electric car (EV) charging points in Ireland, but that this was compared to Norway, the European leader in EV transition, with approximately 12,000 charging stations for circa 300,000 EVs and plug-in hybrid electric vehicles (PHEV).

A compromise in terms of transition and non-electric ban implementation around 2030 maybe for acceptance also of Hybrid cars with smaller conventional petrol engines (regardless of whether the vehicles are 'full' or 'mild' hybrids) of for example at/ less than 1.6-liter (1600 cc) capacity, and/ or say less circa 100 g/km CO_{2} or less in terms of emissions, or a good fuel efficiency rating (L/100 km ) for highway/extra urban and 'combined' journeys.

== Italy ==
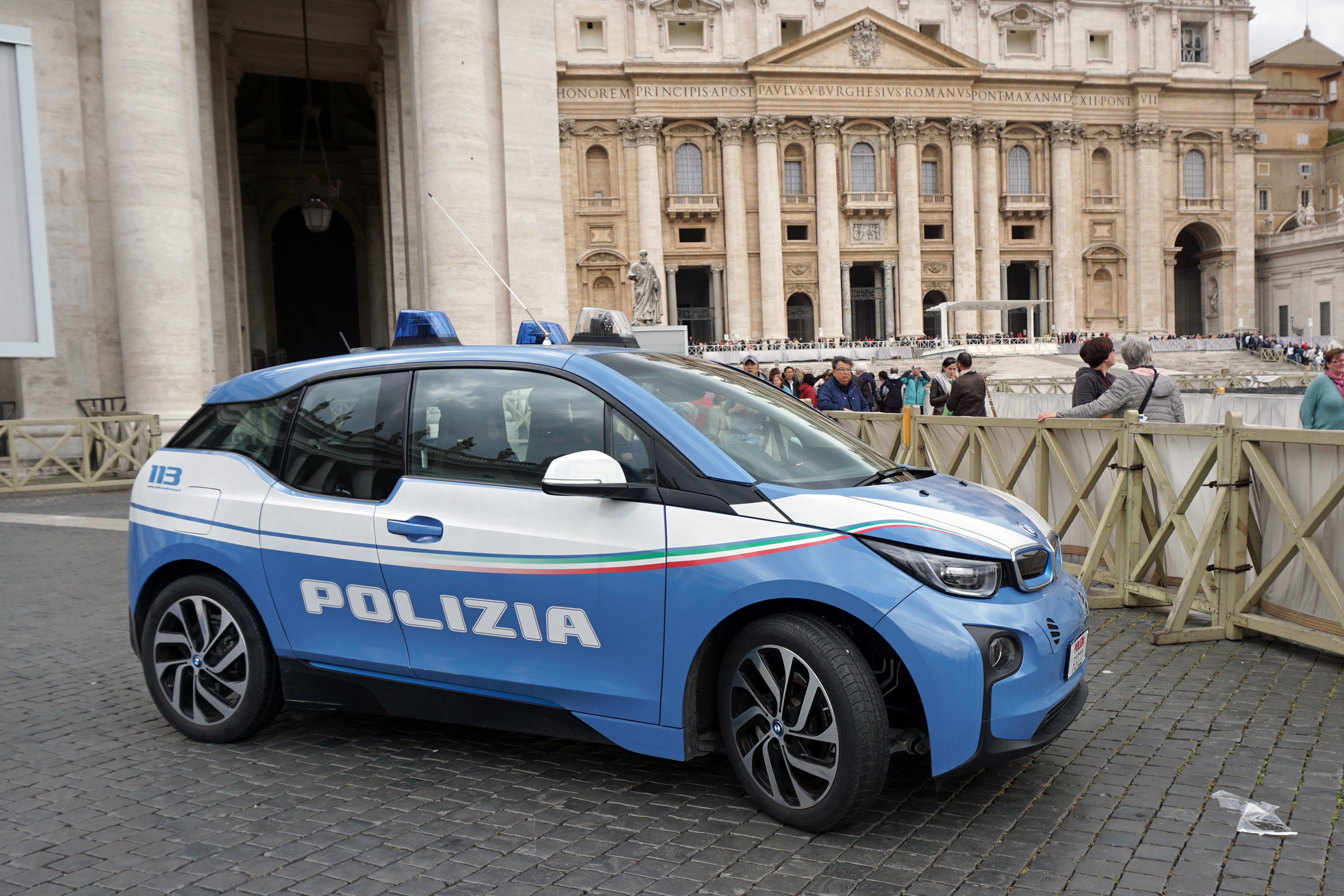
BMW i3 patrol car of the Italian police at Vatican City

In 2025, the electric vehicle market in Italy expanded significantly, in contrast to a 2.1% contraction in the overall national automotive market. Total registrations for rechargeable vehicles (BEVs and PHEVs) reached a combined market share of 12.7% for the year. Battery electric vehicles (BEVs) saw the most robust growth, with 94,973 new registrations—a 46% increase over 2024—accounting for 6.2% of total annual sales. Plug-in hybrids (PHEVs) followed closely with a 6.5% share.

New battery electric vehicle registrations in Italy (including PHEVs)
Year	2017	2018	2019	2020	2021	2022	2023	2024	2025
Total BEV registrations	2,022	4,996	10,566	59,946	67,500	49,536	46,642	64,500	94,973
Market share	0.1%	0.3%	0.5%	2.3%	4.6%	3.7%	4.2%	4.2%	6.2%

This growth was largely propelled by government support through the Ministry of the Environment and Energy Security (MASE), which issued approximately 55,700 purchase vouchers. These incentives led to a year-end surge, with BEVs reaching a monthly record share of 11.0% in December 2025. This shift also contributed to an 11.7% reduction in average CO2 emissions for new registrations during the final month of the year.

Despite these gains, industry bodies such as UNRAE argue that Italy still lags behind the European average in electric mobility. Proponents have called for a "green" overhaul of corporate car taxation, suggesting that a targeted €85 million investment in tax deductibility could stimulate the purchase of an additional 100,000 low-emission vehicles. On the regulatory front, the European Commission's "Automotive Package" of December 2025 adjusted the 2035 emissions target to a 90% reduction, introducing flexibility for electrofuels and biofuels through a carbon-credit system involving "green steel."

== Japan ==
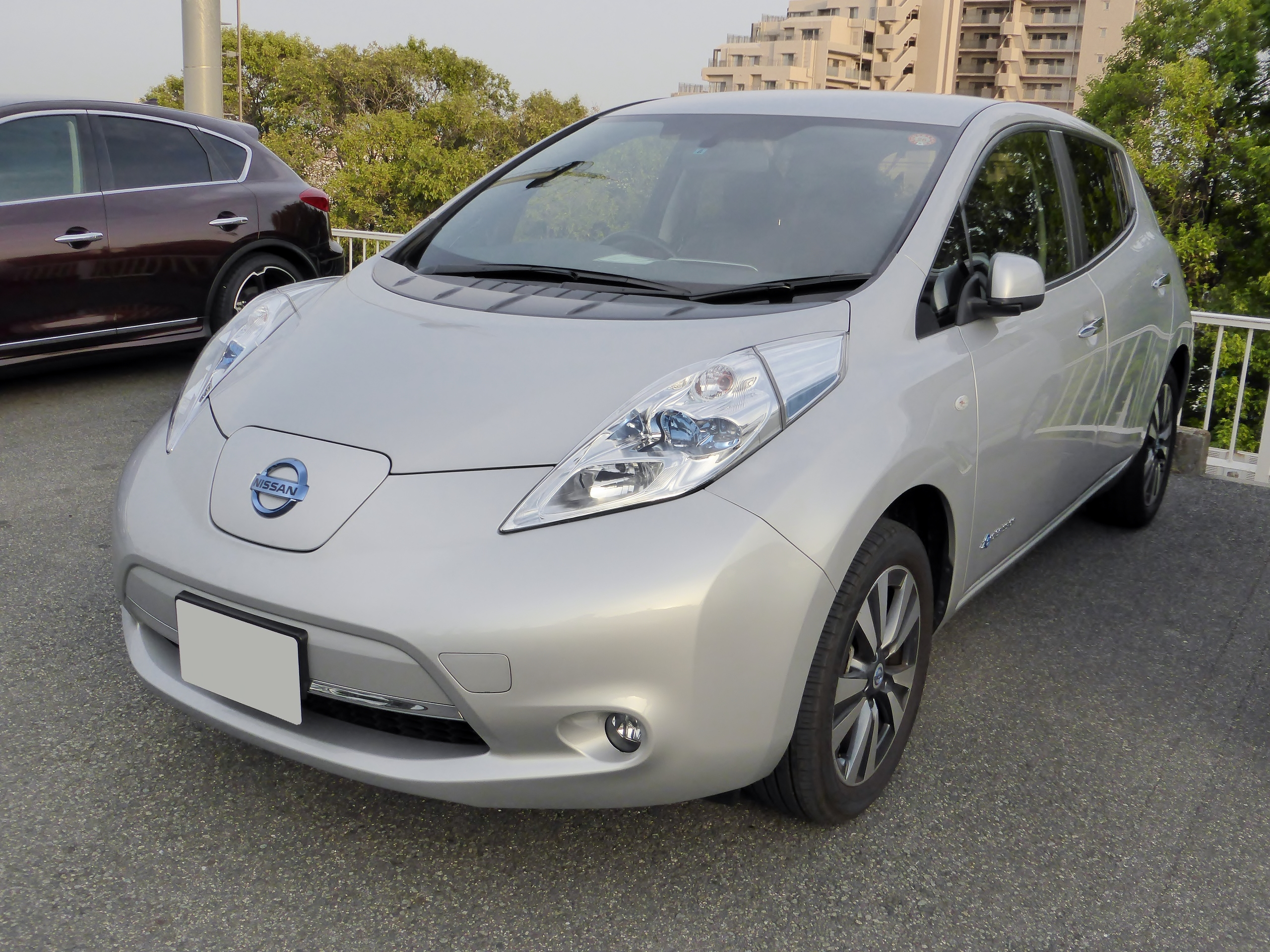
The Nissan Leaf is the top-selling plug-in car in Japan ever, with close to 140,000 units sold by February 2020.

As of December 2020, Japan had a stock of plug-in passenger cars of 293,081 units on the road, consisting of 156,381 all-electric cars and 136,700 plug-in hybrids. The fleet of electric light commercial vehicles in use totaled 9,904 units in 2020.

Sales totaled 24,690 units in 2016, rose to 54,100 in 2017, and then declined to 49,750 in 2018, and fell to 38,900 in 2019. The segment market share declined from 0.68% in 2014 to 0.59% in 2016, and recovered to 1.1% in 2017. The decline in plug-in sales reflects the governmental and domestic carmaker decision to promote hydrogen fuel cell vehicles instead. The market share further fell to 0.7% in 2019 and 0.6% in 2020.

In May 2009, the Japanese Diet passed the "Green Vehicle Purchasing Promotion Measure". The program provided purchasing subsidies for cars, mini and keis, truck,s and buses, including an extra subsidy for purchasesofn a sufficiently old used car. The program ended on 31 March 2010. The Japanese electric vehicle charging infrastructure climbed from 60 public stations in 2010 to 1,381 in 2012.

Mitsubishi introduced multiple plug-in vehicles: the Mitsubishi i MiEV in 2009, the Mitsubishi Minicab MiEV in 2011, a truck version of the Minicab MiEV and the Mitsubishi Outlander P-HEV in 2013. The Nissan Leaf launched in 2010. The Toyota Prius PHEV was released in January 2012.

The Leaf is Japan's all-time bestselling plug-in car, with about 140,000 units delivered by February 2020. Prius PHEV sales since inception totaled about 61,200 units up to December 2018. As of March 2018, the Outlander PHEV had sold 42,451 units. Sales of the Outlander PHEV fell sharply from April 2016 as a result of Mitsubishi's fuel economy scandal.

== Kosovo ==
There has not been much effort by Kosovo to use plug-in electric vehicles. However, ProCredit Bank, Kosova, became the first institution in Kosovo to use electric vehicles, by buying 10 new Mitsubishi i-MiEV vehicles. In 2017, six teens in the city Gjakova, from BONEVET makerspace, became the first European teenager group to build an electric car out of a Renault Twingo, transforming it from a petrol-fueled car to a fully functional electric car.

== Latvia ==
Sales of new battery electric vehicles (BEV) rose from 17 in 2015 to 73 in 2018. In the first quarter of 2019, 46 new BEVs were sold, representing 0.4% of the overall sales.

Total of new battery electric vehicles registered per year
Year	2015	2016	2017	2018	SEM 1 2019
Total new BEV registrations	17	25	22	73	46
% of total new registrations	not available	not available	0.1%	0.4%	0.4%

== Lithuania ==
As of 1 July 2018, 806 EVs were registered. Registrations were led by Nissan (50%). Also, 11,198 hybrids were registered in Lithuania by 1 July 2018. Registrations were led by Toyota (64%).

Sales of new battery electric vehicles (BEV) rose from 37 in 2015 to 143 in 2018. In the first half of 2019, 75 new BEVs were sold, representing 0.3% of overall sales.

Total of new battery electric vehicles registered per year
Year	2015	2016	2017	2018	SEM 1 2019
Total new BEV registrations	37	64	52	143	75
% of total new registrations	not available	not available	0.2%	0.4%	0.3%

== Mexico ==
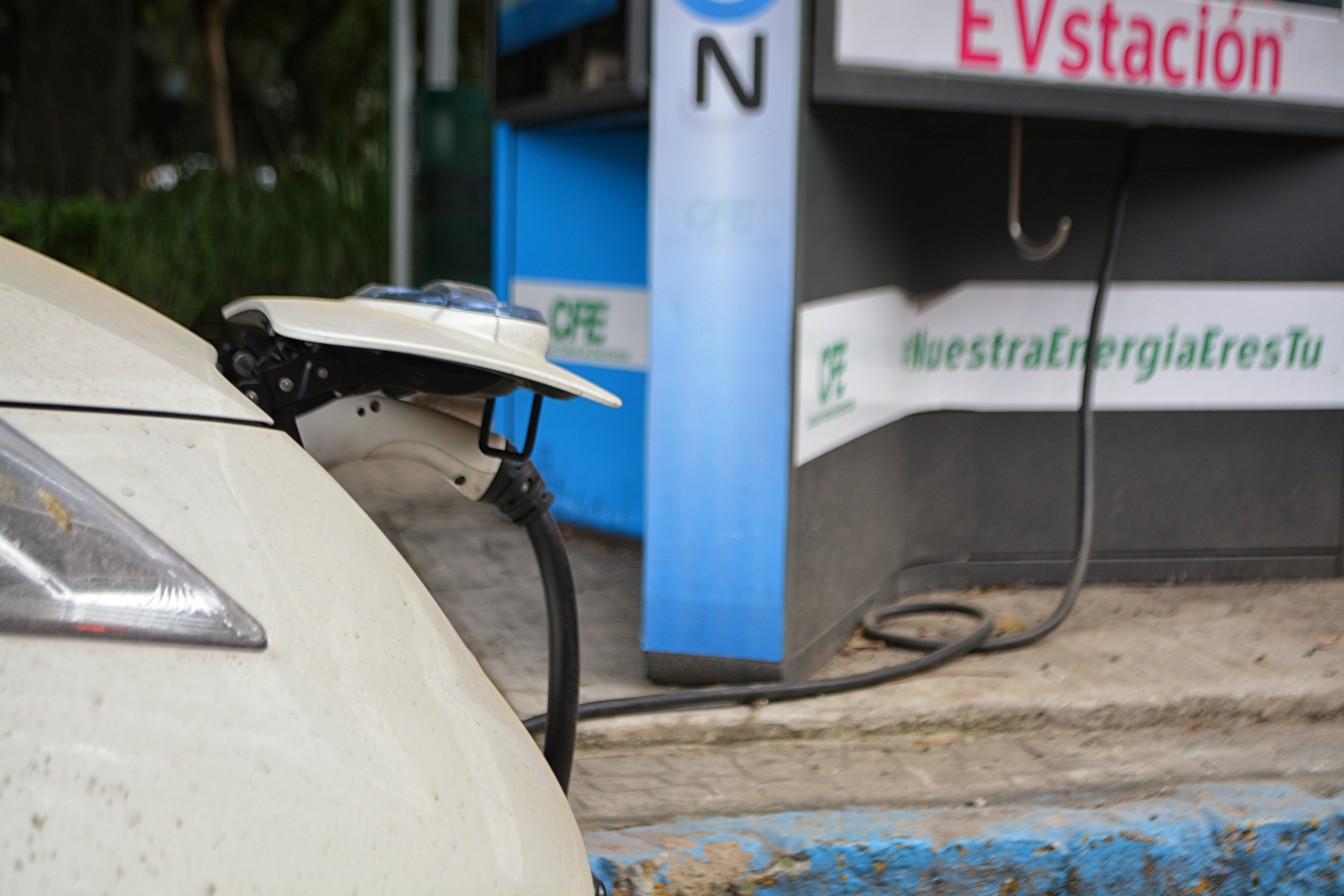
A Nissan Leaf charging at a public charge station in Colonia Condesa, Mexico City

Sales of plug-in electric vehicles in Mexico increased during the first half of the 2020s as additional manufacturers and models entered the market. According to Mexico's Electro Movilidad Asociación (EMA), 53,430 plug-in electric vehicles were sold during the first half of 2026, comprising 22,236 fully electric vehicles, 31,063 plug-in hybrids and 131 range-extended electric vehicles. By the end of June 2026, cumulative sales had reached 126,801 fully electric vehicles, 136,569 plug-in hybrids and 558 range-extended electric vehicles.

At the federal level, battery electric and plug-in hybrid vehicles are exempt from the new-car tax (Impuesto sobre Automóviles Nuevos, ISAN). The federal government has also supported the development of domestically designed electric vehicles through Olinia, a state-backed project announced in 2025 to produce compact electric vehicles in Mexico. Charging infrastructure has expanded but remains concentrated in private locations: at the end of June 2026, EMA recorded 4,655 public charging connectors and 56,279 private connectors, including those installed in homes, dealerships and corporate facilities. Mexico's NOM-163 standard establishes corporate-average carbon dioxide emission limits for new light-duty vehicles through model year 2027. A subsequent phase with stricter standards has been under discussion. Because compliance is assessed across each manufacturer's fleet, its design can influence the mix of vehicles offered in the Mexican market, including the availability of electric models.

== Nepal ==
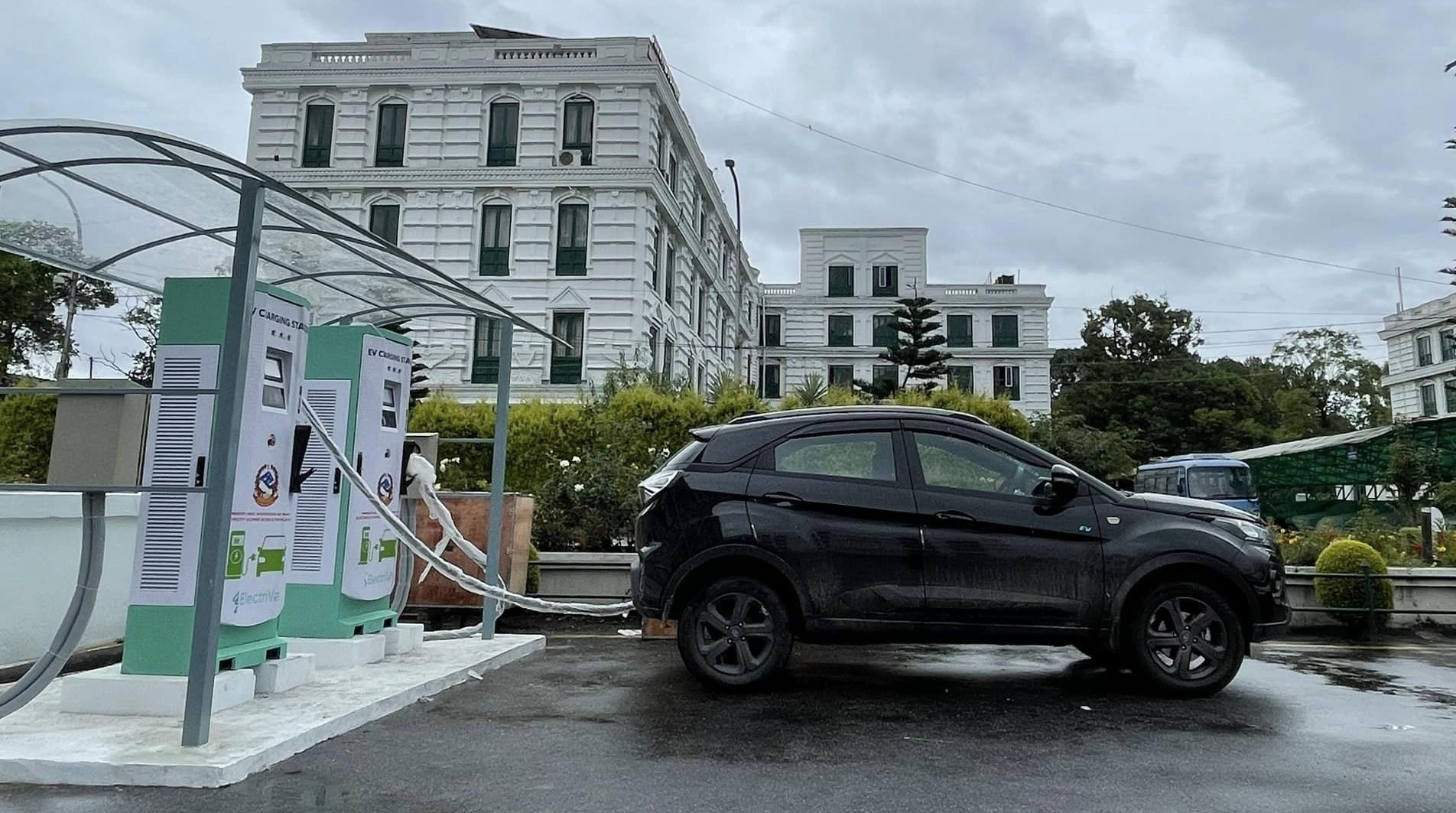
Charging station in government office, Kathmandu.

Nepal has emerged as one of the world's fastest-growing markets for plug-in electric vehicles. Electric vehicles accounted for around 73% of new passenger vehicle sales in Nepal in 2025, making it the second-highest electric vehicle market share globally after Norway. The country has experienced rapid growth in EV adoption due to increasing availability of affordable electric vehicles, government incentives, lower operating costs, and concerns over petroleum import dependency.

Nepal's electricity system is dominated by renewable energy, with hydropower accounting for the majority of domestic electricity generation. This has made electric mobility a strategically attractive alternative to petroleum-based transport. Nepal imports nearly all of its fossil fuels, and electric vehicles help reduce dependence on imported petrol and diesel while utilizing domestically generated electricity.

The government of Nepal has promoted EV adoption through lower customs duties and tax incentives compared with internal combustion engine vehicles. EVs generally have significantly lower ownership and operating costs because electricity prices are relatively stable compared with imported fossil fuels.

Nepal's EV market has grown rapidly in recent years, particularly in passenger cars and public transport. Chinese manufacturers have become major suppliers of electric vehicles in Nepal due to their competitive pricing and availability of smaller urban EV models. Kathmandu Valley and other major urban areas have seen increasing adoption of electric cars, taxis, and buses.

As of 2025, Nepal remains a small EV market in terms of total vehicle numbers compared with major markets such as China, Europe, and the United States, but ranks among global leaders by the proportion of new vehicle sales that are electric.

Factors contributing to Nepal's high EV adoption include:

1. Renewable electricity supply: Nepal's electricity generation is dominated by hydropower, allowing electric vehicles to utilize domestically produced renewable energy and reducing lifecycle emissions compared with fossil fuel vehicles.
2. Reduced dependence on fuel imports: Nepal imports almost all of its petroleum products, making electric mobility an important strategy to reduce dependence on imported fossil fuels and improve energy security.
3. Government policies and incentives: Tax advantages, customs duty reductions, and other government measures have helped make electric vehicles more affordable compared with conventional petrol and diesel vehicles.
4. Lower operating costs: Electric vehicles generally have lower energy and maintenance costs than internal combustion engine vehicles, making them economically attractive for consumers.
5. Expanding charging infrastructure: Growth in public and private charging facilities, along with increasing availability of EV models, has improved the practicality and accessibility of electric vehicles across Nepal.

== Netherlands ==
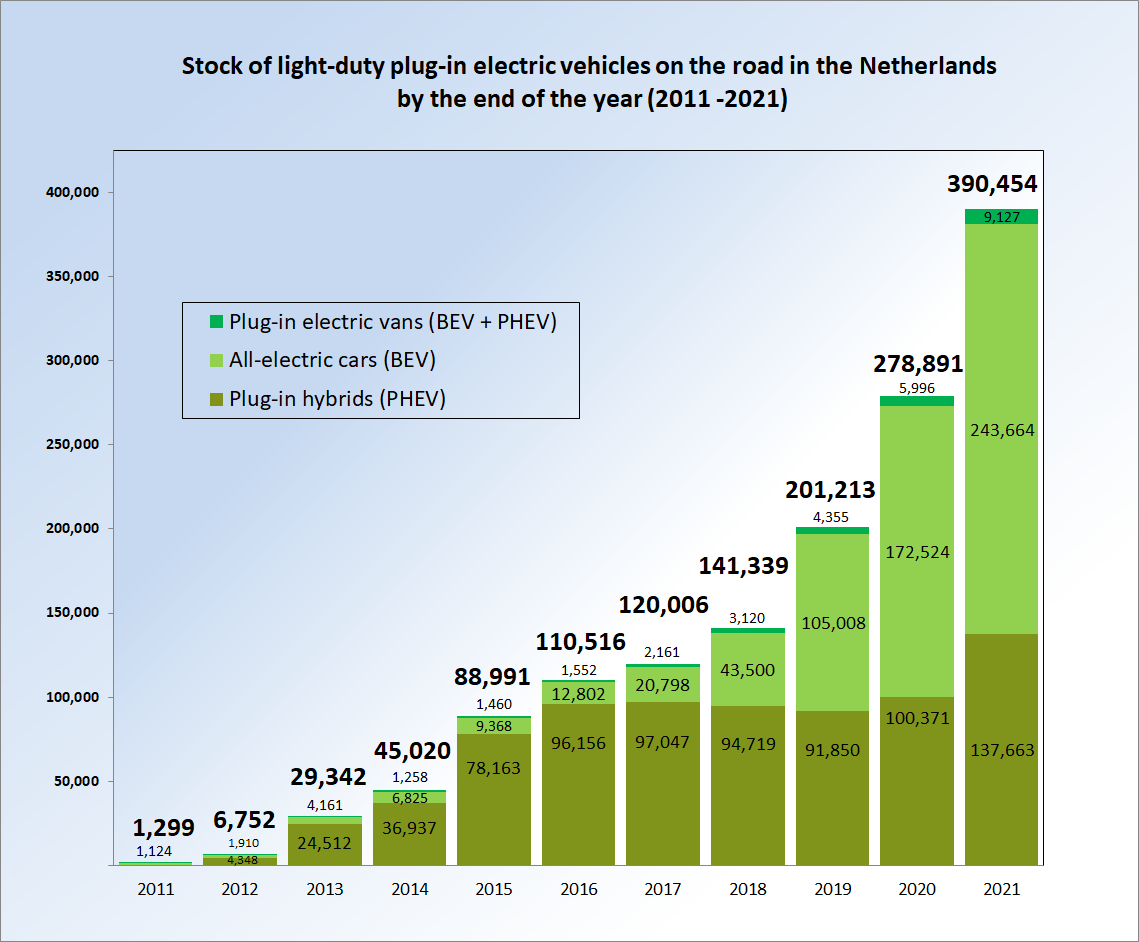
Stock of light-duty plug-in electric vehicles on the road in the Netherlands (2011–2021)

As of 31 December 2021, there were 390,454 highway-legal light-duty plug-in electric vehicles in use in the Netherlands, consisting of 137,663 fully electric cars, 243,664 plug-in hybrid cars, and 9,127 light duty plug-in commercial vehicles. The fleet in circulation of plug-in electric passenger cars represented 4.3% of all passenger cars in Dutch roads at the end of 2021, up from 3.1% in 2020.

The plug-in market share declined from 9.9% in 2015, to 6.7% in 2016, and fell to 2.6% in 2017. After several adjustments in the financial incentives and tax code to favor the purchase of all-electric vehicles, the market share rose to 14.9% in 2019, 24.6% in 2020, and achieved 29.8% in 2021, now with dominance of battery electric vehicle sales since 2019.

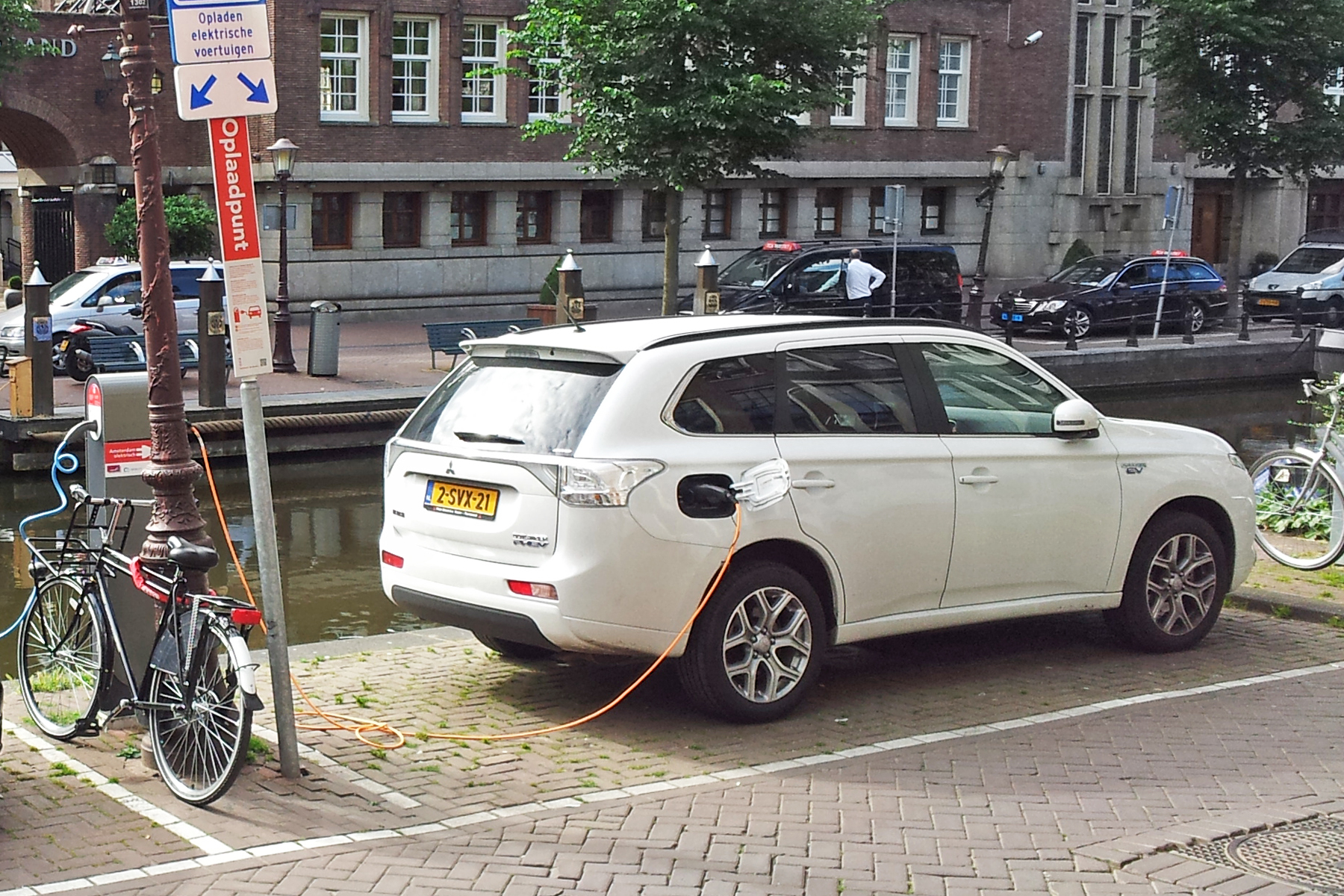
A Mitsubishi Outlander P-HEV in Amsterdam

From 1 January 2016, all-electric vehicles continue to pay a 4% registration fee, but for a plug-in hybrids the fee rises from 7% to 15% if its CO_{2} emissions do not exceed 50 g/km. The rate for a conventional internal combustion car is 25% of its book value.

The Dutch government set a target of 15,000 electric vehicles in 2015, 200,000 in 2020 and 1 million in 2025. The government exempted selected vehicles from registration fee and road taxes. The exemption from the registration tax ended in 2013. Battery electric vehicles have special access to parking spaces in Amsterdam, queues for which can otherwise reach up to 10 years. Free charging is offered in public parking spaces.

Other factors contributing to the rapid adoption of plug-in electric vehicles are the Netherlands' small size, which reduces range anxiety; a long tradition of environmental activism; high gasoline prices (US$8.50 per gallon as of January 2013); and some EV leasing programs that provide free or discounted gasoline-powered vehicles for covering long distances.

== New Zealand ==
Light EV fleet size in New Zealand
Type	2013	2014	2015	2016	2017	2018	2019	2020	2021	2022
New PHEVs	11	224	451	779	1,199	1,939	2,880	3,640	6,114	13,393
New BEVs	100	139	206	581	1,263	2,004	3,861	5,412	12,177	28,099
Used PHEVs	0	2	15	116	456	897	1,544	2,222	3,292	5,219
Used BEVs	54	125	321	1,013	3,227	6,799	10,241	12,608	15,298	18,976
Total EVs	165	490	993	2,489	6,145	11,639	18,526	23,882	36,881	65,687

As of December 2021, about 35,300 light-duty plug-in electric vehicles were registered in New Zealand. The majority of the fleet consists of used imports from Japan and the most popular used model is the Nissan Leaf with 13,900 registered. The country's most popular new EV is the Tesla Model 3 with 3,800 registrations.

The target set in 2016 for New Zealand to have 64,000 electric vehicles in the country by the end of 2021 was not achieved, although by 2020 there were more EVs in New Zealand than Australia, despite Australia having five times the population of New Zealand. The government agency EECA have forecasted 60,000 – 136,000 EVs in the NZ fleet by 2023 and other projections suggest New Zealand will reach 100% electric vehicle sales by 2030.

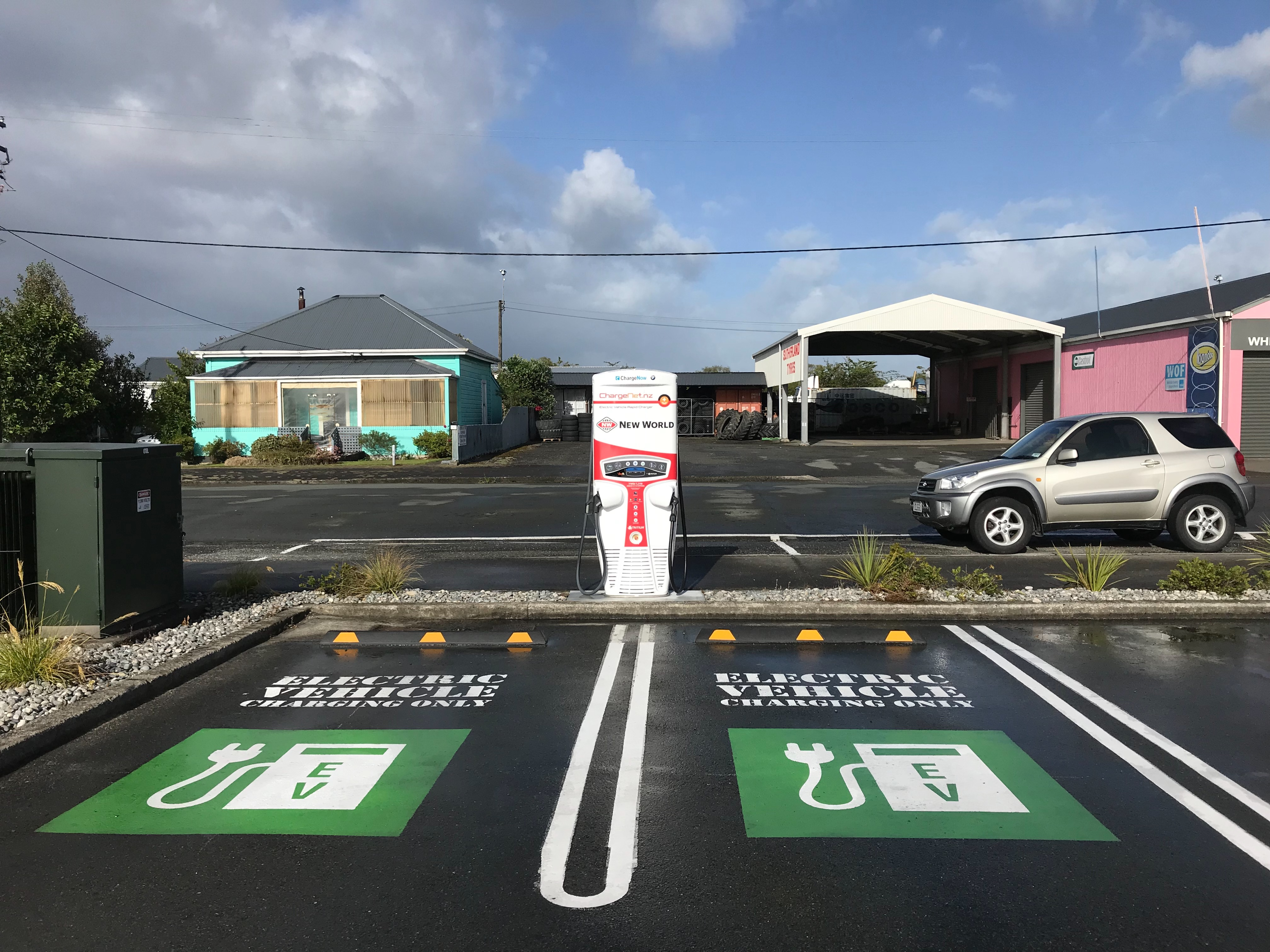
Electric vehicle charger in New Zealand

The New Zealand Government launched an Electric Vehicle Programme in May 2016 to encourage EV uptake and added a Clean Car Discount in June 2021. Electric vehicles in New Zealand are exempt from road user charges until at least 31 March 2024, and attract the Clean Car Discount when first registered in the country. In 2022, New Zealand enacted strict CO_{2} target legislation on vehicle importers for the period 2023–2027, and imposed charges on the purchase of high CO_{2} emission cars, which will accelerate electric vehicle adoption.

== Norway ==
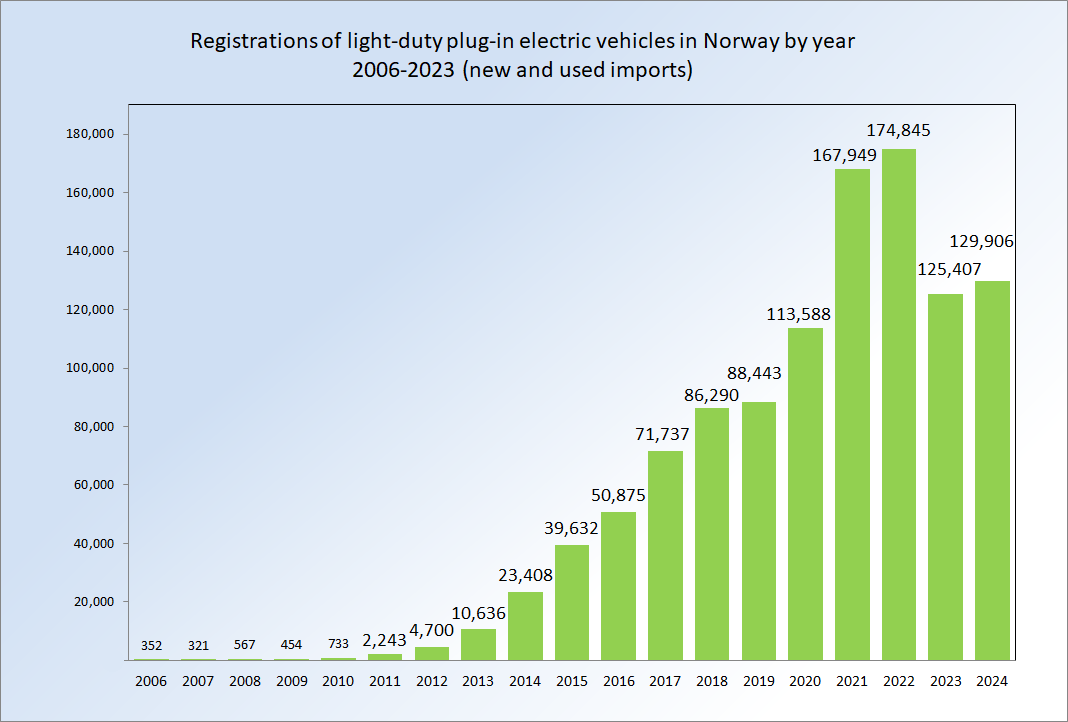
Norwegian registration of light-duty plug-ins by year between 2006 and 2024. Includes PHEVs and BEV cars and vans. Used imports are included.

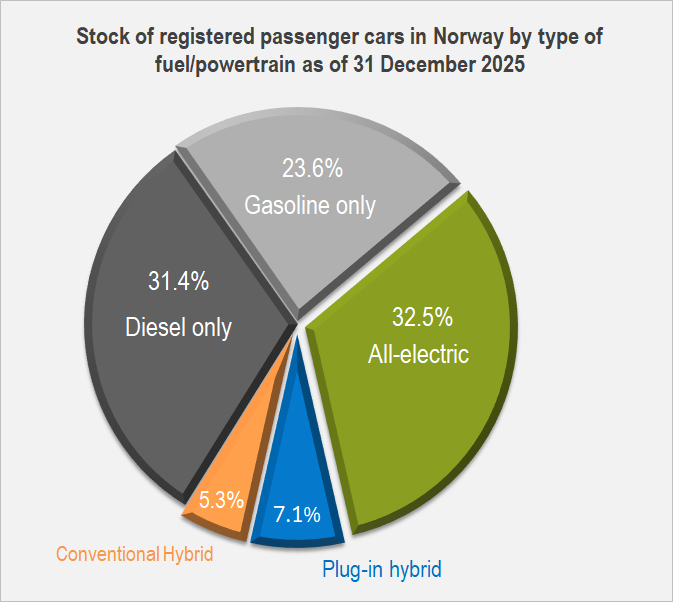
Distribution of the Norwegian stock of passenger cars in use by type of fuel or powertrain at the end of December 2025

As of 31 December 2021, the stock of light-duty plug-in electric vehicles in Norway totaled 647,000 units in use, consisting of 470,309 all-electric passenger cars and vans (including used imports), and 176,691 plug-in hybrids.

Norway's fleet of electric cars is one of the world's cleanest, because 99% of its power comes from hydropower (see also renewable energy in Norway). Norway has the world's largest EV ownership per capita.

The plug-in electric passenger car segment captured a market share of 29.1% in 2016, rose to 39.2% in 2017, 55.9% in 2019, 74.7% in 2020, 86.2% in 2021, and achieved 91.6% in 2024.

In January 2017 the electric-drive segment surpassed combined conventional internal combustion engine sales for the first time ever, achieving a combined market share of 51.4% of new car sales. In October 2018, Norway became the first country where 1 in every 10 passenger cars registered was a plug-in electric vehicle. As of 30 September 2022, plug-in electric cars represented 25% of all passenger cars in circulation in Norway.

The following table shows sales of new battery electric vehicles (BEV) and the segment market share:

Total of new battery electric passenger cars registered per year*
Year	2015	2016	2017	2018	2019	2020	2021	2024
Total new BEV registrations	25,788	24,245	33,080	46,143	60,345	76,804	113,751	114,409
% of total new registrations	17.1%	15.7%	20.9%	31.2%	42.4%	54.3%	64.5%	88.1%

*Note: these figures are for registrations of new zero-emission passenger cars (ZEVs) so it includes a few FCVs

Norway was the first country in the world to have all-electric cars ranking as the best selling passenger car model of the year, and for two consecutive years. First, the Nissan Leaf, with 12,303 units registered in 2018, ended as the country's best selling new passenger car model, marking the first time an electric car tops annual sales of the passenger car segment. Thereafter, the Tesla Model 3 topped annual passenger car sales in 2019 with 15,683 units registered. Also, in March 2019, the Model 3, with over 5,300 units delivered, set the all-time record for monthly sales of a single passenger car model. Another record was set in 2018 and repeated in 2019, as the top 5 best selling passenger car models in both years were all plug-in electric models.

=== Government incentives ===
The Norwegian government set a series of incentives to promote the adoption of zero emission vehicles (ZEVs). Electric vehicles are exempt from all non-recurring vehicle fees, making electric cars price competitive with conventional cars. BEVs have lower public parking fees and toll payments (including domestic ferries), as well as given access to bus lanes. Plug-in hybrids have a smaller market share than ZEVs because they are not eligible for the same incentives. In 2013 the government reduced taxes for to improve PHEV sales.

The initial 50,000 vehicle target was reached on 20 April 2015 at a cost of up to 4 billion krone (around US$640 million). The Government decided to continue the incentives through 2017, although the Parliament phased out some of the incentives. As of January 2018, 24 out of 58 major municipalities kept the free parking for EVs. Among the 34 municipalities that terminated the benefit, six kept different variants of partial free parking.

In 2016, the government proposed its National Transport Plan 2018–2029 (NTP) with the goal that all new cars, buses and light commercial vehicles in 2025 should be zero emission vehicles. By 2030, heavy-duty vans, 75% of new long-distance buses, and 50% of new trucks must be zero emission vehicles.

== Pakistan ==
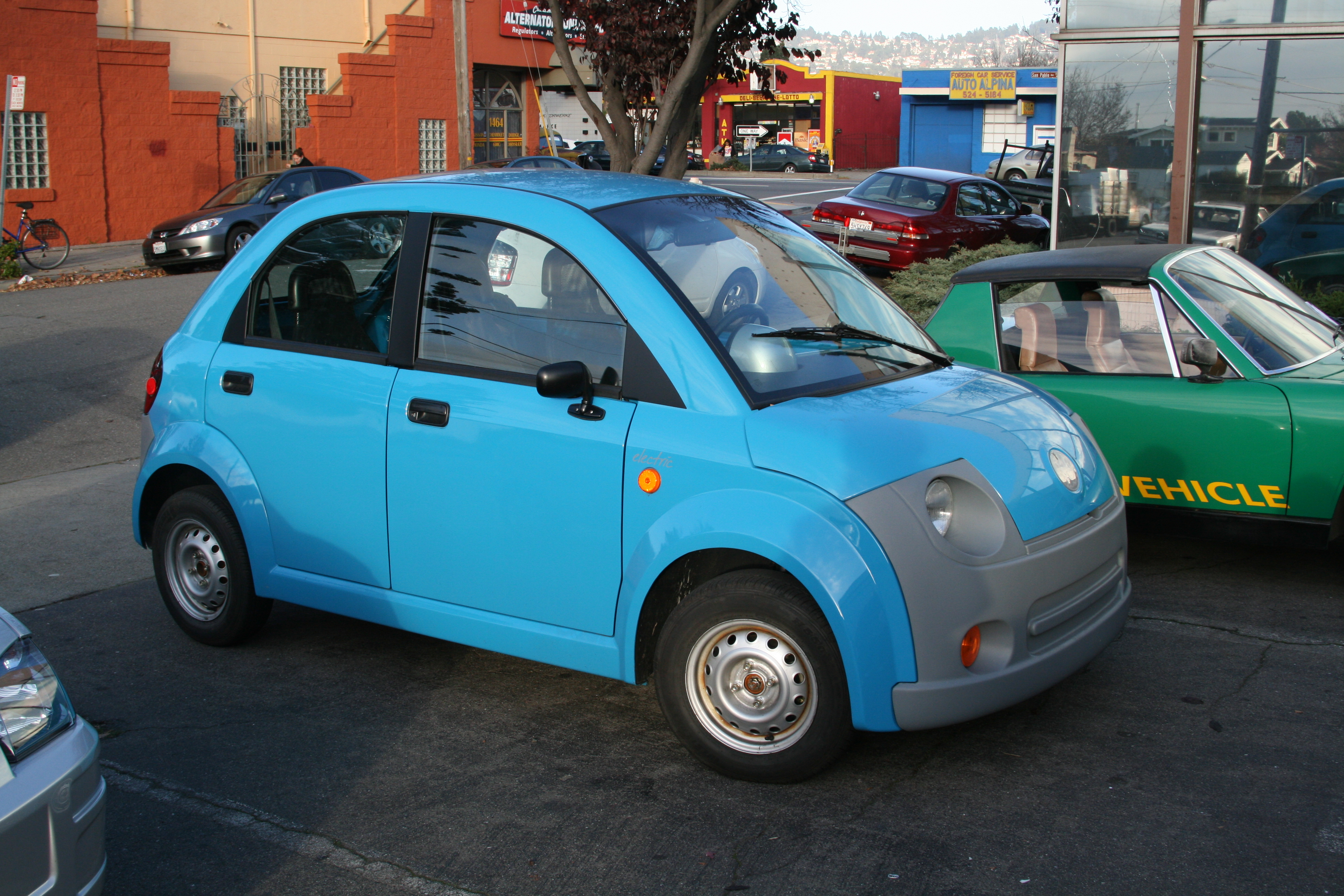
Dynasty IT was bought by Karakoram Motors of Pakistan, and now it is manufactured in Pakistan.

Pakistan already has a significant market for hybrid vehicles with the Honda Vezel, Toyota Prius, Toyota Aqua, and other models seen on the roads. The Automotive Development Policy (2016–2021) and the launch of China-Pakistan Economic Corridor (CPEC) are encouraging foreign investments for the new automobile brands to enter Pakistani market, while the leading manufacturers in the automobile industry in Pakistan are now introducing EV models with a wide range of prices which target consumers of diverse income groups.

In January 2017, Dewan Motors with BMW inaugurated Pakistan's first public charging station for electric and plug-in hybrid electric vehicles in Emporium Mall, Lahore. Dewan Motors had installed another station for plug-in hybrid and electric vehicles at Dolmen Mall in Karachi in February 2017. Rahmat Group has acquired 25 acres of land to establish Electrical Complex at Nooriabad to produce electric vehicles. At the initial stage, the group will produce electric buses to tap the transport market, and in the second phase, a manufacturing plant would be established at the complex to produce electric cars and two-wheelers.

In 2017, Jolta International had created the first locally manufactured electric motorcycle. The company is based just outside of Bahria Town Rawalpindi, and showcased three Jolta Chargeable Electrical Motorcycles in Gwadar.

Leading automobile manufacturers, including Super Power Motorcycles, have started introducing EV models. Neon, a Pakistan-based motorcycle assembler, has introduced an all-electric Neon M3 motorbike in Pakistan. The sports bike comes with emission free and noiseless features. Neon also assembles Electric scooters in Pakistan.

== Philippines ==
The country's first electric car was launched at Silliman University by Insular Technologies in August 2007. In some major cities such as Makati, electric Jeepneys (e-jeepneys) are used as well as electric tricycles (e-tricycles). The Philippine Public Utility Modernization Program (PUVMP) aims to employ around 100,000 e-tricycles annually and 200,000 e-jeepney in the next six years.

The Eagle G-Car is a Philippine BEV car (at a cost as low as $3,000-$6,000). E-Jeepneys were a venture of Renewable Independent Power Producer Inc., which sprang from Greenpeace and other groups, and Solarco, which in turn is a part of GRIPP.

During a demonstration at Nanyang Technological University on 7 February 2018, Nissan Philippines' president and managing director Ramesh Narasimhan has announced that they would like to bring the Leaf to the Filipino market.

== Poland ==
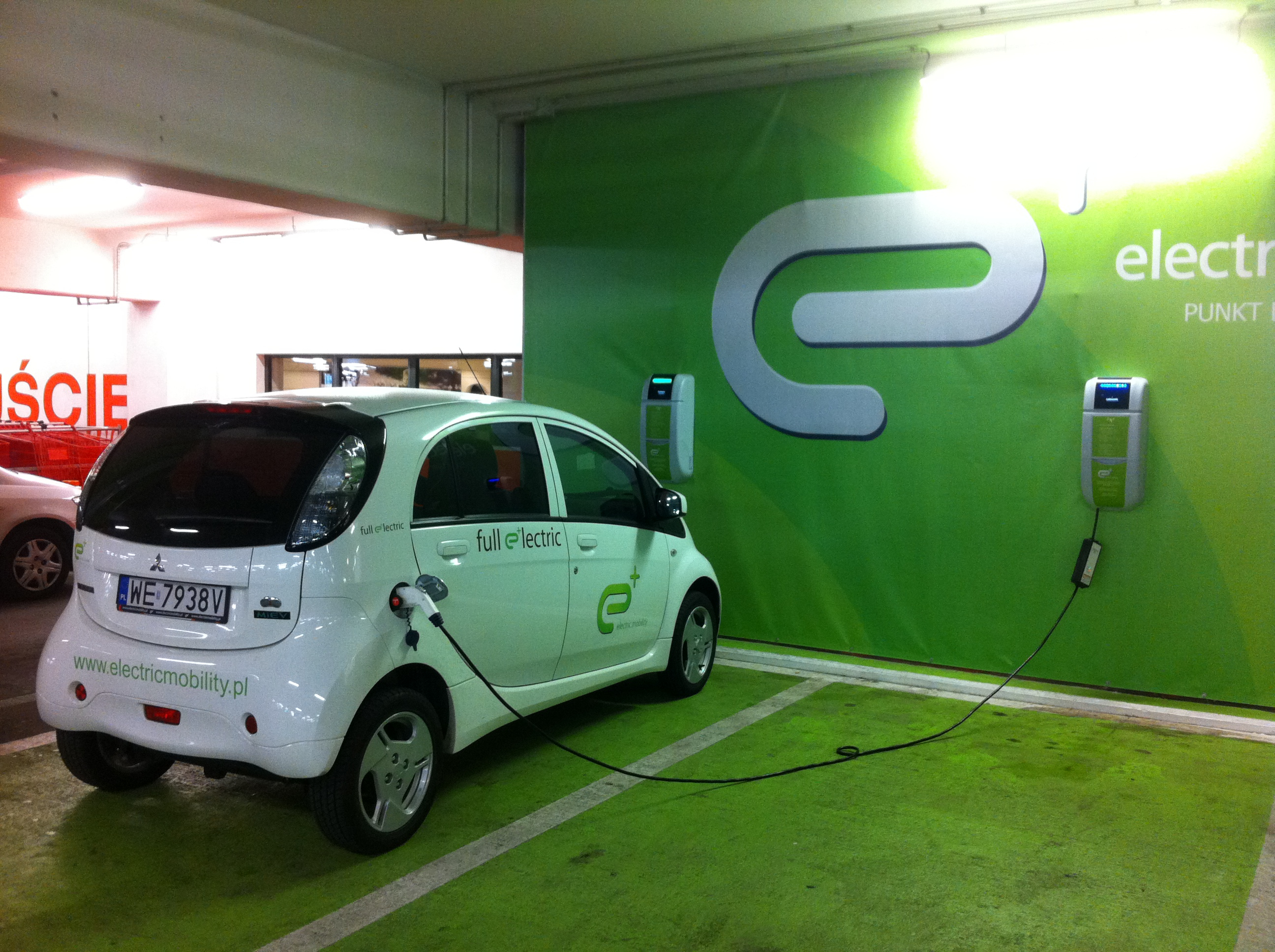
A Mitsubishi i-MiEV charging at a charging station

In 2009, Poland began developing charging station infrastructure in Gdańsk, Katowice, Kraków, Mielec and Warsaw with EU funds. In November 2017 an electric car sharing network opened in Wrocław. The fleet is based on 2013 model of Nissan Leaf.

The biggest organization in Poland in the area of electric vehicles is Klaster Green Stream. The Polish company 3xE – samochody elektryczne (3xE – electric cars) offer electric vehicle conversions of small city cars such as the Smart ForTwo, Citroën C1, Fiat Panda, Peugeot 107, Audi A2. The converted cars have a range of about 100 km (60 mi), using lithium iron phosphate (LiFePO_{4}) batteries and brushless DC electric motors.

Sales of new battery electric vehicles (BEV) rose from 70 in 2015 to 620 in 2018. At the first half of 2019, 947 new BEV were sold, representing 0.3% of the overall sales.

Total of new battery electric vehicles registered per year
Year	2015	2016	2017	2018	SEM 1 2019
Total new BEV registrations	70	112	435	620	947
% of total new registrations	not available	not available	0.09%	0.12%	0.30%

== Portugal ==
As of December 2019, there were 29,700 plug-in passenger cars in use in Portugal. Of these, 15,980 were fully electric cars and 13,720 were plug-in hybrids. The market share rose from 0.8% in 2016 to 3.7% in 2018, and achieved 5.7% in 2019.

In 2015, the stock of EVs was about 2,000, consisting of 1,280 BEV cars and 720 PHEVs. EV sales totaled 1,305 units in 2015, up 260% from 2014. The top selling model was the Mitsubishi Outlander P-HEV (229). Sales of new battery electric vehicles (BEV) rose from 645 in 2015 to 4073 in 2018. At the first half of 2019, 3905 new BEV were sold, representing 3.0% of the overall sales.

Total of new battery electric vehicles registered per year
Year	2015	2016	2017	2018	1 Half 2019
Total new BEV registrations	645	764	1640	4073	3905
% of total new registrations	not available	not available	0.7%	1.8%	3.0%

In 2009, Portugal worked with Renault and Nissan to create a national charging network.

In 2010, the government offered purchase incentives for the first 5,000 EVs and a separate scrappage incentive. EVs were exempted from the vehicle registration tax. These incentives were discontinued at the end of 2011.

== Romania ==
Light EV fleet size in Romania
Year	2014	2015	2016	2017	2018	2019	2020	2021	2022	2023	2024	2025
BEV	236	496	1,183	2,758	4,572	6,678	8,900	9,215	15,441	20,812	16,155	18,912
PHEV	236	496	1,183	2,758	4,572	6,678	8,900	9,387	12,279	14,085	21,178	30,567
Total EV (only cars)	236	496	1,183	2,758	4,572	6,678	8,900	18,602	27,720	34,897	37,333	49,479
% new registrations	0.28	0.50	1.03	2.11	2.89	4.18	7.12	15.53	21.67	24.44	25.07	31.75

Sales of new battery electric vehicles (BEV) rose from 24 in 2015 to 605 in 2018. At the first half of 2019, 456 new BEV were sold, representing 0.6% of the overall sales.

As of June 2019, over 3,000 EVs were registered. Registrations were led by the Renault Zoe. The government offered purchase incentives of 4200 euro (20000 RON) for a PHEV and 8400 euro (40000 RON) for BEV, although yearly capped (but not reached) and limited in time due to a yearly approval.

== Russia ==
As of July 2022, 18.7 thousand EVs were registered.

The local governments try to increase the usage of electrocars (e.g. by removing taxes)

== Serbia ==
As of September 2019, 148 EVs were registered. Serbia has a network of over 30 charging stations (including 5 that are solar powered & 2 Tesla Super Chargers) with more planned for construction. In 2020, Serbia introduced new purchase & tax incentives for EVs & Hybrids offering up to 5000 euros to help accelerate electrification. Serbia is also home to about 10% of global Lithium reserves, the mining & processing of which will be done in partnership with Rio Tinto who have committed $1.5 billion of investment in the country. The government is currently looking to use this resource to produce a major EV battery plant & Rio Tinto is helping locate a strategic partner for this venture.

== Singapore ==
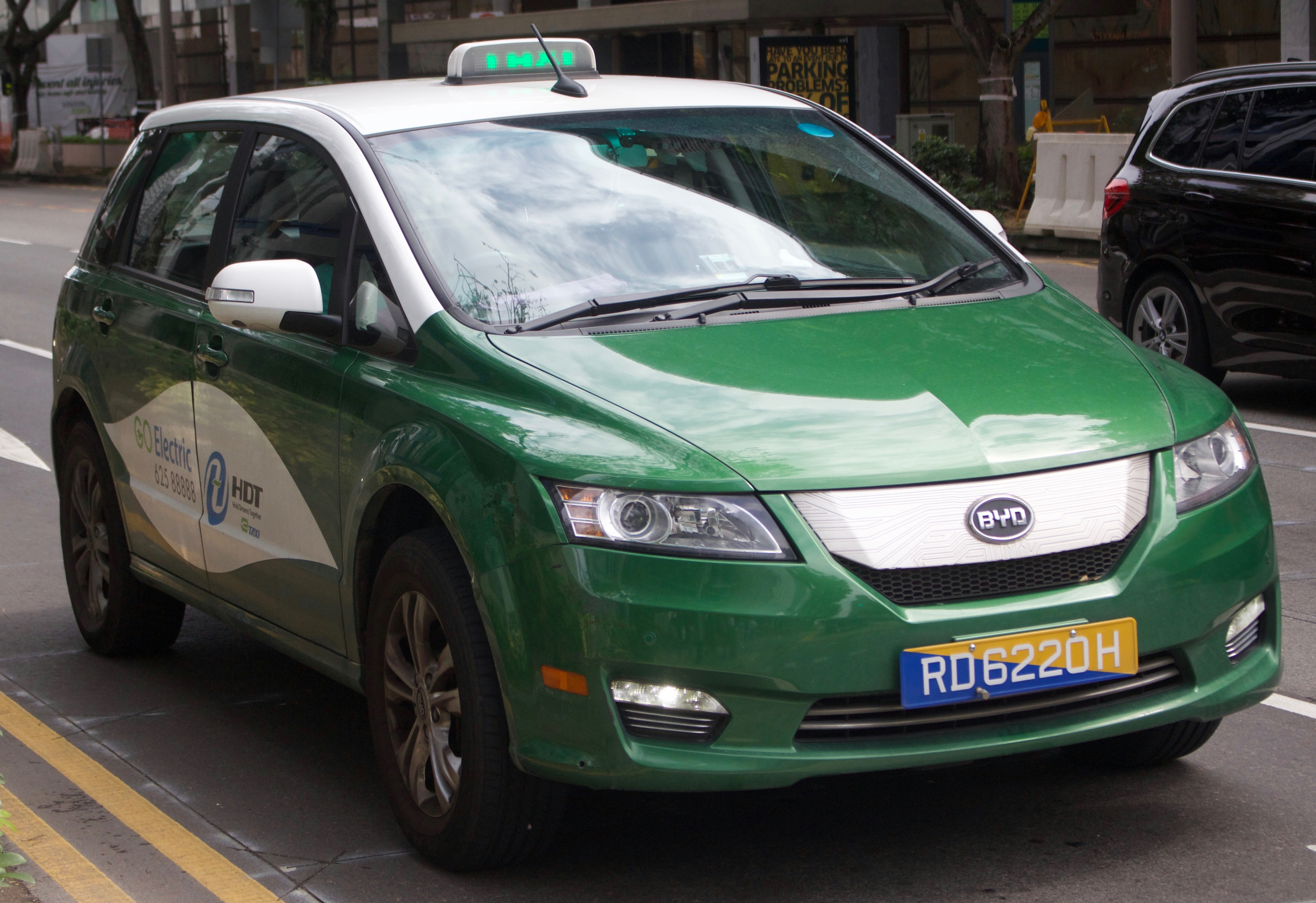
BYD e6 electric taxi in Singapore

As of January 2021, there were 1,274 electric cars in Singapore, out of a total car population of 636,483 units (0.2%). Adoption has been slowed due to high purchase prices, lack of public charging infrastructure and unclear national policies. As of October 2016, 74 public charging stations were operating.

Until 2020, the government offered purchase incentives, although the country's taxation scheme made EVs more expensive than a conventional car. Electric cars faced a carbon surcharge and a scrap rebate, along with the annual road tax. In February 2021, the government announced the Singapore Green Plan 2030, which set the goals of deploying 60,000 charging points by 2030, new monetary purchase incentives, and for all new car registrations to be cleaner-energy models by the same year.

As of October 2016, there were 129 electric cars registered, with the BMW i3 and i8 range being the highest selling brand. In February 2017, Singapore had the largest fleet of electric taxis in Southeast Asia, with 100 vehicles from BYD. By December 2018, there were 466 fully electric cars registered in Singapore, 0.08% of the total car stock, and 357 plug-in hybrids, 0.06%.

== Slovakia ==
Sales of new battery electric vehicles (BEV) rose from 52 in 2015 to 309 in 2018. At the first half of 2019, 95 new BEV were sold, representing 0.2% of the overall sales.

Total of new battery electric vehicles registered per year
Year	2015	2016	2017	2018	SEM 1 2019
Total new BEV registrations	52	59	229	309	95
% of total new registrations	not available	not available	0.2%	0.3%	0.2%

== Slovenia ==
Sales of new battery electric vehicles (BEV) rose from 288 in 2017 to 467 in 2018. At the first half of 2019, 264 new BEV were sold, representing 0.7% of the overall sales. In 2021 1689 electric cars have been sold, which represents 3.2% of the overall market share.

Total of new battery electric vehicles registered per year
Year	2017	2018	SEM 1 2019	2021
Total new BEV registrations	288	467	264	1689
% of total new registrations	0.4%	0.6%	0.7%	3.2%

== South Africa ==
Both hybrids and full battery-electric vehicles have grown from a negligible base in South Africa, driven by a widening range of locally available models, particularly from Chinese manufacturers, and by rising fuel prices, even as the market remains small by global standards and public charging infrastructure lags demand.

Naamsa's New Energy Vehicle (NEV) breakdown showed 3,045 NEVs sold in June 2026, more than double the 1,491 sold in June 2025: 1,488 traditional hybrids, 990 plug-in hybrids and 419 battery-electric vehicles, together accounting for 6% of the light-vehicle market. Between January and June 2026 NEV sales totalled 13,193 units (4.1% of the total new vehicle market), comprising 6,667 hybrids, 4,623 plug-in hybrids and 1,903 battery-electric vehicles, with hybrids and plug-in hybrids continuing to substantially outsell fully electric vehicles. Online marketplace AutoTrader recorded a 220% increase in searches for electrified vehicles between March 2025 and March 2026, which industry figures have attributed largely to fuel prices. Overall new-vehicle sales reached 57,708 units in July 2026, up 11.9% year-on-year.

South Africa's public charging network remains concentrated in Johannesburg, Pretoria and Cape Town and is largely privately owned and operated, with GridCars accounting for roughly 60% of public charging capacity as of mid-2026.

The South African government set out ten proposed actions to grow domestic EV production and adoption, including research and development tax incentives, reduced import duties on batteries used in locally produced vehicles, expanded public charging infrastructure spending, and consumer purchase incentives.

== South Korea ==
Registration of highway-capable plug-in cars by model in South Korea between 2012 and 2013
Model	Total Sales 2012–2013	Sales 2013	Sales 2012
Kia Ray EV	929	398	531
Samsung SM3 Z.E.	294	277	17
Chevrolet Spark EV	40	40	
Total registrations	1,263	715	548

As of December 2020, South Korea had 92,400 plug-in passenger cars in circulation, of which, 84,070 were fully electric cars (91%). At the end of 2019, the country had 9,187 public slow and fast chargers.

As of 2014, all electric models on sale were manufactured by local firms. The top selling models during 2015 were the Kia Soul EV (657) and the Samsung SM3 Z.E. (640). The Hyundai Ioniq Electric was released in July 2016.

The government offers a purchase subsidy for electric cars. Starting in 2016, the EV purchase tax surcharge was reduced, although EV drivers see various fees.

As of October 2016, about 7,200 plug-in cars had been sold. 2,896 EVs were sold during the first ten months of 2016, up 12% year-on-year. By 2018 there were a total of 59,600 electric cars on Korean streets. Nearly 34,000 electric vehicles have been sold in 2018 in Korea. The market share of battery-electric and plugin-electric vehicles in Korea was 2.21%.

== Spain ==
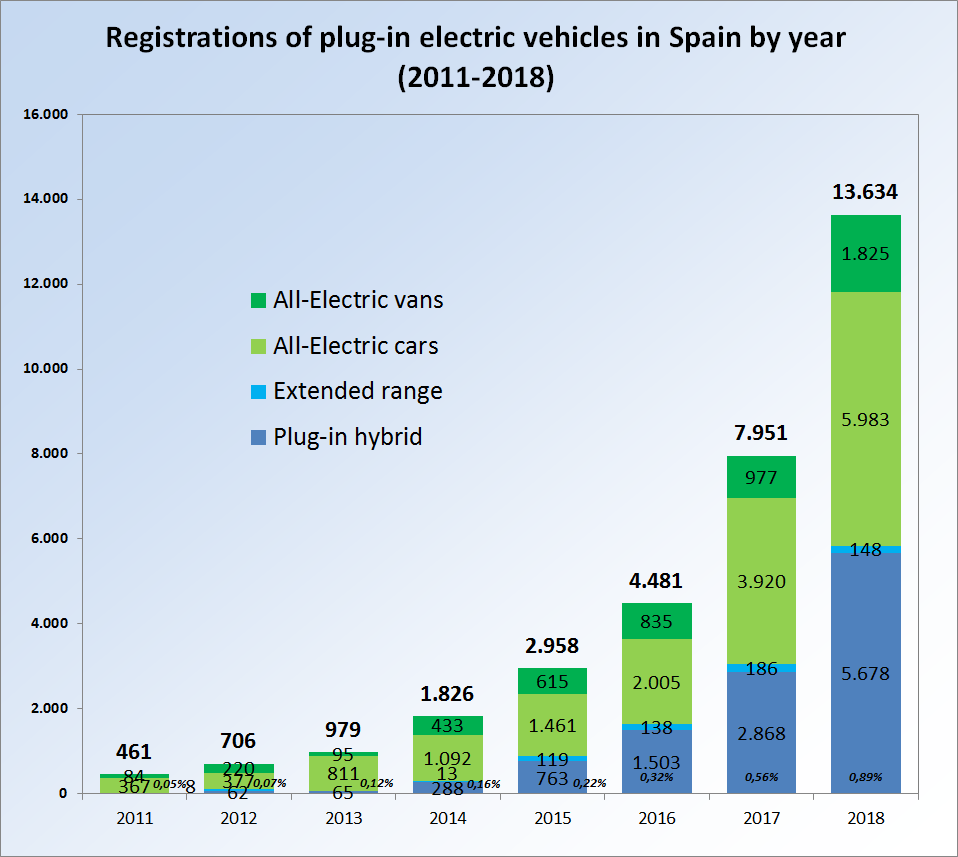
EV registrations in Spain by year between 2010 and 2017

The stock of plug-in cars reached almost 6,000 plug-in as of 2015, consisting of 4,460 BEV cars and 1,490 PHEVs. The top selling model in 2015 was the Mitsubishi Outlander P-HEV (389).

3,129 EVs were sold in Spain during the first three-quarters of 2016. Sales continued to grow at an accelerated pace, up 79% from the same period in 2015.

Sales of new battery electric vehicles (BEV) rose from 1342 in 2015 to 5984 in 2018. At the first half of 2019, 5452 new BEV were sold, representing 0.8% of the overall sales. For the whole 2019, the sales came to 1.4% of all new registrations.

Total of new battery electric vehicles registered per year
Year	2015	2016	2017	2018	SEM 1 2019
Total new BEV registrations	1342	2005	3920	5984	5452
% of total new registrations	not available	not available	0.3%	0.5%	0.8%

In 2011 the national government initiated EV purchase incentives. Aragón, Asturias, Baleares, Madrid, Navarra, Valencia, Castilla-La Mancha, Murcia, Castile and León offered additional incentives.

== Sri Lanka ==
As of September 2015, 2,072 electric cars had been registered, led by the Nissan Leaf. EV sales experienced a record month in September 2015 with 471 units registered, up from only 15 in September 2014. Sales of the Nissan Leaf began in 2013.

In 2025 5% of Sri Lanka’s brand new vehicle registrations were EVs.

== Sweden ==
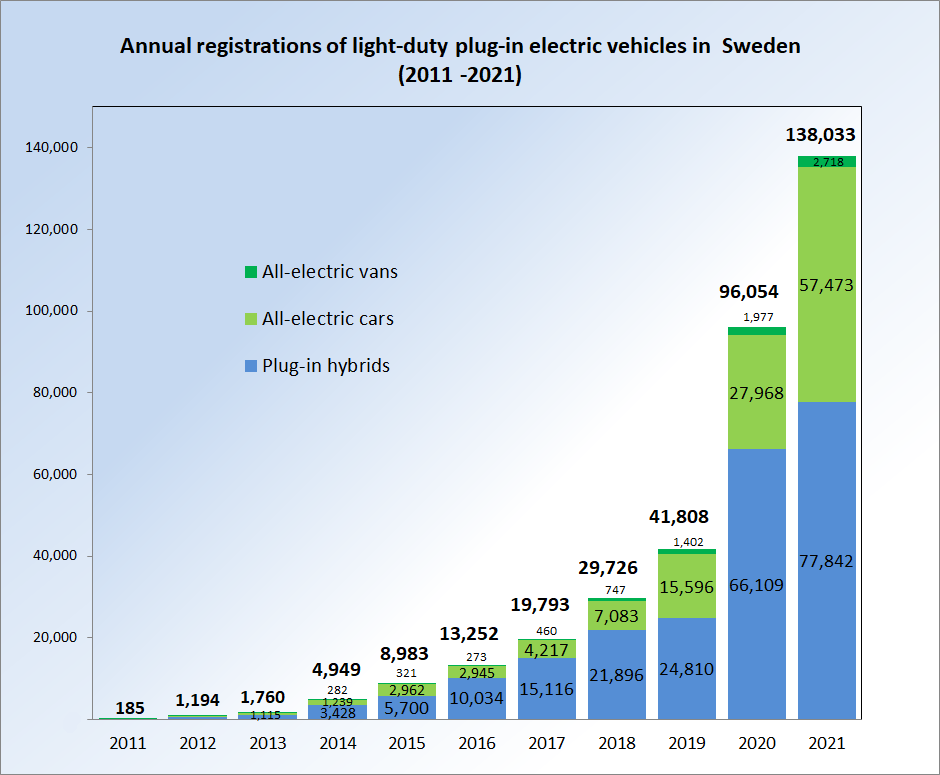
EV registrations in Sweden by year between 2011 and 2021

As of December 2021, a total of 355,737 light-duty plug-in electric vehicles have been registered since 2011, consisting of 226,731 plug-in hybrids, 120,343 all-electric cars and 8,663 all-electric utility vans.

The Swedish market is dominated by plug-in hybrids, representing 74.9% of plug-in car registrations through 2017, but began to decline thereafter, reaching 70.3% in 2020, and 57.5% in 2021. Passenger plug-ins increased their market share from 3.5% in 2016 to 5.2% in 2017, rose to 11.3% in 2019, to 32.2% in 2020, and achieved a record take rate of 45.0% in 2021.

As of December 2017, the Outlander PHEV continues to rank as the all-time top selling plug-in electric car with 9,957 units registered. As of December 2016, the Renault Kangoo Z.E. continued as the all-time the leader in the commercial utility EV segment with 1,024 units.

Effective January 2012 Sweden offered subsidies for the purchase and operation of 5,000 electric cars and other "super green cars" with low/no carbon emissions. The program was belatedly renewed through 2015 and again for 2016 with the addition of subsidies for electric buses.

== Switzerland ==
Top 10 electric vehicles in Switzerland, January to May 2019
	Model	Units
1	Tesla Model 3	1991
2	Renault Zoe	646
3	BMW i3	394
4	Jaguar I-Pace	247
5	Nissan Leaf	219
6	Tesla Model S	189
7	Audi e-tron	174
8	Tesla Model X	150
9	Hyundai Ioniq	98
10	Mitsubishi i-MiEV	31

As of April 2016, over 12,000 EVs had been registered since 2012.

Sales of new battery electric vehicles (BEV) rose from 3257 in 2015 to 5139 in 2018. At the first half of 2019, 5938 new BEV were sold, representing 3.8% of the overall sales.

Total of new battery electric vehicles registered per year
Year	2015	2016	2017	2018	SEM 1 2019
Total new BEV registrations	3257	3295	4775	5139	5938
% of total new registrations	not available	not available	1.5%	1.7%	3.8%

Deliveries of the Mitsubishi i MiEV. the Nissan Leaf were launched in 2011.

The government offers no subsidies or incentives for purchasing EVs. Cantons can propose special discounts on annual taxes depending on the car's efficiency label and range from 100% rebate (e.g. Solothurn) to 0%.

== Taiwan ==
Taiwan has a plan to ban all non-electric vehicles in the coming decades, due to concerns over air quality. The plan calls for all new government vehicles and public buses to be electric by 2030, ban sales of nonelectric motorcycles by 2035, and ban sales of nonelectric four-wheel vehicles by 2040.

In 2014 a local taxi association purchased over 1,500 BYD electric minivans.

== Turkey ==
About 1.33 million passenger cars in Turkey were either fully electric or hybrid by the end of July 2026. In January–May 2026, 18.4% of newly registered passenger cars were fully electric. Including hybrids, 51.6% were either electric or hybrid.

== Ukraine ==
In November 2018 EV imports were almost 250% those of November 2017.

The Ukrainian Government passed a 2019 budget law which extended existing 2018 tax privileges for plug-in cars until 2023. Both new and second hand plug-in BEVs (without gasoline range extenders) may be imported free of VAT, import duty and excise duty. As a consequence of the law, new cars like for example the Tesla Model 3 can be purchased for a lower price than in any other country in Europe. This has stimulated demand in 2018 and the trend will most likely continue through 2019.

As of 1 January 2019, a total of 19,884 plug-in cars and conventional hybrids are registered in Ukraine, consisting of 10,714 plug-ins and 9,170 hybrids. Over the year 2018, the number of electric vehicles increased by 73% (5,557 cars). The EV market share of total new and used cars first registered during 2018 was 2.8% based on 5,557 out of a total of 198,600 first registered cars.

7,542 vehicles were registered in this country over 2019. The market of commercial electric vehicles grew even more – by one and a half times. The most popular electric vehicle in Ukraine is Nissan Leaf. Last year, 3,217 vehicles of this particular model joined the car pool in this country. Tesla Model S comes second, with 623 car owners in Ukraine. Third place belongs to Volkswagen e-Golf, with 360 Ukrainians making their choice in its favor.

As of 1 August 2020, 46,000 green cars were registered in Ukraine. Of these, 23,000 were fully electric vehicles.

As of 1 June 2021, it is registered in Ukraine 64 459 green cars. 28 865 were fully electric vehicle and 35 594 hybrids. This is more than in all neighboring to Ukraine countries combined. It can be concluded that Ukraine is the leader of electric car mobility in the region of Eastern Europe.

As of June 2022, there are 36,602 fully electric cars registered in Ukraine

As of 1 October 2022 there were registered 42,289 fully electric cars in Ukraine.

As of 31 December 2024 there were 139,200 units in the electric vehicle fleet in Ukraine (excluding industrial electric vehicles, trolleybuses, and rail vehicles).

In September 2025, a third of all new cars sold were electric, a sharp increase from 15% a year ago.

== United Kingdom ==
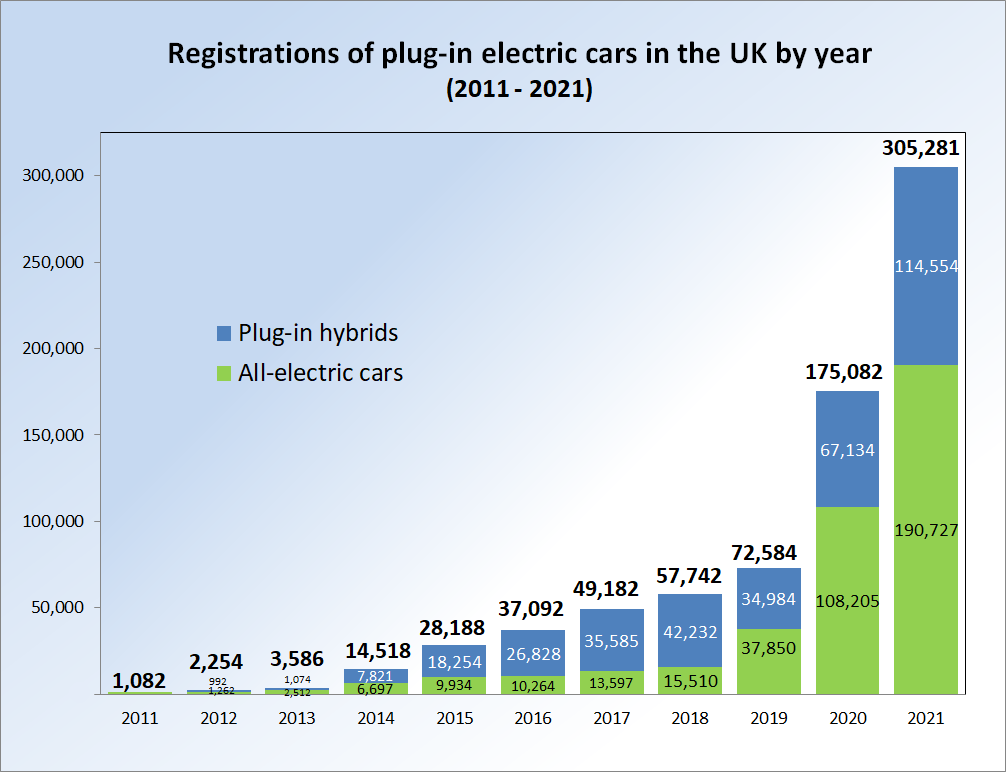
Annual registration of plug-in electric cars in the UK between 2011 and 2021

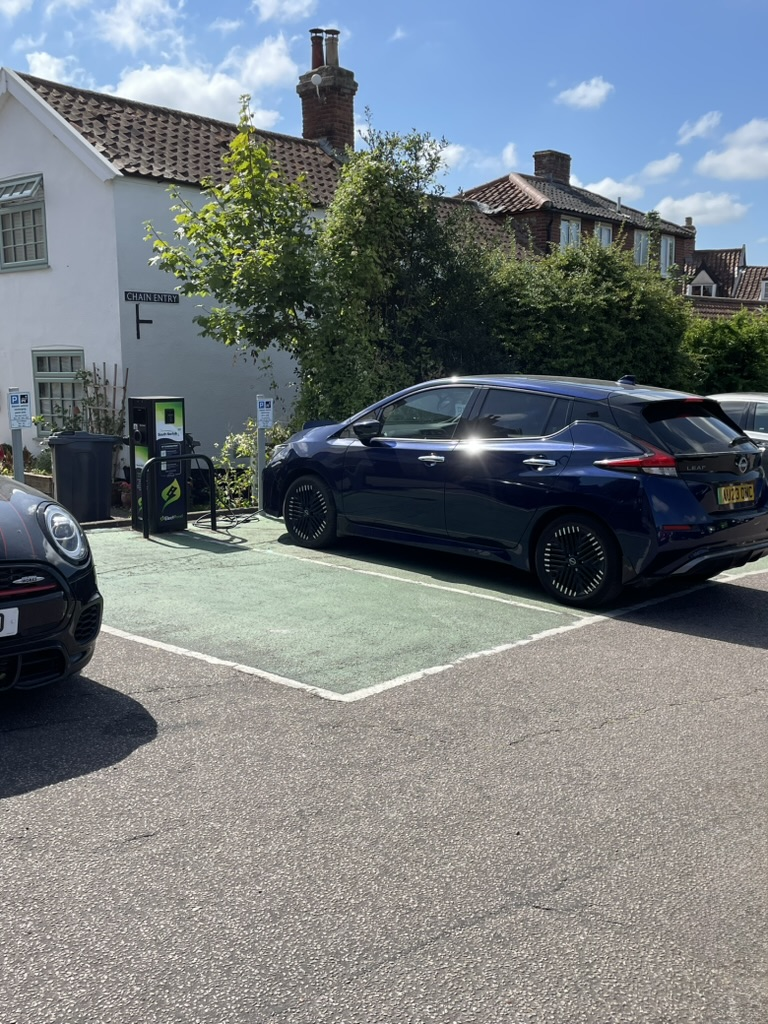
A 2023 Nissan Leaf charging in Wymondham, Norfolk

About 745,000 light-duty plug-in electric vehicles had been registered in the UK up until December 2021, consisting of 395,000 all-electric vehicles and 350,000 plug-in hybrids.

As of March 2026 the UK had 119,080 public charging points at 46,107 locations.

A surge in plug-in car sales took place beginning in 2014. Total registrations went from 3,586 in 2013, to 37,092 in 2016, and rose to 59,911 in 2018. Sales climbed to 72,834 plug-in cars in 2019, and surged again in 2020 to 175,339 units, despite the global strong decline in car sales brought by the COVID-19 pandemic, and achieved record sales of 305,281 units in 2021.

The market share of the plug-in segment went from 0.16% in 2013 to 0.59% in 2014, and achieved 2.6% in 2018. The segment market share was 3.1% in 2019, rose to 10.7% in 2020, and achieved a record 18.6% in 2021.

In April 2026 a record of 40% of new cars sold where plug in electric (26.2% of which were fully electric)

As of May 2026 the top selling EV in the UK is the Tesla Model Y with 116,000 units sold.

=== Government incentives ===
The government offered purchase incentives via the Plug-in Car Grant program beginning in 2011. The program was extended to include vans in February 2012 and in October 2016 to include large electric trucks. As of September 2018, a total of 176,962 eligible cars have benefited with the subsidy since the launch of the Plug-in Car Grant in 2011, and, as of September 2018, the number of claims made through the Plug-in Van Grant scheme totaled 5,218 units since the launch of the programme in 2012. In April 2014 and December 2015, the government extended the program with modifications. Eligible ultra-low emission vehicles (ULEVs) included hydrogen fuel cell vehicles.

Separately, the government subsidized homeowners to install charge points at home via the "Electric Vehicle Homecharge Scheme". All-electric vehicles and eligible plug-in hybrids qualify for a 100% discount from the London congestion charge. However, effective from 8 April 2019, the ULED scheme will be replaced with the Cleaner Vehicle Discount, which restrict the discount only to vehicles which are Euro 6, emit up to 75g/km of CO_{2} and have a minimum 32-kilometre (20 mi) zero-emission range. A further phase from October 2021 will mean that only zero-emission vehicles (battery electric vehicle and hydrogen fuel cell vehicles) will qualify for the discount, which will be phased out completely from December 2025.

== United States ==
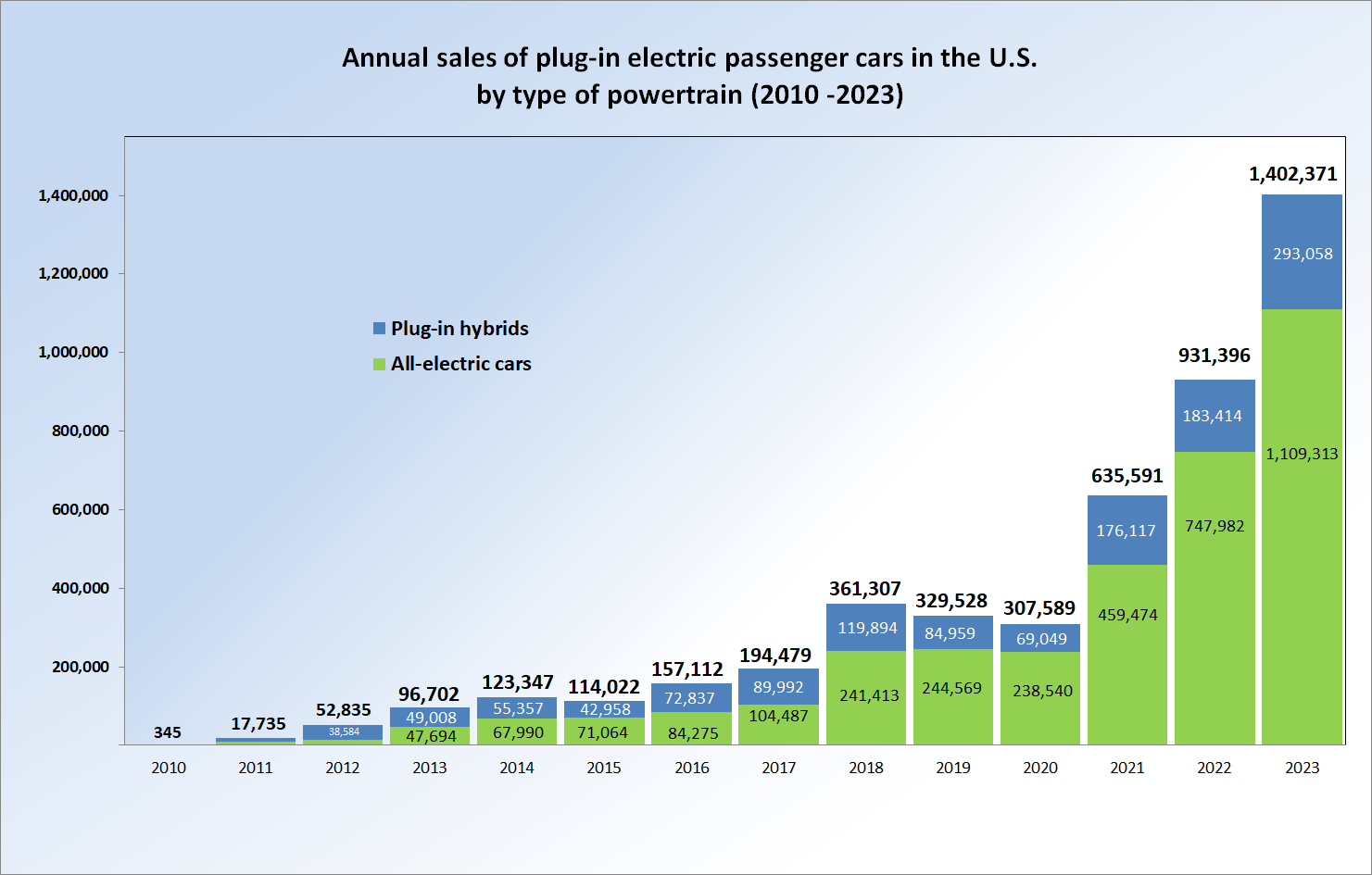
U.S. annual sales of plug-in passenger cars between December 2010 and 2023

As of June 2025, cumulative sales of highway legal plug-in electric cars in the U.S. totaled 7,044,757 units since 2010. California is the largest plug-in regional market in the country, with 1 million plug-in cars registered by November 2021, 46% of the national stock. The other nine states that follow California Air Resources Board's Zero Emission Vehicle (ZEV) regulations accounted for another 10% of the American stock.

California is the largest plug-in regional market in the country, with plug-in car sales of 237,618 units in 2021, up from 132,742 in 2020 (+79.0%). The state's plug-in segment market share increased from 4.9% in 2017, to 8.1% in 2020, and reached 12.8% in 2021.

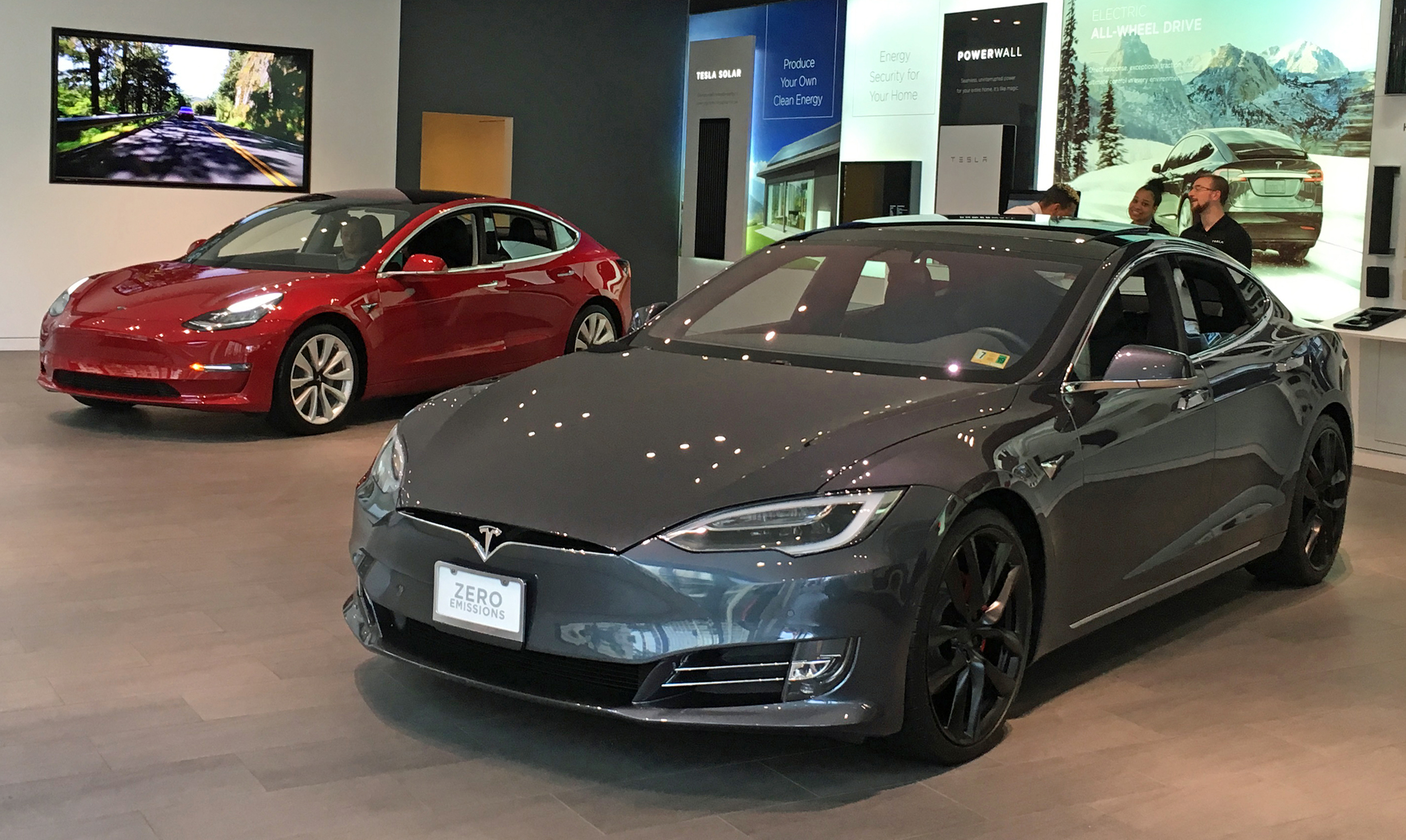
The Tesla Model S (front) was the U.S. best selling plug-in car from 2015 to 2017, and the Tesla Model 3 (back) has led sales from 2018 and 2020.

The American plug-in segment had a market share of 1.13% in 2017, up from 0.90% in 2016, then rose to 2.1% in 2018. A slightly declined to 1.9% occurred in 2019, rose to 2.2% in 2020, 4.0% in 2021, 6.8% in 2022, and achieved 9,4% in 2023.

Until 2018, the Chevrolet Volt plug-in hybrid was the all-time best selling plug-in electric car with 152,144 units of both generations. The Tesla Model 3 all-electric car surpassed in 2019 the discontinued Chevrolet Volt to become the all-time best selling plug-in car in U.S. history, with an estimated 300,471 units delivered since inception, followed by the Tesla Model S with about 157,992, and the Chevrolet Volt with 157,054. The Tesla Model S was the best selling plug-in car in the U.S. for three consecutive years, from 2015 to 2017, and the Model 3 topped sales also for three years running, from 2018 to 2020.

As of April 2021, three US states have introduced government mandates to ban the sale of gasoline powered cars in the future to push the transition to electric vehicles. Washington state's legislation would ban all sales and registrations of gasoline powered light vehicles made for or after their 2030 model year. California would ban the sale of all new fuel burning cars by 2035. Massachusetts would ban the sale of all new gasoline powered cars by 2035.

In December 2021, the Biden administration imposed Executive Order 14057, which is a nationwide federal government mandate that will ban new fossil fuel vehicles from all 50 US States, Washington, D.C., and all US Territories by 2035 to push the transition to electric vehicles. The order will ban new car sales of fossil fuel-powered government-owned vehicles by 2027, new fossil fuel-powered buses by 2030, and both new fossil fuel-powered privately owned vehicles and new fossil fuel-powered commercial-owned vehicles by 2035. The US Environmental Protection Agency also unveiled stringent automotive emissions and fuel economy requirements for internal combustion engine-powered vehicles that will become mandatory on all new US-market ICE-powered vehicles starting for the 2023 model year. The standards will also get tougher and more stringent for the 2026, 2029, and 2032 model years. The new regulations will also require at least 20% of all new vehicles sold in the United States to be 100% all-electric vehicles by 2026, followed by requiring at least 55% of all new vehicles sold in the United States to be 100% all-electric vehicles by 2030, and finally followed by requiring 100% of all new vehicles sold in the United States to be 100% all-electric vehicles by 2035.

== Uruguay ==
Reporting of plug-in electric vehicle sales in Uruguay began in 2019, with 163 vehicles sold. Government financial incentives plus high fossil fuel costs supported a strong annual growth rate, reaching 1,044 BEV vehicles sales in 2022, and a market share of 1.8% of total vehicle sales. To support this continuous growth, the Government extended the tax exemption for the purchase of all-electric vehicles with a retail price of up to US$40.000. BEV sales in 2023 grew by 80.92% to 1,887, a 3.14% market share of total vehicle sales. Total BEV sales in 2024 achieved 5,856 units, more than three times all electric vehicles sold in 2023 with a market share of 8.9% of total vehicle sales. Growth continued in 2025: cumulative sales of the year achieved 14,442 units, 147% more than 2024 with a market share of 20.2%. According to representatives of the fuel station sector this rapid growth had begun to affect the country's fossil fuel market, reporting reductions in dispatched fuel volumes of between 10% and 20% in affluent Montevideo neighborhoods with high concentrations of electric vehicles, such as Punta Carretas, Pocitos, and coastal areas in early 2026. Sales momentum continued in 2026, achieving by the end of October a total of 24,979 BEVs, with a marketshare of 38.3% and surpassing the total of 2025 in only 7 months, without counting Tesla sales. On 17 July 2026 Tesla started direct commercial operations in the country with an aggressive price point for their Model 3 and Model Y cars, which drove other brands like BYD to significantly lower their prices in order to keep being competitive. Current sales figures for vehicles are published by the national car retailer association (ACAU), which doesn't include Tesla since their sales are done directly; nevertheless, while informing the first official deliveries of Model Y done on 12 October 2026, it was reported that over 5.000 Tesla cars have been ordered since starting operations in July 2026. Considering that sales of light passenger BEVs (cars and SUVs) were approaching 50% of each category and already surpassing purely combustion models, on 30 June 2026 the Government decided that starting in 1 January 2027 BEVs would start paying the IMESI tax ("Impuesto Específico Interno" or "Specific Internal Tax") according to its import (CIF) value: all passenger BEVs with an import value under 19,000USD will continue with no tax, while those between 19,001USD and 27,000USD of import value will be taxed at 5%; all passenger BEVs over 27,001USD will have a tax of 9%.

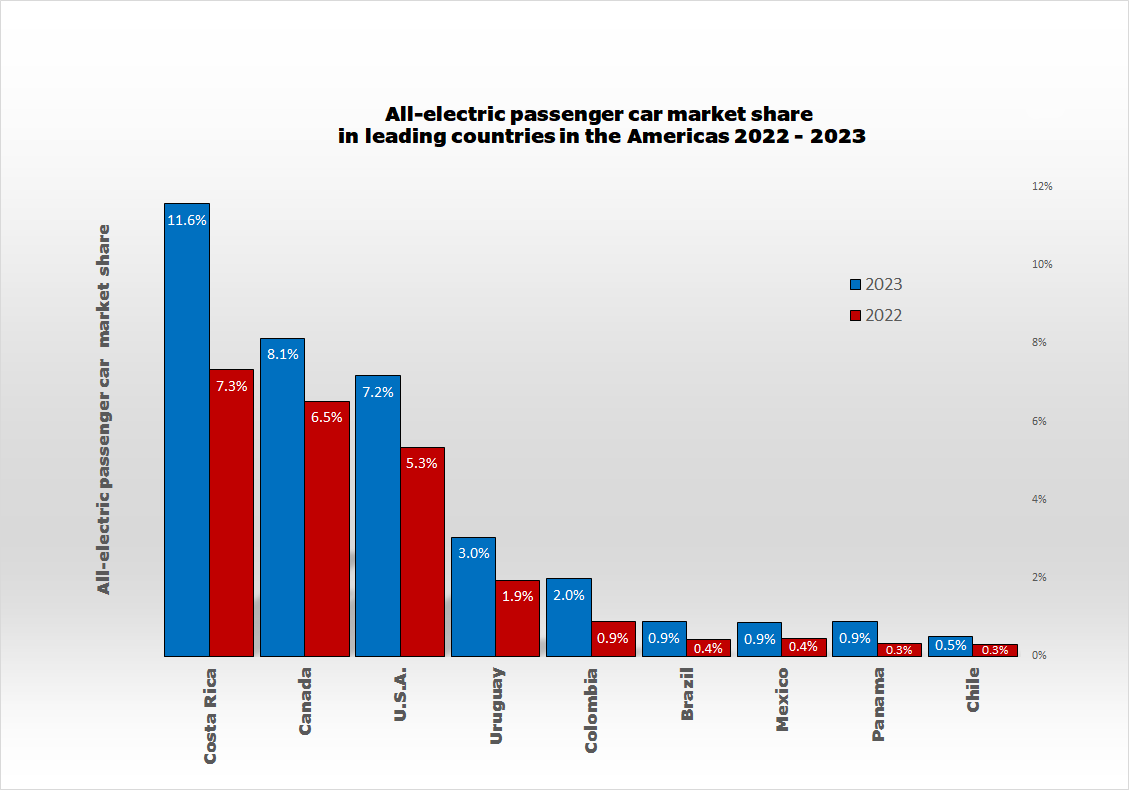
Uruguay ranked as the country with the second largest market share of the all-electric passenger car segment in Latin America, both in 2022 and 2023.

The city of Montevideo had by July 2023 140 BEV taxis in circulation (of a total of around 3,000, or 4.7%), with a target to reach 200 by the end of 2023. The Uruguayan government through its Industry Ministry started offering in November 2022 a US$5,000 subsidy (applied as a post-sale rebate) for the replacement of up to 100 thermal taxis and ride-hailing vehicles: of those, geographically 93 were allocated to Montevideo and 7 to other departments of the country, while 88 were allocated to replacing ride-hailing vehicles, 11 to taxis and 1 to a remisse. Following the previous successful experience, the national Industry Ministry renewed the plan on 27 September 2024, offering this time a US$4,000 subsidy (again, as post-sale rebate) for the replacement of up to 100 thermal taxis, remisses or ride-hailing vehicles for electric ones; even though the subsidy offered is US$1,000 less than the previous program, as an upgrade the program adds a 20% rebate (up to US$400) for the purchase of a car charger, as well as allowing up to 10 subsidy requests per owner. Due to the fact that many taxi and remisse operators purchase their vehicles under leasing, on 9 December 2024 the Industry Ministry added an additional 50 subsidies to be used exclusively for this financing methodology and only for taxis and remisses. As of 22 May 2025, all subsidies have been exhausted. As an additional support, in July 2023 the local government of Montevideo offered a subsidy of 200,000UYU (approximately US$5,000) for the replacement of up to 85 thermal taxis with electric ones, 30 of which were reserved for taxi cooperatives; by May 2025, the Director of Mobility for Montevideo estimated that there were 225 BEV taxis in circulation (about 7.5% of the total). On 7 July 2026 the city's government launched a bid for 50 new taxi permits exclusive for electric vehicles, which would push the BEV taxis to over 9% of the total, with an opening date of 18 September 2026. Focusing on ride-hailing apps, on 15 May 2025 the app Cabify informed that 30% of their rides were done with BEVs, using this opportunity to launch its "ECO" service, using only electric vehicles at the standard service price, while at the same time giving special bonuses for their drivers. By 26 June 2026 Cabify informed that around 60% of the vehicles on their ride-hailing app were BEVs.

Regarding mass transit, as of 2021 there were 32 BEV buses in operation of a total of 5,391 buses nationwide (including urban, suburban and regional buses). The main urban bus transport company in Montevideo (CUTCSA, with 1148 buses) adhered to COP26 emission targets, pledging to achieve a 25% of BEV fleet by 2025 (around 280 buses), reaching 100% by 2040. The first batch of 50 Higer buses (including 6 double-decker for tourist services), shipped in August 2024, arrived in Montevideo on 16 October 2024 and started operations in November 2024. The second batch of Higer buses (all suburban units) was shipped in December 2024, arriving in Montevideo on 25 February 2025 and starting operations on 24 March 2025. On 11 April 2024 CUTCSA announced the signature of the contract for the delivery of 100 BYD K9UD electric buses, order starting in 2024 to be completed by June 2025. On 19 September 2024 BYD delivered those 100 K9UD buses on their factory in Qingdao, China with the presence of CUTCSA authorities, the first 50 arriving on 3 December 2024 and starting operations in January 2025. The second batch of 50 BYD K9UD buses were shipped from Shanghai on 20 July 2025, arriving in Montevideo on 1 October 2025, for a total of 221 electric buses for the company (about 19% of the fleet). On 8 September 2025 it was announced that the CAF – Development Bank of Latin America had provided a loan to CUTCSA of 20 Million USD, in order to purchase the remaining 60 electric buses to achieve the company's electrification target. The first 30 of this batch (Higer Azure for urban service) arrived on 12 April 2026, while the remaining 30 (BYD K9UD buses) arrived on Montevideo on 28 April 2026. During 2023 the remaining bus companies in Montevideo, COME and transport cooperatives COETC and UCOT selected Yutong as supplier for another batch of locally adapted electric buses (divided windows, different couches, among others), being 9 for COETC, 7 for UCOT and 5 for COME; the first one (a prototype, destined for COETC) arrived in February 2024, while another 19 arrived at late April (a final one, for UCOT, arrived in October 2024). The local government of Montevideo issued in February 2024 a US$37.3 million bond for the replacement of an additional 90 diesel buses for electric ones (to be distributed 60 for CUTCSA and the remaining 30 among the bus cooperatives), funds to be managed by the local Transport Authority. For the rest of the country, the national government program "Subite Buses" funded the investment of several Departments' local governments to purchase 10 additional electric buses in 2023. On 28 November 2023, the Subite Buses program delivered the first electric buses to de departments of Maldonado, Flores, Tacuarembo and Salto, expecting to deliver buses to the departments of San Jose, Artigas and Río Negro by February 2024. In Durazno, the local company Nossar purchased two Ankai electric buses for their urban service, which started operations in July 2023. Meanwhile, on 6 February 2024 the Department of Canelones announced the purchase of 8 electric buses (from Yutong, Ankai and Guangtong) for their urban and suburban lines, to be distributed among 5 mass transit companies; those buses were presented on 10 May 2025, also mentioning that an additional bus was being acquired through the "Subite Buses" program. On 12 October 2025 the company CODESA, which operates urban and suburban transport services in the Department of Maldonado, announced the purchase of 4 Akai electric buses, which were presented on 25 November 2025, adding a Skywell bus on 3 September 2026. The national government informed on 20 June 2024 that it was revamping the so called "gasoil trust fund", that helped subsidize the cost of diesel fuel for buses, as well as replacements of units; the new trust fund will stop funding new diesel buses, accepting only new electric buses to receive the subsidy (all previously funded buses will continue to receive funding). Regarding regional bus services, the ferry company Buquebus (serving the international route between Argentina and Uruguay) adquired a Guangtong GTX EV bus for their passenger transfer service between their Uruguayan ports (Colonia and Montevideo) and the cities of Montevideo (for ferry services reaching the port of Colonia) and Punta del Este, with an estimated range of 600km.

Alongside the increasing sales there has been a strong expansion of the charging network: there were 150 charging stations at the end of 2022 (most of them slow charging), with a target of 300 public charging stations, or one every 50 km, by the end of 2023. Finally, on 19 March 2024 the 300th charger was turned on in the city of Trinidad, Flores Department, by the President of the Republic, Luis Lacalle Pou. On 15 May 2024 Silvia Emaldi, the president of the national electric company (UTE), indicated that the country had decided to implement the European standard for the chargers, basically Type 2 and CCS2, but will maintain the ones already installed that had the Chinese standard so that older vehicles could use the network. On 15 March 2024 the company Evergo, working with local renewable energy company Ventus, announced plans for a private network of electric chargers, investing u$s 5M to achieve the installation of 240 chargers throughout the country in three years (around 80 per year), of which 40% will have 50kW of power, while the 60% remaining will have 20kW. On 13 September 2024 another company, eOne, announced a plan for the installation of 100 DC fast chargers in the following 12 months, starting with a 5-charger station and following up with 18 additional chargers in 2024. On 21 November 2024 UTE opened the first ultra-fast DC charging station in Montevideo (up to 480kW) donated by Huawei; initially with two charging ports, the station (powered at 600kW but upgradeable to 720kW) is expected to increase its size to 12 charging ports in the near term. On 27 July 2025 it was reported that at the moment there are 460 charging points in the country, with 363 being managed by UTE and the remaining by private companies; additionally, UTE plans to install 70 new fast chargers during the rest of the year, focusing on densification of the network in an attempt to reduce its constrains. On 15 August 2025 the national oil company (ANCAP) opened a specially designed area on its service station next to the airport of Montevideo (Carrasco - MVD) with 6 new fast chargers, as a concept to be expanded to other service stations around the country. On 18 January 2026 UTE informed a total of 437 chargers managed by the national company and 150 additional chargers handled by private operators, while also announcing the installation of an additional 300 chargers during 2026. On June 2026 UTE also launched a plan to incentivize the installation of public electric chargers on private grounds to multiply the coverage, while also announcing that the company will gradually remove the price discounts on their chargers, aiming to align their prices to the private charging networks by the end of 2026. Furthermore, during the opening ceremonies of the 12th Latinamerican Congress of Renewables in Montevideo on 28 July 2026, the National Minister of Industry, Energy and Mining, Fernanda Cardona, presented a plan to reach 600 public-operated chargers by the end of 2026 and 1,000 by the end of 2027.

== Vietnam ==
Plug-in electric vehicles in Vietnam maybe start with appearances by VinBus and VinFast VF e34 from Vingroup in 2021.

== See also ==
- Phase-out of fossil fuel vehicles
- Government incentives for plug-in electric vehicles
- List of modern production plug-in electric vehicles
- Neighborhood Electric Vehicle
- List of renewable energy topics by country and territory
- List of countries by vehicles per capita
