= Subaru Sambar =

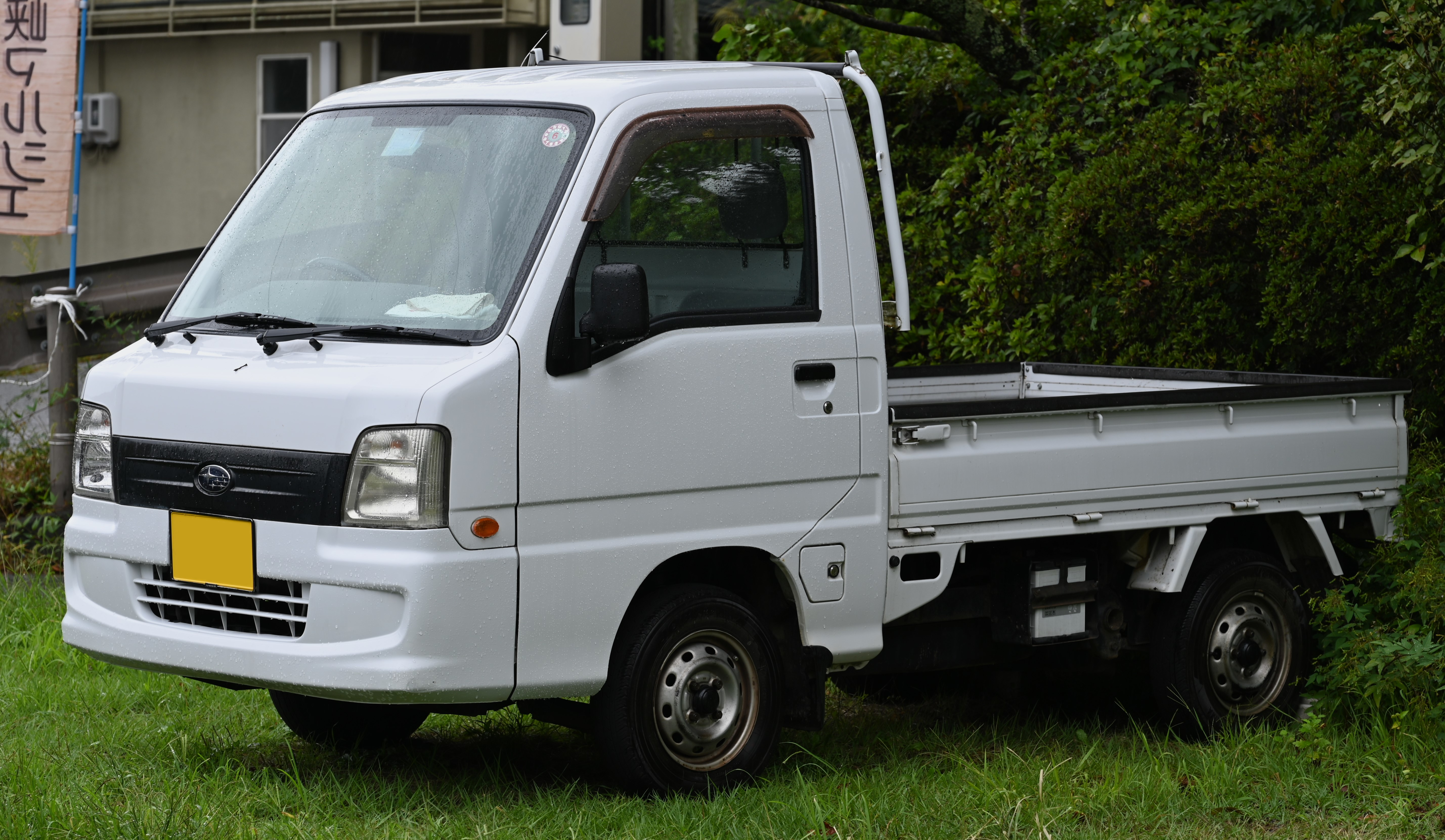

Overview
- Manufacturer: Subaru (Fuji Heavy Industries, 1961–2012); Daihatsu (2012–present)
- Also called: Subaru Dias Wagon; Daihatsu Hijet/Atrai (2012–present); Toyota Pixis Van/Truck (2012–present)
- Production: 1961–present
- Assembly: Japan: Otakita Plant, Ōta, Gunma Prefecture

Body and chassis
- Class: Kei truck Microvan

The Subaru Sambar is a cabover truck and microvan manufactured and marketed by Subaru as Japan's second truck compliant with the country's strict Keitora (軽トラ) or Kei vehicle tax class, after the Kurogane Baby. Introduced in 1961 in microvan and Kei pickup configurations, the Sambar remains in production, now in its eighth generation — beginning with the seventh generation as a rebadged Daihatsu Hijet.

Since its introduction, the Sambar has used a rear engine, rear wheel drive layout with body-on-frame rather than unibody construction. The first two generations used the air-cooled engine from the Subaru 360 and later generations used the water-cooled engine from the Subaru Rex, Vivio and the Pleo. Four-wheel drive became optional in 1980. Sambar models were manufactured in China as the Sanba (Chinese: 三八, romanized: Sānbā) as well as in Finland in a joint venture with Elcat Automotive. Passenger variants of the Sambar were later marketed as the Subaru Dias Wagon.

With the Sambar, named after a species of deer, Subaru may have borrowed from the Volkswagen Type 2 (1951–1967) van — using a marketing name very similar to the Volkswagen's upper trim level, the Samba, and using a similar rear-drive, rear air-cooled engine, cabover configuration. The Sambar was the second Kei truck (after the Kurogane) and was the last Kei-compliant vehicle to use a rear-engine, rear-drive layout.

== First generation (1961–1966) ==
Subaru Sambar (first generation)
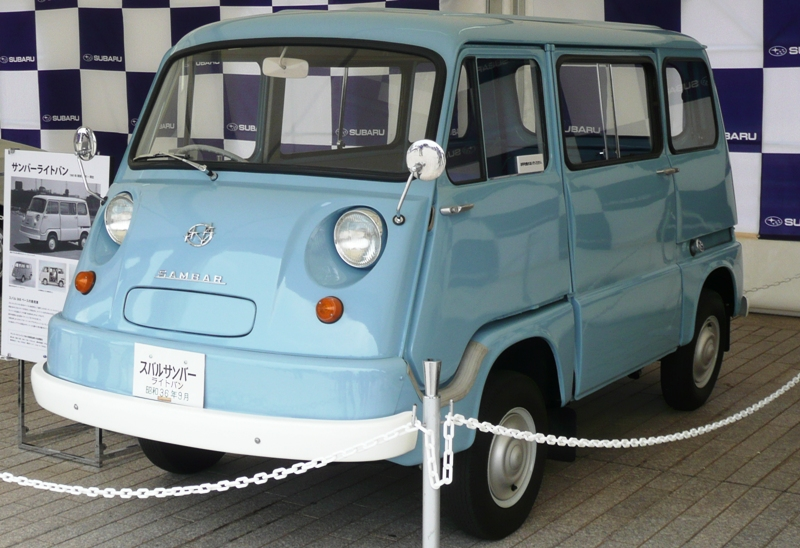
- The first generation (1961–1966)

Overview
- Manufacturer: Subaru
- Production: 1961–1966
- Designer: Shinroku Momose

Body and chassis
- Class: Kei truck
- Layout: RR layout
- Related: Subaru 360

Powertrain
- Engine: 356 cc EK31 two-stroke I2
- Transmission: 3-speed Manual transmission

Dimensions
- Wheelbase: 1,670 mm (65.7 in)
- Length: 2,990 mm (117.7 in)
- Width: 1,300 mm (51.2 in)
- Height: 1,520 mm (59.8 in)
- Curb weight: 470 kg (1,040 lb) (Van); 395 kg (871 lb) (Pickup truck)

Introduced at the 1960 Tokyo Motor Show in passenger and commercial versions, the Sambar featured 4-wheel independent suspension, a rear engine, rear drive layout — and a one-box body configuration based on the Subaru 360 platform and inspired by the 1957 Fiat 600 Multipla. The chassis uses a ladder frame construction, with a rear torsion bar trailing arm suspension. The reverse gearshift position was a left-pattern selection, instead of a right-pattern selection, and the EK series engine could be accessed via a hatch inside the vehicle. Maximum power from the two-stroke twin was 18 PS (13.2 kW; 17.8 bhp). As with the Subaru 360, front doors were rear-hinged. Rear doors were front-hinged, with a rear cargo hatch. Provisional camping bunk beds were available.

Commercial variants of the Sambar were marketed for delivery use, nicknamed the "kuchibiru ([lower] lip)" Sambar, inspired by a competitor, the 1959–1961 Kurogane Baby. Other competitors included the front-engined Suzulight Carry which placed the engine in front of the driver, but also adopted the cabover approach in 1966, and the 1964 Daihatsu Hijet cabover.

The Subaru cabover configuration followed the 1950 Volkswagen Type 2, and was introduced the same year as the 1961 Ford Econoline, and the 1961 Chevrolet Greenbrier.

== Second generation (1966–1973) ==
Subaru Sambar (second generation)
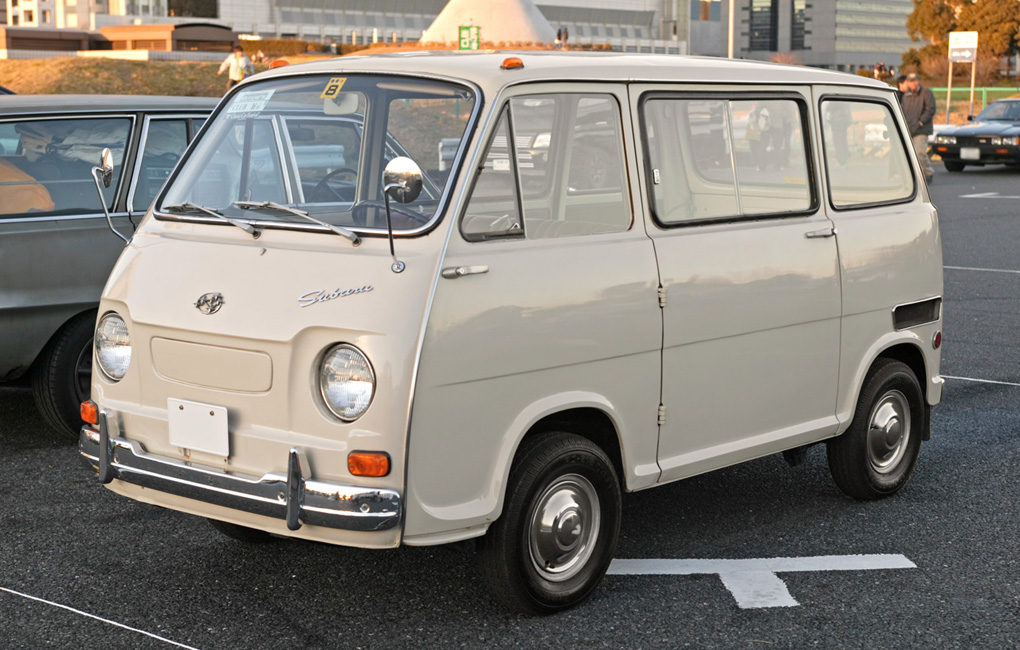
- Second generation, pre-facelift (1966–1973)

Overview
- Manufacturer: Subaru
- Also called: Subaru 360 Van (USA)
- Production: 1966–1973

Body and chassis
- Class: Kei truck
- Layout: RR layout
- Related: Subaru 360; Subaru R-2

Powertrain
- Engine: 356 cc EK31 two-stroke I2; 356 cc EK33 two-stroke I2
- Transmission: 3/4-speed manual

Dimensions
- Wheelbase: 1,750 mm (68.9 in)
- Length: 2,995 mm (117.9 in)
- Width: 1,295 mm (51.0 in)
- Height: 1,535–1,545 mm (60.4–60.8 in)
- Curb weight: 535 kg (1,179 lb) (Van); 465 kg (1,025 lb) (Pickup truck)

The redesigned Sambar debuted in January 1966 with revised styling and a truck variant. The second generation is nicknamed the "baban" Sambar.

The Sambar continued to use the 356 cc EK31 engine, but now in the 20 PS (14.7 kW; 19.7 hp) iteration used in the Subaru 360 since July 1964.

A raised roof for extended headroom was added to the options list in 1968. Starting with the 1970 model year, the engine was accessed from outside the vehicle, and the front doors were conventionally hinged. To enhance safety a full padded dash pad was introduced, sharing the dashboard panel from the new R–2. Along with the facelift, the engine was also updated (EK33) and now produced 26 PS (19.1 kW; 25.6 hp).

The styling was also revised, adding a faux front grille to create a more modern appearance as well as bringing the corporate look of the all new compact Subaru Leone.

The Sambar saw new competitors, the Mazda Porter in 1968, and the Honda Vamos in 1970.

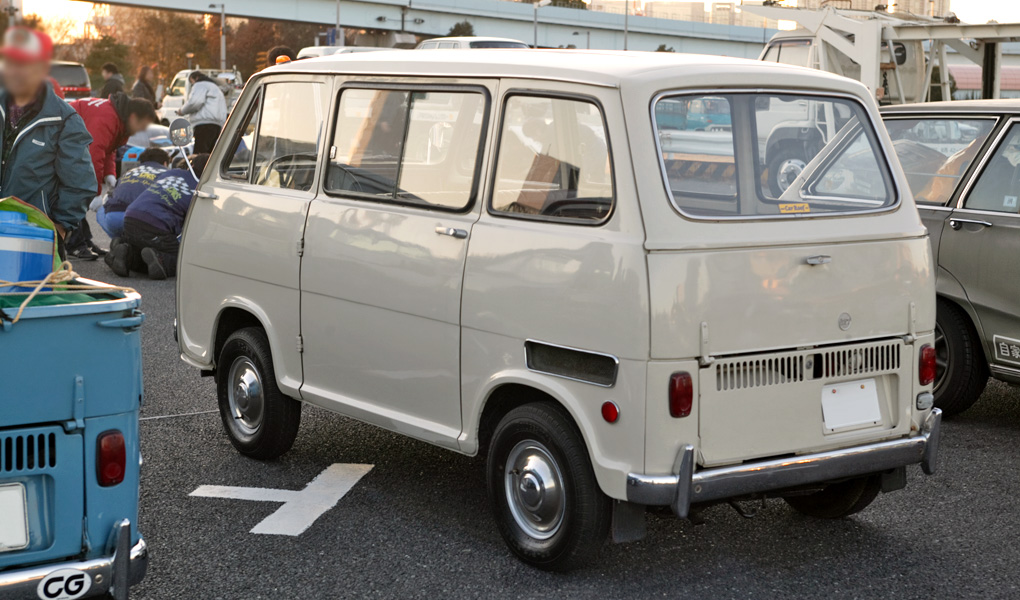
Second generation rear view

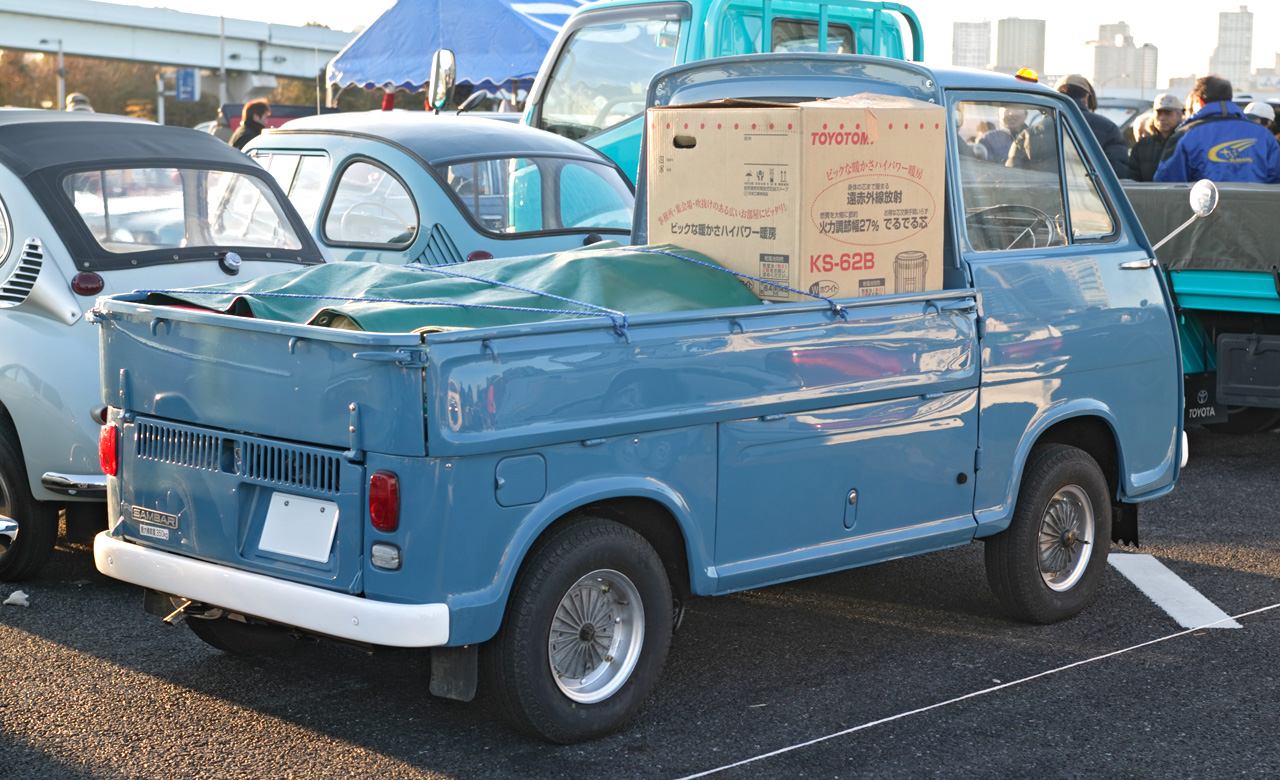
The rear-view of a second generation truck

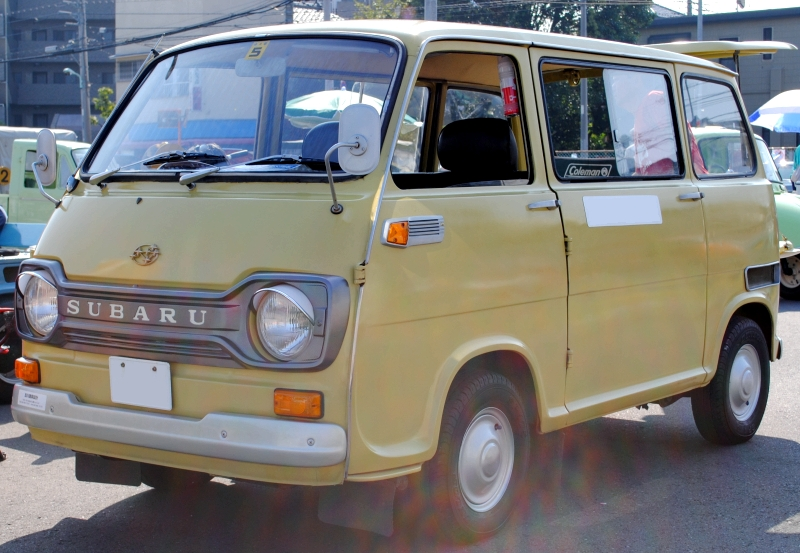
1970 Subaru Sambar mid-model change

== Third generation (1973–1982) ==
Subaru Sambar (third generation)
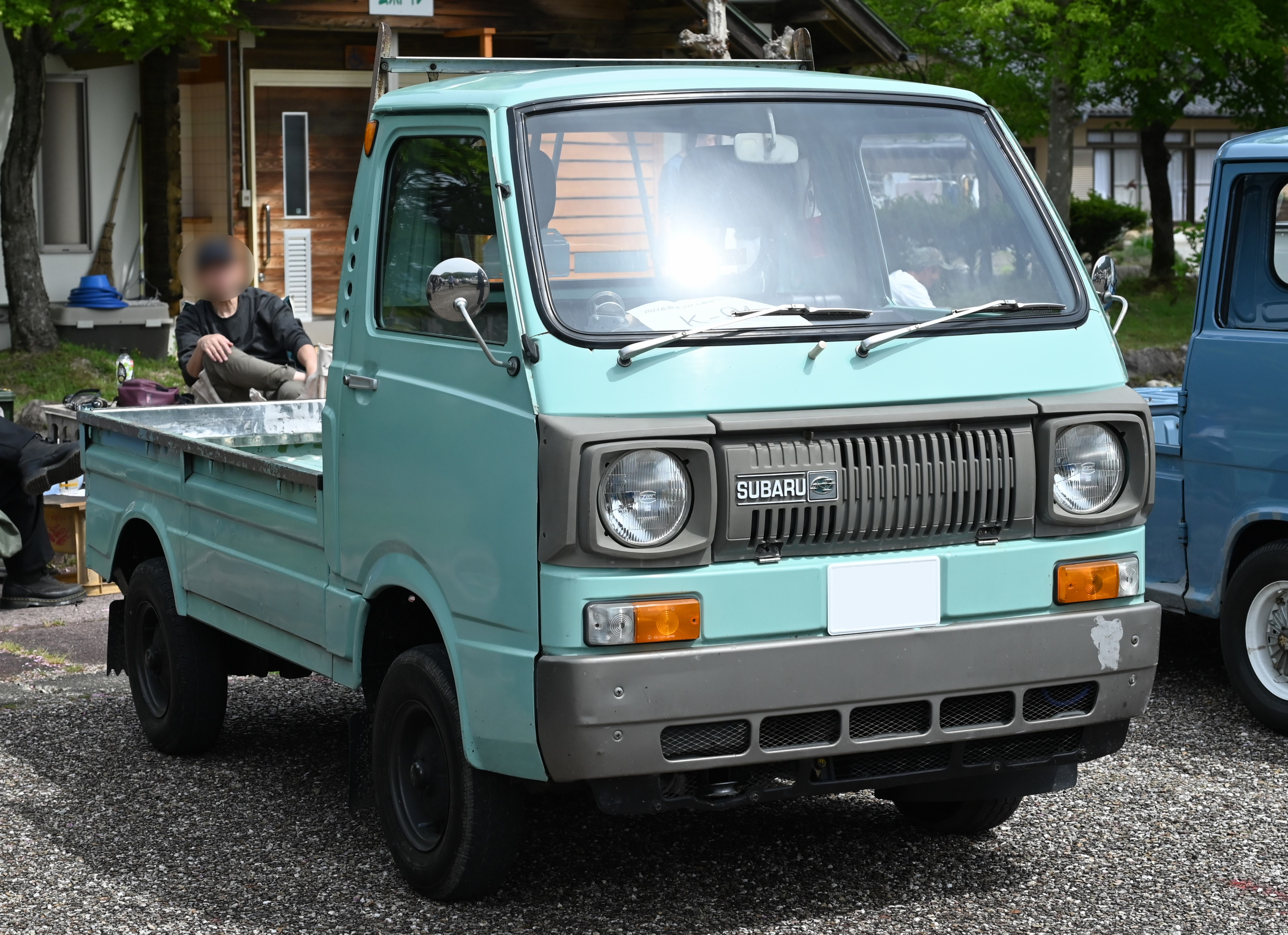
- 1973 Subaru Sambar 360 truck

Overview
- Manufacturer: Subaru
- Also called: Subaru 500/600; Jet Electravan (USA); Sanfu Xiaobawang (Taiwan)
- Production: February 1973–1982
- Assembly: Taicheng, Taiwan (Sanfu Motors)

Body and chassis
- Class: Kei truck
- Layout: RR layout
- Related: Subaru Rex

Powertrain
- Engine: 356 cc EK34 two-stroke I2; 358 cc EK21 I2; 490 cc EK22 I2; 544 cc EK23 I2
- Transmission: 4-speed manual

Dimensions
- Wheelbase: 1,805–1,820 mm (71.1–71.7 in)
- Length: 3,195 mm (125.8 in)
- Width: 1,395 mm (54.9 in)
- Height: 1,850–1,885 mm (72.8–74.2 in)

The third generation appeared on 10 February 1973, this one was nicknamed the "Gōriki (Herculean strength)" Sambar due to an advertising campaign at the time. The first series still carried a two-stroke two-cylinder 356 cc engine but by now water-cooled. Maximum power is 28 PS (21 kW) at 5500 rpm. The engine code was EK34, the truck received the K71 model code while the van was called K81. As of February 1976, the engine was upgraded to the EK21 four-stroke water-cooled version introduced in the Rex to reduce emissions. Claimed maximum power remained the same, but at a much higher engine speed (7500 rpm) and with considerably lower torque figures than the earlier two-stroke type. This model also saw the introduction of an electric window washer pump to improve driver visibility.

=== 550 cc era ===
Because of regulations changes, only three months later the engine was again upgraded with a 490 cc displacement (EK22) engine of a similar layout for the Sambar 5 (K75 truck, K76 panel van, K85 van). This was naturally sold as the Subaru 500 in export markets. This model saw the introduction of a sliding side door on both sides (although a version without the driver's side door remained available), with a full "B" pillar to enhance body stiffness instead of the approach used by the Nissan Prairie which had the front and rear doors interlock.

This was in turn soon replaced by a full 550 cc (EK23) model, the K77/87 of May 1977. In export, the Sambar 550 was known as the Subaru 600. Along with a minor increase in power, the Sambar 550 also brought slight increases in the width and length of the vehicle. Along with larger bumpers, the new bodywork also featured a fully revised front design. Wheelbase and tread also increased by 90 mm (3.5 in). The interior and dashboard were redesigned, and air conditioning became an available option. The Sambar was available in Standard and Super Deluxe models, with the Van also adding the well-equipped Custom L model which included a rear window wiper/washer, a first for the class. A sunroof was added to the options list in 1979. 4WD was introduced as an option in 1980, on both the van and truck bodystyles, coinciding with the same feature being offered on the Subaru Rex.

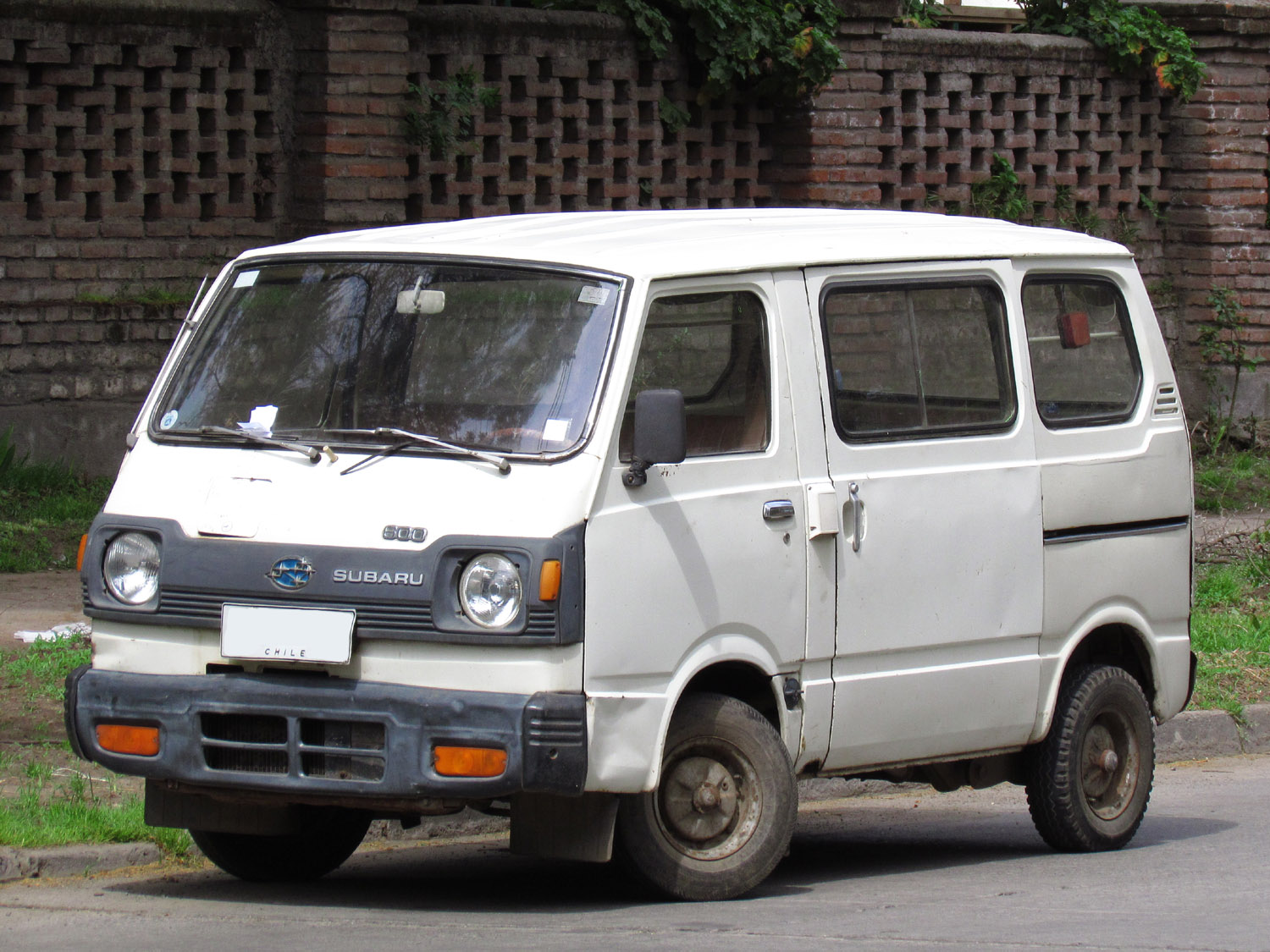
1981 Subaru 600 (export version)

Subaru Sambar 550 Truck

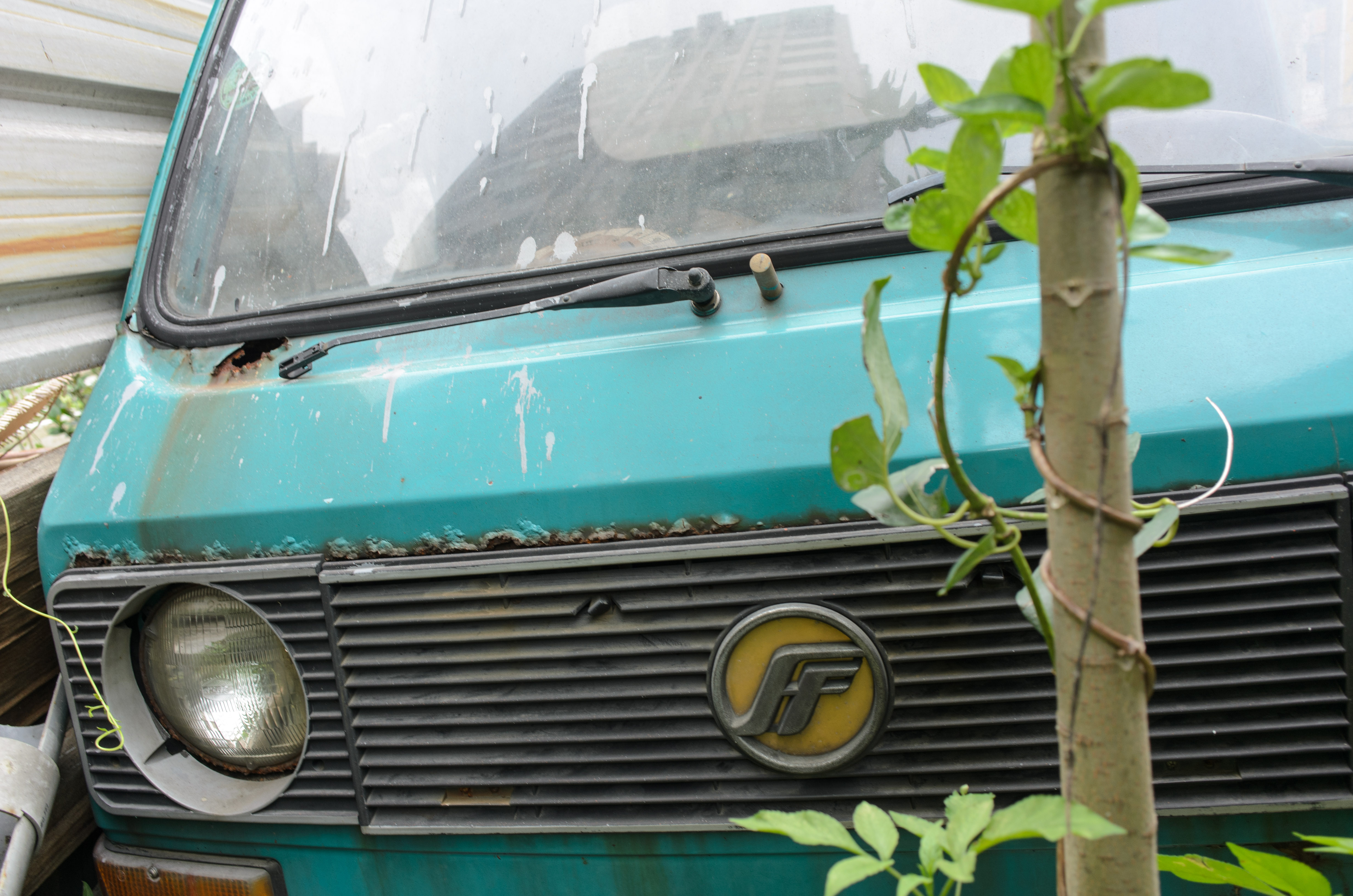
Sanfu model in Taiwan

Facelifted Sanfu Haoyun 600

== Fourth generation (1982–1990) ==
Subaru Sambar (fourth generation)
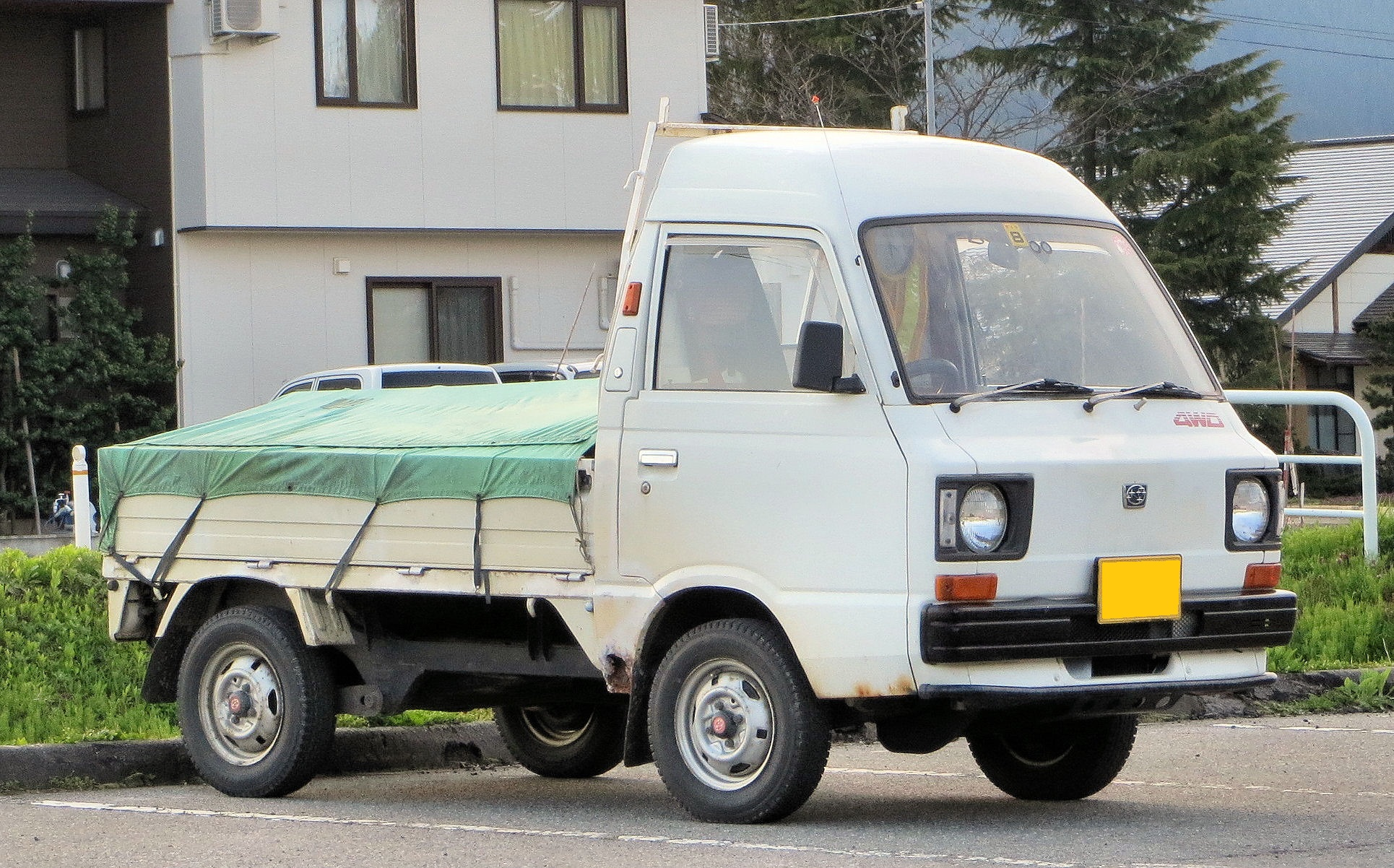
- Subaru Sambar Truck 4WD (early model)

Overview
- Manufacturer: Subaru
- Also called: Subaru 700
- Production: 1982–1990

Body and chassis
- Class: Kei truck
- Layout: RR layout
- Related: Subaru Domingo

Powertrain
- Engine: 544 cc EK23 I2; 544 cc EK23 6V I2; 665 cc EK42 I2
- Transmission: 4/5-speed manual

Dimensions
- Wheelbase: 1,805 mm (71.1 in)
- Length: 3,195 mm (125.8 in)
- Width: 1,395 mm (54.9 in)
- Height: 1,650–1,900 mm (65.0–74.8 in)

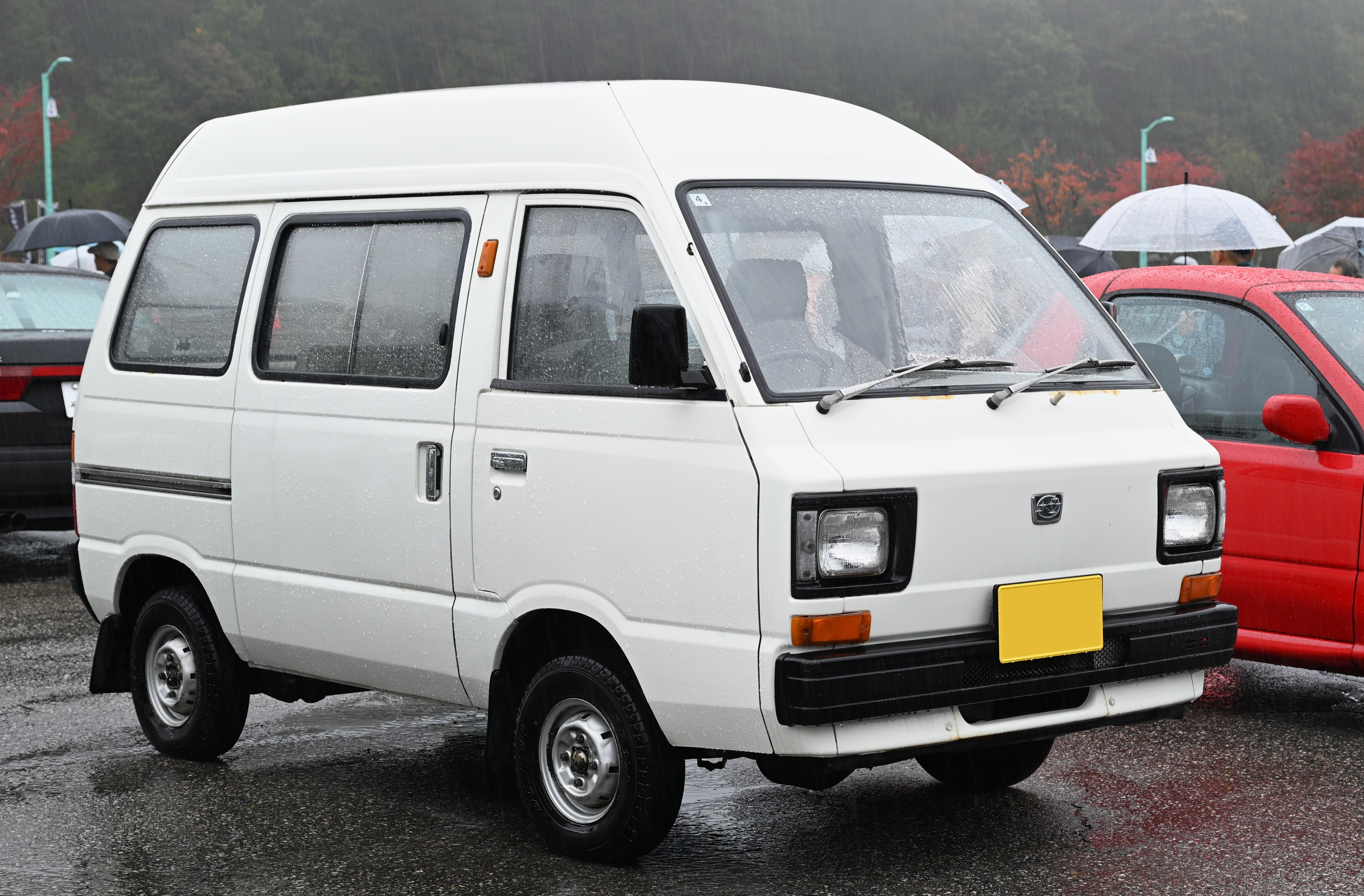

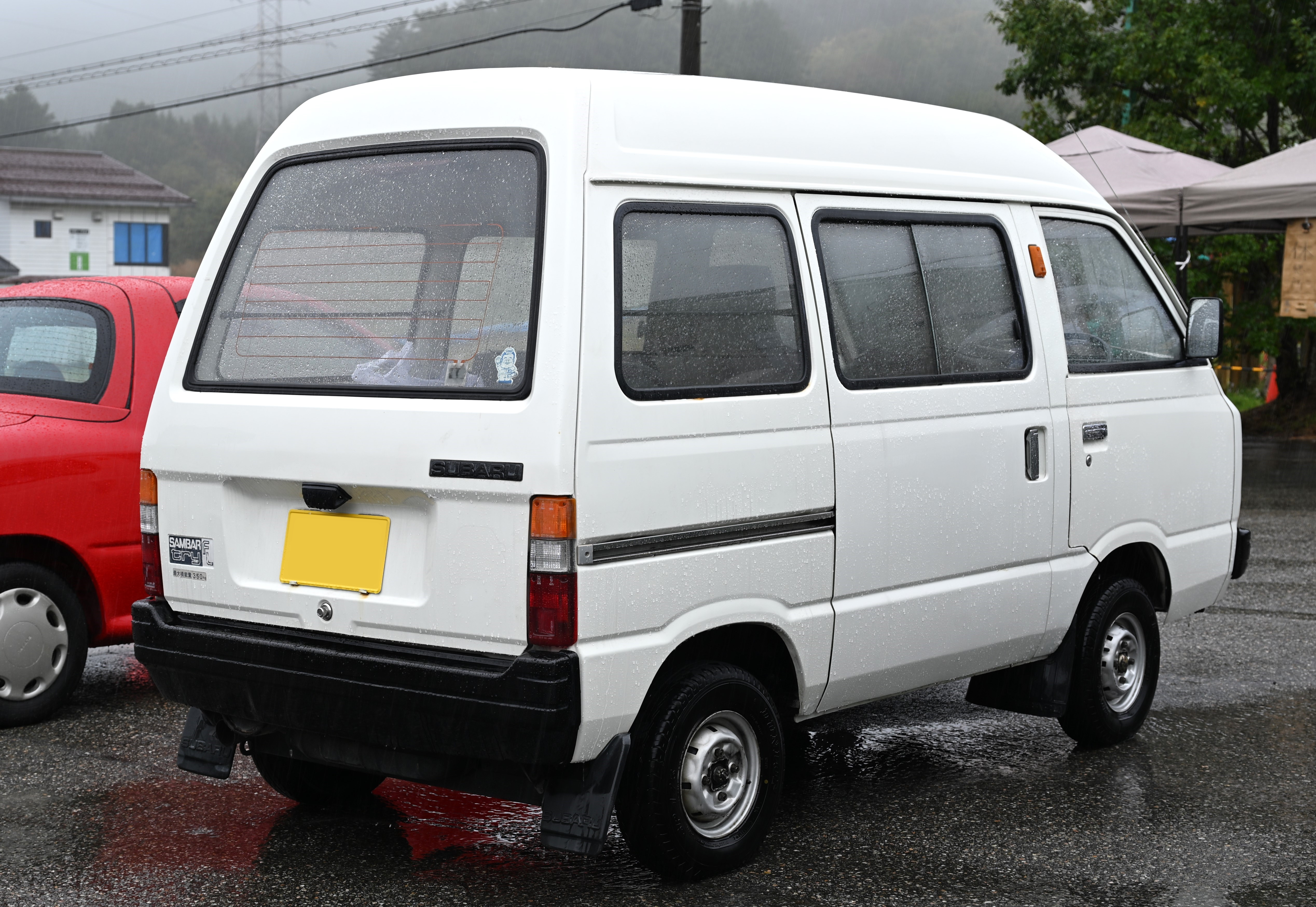
1982–1987 Subaru Sambar Try FL (early model)

May 9, 1982 is when the fourth generation model appeared (KR), with one-box van models marketed as "Sambar Try." The Try was available as a Van with a high or a regular roof, and as a high-roofed passenger model (model code KR). The suspension was upgraded to a four-wheel independent layout with MacPherson struts for the front wheels. The wheel size increased from 10 inches to 12 inches, thereby accommodating larger drum brakes used on all four wheels. The 4WD was available with a dual-range transmission. An automatic clutch was offered in the Sambar Try FL and FX.

While the home market Sambar came equipped with the 544 cc, 2-cylinder 28 PS (21 kW) EK23 engine, export versions (known as Subaru 700) received an enlarged 665 cc version of the same, producing 31 PS (23 kW) and 52 N⋅m (38 lb⋅ft) at 3,500 rpm. LHD versions were available and the 700 was also offered with four-wheel drive.

In May 1986 retracting seat belts became standard fitment and the TG version of the Sambar Try replaced the earlier TX-G. January 9, 1987 saw the commercial one-box versions renamed Sambar Van, while the high roofed passenger version retained the Sambar Try name. Front disc brakes were added to the options list. Full-time 4WD was available towards the end of this generations product cycle. In April 1989, a six-valve engine producing 34 PS (25 kW; 34 bhp) joined the regular engine in high-end versions of the Try and the Sambar truck. The EN05 four-cylinder engine later used in the Rex was never fitted to the KR/KT Sambar, as it would require re-engineering to be a replacement platform. The enlarged Domingo was available with the 3-cylinder EF10 1000 cc engine starting in 1983.

This bigger version of the Sambar was available in Europe from 1983 and went by several names, such as the Subaru Sumo, Libero, Domingo, and Columbuss. The small-bodied version went by the name of Subaru 700 in the few markets where it was available. It went on sale in the United Kingdom in August 1985, in Van form only and with either rear- or four-wheel drive. Subaru's plans involved selling only about 500 examples per year, divided evenly between the drivetrain types.

The primary difference between the Sambar and the larger-engined variants is the extension of both the front and rear bumpers to aid in occupant protection. The larger Domingo (and its various iterations) isn't considered "kei class" because the dimensions exceed the requirements and the engine displacement is larger than regulations allow.

== Fifth generation (1990–1999) ==
Subaru Sambar (fifth generation)
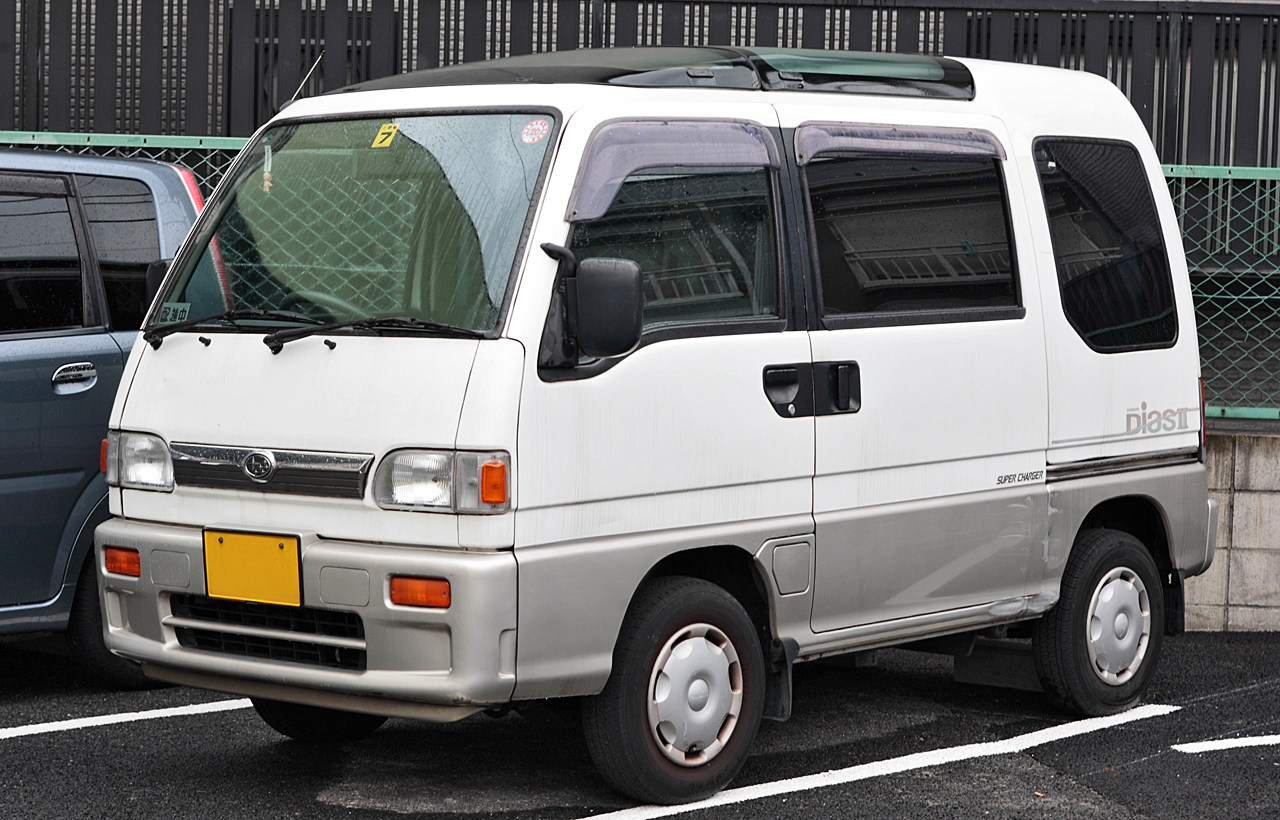
- Subaru Sambar Dias II

Overview
- Manufacturer: Subaru
- Production: 1990–1999

Body and chassis
- Class: Kei truck
- Layout: RR layout or Rear engine 4wd
- Related: Subaru Vivio; Subaru Domingo/Sumo/Libero

Powertrain
- Engine: 658 cc EN07C/F/L/V I4; 658 cc EN07Y supercharged I4
- Transmission: 5-speed manual; 3-speed automatic; CVT

Dimensions
- Wheelbase: 1,885 mm (74.2 in)
- Length: 3,295 mm (129.7 in)
- Width: 1,395 mm (54.9 in)
- Height: 1,760–1,895 mm (69.3–74.6 in)
- Curb weight: 680–990 kg (1,499.1–2,182.6 lb)

The fifth generation Sambar was introduced in 1990. Engine regulations for displacement size were increased and the Sambar's engine was upgraded to 660 cc. For the 4WD version it sold as Subaru Dias Wagon as a permanent trim model. Commercials in Japan used Kuniko Yamada, a Japanese comedian.

The tradition of using the engine in Subaru's kei car offering was continued, with the Subaru Vivio sharing its EN07 engine with this version of the Sambar. The engine now had four cylinders and 40 PS (29 kW) in the carburetted standard model; 55 PS (40 kW) was on tap in the optional supercharged model, coupled with fuel injection. An automatic transmission was offered in the form of Subaru's ECVT system in tandem with full-time 4WD and a viscous coupling differential.

1994 saw a full model change for the Domingo, using the new Sambar design coupled to the Subaru Justy's EF12 SOHC three-cylinder engine displacing 1200 cc. A maximum seating capacity of seven was possible. October 1995 saw the elimination of the ECVT transmission due to drivability issues and a 3-speed automatic was made available instead. A new option for naturally aspirated versions was the EMPi engine, producing 46 PS (34 kW).

Special edition appearance packages were offered including a retro "Dias Classic", later available on the Sambar truck, influenced by the Subaru Vivio Bistro. A Sambar Dias Classic appears in Love Hina as Seta's van.

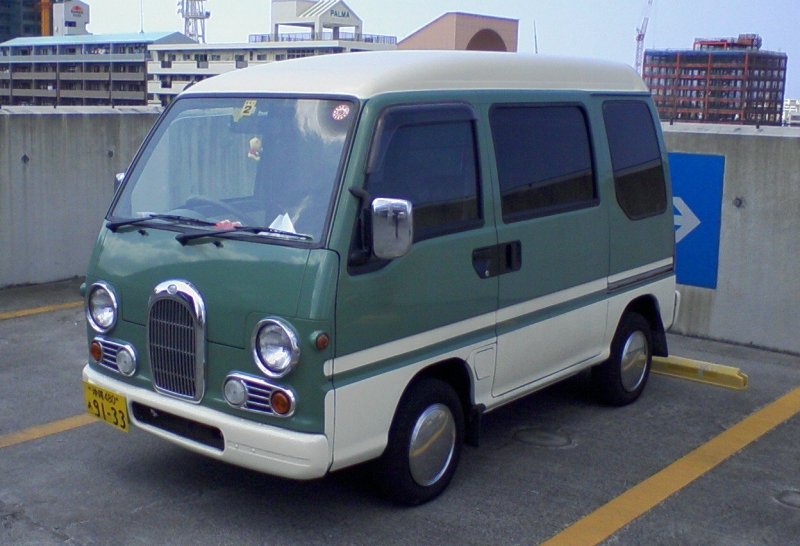
The fifth generation "Dias Classic" (1990–1998)

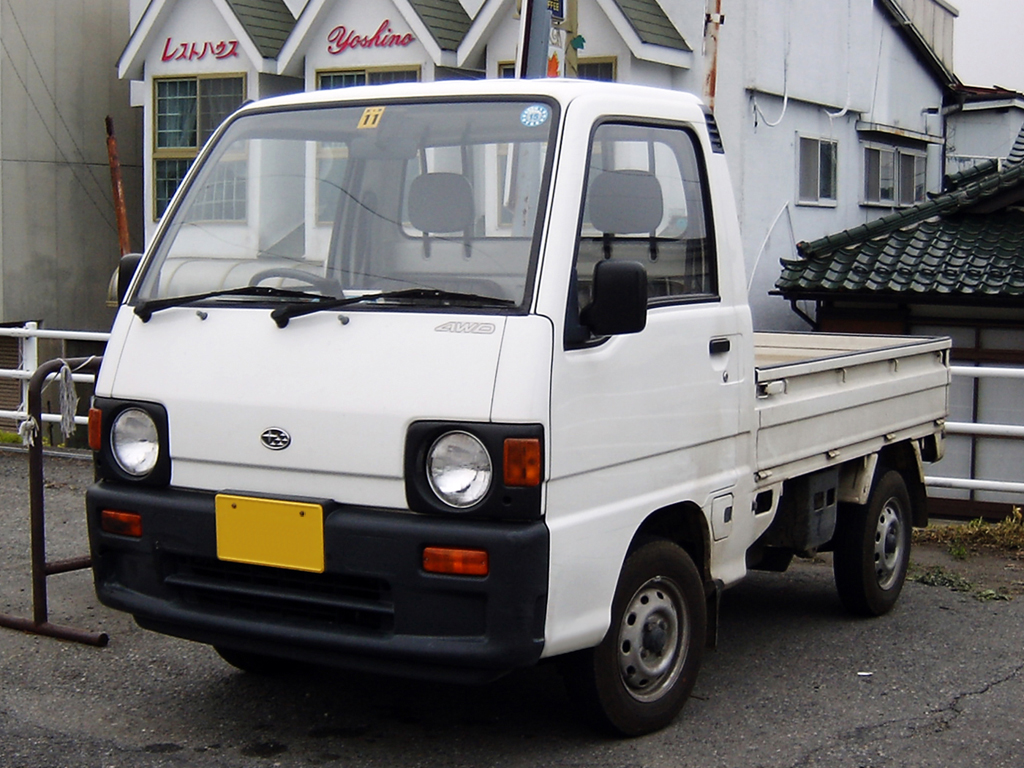
Subaru Sambar truck

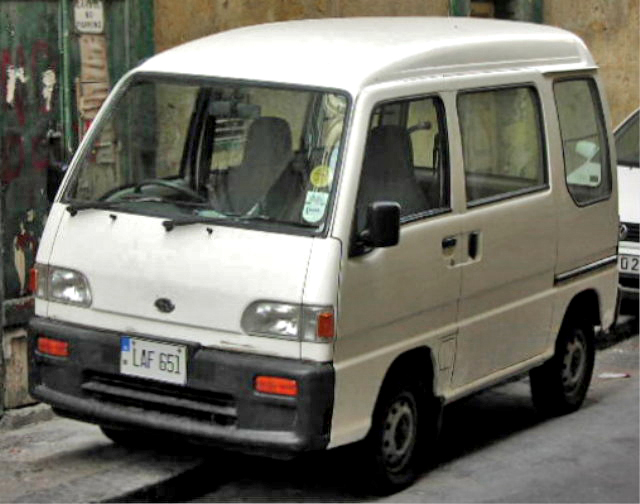
Fifth generation

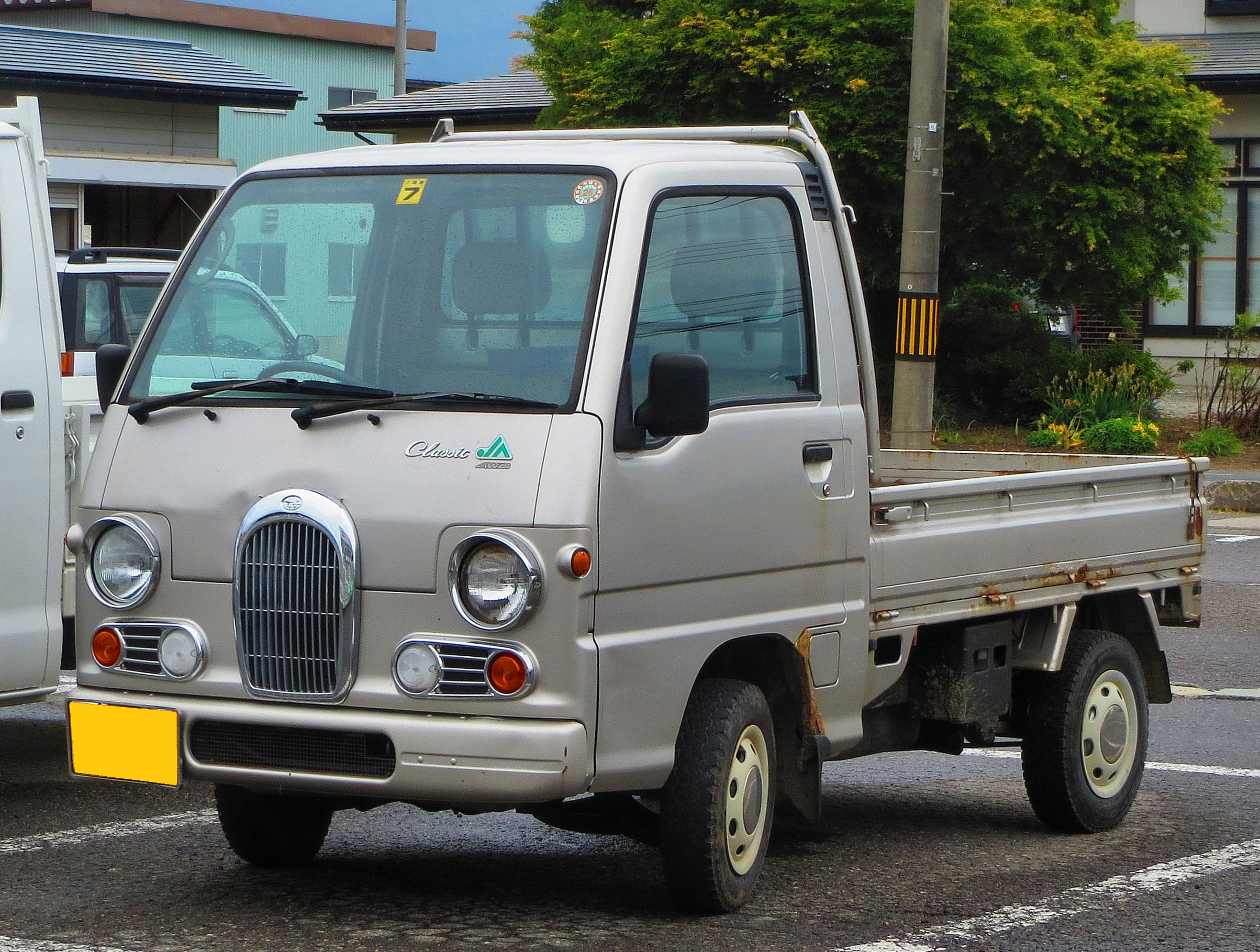
Classic JA Truck AWD

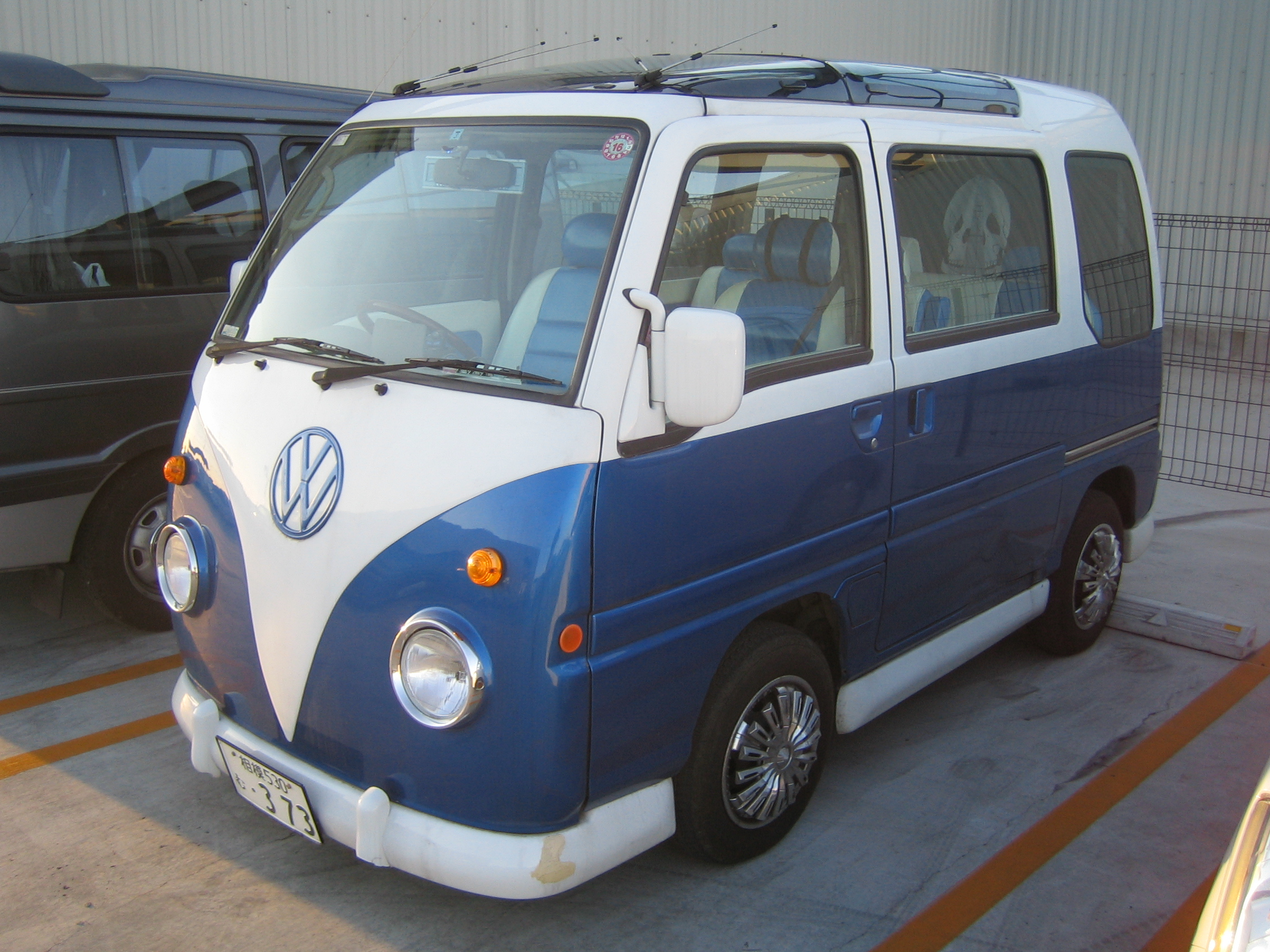
1995 Retro-style Sambar; an aftermarket replica of the Volkswagen Type 2

== Sixth generation (1999–2012) ==
Subaru Sambar (sixth generation)
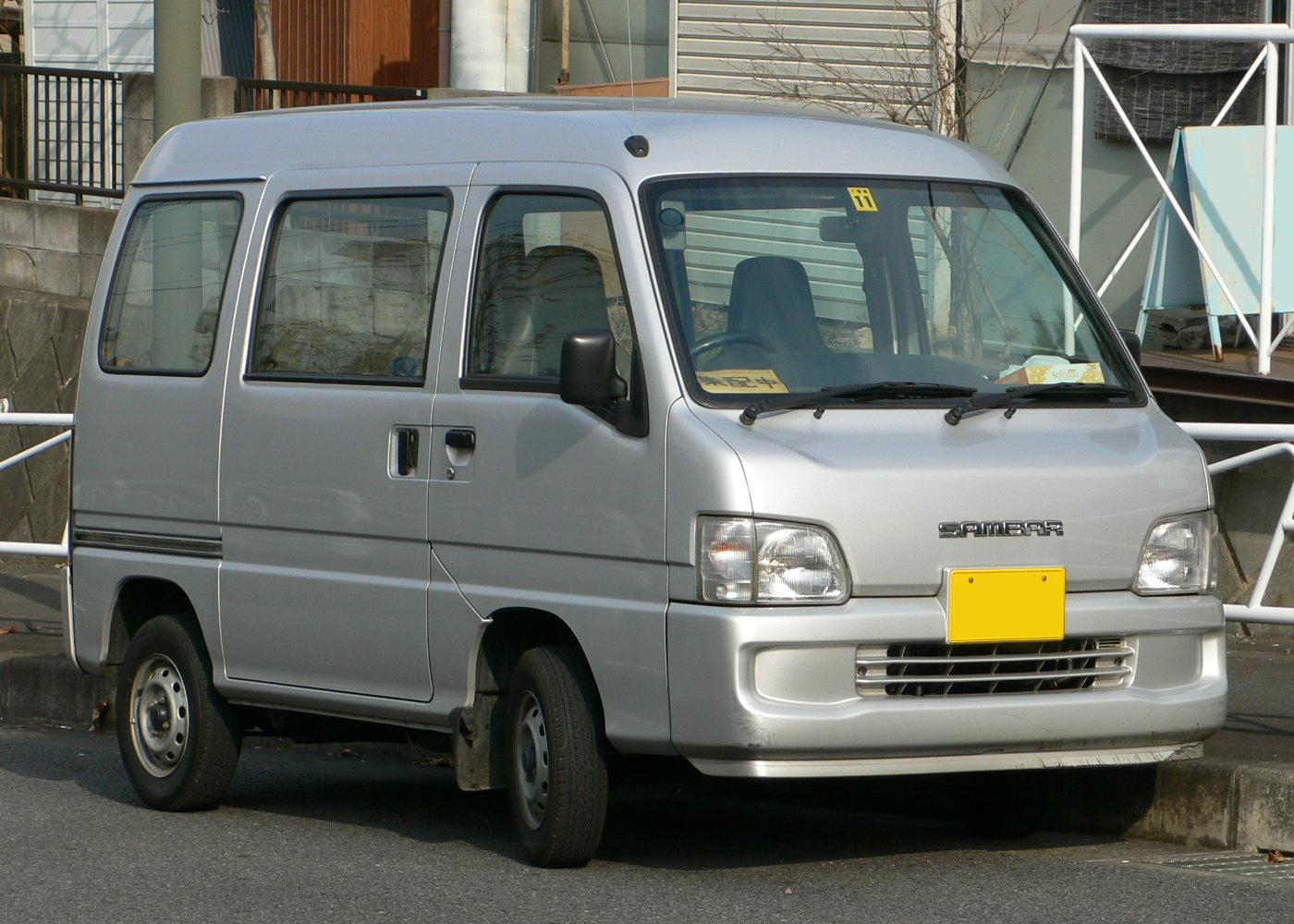
- Subaru Sambar van (1999-2002)

Overview
- Manufacturer: Subaru
- Also called: Subaru Dias Wagon (passenger van variant)
- Production: February 1999– April 2012; February 1999– September 2009 (Subaru Dias Wagon)

Body and chassis
- Class: Kei truck Microvan
- Layout: RR layout
- Platform: TT (truck); TW (Wagon); TV (Van)

Powertrain
- Transmission: 5-speed manual 3-speed automatic

Dimensions
- Wheelbase: 1,885 mm (74.2 in)
- Length: 3,395 mm (133.7 in)
- Width: 1,475 mm (58.1 in)
- Height: 1,815–1,905 mm (71.5–75.0 in)
- Curb weight: 730–1,010 kg (1,609–2,227 lb)

The sixth generation was released in February 1999. It was redesigned as from 1998, kei class vehicle size regulations allowed for an increase in body size. The 4WD Dias is now only offered with a 3-speed automatic transmission, with the supercharger optioned engine power output increased to 58 PS (43 kW). Carburetors are no longer used on the Subaru EN engine for the entire product line, and the EF engine was no longer manufactured. Initially, the naturally aspirated models received single-point fuel injection (EGi); this was replaced with a multi-point system in August 2001. Power increased accordingly, up from 46 to 48 PS (34 to 35 kW).

A passenger car version of the Sambar Dias called the Dias Wagon was released.

To address safety concerns with side impact resistance, on 1 October 1998 the width restriction for kei vehicles was increased to 1,480 mm (58.3 in) and the sixth generation Sambar was widened accordingly. The Sambar was facelifted in September 2002, November 2005, and again in September 2009.

On 18 July 2008, items that were included were dual front passenger airbags, power sliding rear doors, power windows, and leather interior on upper trim level models.

Sambar truck

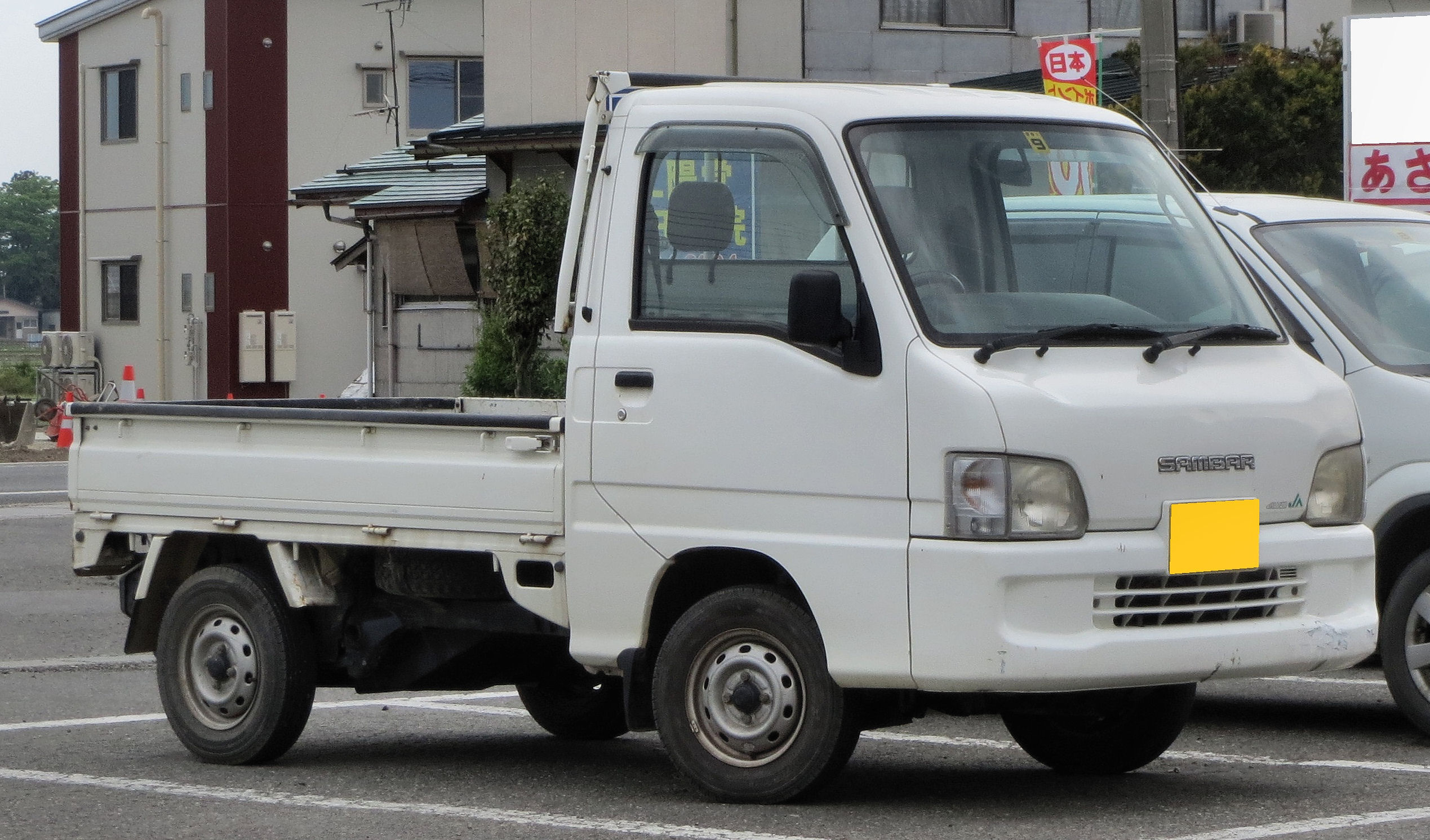
Pre-facelift model (1999–2002)

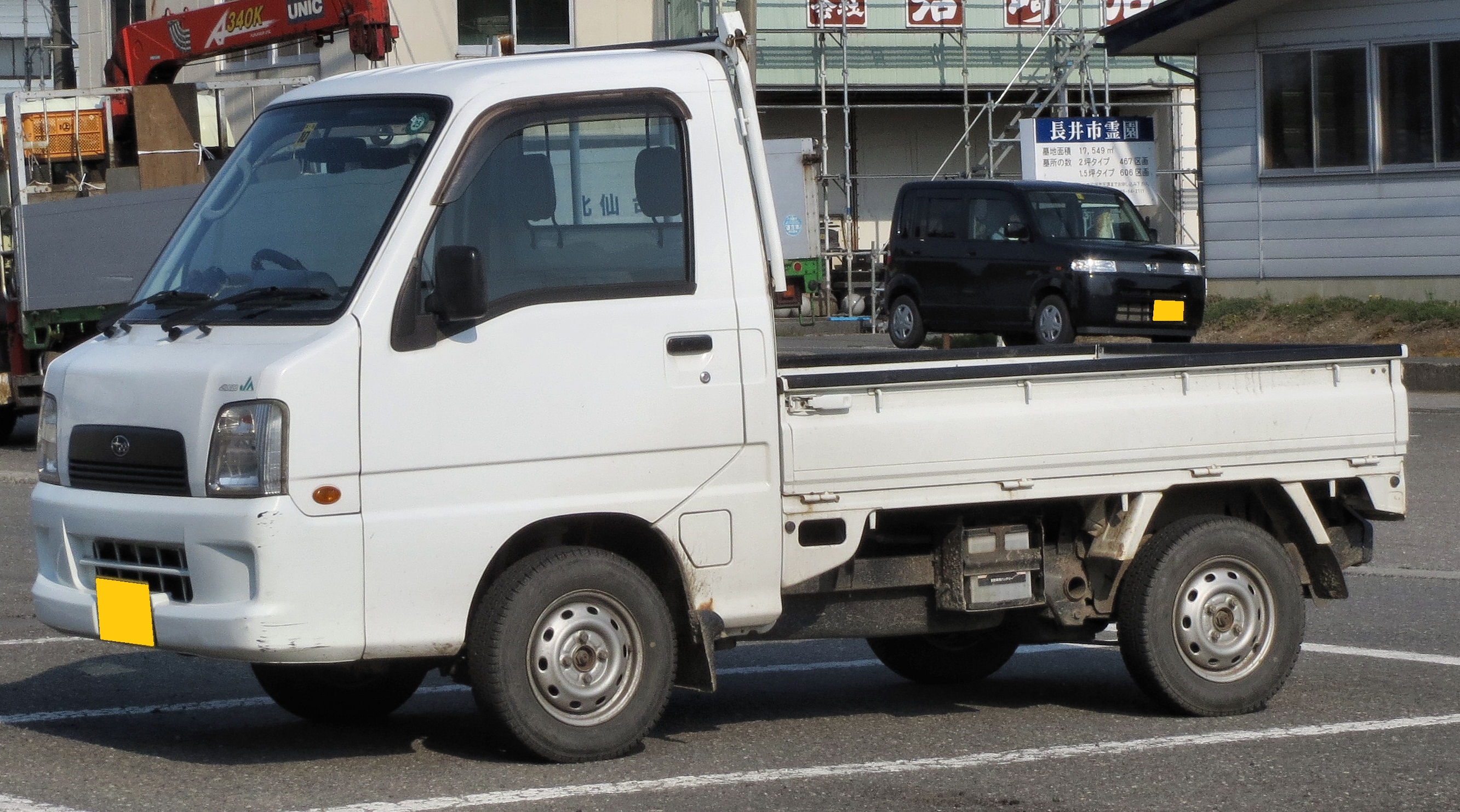
First facelift model (2002-2005)

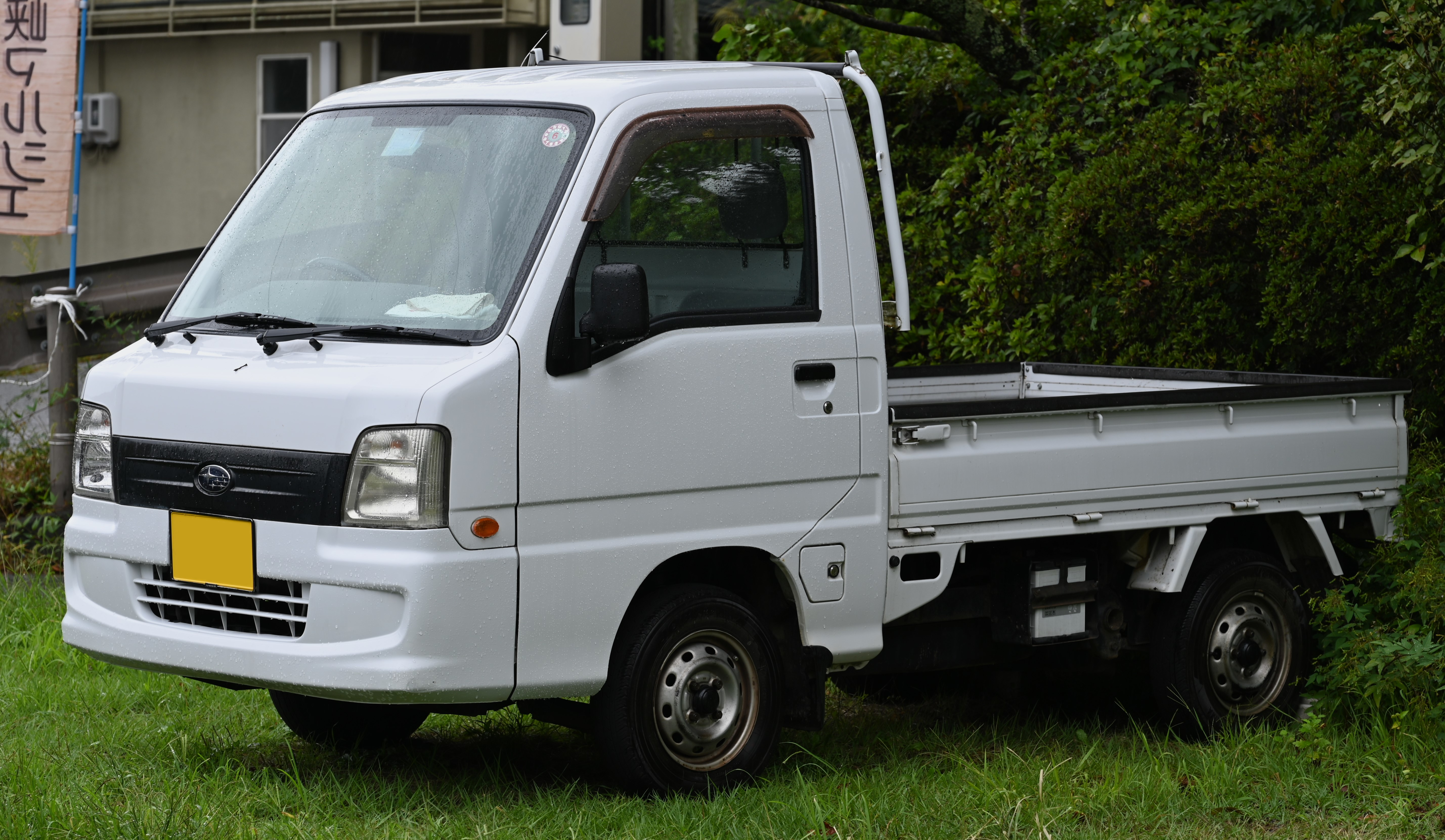
Second facelift model (2005-2009)

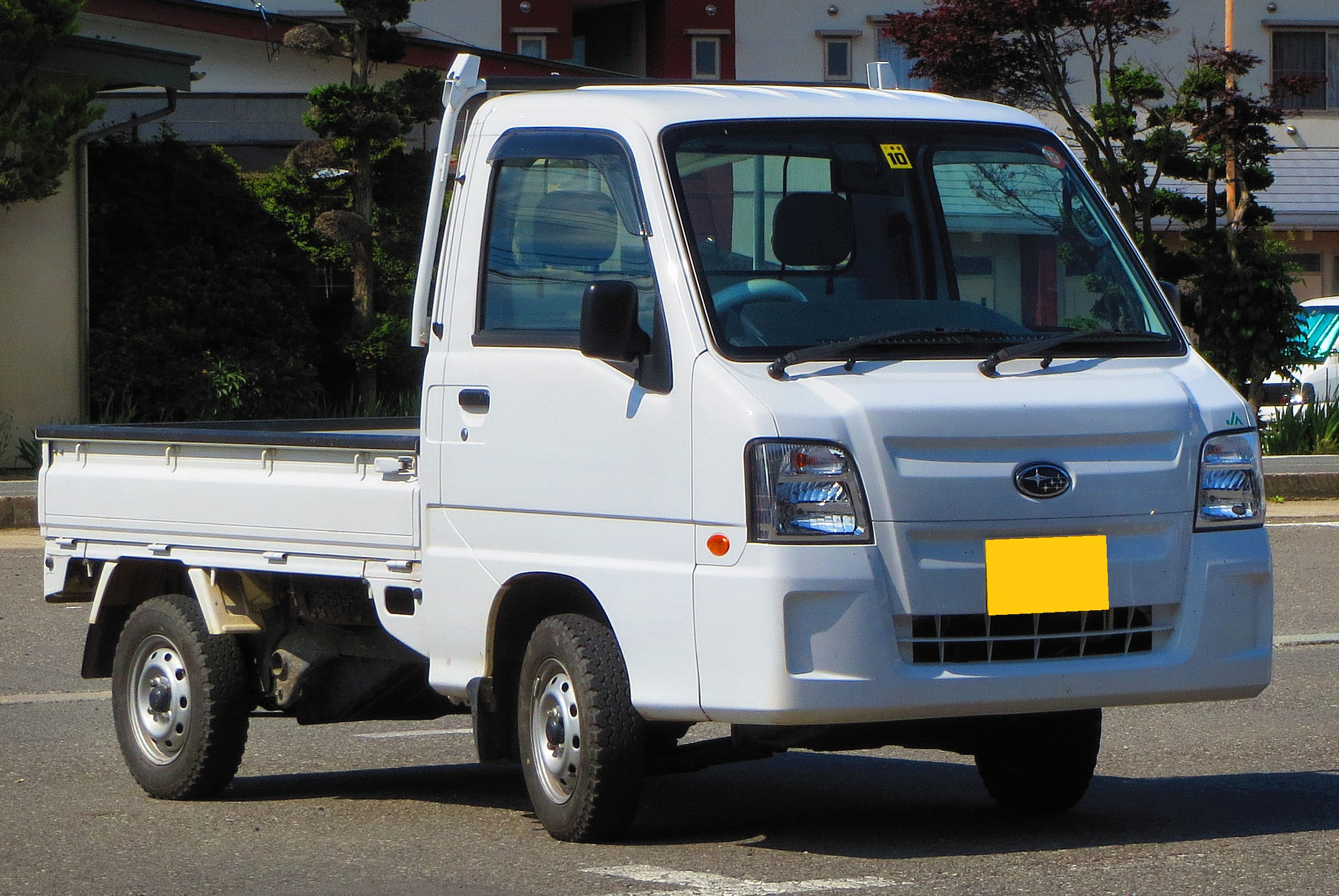
Third facelift model (2009-2012)

Dias Wagon/Sambar Dias Van

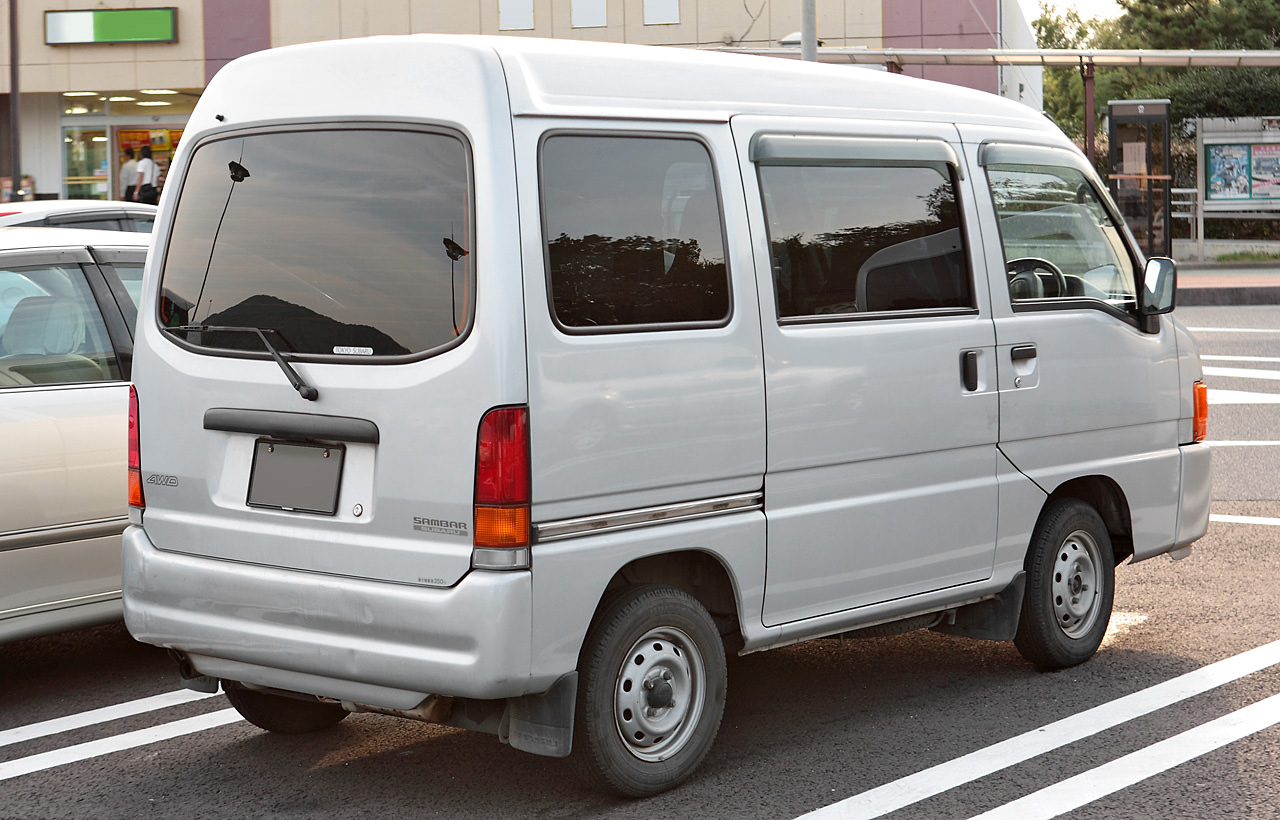
Rear view (pre-facelift 1999-2002)

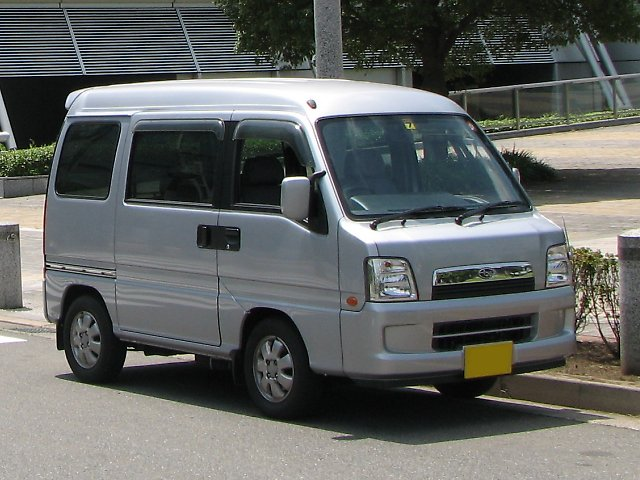
Sambar Dias (first facelift 2002-2005)

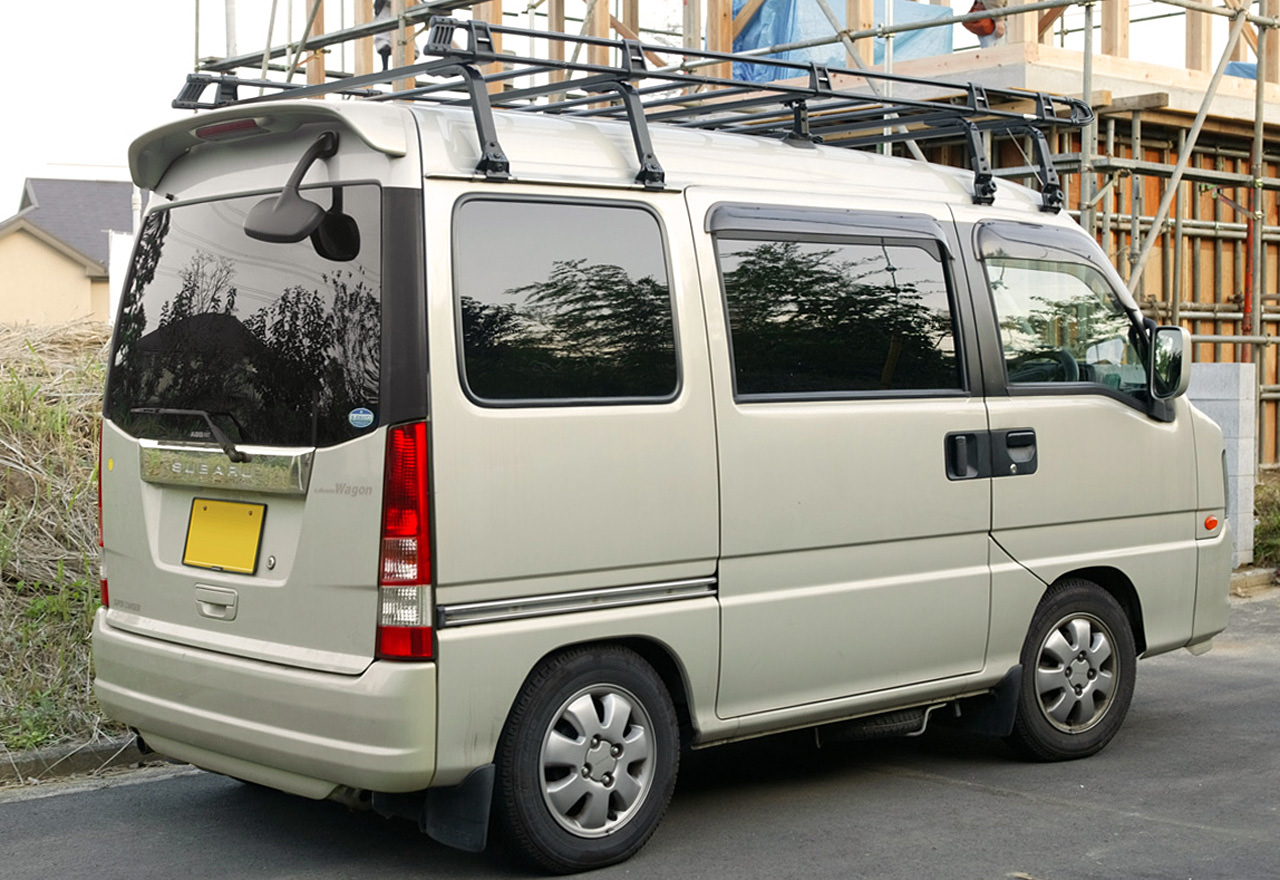
Dias Wagon (first facelift rear view 2002-2005)

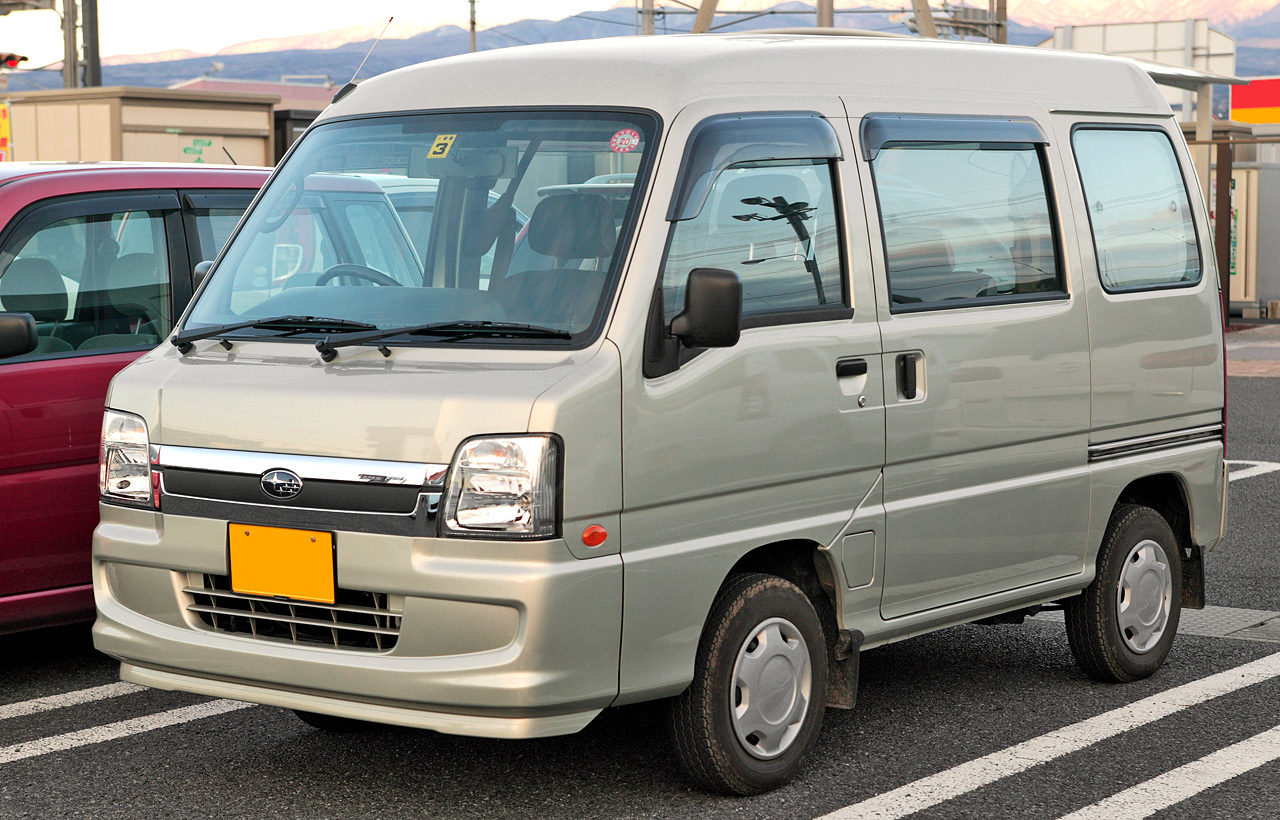
Sambar Dias (second facelift 2005-2009)

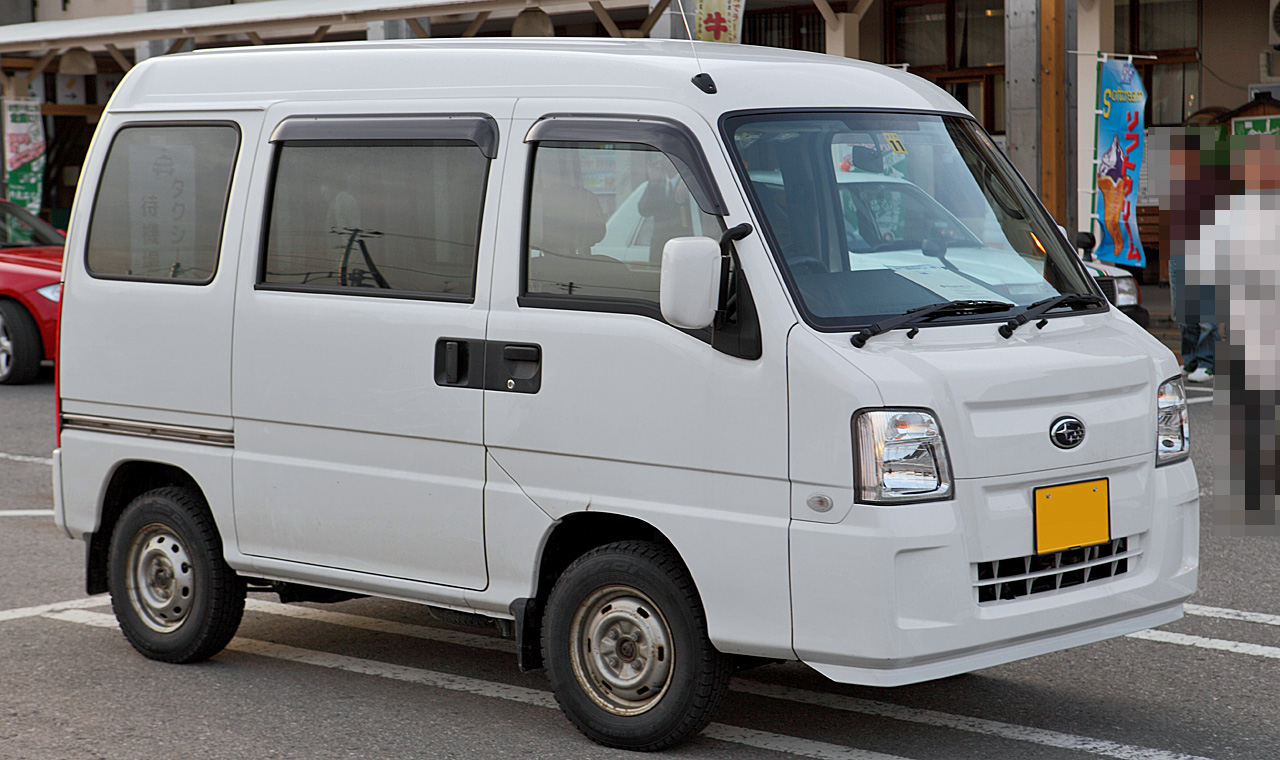
Sambar Dias (third facelift 2009-2012)

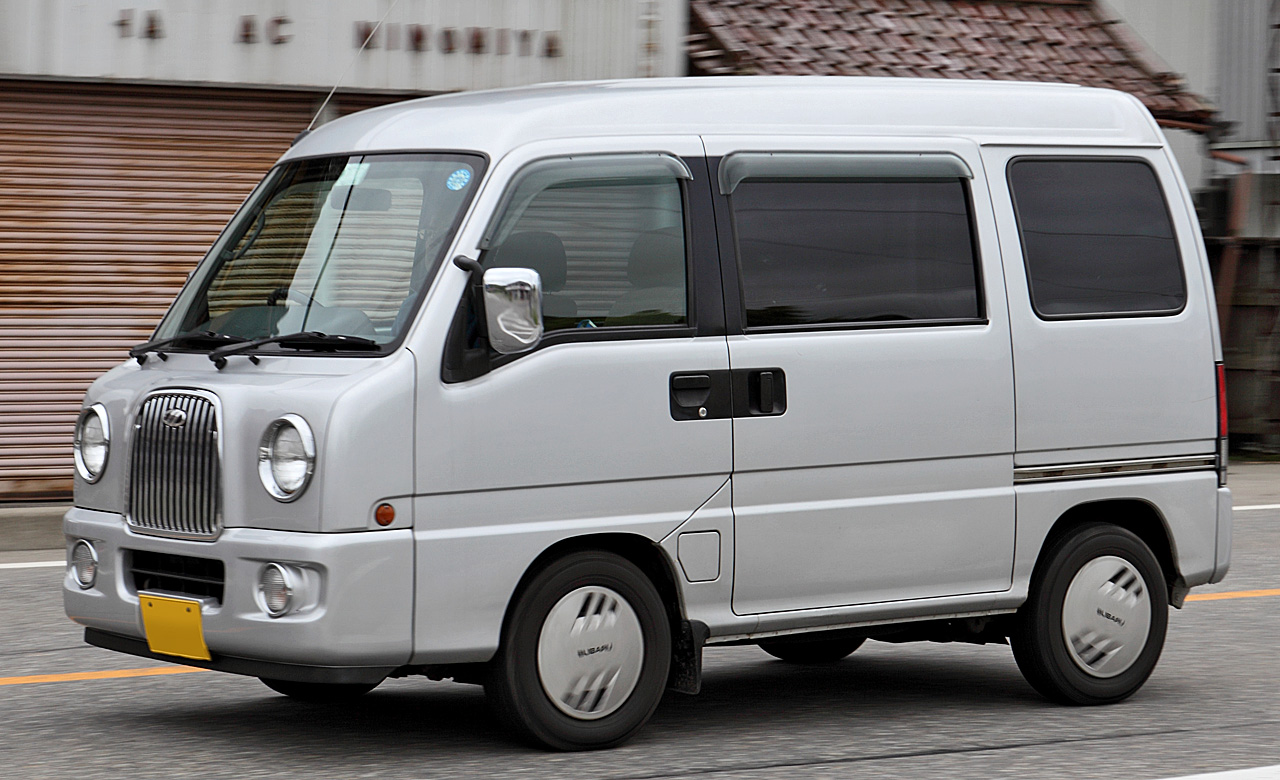
Dias Wagon Classic(1999-2002)

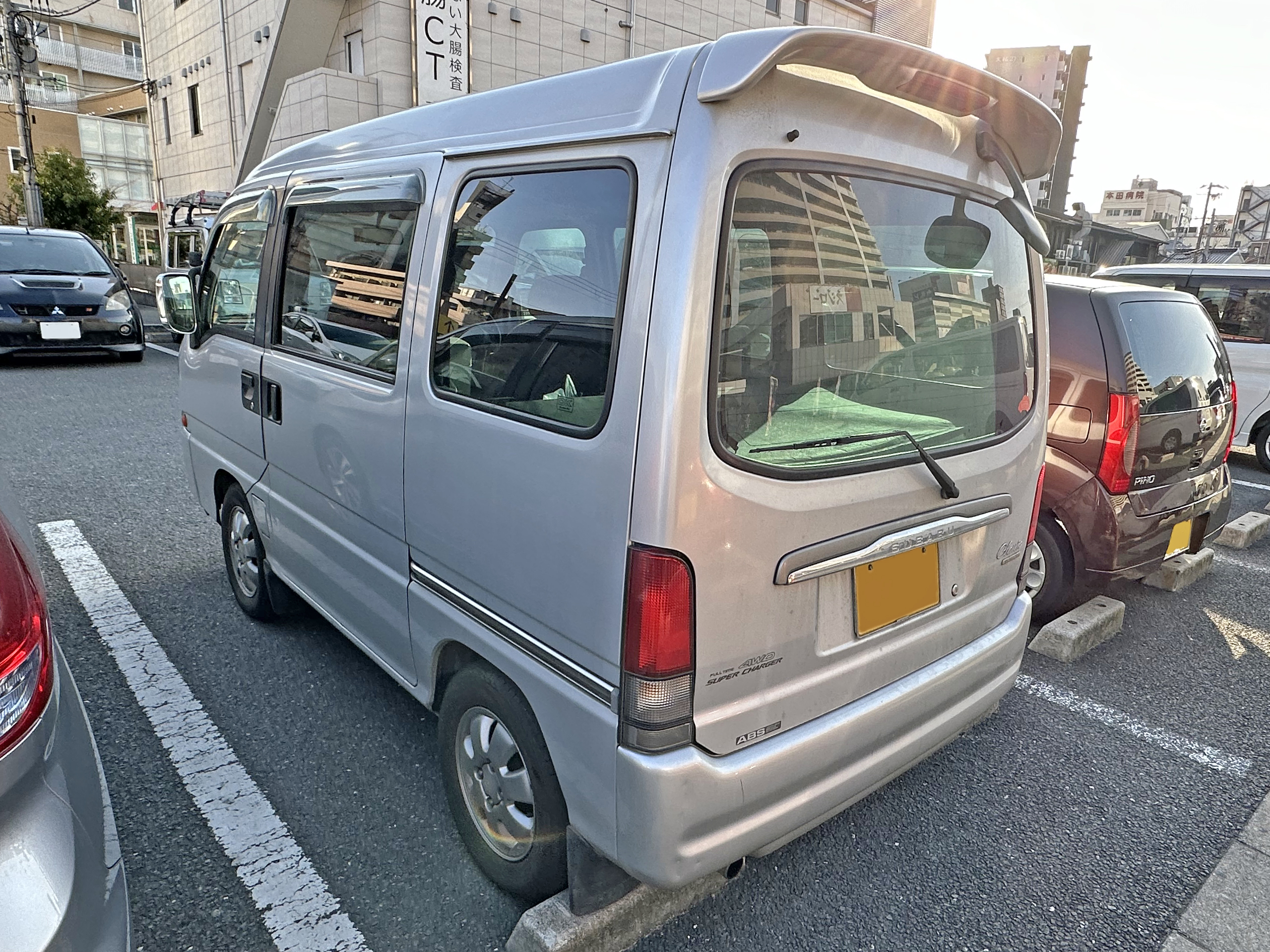
Dias Wagon Classic (rear view 1999-2002)

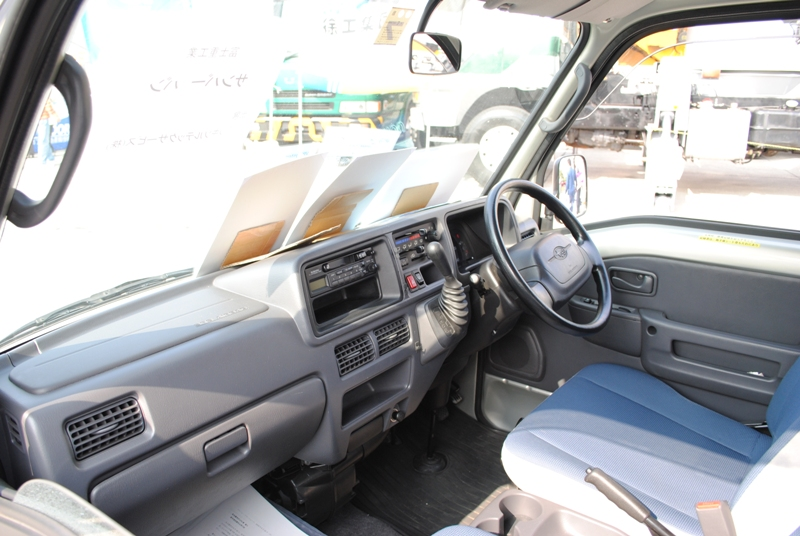
Interior

== Seventh generation (2012–2022) ==
In April 2008 Fuji Heavy Industries officially announced that they would gradually pull out of the kei class as a result of the recent investment by Toyota; Subaru was not to compete directly with Toyota which meant that the company's kei products would be replaced by rebadged models from Toyota's Daihatsu subsidiary. This allowed Subaru to focus on their core business of four-wheel-drive family cars with horizontally opposed engines with significant export sales; kei car sales are almost entirely limited to the domestic Japanese market and were not cost effective for such a small manufacturer. In spite of strong protests from Sambar fans, Subaru ended production of kei vehicles at the end of fiscal year 2011 (final day of production was 29 February, 2012).

In September 2009, the first result of the tie-up was introduced, the passenger-oriented Subaru Dias Wagon. This was a rebadged version of the Daihatsu Atrai, considered a member of the Sambar family. The seventh generation of the Sambar truck was later introduced to Japan on 2 April 2012 as a badge engineered Daihatsu Hijet Van/Truck. This is the first time the Sambar is a semi-cabover vehicle, the engine was installed in the front of the vehicle, between the front passengers, and driving the rear wheels, while continuing to offer on demand four-wheel-drive.

In 2014, the Sambar truck was discontinued and updated to S500 Hijet generation, following the Dias Wagon which was discontinued in early 2020. The Sambar van stayed on the S321 platform until January 2022.

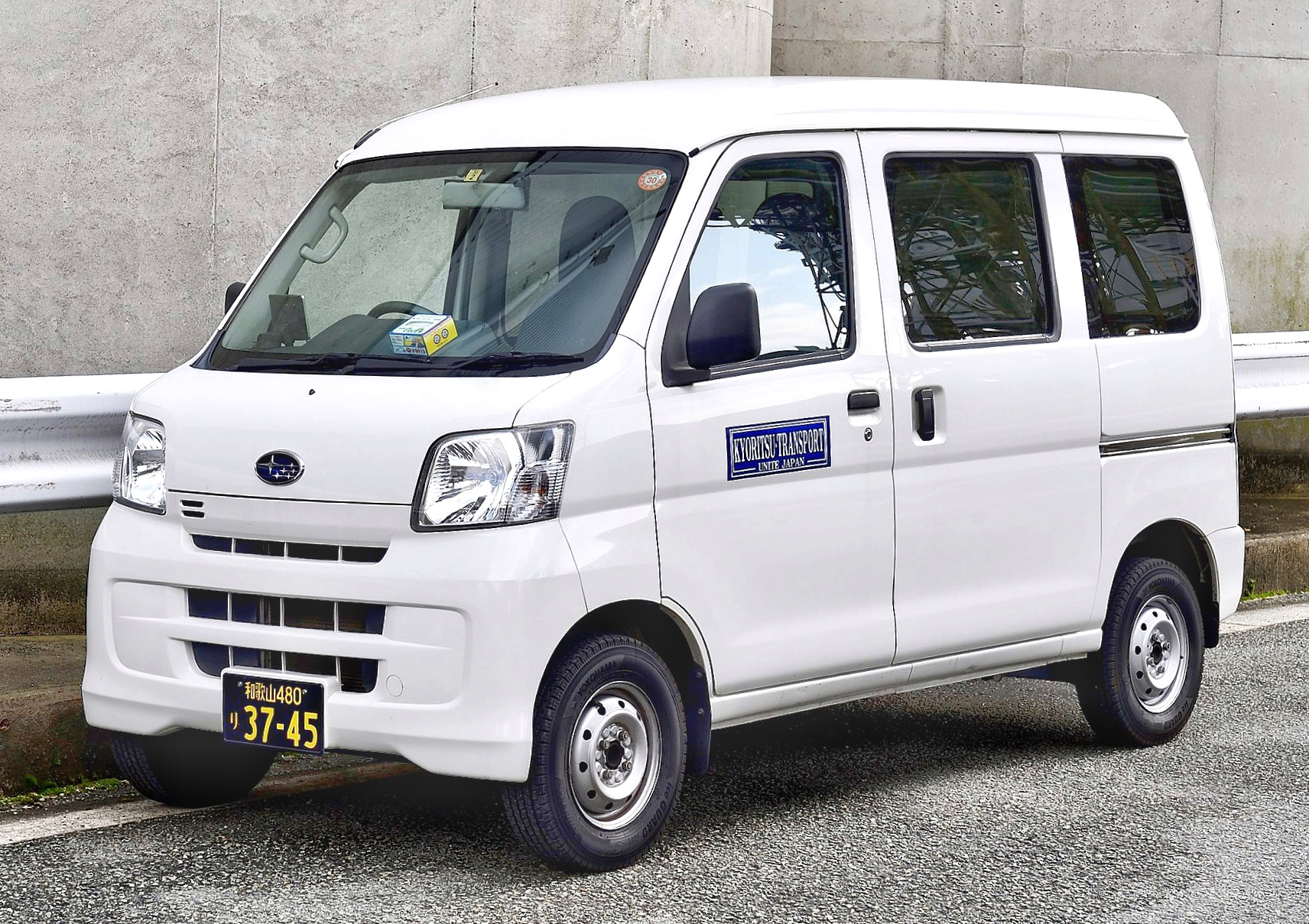
2012 Subaru Sambar van

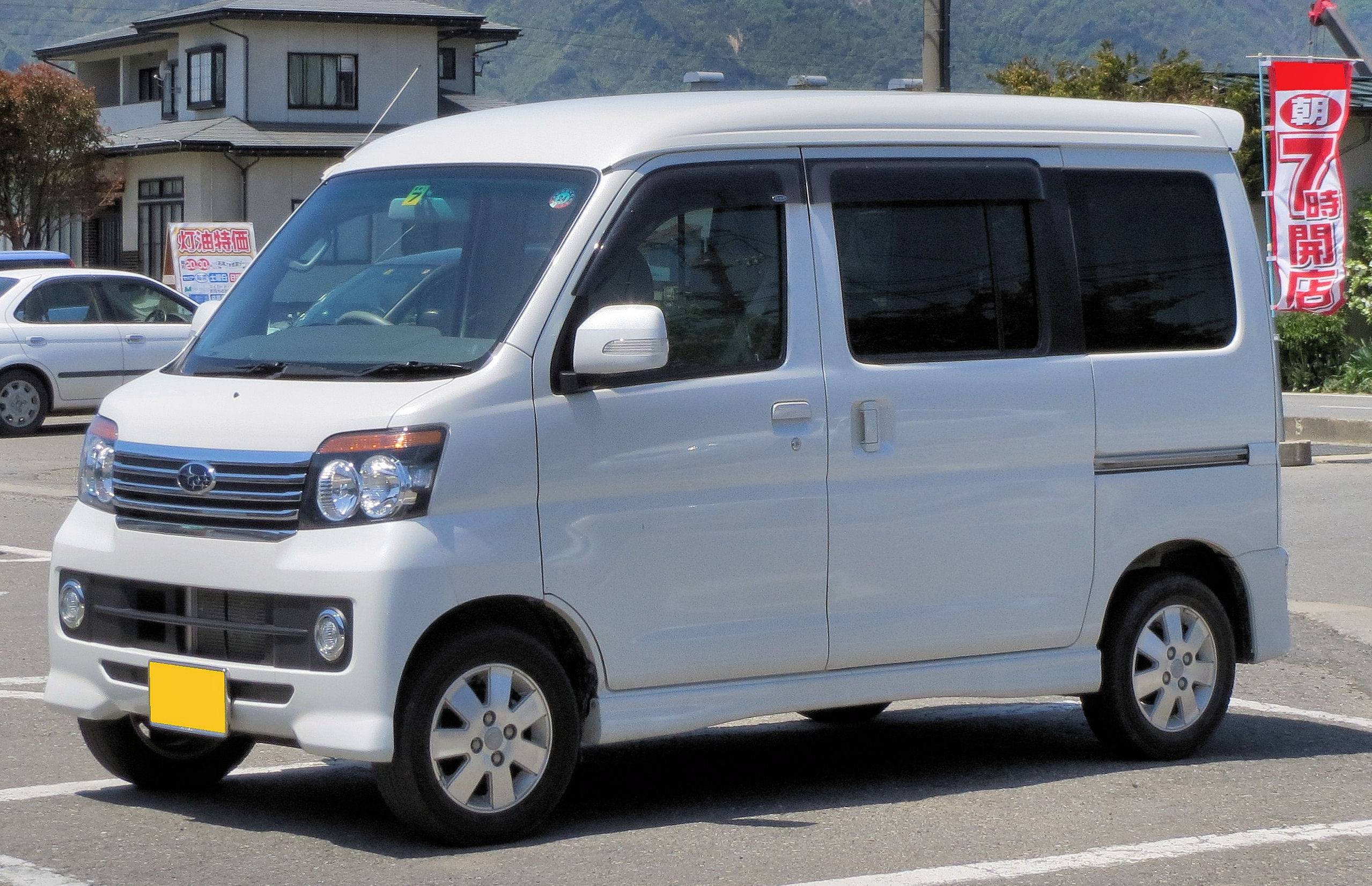
Subaru Dias Wagon RS Limited

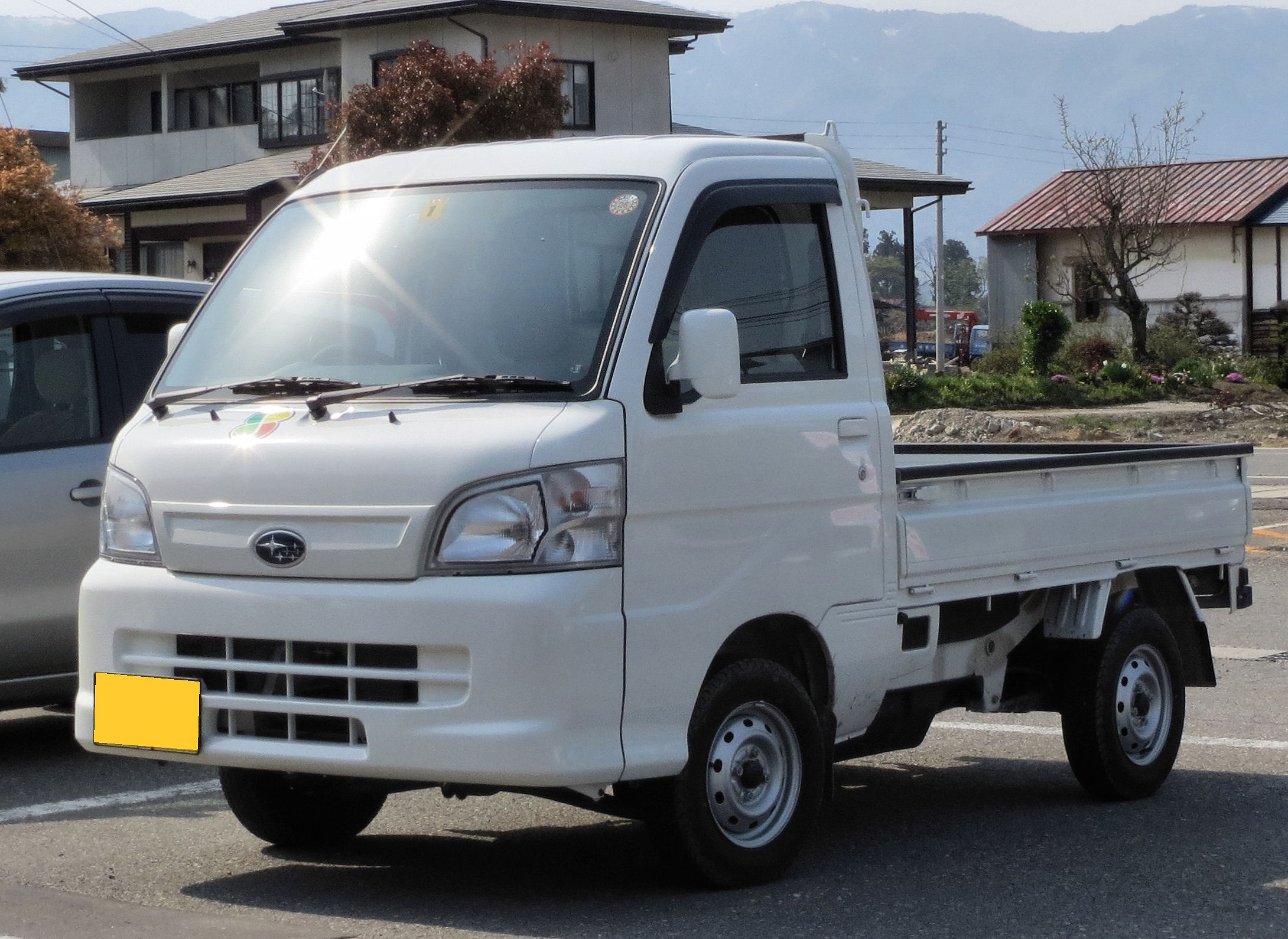
2012–2014 Subaru Sambar Truck TC

== Eighth generation (2014–present) ==
The eighth-generation Sambar Truck was introduced in Japan on 2 September 2014 as a rebadged tenth-generation Daihatsu Hijet Truck.

The eighth-generation Sambar Van was introduced in Japan in January 2022 as a rebadged eleventh-generation Daihatsu Hijet Cargo, which is built on the DNGA platform. The Dias Wagon passenger van which was discontinued in early 2020, was renamed to Sambar Dias.

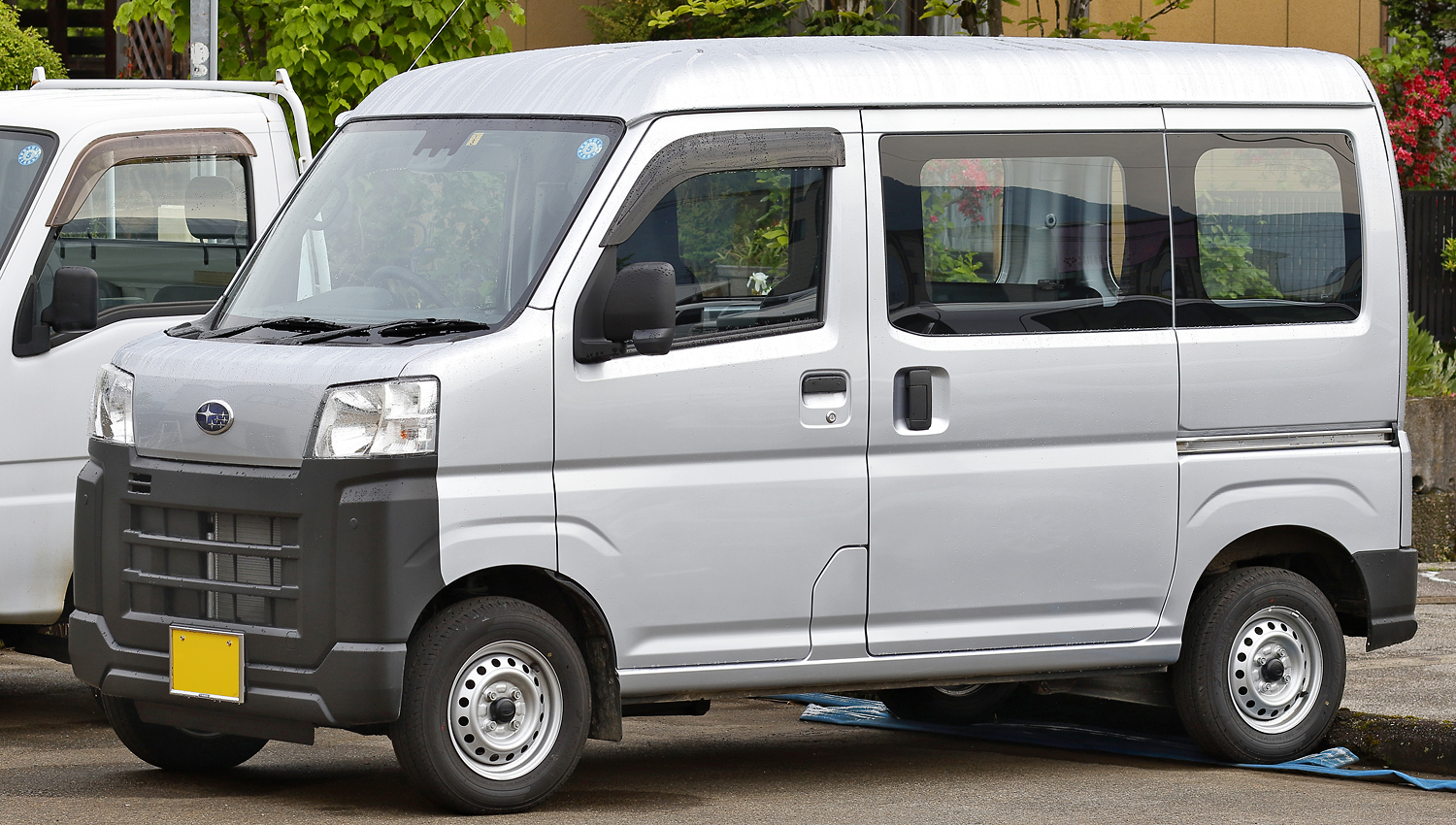
2022–present Subaru Sambar Van (S700)

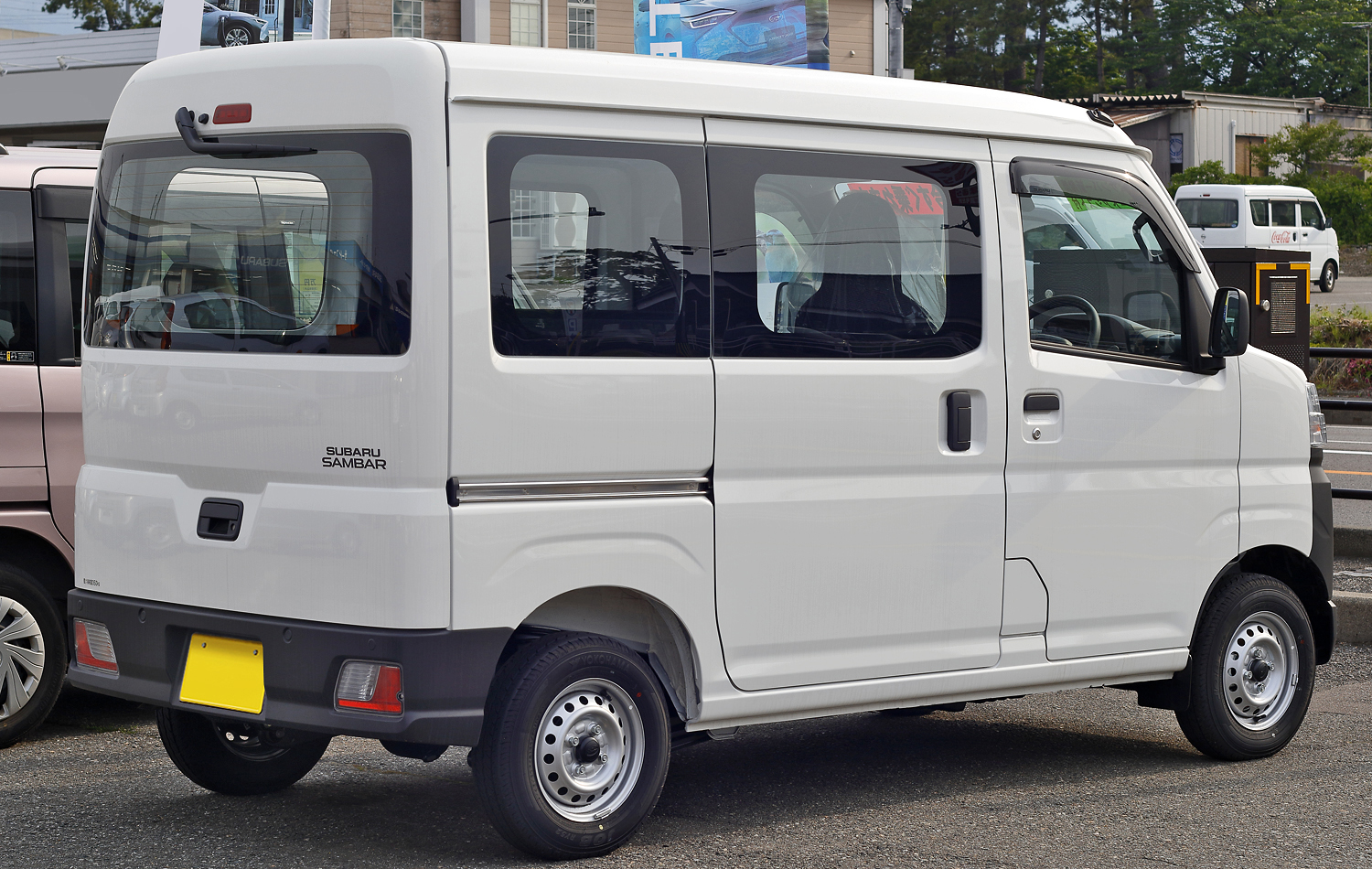
2022–present Subaru Sambar Van (S700)

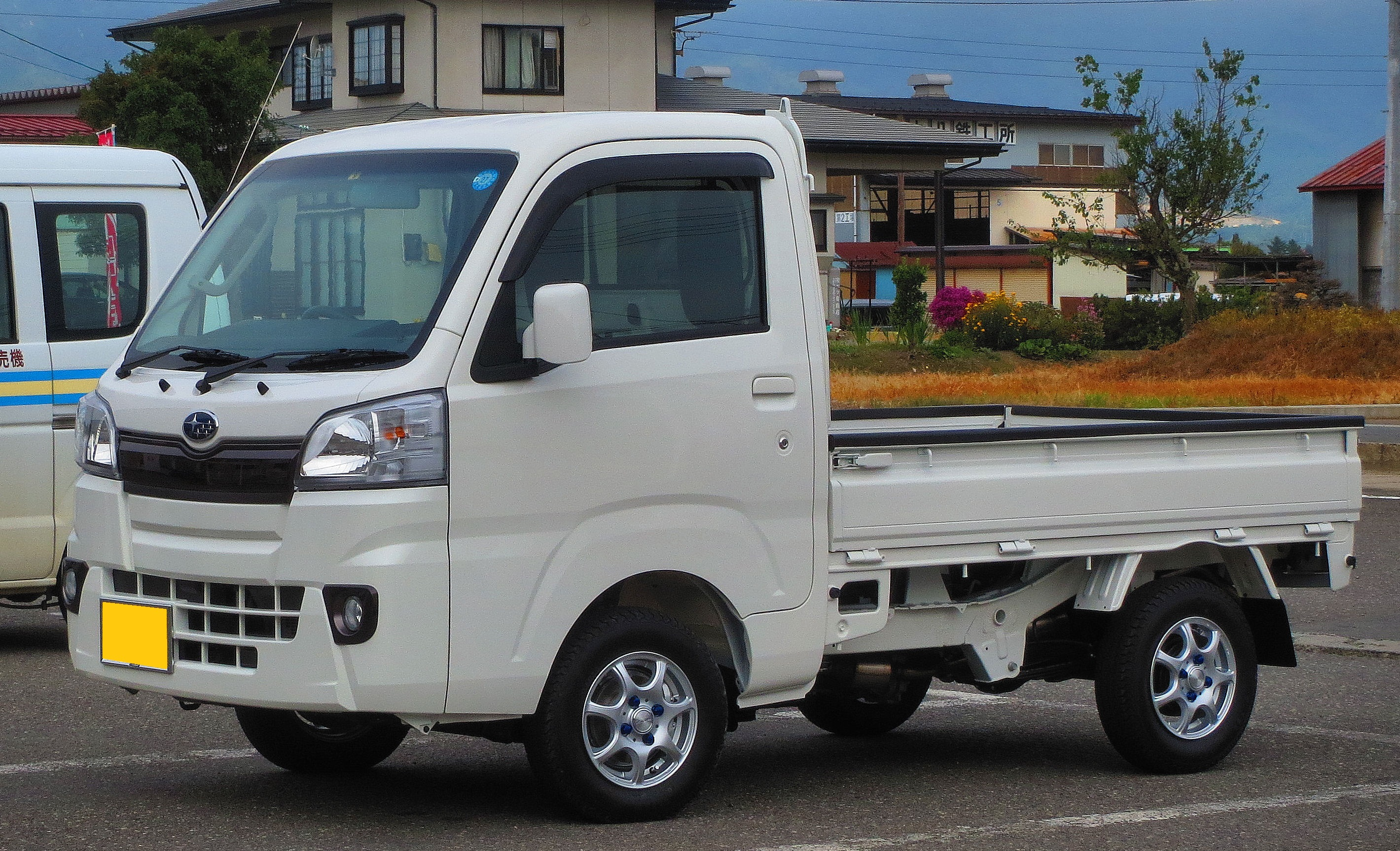
2014–2022 Subaru Sambar Truck TC AWD "Stylish Pack" (S510J)

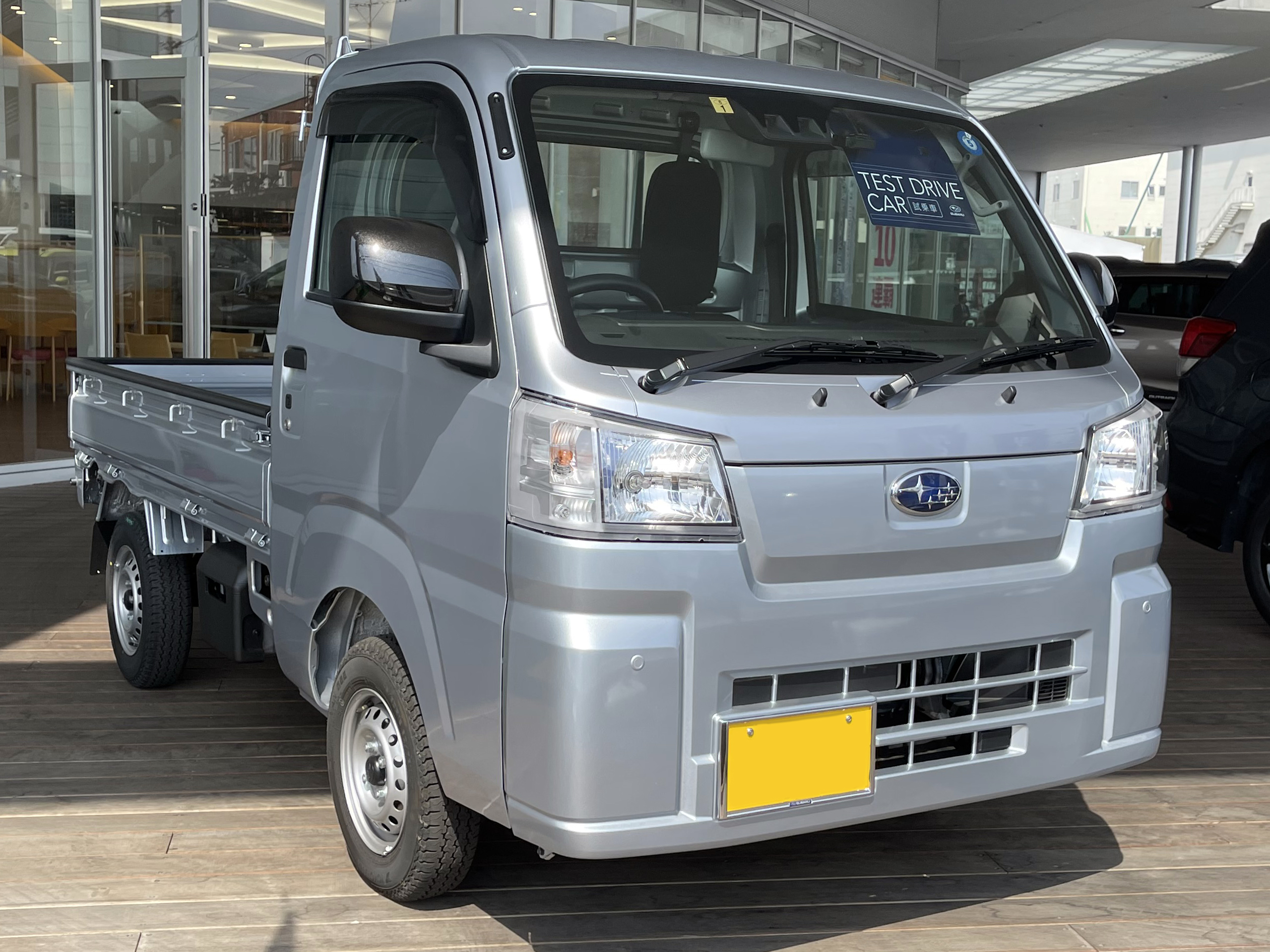
2022–present Subaru Sambar Truck TA (S510J)

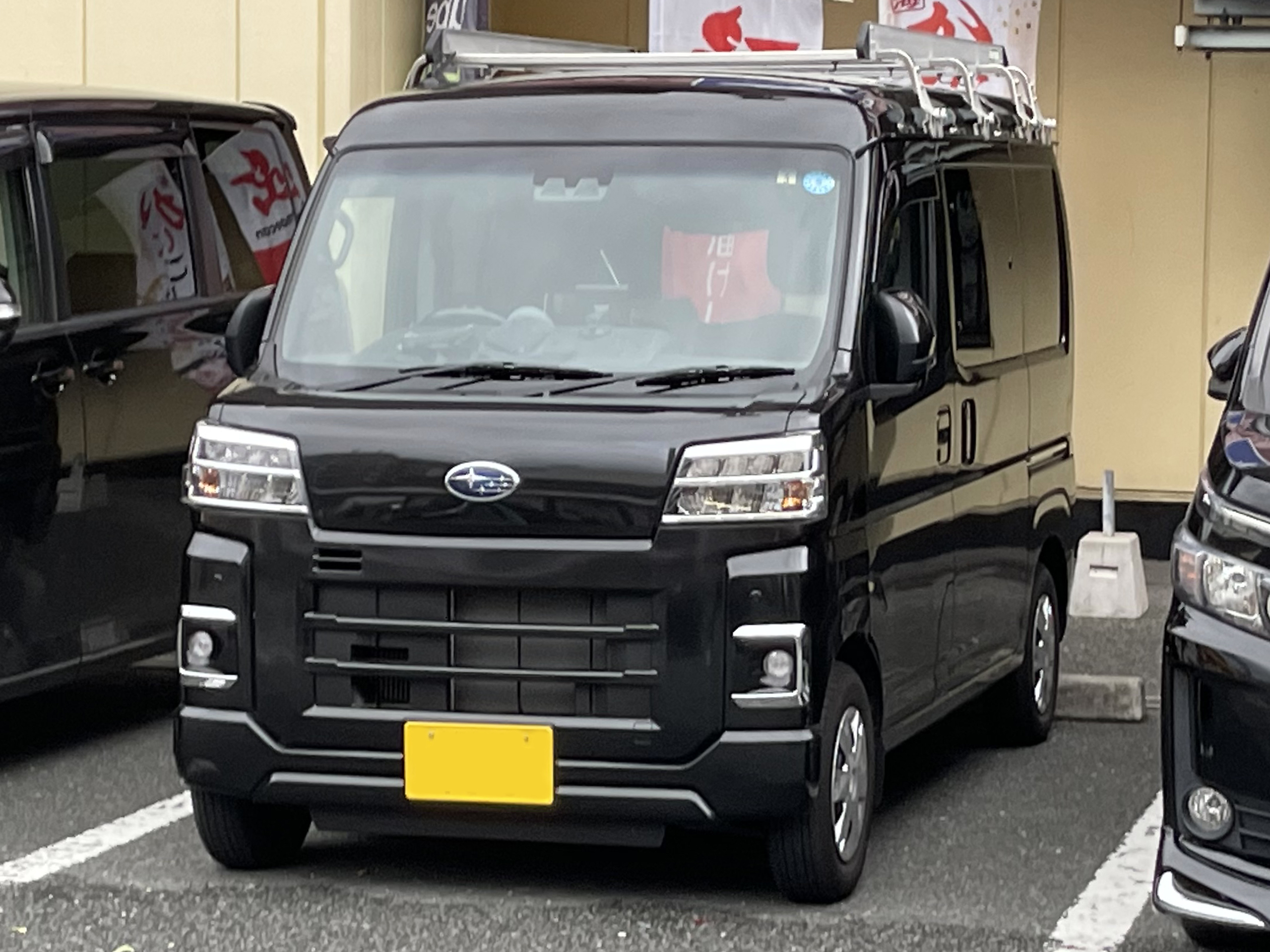
Sambar Van VC

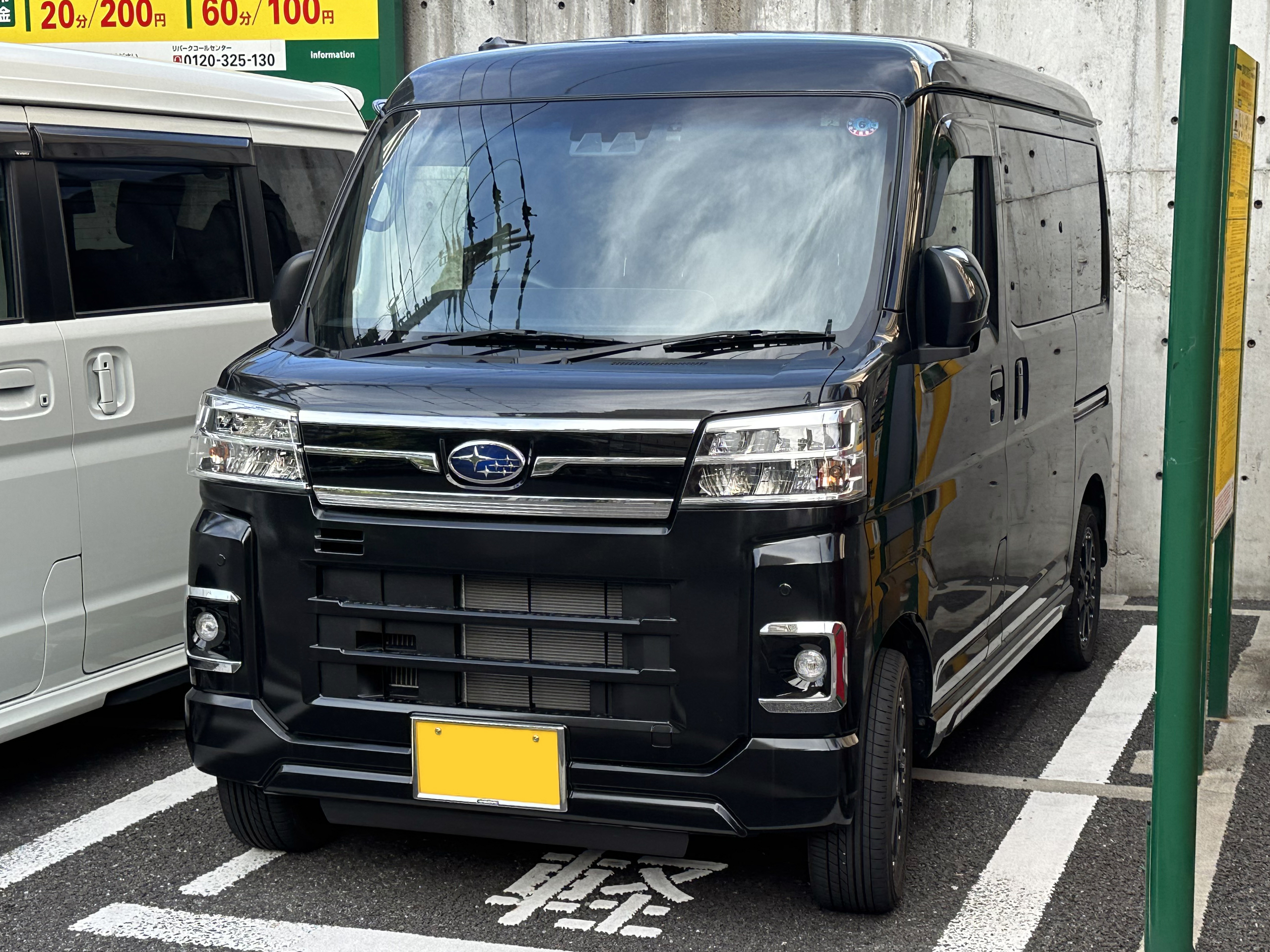
Sambar Dias

== Gallery ==
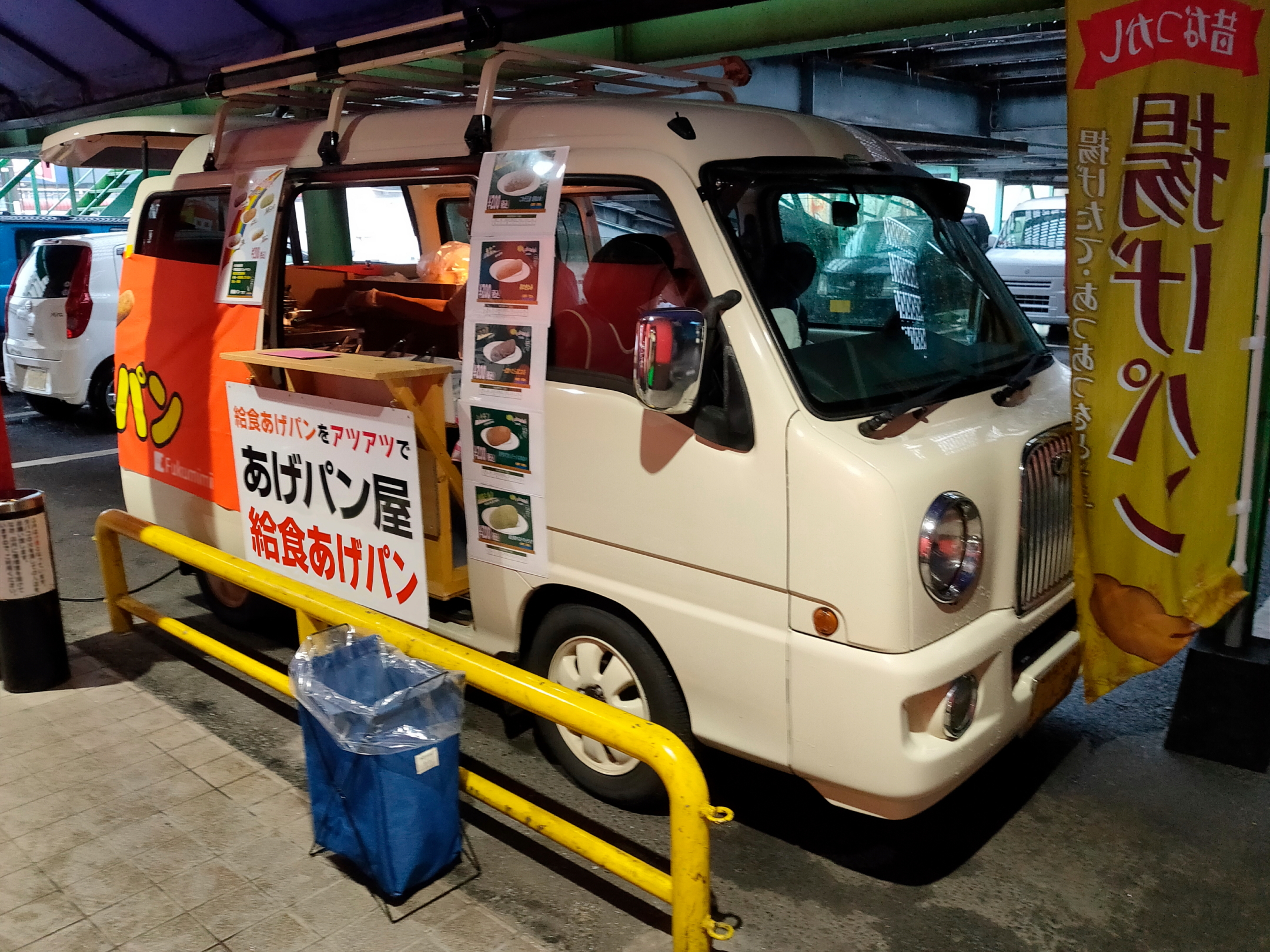
2000 Dias Wagon Classic (Food truck)

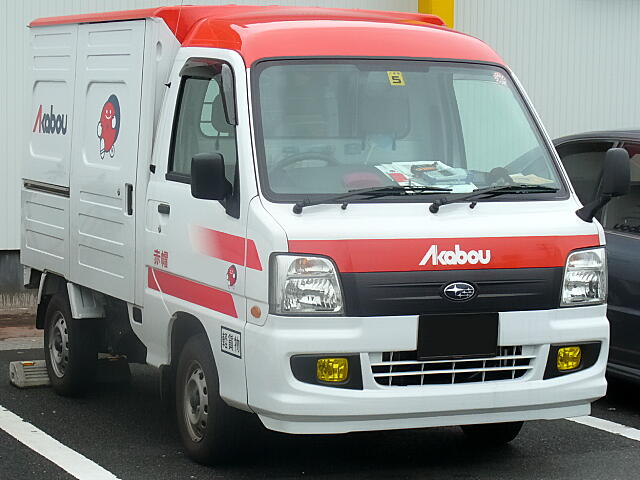
2005 Akabou Sambar

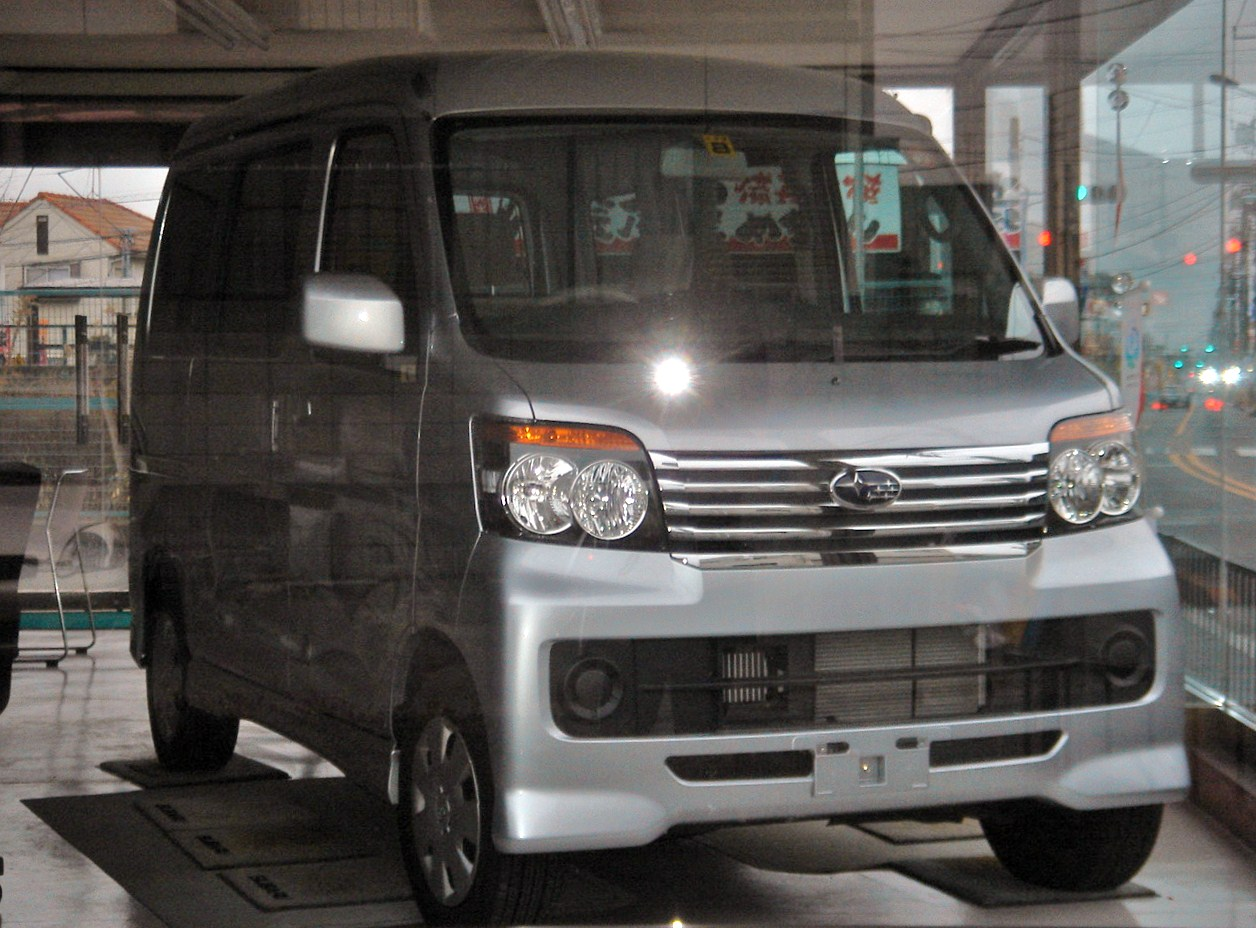
2010 Subaru Dias Wagon

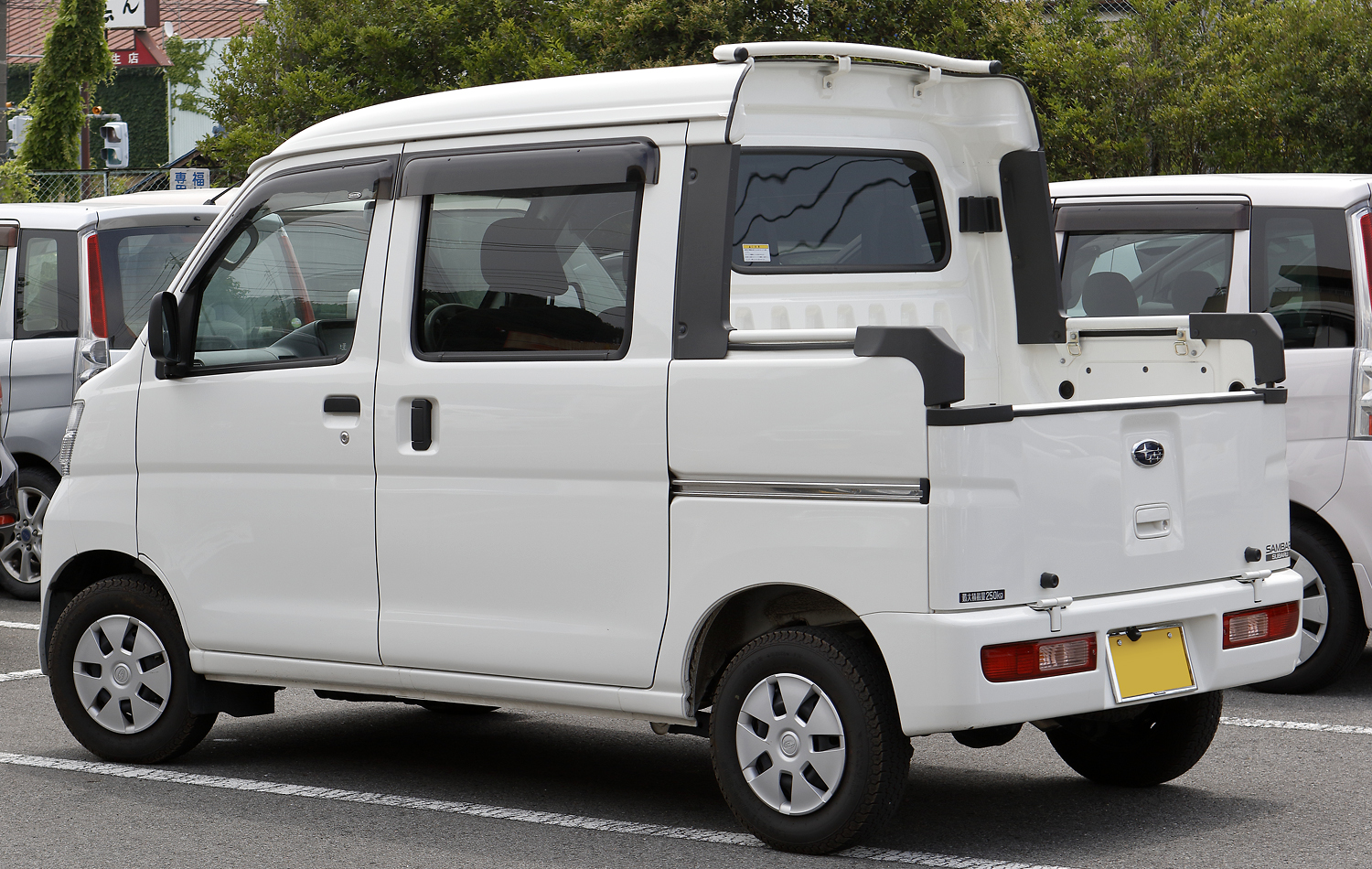
Sambar Open Deck

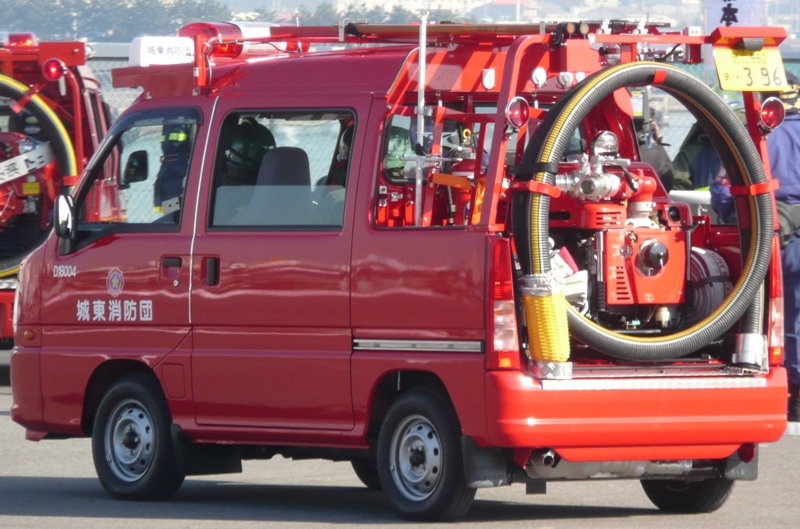
Sambar mini fire pump

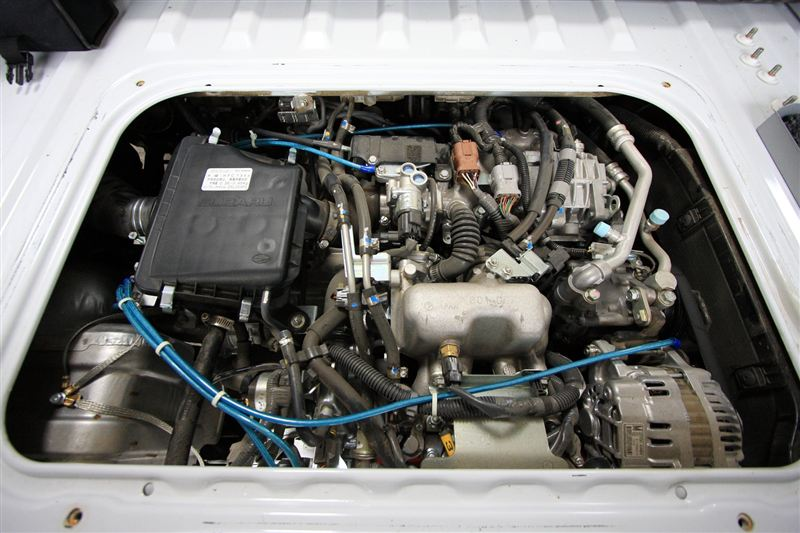
Supercharger
