= Stratus 2000 =

American aircraft engine manufacturer

Stratus 2000, Inc
- Company type: Privately held company
- Industry: Aerospace
- Founded: 1992 as Stratus, Inc.
- Founder: Reiner and Petra Hoffmann
- Defunct: circa 2008
- Fate: Out of business
- Headquarters: Corvallis, Oregon, United States
- Products: Aircraft engines
- Owner: Mykal Templeman

Stratus 2000, Inc was an American aircraft engine manufacturer based in Camano Island, Washington and later in Corvallis, Oregon. The company specialized in the design and manufacture of engines based on Subaru automotive engines for homebuilt aircraft.

The company was founded as Stratus, Inc. in 1992 by Reiner and Petra Hoffmann, and was sold in 1999 to Mykal Templeman and renamed Stratus 2000, Inc. The company seems to have gone out of business about 2008 and engine production ended.

The company built two Subaru-derived designs, the Stratus EA 81 based on the Subaru EA 81 automotive engine and the Stratus EJ 22 based upon the Subaru EJ 22 automotive engine. The company also designed its own 2.2:1 ratio propeller speed reduction unit to slow the crankshaft speeds down to those that can be used by aircraft propellers efficiently.

Some existing airframe designs, like the Zenith CH 601, have been adapted for the Stratus engines, while other aircraft have been designed around the engines from the start, such as the Airdale Backcountry. Stratus powerplants have also been used as retrofits in production aircraft, such as the Cessna 150.

== Aircraft ==
Summary of engines built by Stratus and Stratus 2000
Model name	First run	Type
Stratus EA 81	circa 1992	Four cylinder, liquid-cooled 100 hp (75 kW) engine based upon the Subaru EA 81 automotive engine
Stratus EJ 22	1990s	Four cylinder, liquid-cooled 180 hp (134 kW) engine based upon the Subaru EJ 22 automotive engine
