= Avid Flyer =

American family of aircraft

Flyer
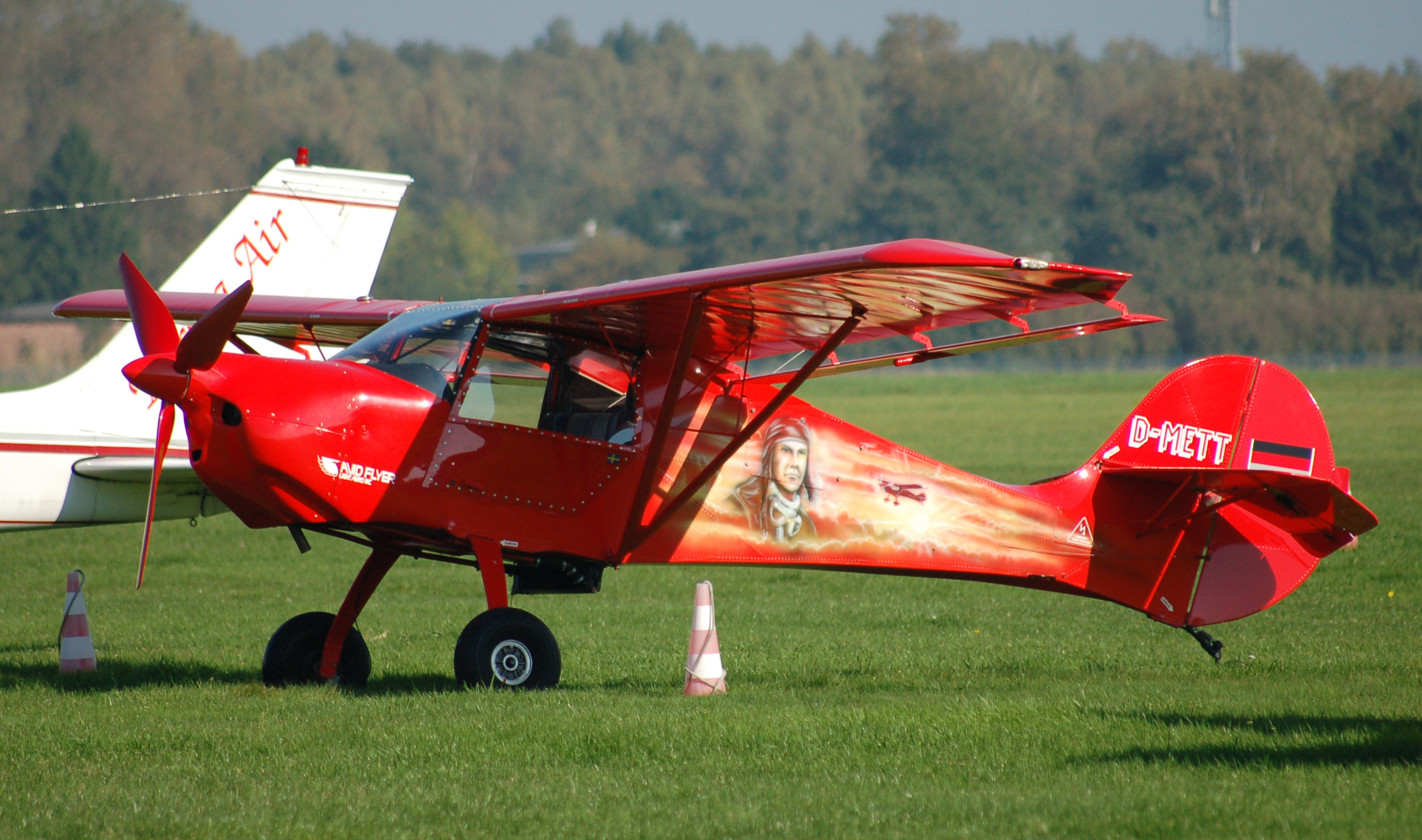
- Avid Flyer Mk.IV

General information
- Type: Two seat homebuilt aircraft
- National origin: United States
- Manufacturer: Light Aero
- Designer: Dean Wilson
- Number built: 2,000+ (Avid Flyer + Avid Magnum) kits by 2001

History
- First flight: 1983
- Developed into: Avid Champion; Avid Catalina; Airdale Backcountry

The Avid Flyer is a family of American single engine, high-wing, strut-braced, conventional landing gear-equipped, two seat light aircraft designed for kit construction in the 1980s. Its several variants sold in large numbers. In 1987 a Flyer became the first ultralight to land at the North Pole.

== Design and development ==
The kitbuilt two seat lightplane was designed by Dean Wilson in 1983, the first prototype flying in 1983 and appearing at Oshkosh that year. Kits were produced by Light Aero with several names (Bandit, Lite, Magnum and Mk.IV) with many options including two wing designs, the choice of tricycle, tailwheel, ski or float undercarriages, rescue parachutes and a variety of engines. Lite Aero production continued until the company went bankrupt in 1998. Avid Aircraft reappeared in 2003, but by 2010 the kits, including new variants, and components were produced by Airdale Flyer.

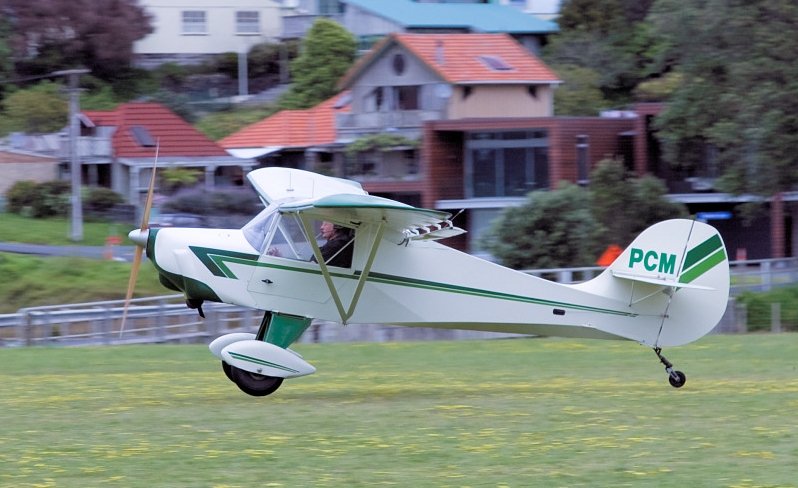
Avid Flyer Hi-Gross

The Avid Flyer is a conventional layout, single engine, side by side two seat light aircraft, with a strut-braced high wing configuration. Aluminum tubes serve as leading edge/main spar and rear spar, each wing being supported by a pair of tubular lift struts. Sawn plywood wing ribs are bonded to the aluminum tube spars using a filled epoxy compound. The Avid Flyer features Junkers style one-piece flaperons supported by three offset hinge arms. The Junkers design moves the control surfaces well underneath the wing, where they remain in undisturbed smooth airflow at low speed and/or higher climb angles.

The welded steel tube fuselage is flat sided, narrowing towards a braced cruciform tail group. The horizontal tailplane is carried on the fin just above the upper fuselage line. The aircraft's conventional rudder and elevator controls are cable operated.

Wilson's original intent developing the Avid Flyer was to offer an economical home-built aircraft to bridge the gap between conventional aircraft of the "Piper Cub" / "Taylorcraft" / "Aeronca" category and the minimalist ultralight aircraft such as the "Quicksilver" that had not yet matured into acceptable levels of reliability and safety in the early 1980s. The ability to fly from short, unimproved, and back-country strips was also one of Wilson's design priorities. Due to its light weight, good power-to-weight ratio, and design features such as the Junkers flaperons, the Avid Flyer excels in this type of environment and STOL operations. Recent developments in small aircraft engine design and reliability have brought the Avid Flyer well into the realm of being seen as a highly capable and economically viable choice for light sport use.

== Operational history ==
By about 2008, some 2,000 Flyer kits had been built over five continents. 346 Flyers and Magnums appear on the European (excluding Russian) civil registers. Perhaps the most remarkable flight was that made by Hubert de Chevigny in an Avid Lite 532 equipped with an additional 300 L (66 Imp gal, 79 US gal) fuel tank. Accompanied by Nicholas Hulot in an Aviasud Mistral, he left from Resolute, Canada on 2 April 1987, reaching the North Pole on 7 May in three stages. They were the first ultralights to do so.

== Variants ==
Flyer
Early versions with straight trailing edge rudder, foldable wings and either 45 hp (30 kW) Cayuna or 65 hp (49 kW) Rotax 532 engines.

Mk IV
Fuller, curved edge rudder and either a 64 hp (48 kW) Rotax 582 or a Rotax 912 engines. Baggage compartment added. Introduced 1992. The Mark IV was further developed into the Airdale Backcountry.
Bandit
Economy version with 50 hp (37 kW) Rotax 503.

Magnum
Heavier, powered by a 160 hp (119 kW) Lycoming O-320 or an engine in the 125 hp (93 kW) to 180 hp (134 kW) range.

== Specifications (Mk IV STOL) ==
Data from Simpson 2001

General characteristics

- Crew: one
- Capacity: one passenger
- Length: 17 ft 11 in (5.46 m)
- Wingspan: 29 ft 10 in (9.09 m)
- Height: 6 ft 1 in (1.85 m)
- Empty weight: 511 lb (232 kg)
- Max takeoff weight: 1,151 lb (522 kg)
- Powerplant: 1 × Rotax 582 two cylinder two stroke, water cooled, 65 hp (48 kW)
- Propellers: 2 blade-bladed

Performance

- Maximum speed: 105 mph (169 km/h, 91 kn)
- Cruise speed: 92 mph (148 km/h, 80 kn)
- Stall speed: 32 mph (51 km/h, 28 kn)
- Range: 340 mi (550 km, 300 nmi)
- Endurance: 5 hours
- Service ceiling: 16,000 ft (4,900 m)
- g limits: +6/-3
- Rate of climb: 1,000 ft/min (5.1 m/s) initial
- Maximum climb angle: 45°

== See also ==
Related development

- Denney Kitfox
- Flying K Sky Raider
- Rocky Mountain Wings Ridge Runner
