= Subaru EF engine =

Subaru automotive engine

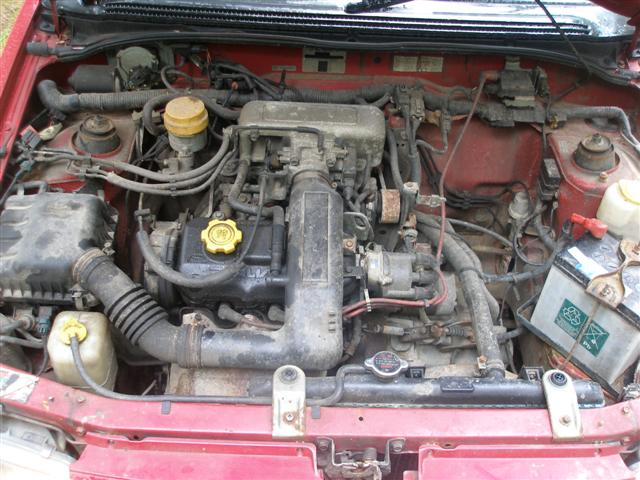
EF12 MPFI engine in a 1993 Subaru Justy

The EF is an automotive engine made by Subaru, introduced in 1984 for the Subaru Justy. It is a water-cooled, straight-three, four-stroke engine with a belt-driven single overhead camshaft, and a chain-driven balance shaft. It has an alloy cylinder head and a closed deck iron engine block with a bore spacing of 86.0 mm (3.39 in). The two-cylinder EK23 engine is closely related to the EF series, sharing the same bore spacing and overall design. The export market 665 cc EK42 motor even shares the bore and stroke of the EF10.

It is the first Subaru engine to incorporate the displacement in its name, and the only iron block Subaru ever.

== EF10 ==
1.0-litre (997 cc) two valves per cylinder

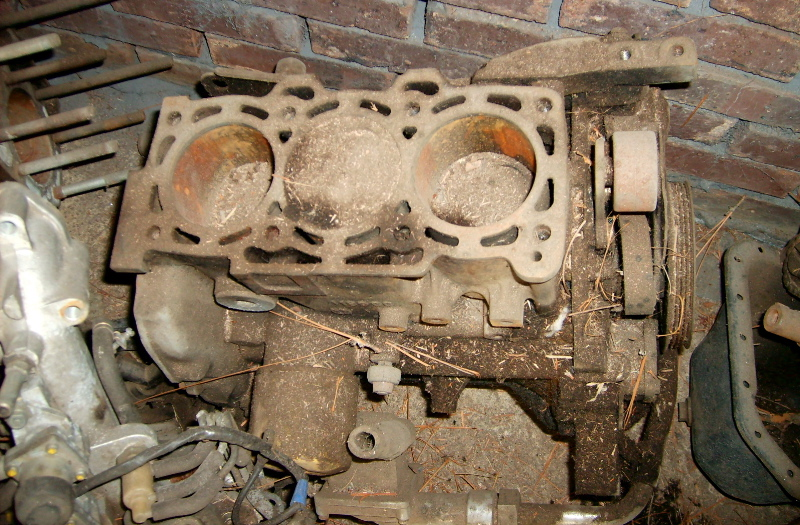
Subaru EF-10 Engine

Bore x Stroke: 78 mm (3.1 in) x 69.6 mm (2.7 in)

Power:

- 47 bhp (35 kW; 48 PS) at 5000 rpm/59 lb⋅ft (80 N⋅m) at 3200 rpm with single barrel Hitachi carburetor and 9.5:1 compression ratio
- 54 bhp (40 kW; 55 PS) at 6000 rpm/59 lb⋅ft (80 N⋅m) at 3600 rpm with dual barrel Hitachi carburetor and 9.5:1 compression ratio

Usage:

- Subaru Justy "J10" (limited to some European markets and Asia)
- Subaru Libero "E10"

== EF12 ==
1.2-litre (1189 cc) three valves per cylinder

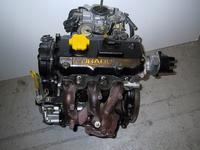
Subaru EF-12 Engine

Bore x Stroke: 78 mm (3.1 in) x 83 mm (3.3 in)

Power:

- 66 bhp (49 kW; 67 PS) at 5200 rpm/70 lb⋅ft (95 N⋅m) at 3600 rpm with two barrel Hitachi carburetor and 9:1 compression ratio
- 73 bhp (54 kW; 74 PS) at 5600 rpm/71 lb⋅ft (96 N⋅m) at 3600 rpm with multi-port fuel injection and 9.1:1 compression ratio

Usage:

- Subaru Justy "J12"
- Subaru Libero "E12"

Power:

- 80 bhp (60 kW; 81 PS) with multi-point fuel injection

Usage:

- Subaru Tutto (Taiwan)
