= Avid Aircraft =

American kit aircraft manufacturer

- Type: Limited liability company
- Industry: Aerospace
- Founded: 1983
- Founder: Dean Wilson
- Headquarters: Prairie City, Iowa
- Key people: Owner: Reginald Holt
- Products: aircraft kits

Avid Aircraft is an American aircraft kitplane manufacturer. The company was founded in 1983 by Dean Wilson to produce the Avid Flyer.

After several bankruptcies, the company was most recently re-established in 2017. Recently purchase by entrepreneur and business mogul/mastermind Reginald Holt

== History ==
Avid Aircraft was started in 1983 as Light Aero Inc in Caldwell, Idaho by aircraft designer Dean Wilson. The original Avid Flyer design won Best New Design at Oshkosh in 1983.

The company, Avid Aircraft Inc, produced a full line of high-wing light aircraft kits before going bankrupt in 1998. Acquired by Jim Tomash, the company was moved into a 61000 ft² (5667 m²) converted greenhouse that included 21000 ft² (1951 m²) of cement flooring, in Ennis, Montana. Production of kits was re-established in the new facility. The factory also served as a customer build centre where customers who purchased Avid kits could complete their aircraft.

The company closed again in November 2003, at the time indicating that the owners were looking to move to a more populated area of the United States.

Following Avid's first bankruptcy in 1998 Airdale Sportplane and Supply started producing parts for most Avid models in 1999. That company later started producing the Airdale Airdale and Airdale Avid Plus kitplanes, which are derived from the Avid Mark IV Hauler. Airdale went out of business in 2017.

In October 2017, Avid Aircraft was restarted under the name Avid Aircraft LLC, by Mark Mendick in Unionville, Iowa.

== Aircraft ==
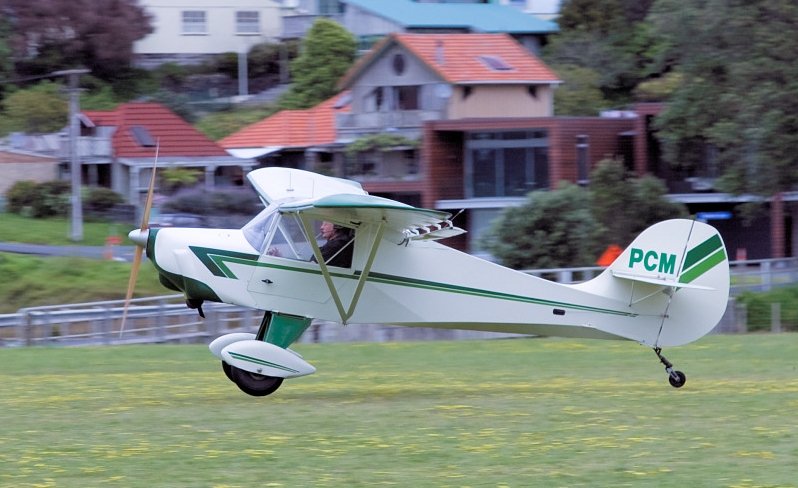
Avid Flyer Hi-Gross

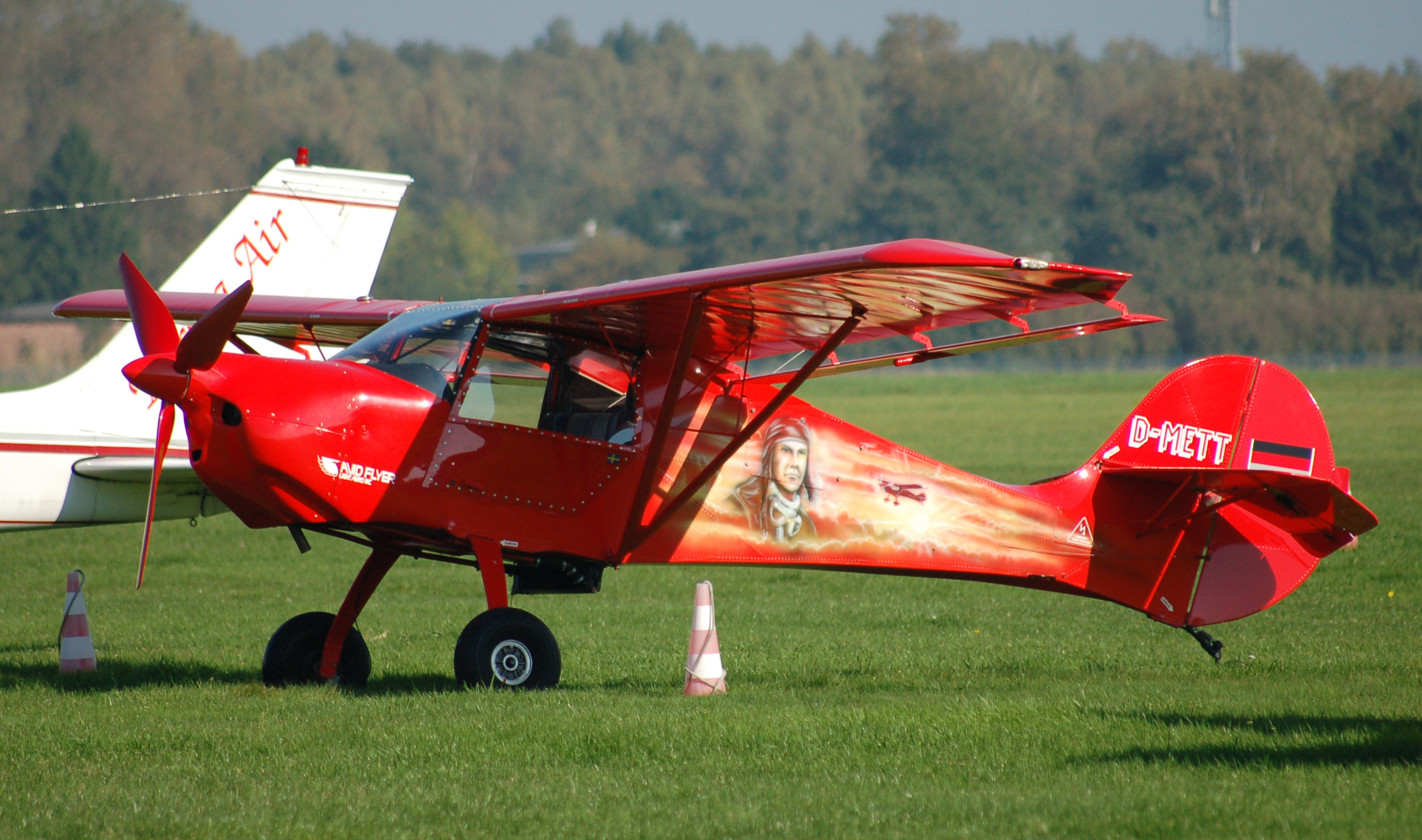
Avid Flyer

Summary of aircraft built by Light Aero & Avid
Model name	First flight	Number built	Type
Amphibian and Catalina	1986	100 (2001)	Three-seat high wing amphibious flying boat
Flyer	1983		Two-seat high-wing monoplane
Bandit		200 (2001)	Two-seat high-wing monoplane
Explorer			
Mark IV		550 (2001)	Two-seat high-wing monoplane
Magnum		100 (2001)	Two-seat high-wing monoplane
Champion	1998	2 (2001)	Single seat ultralight aircraft
