= Stratus EJ 22 =

American aircraft engine

EJ 22
- Type: Aircraft engine
- National origin: United States
- Manufacturer: Stratus 2000, Inc
- Developed from: Subaru EJ 22

The Stratus EJ 22 is an American aircraft engine, produced by Stratus 2000 of Corvallis, Oregon for use in homebuilt aircraft.

== Design and development ==
The engine is based upon the Subaru EJ 22 automotive engine. It is a four-cylinder four-stroke, 2,200 cc (134.3 cu in), liquid-cooled, gasoline engine design, with a belt-type reduction drive with a reduction ratio of 2.2:1. It employs electronic ignition and produces 180 hp (134 kW) at 5900 rpm.

The company seems to have gone out of business about 2008 and production ended.

== Specifications (EJ 22) ==
Data from World Directory of Leisure Aviation 2011-12

=== General characteristics ===
- Type: Four-cylinder, four stroke aircraft engine
- Bore: 96.9 mm (3.8 in)
- Stroke: 75 mm (3.0 in)
- Displacement: 2,200 cc (134.3 cu in)
- Dry weight: 120 kg (264.6 lb)

=== Components ===
- Fuel type: gasoline
- Cooling system: liquid
- Reduction gear: belt-type reduction drive, reduction ratio 2.2:1

=== Performance ===
- Power output: 180 hp (134 kW) at 5900 rpm
- Compression ratio: 9:1

== See also ==
- Stratus EA 81

Related lists

- List of aircraft engines
