= Stratus EA 81 =

American aircraft engine

EA 81
- Type: Aircraft engine
- National origin: United States
- Manufacturer: Stratus 2000, Inc
- Major applications: Airdale Backcountry; Zenith CH 601

The Stratus EA 81 is an American aircraft engine, produced by Stratus 2000 of Corvallis, Oregon, for use in homebuilt aircraft.

== Design and development ==
The engine is based on the Subaru EA 81 automotive engine. It is a four-cylinder, four-stroke, 1,800 cc (109.8 cu in), liquid-cooled, gasoline engine design with a belt-type reduction drive with a reduction ratio of 2.2:1. It employs electronic ignition and produces 100 hp (75 kW) at 5400 rpm.

The company seems to have gone out of business in 2008, and production ended.

== Applications ==
- Airdale Backcountry
- Cessna 150
- Zenith CH 601

== Specifications (EA 81) ==
Data from World Directory of Leisure Aviation 2011-12

=== General characteristics ===
- Type: Four-cylinder, four stroke aircraft engine
- Bore: 92 mm (3.6 in)
- Stroke: 67 mm (2.6 in)
- Displacement: 1,800 cc (109.8 cu in)
- Length: 660 mm (26.0 in)
- Width: 533 mm (21.0 in)
- Height: 444 mm (17.5 in)
- Dry weight: 84 kg (185.2 lb)

=== Components ===
- Fuel type: gasoline
- Cooling system: liquid
- Reduction gear: belt-type reduction drive, reduction ratio 2.2:1

=== Performance ===
- Power output: 100 hp (75 kW) at 5400 rpm
- Compression ratio: 9:1

== See also ==
- Stratus EJ 22

Related lists

- List of aircraft engines
