= Ta Ching Motor Co. =

Historical Taiwanese automotive manufacturer

Ta Ching Motor Co. 大慶汽車工業股份有限公司
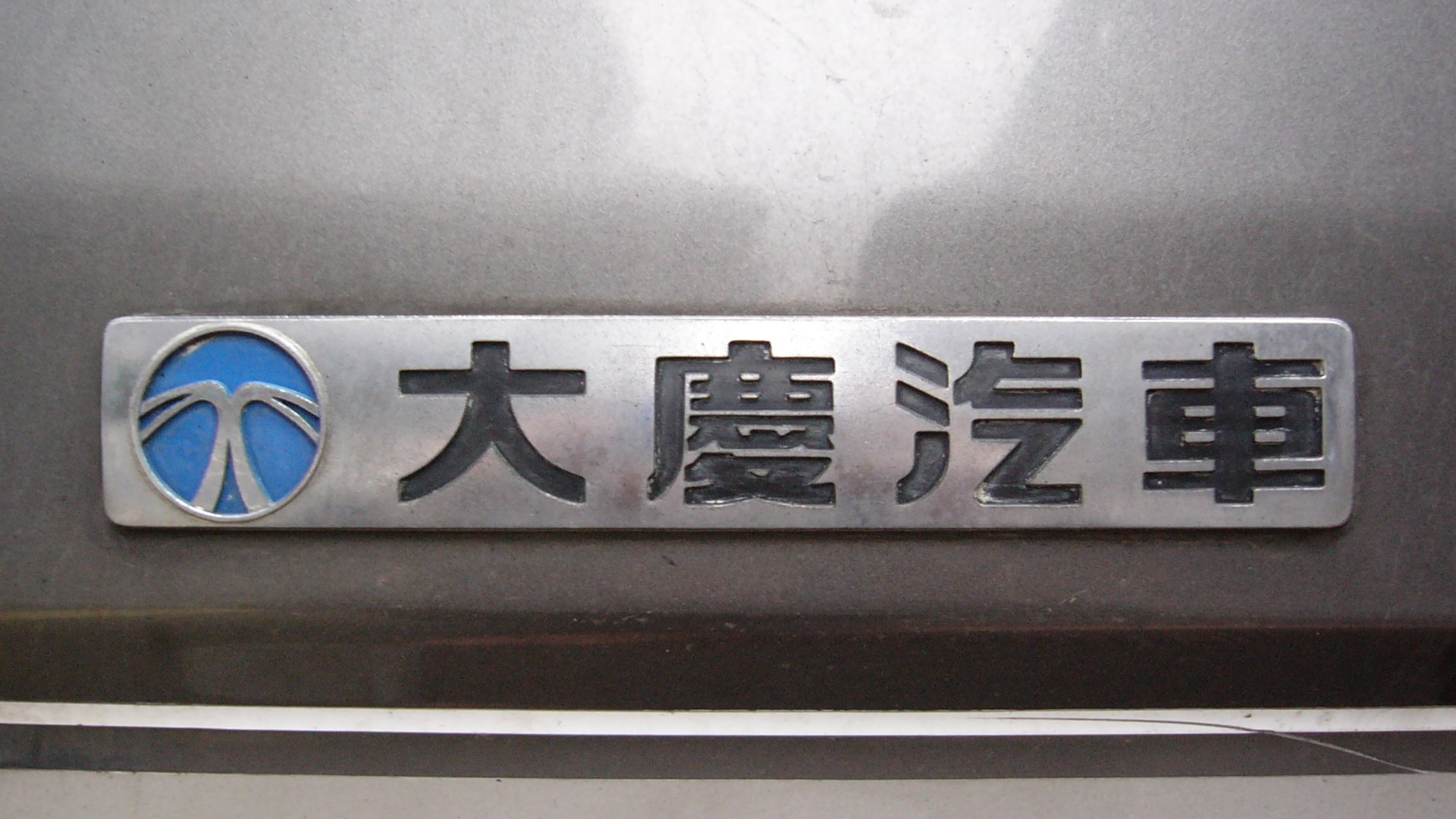
- Company type: Private Company
- Industry: Automotive Production
- Founded: 26 November 1986
- Defunct: 2002
- Headquarters: 335, Daxi Rd, Pingtung City, Pingtung County, Taiwan 900
- Area served: Taiwan
- Website: www.tcmc.fr

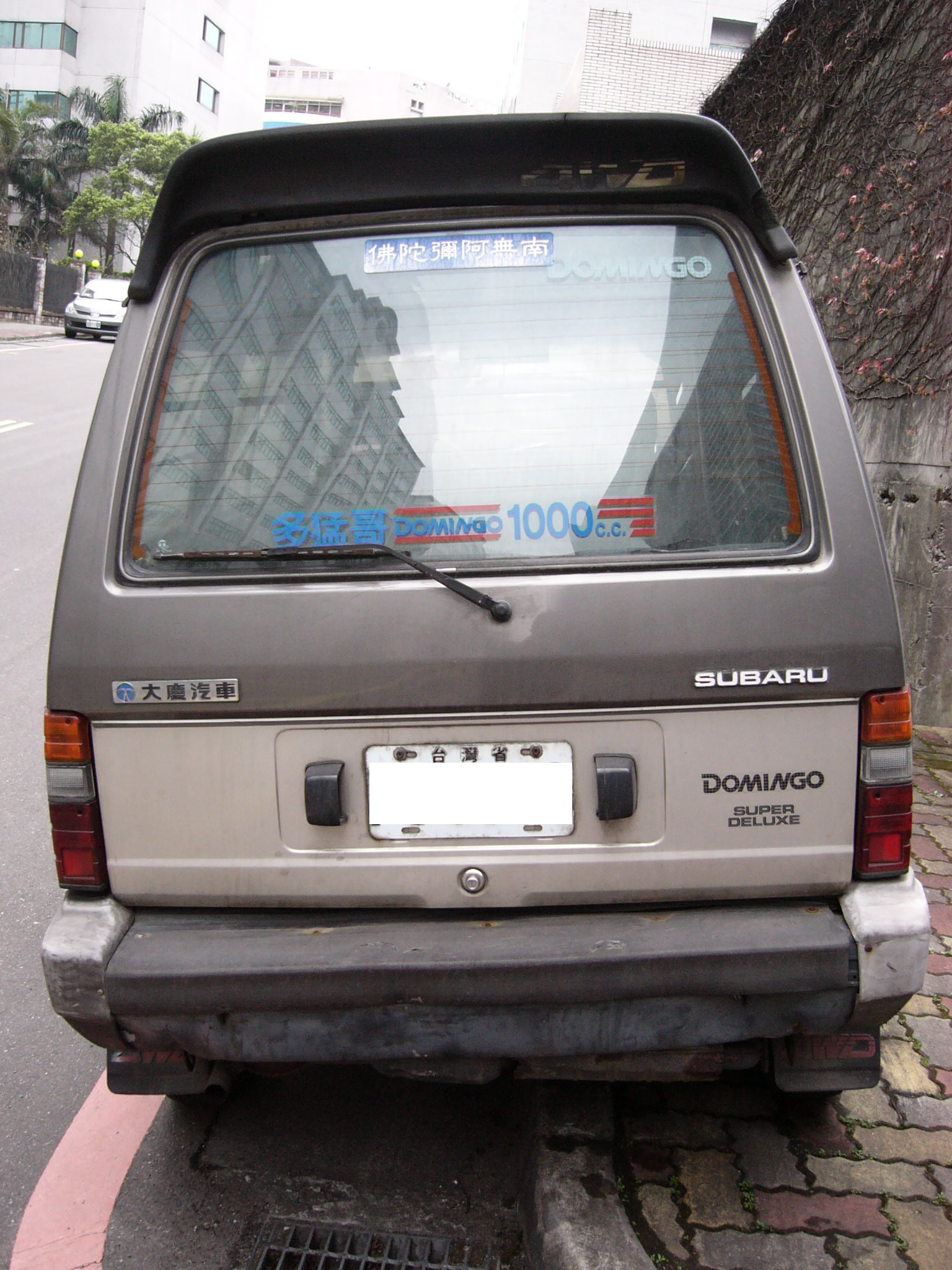
Rear end of the TCMC-made Domingo 1000c.c.van. The TCMC badge could be seen on the rear hatch

Ta Ching Motor Co. (TCMC; Chinese: 大慶汽車工業股份有限公司) was a Taiwanese automotive manufacturer between 1986 and 2002. Headquartered in Pingtung City, it was the official procuration dealer of the Japanese Subaru motor brand in Taiwan. Its main shareholders included Taiwan Vespa Co., Ltd., and the parent company of the Subaru brand, Fuji Heavy Industries. The annual production in the 1990s was 20,000 per year, but quickly scaled down to 1,713 in the year 2001. Fuji Heavy Industries tried to obtain the sales and production of Taiwan-made Subaru vehicles on their own, but failed to increase sales. The cooperation between TCMC and Fuji Heavy Industries ended in 2002 when TCMC went defunct.

== Introduction ==
Established in 1986, Ta Ching Motor Co. was the eighth automobile manufacturer in Taiwan. After the introduction in 1989, the Domingo van and Justy hatchback started production, and later that year, Fuji Heavy Industries signed a long-term contract with TCMC. Ta Ching Motor Co. later developed the Tutto sedan unique to Taiwan based on the Justy hatchback. In the following year(1990), the 2.2L Subaru Legacy was imported while the Taiwanese market started to crowd.

In 1997, the Subaru Impreza was introduced and put into production. These were exported to Finland, Chile, and Dominica in the following year, becoming the first Taiwan-made vehicles to be exported to Northern European and Latin American countries. Ta Ching Motor Co. still failed, however, due to slow car sales in Taiwan at the time, which resulted in long term debt.

== Products ==
- Domingo
- Estratto
- Impreza GT/RX/Limited
- Impreza Casa Blanca
- Justy hatchback
- Tutto sedan(Designed by TCMC based on the Justy hatchback)
- Legacy(Imported from Japan)
- Forester(Imported from Japan)

== Aftermath ==
- In March 2002, Fuji Heavy Industries removed all Japanese board members from TCMC.
- The factory of TCMC in Pingtung City was sold to Honda Taiwan as Honda's main production base in Taiwan. In 2016 the property was resold to SuperAlloy Industry(SAI) alloy manufacturer as their new production facility.
- From 1 April 2002, Subaru of Taiwan Co., Ltd. (SOT), a subsidiary of Fuji Heavy Industries took charge of importing new Subaru vehicles in Taiwan.
- From 2006, Motor Image Enterprises Pte Ltd. based in Singapore obtained the procuration rights of the Subaru brand in Taiwan from Fuji Heavy Industries and established Taiwan Motor Image Co., Ltd. The first dealership was established in November 2007 in Neihu, Taipei.
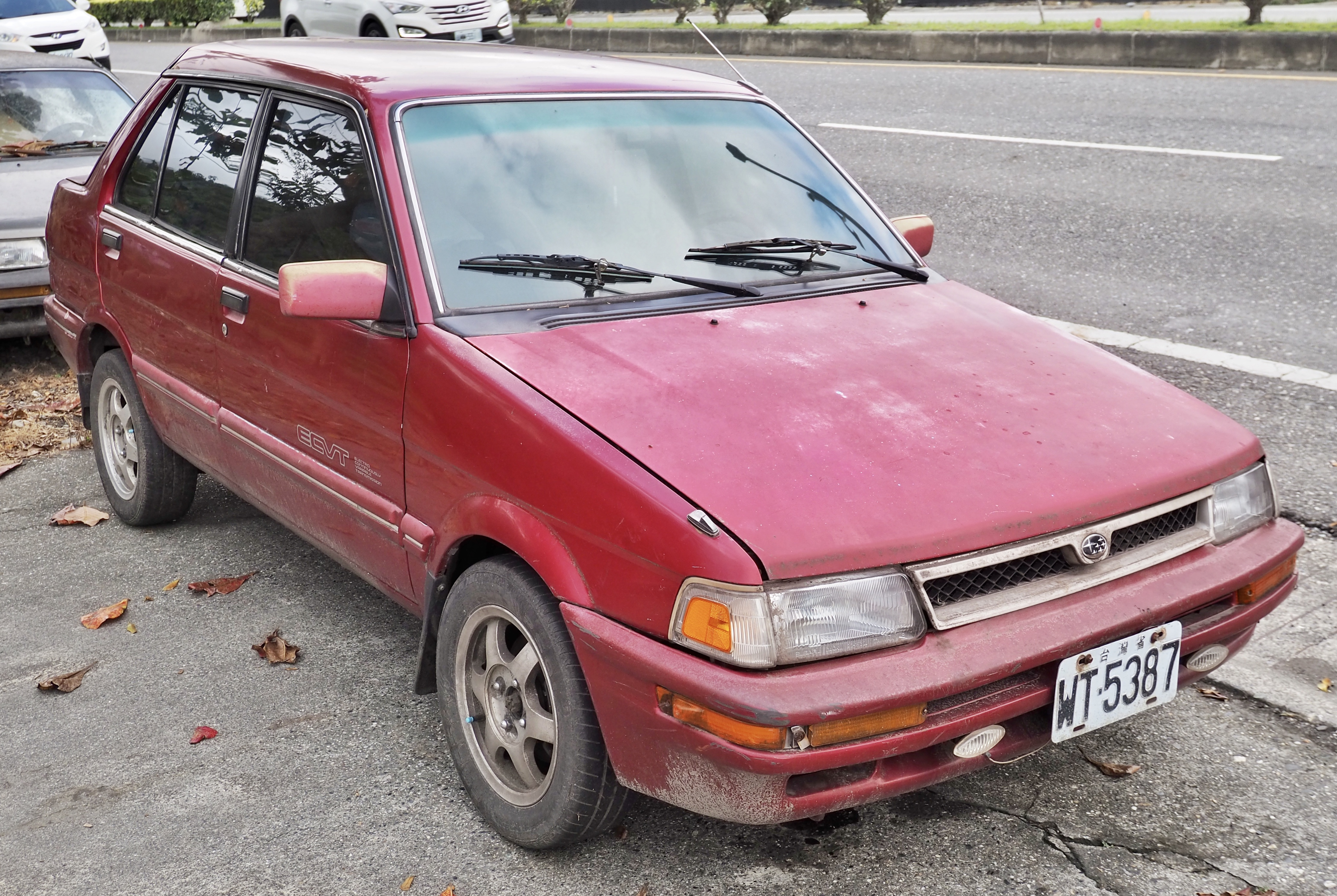
Tutto.

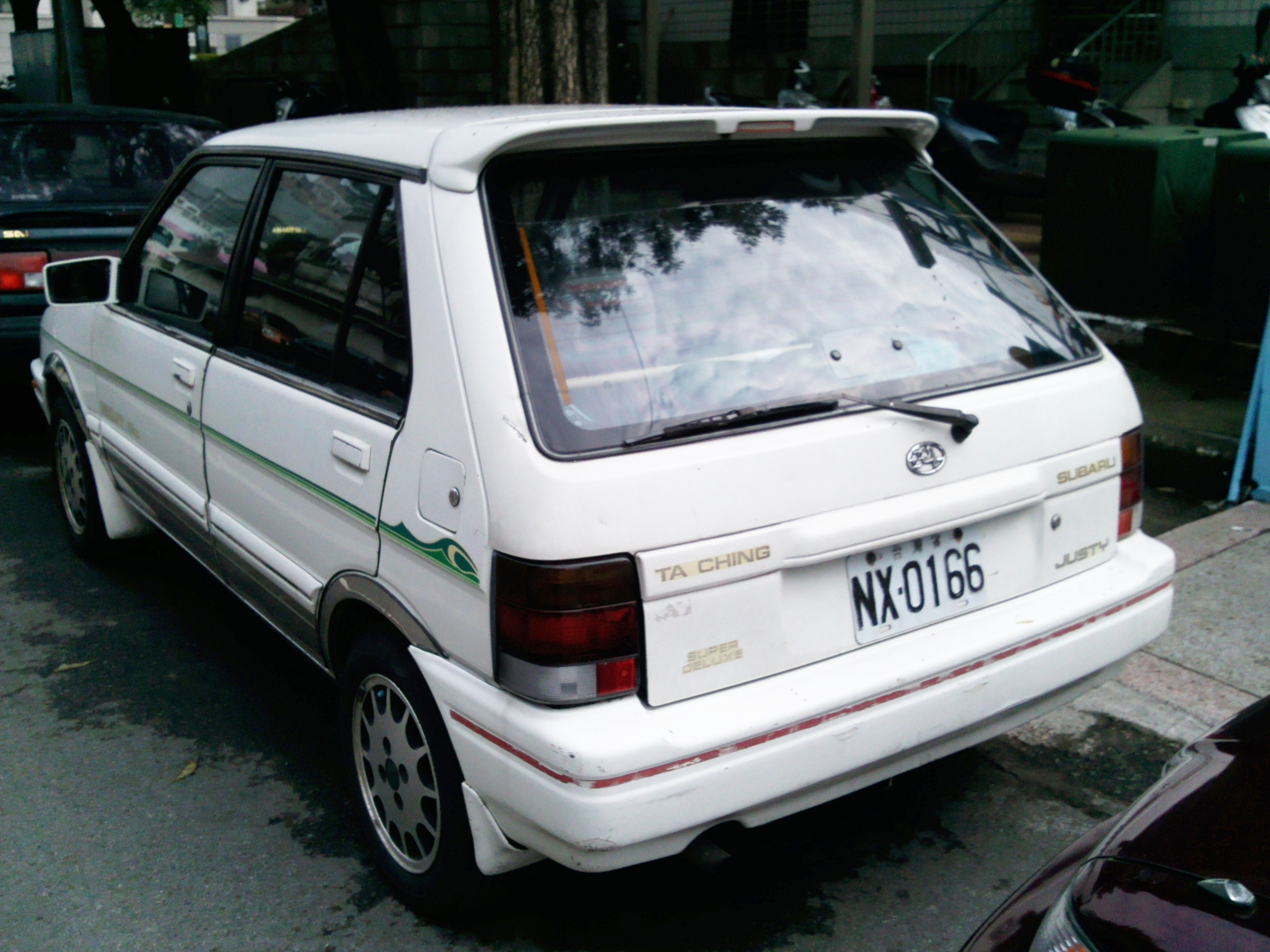
First Generation Justy, With the "Ta Ching" label.

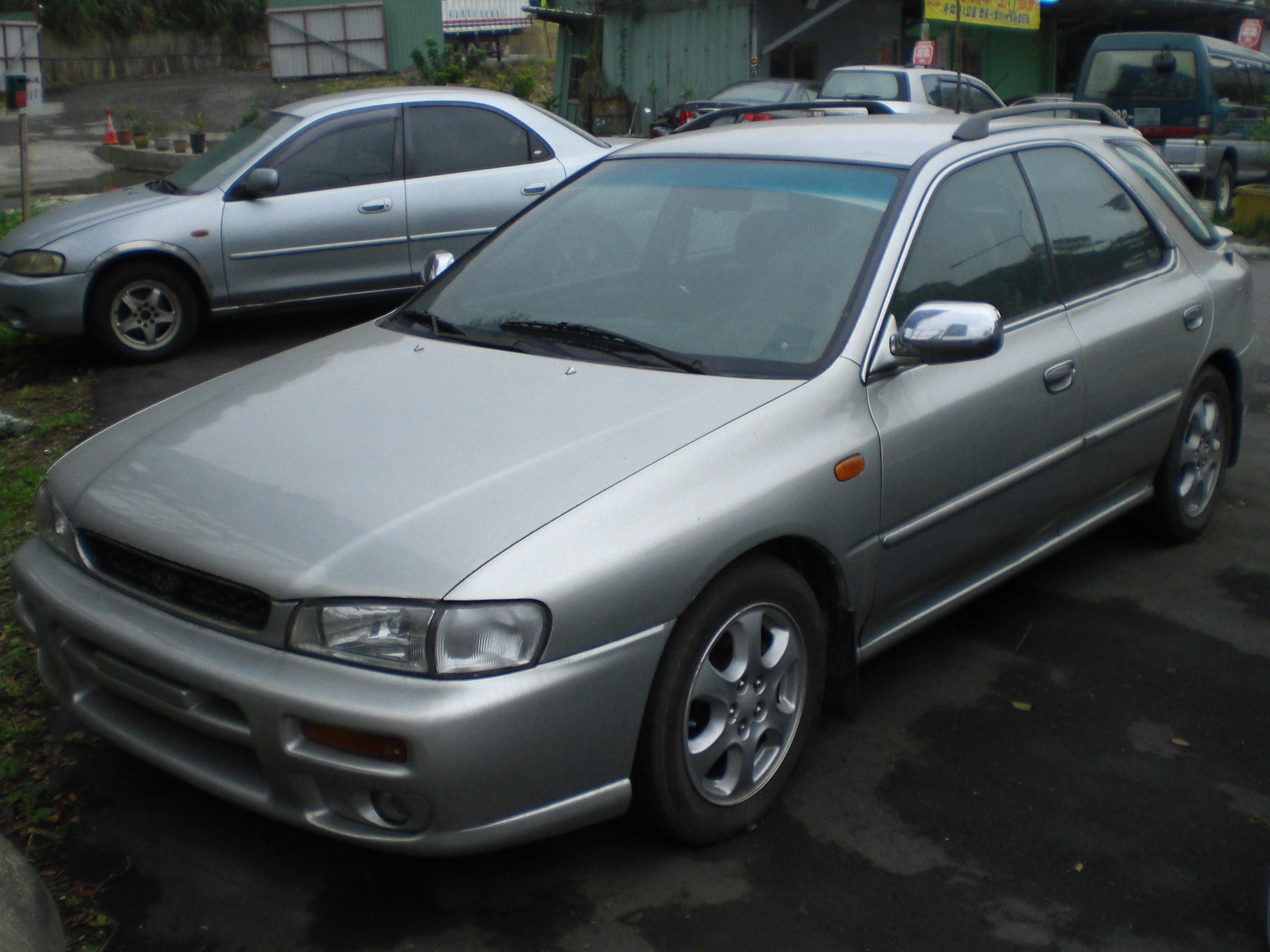
First Generation Impreza AWD.

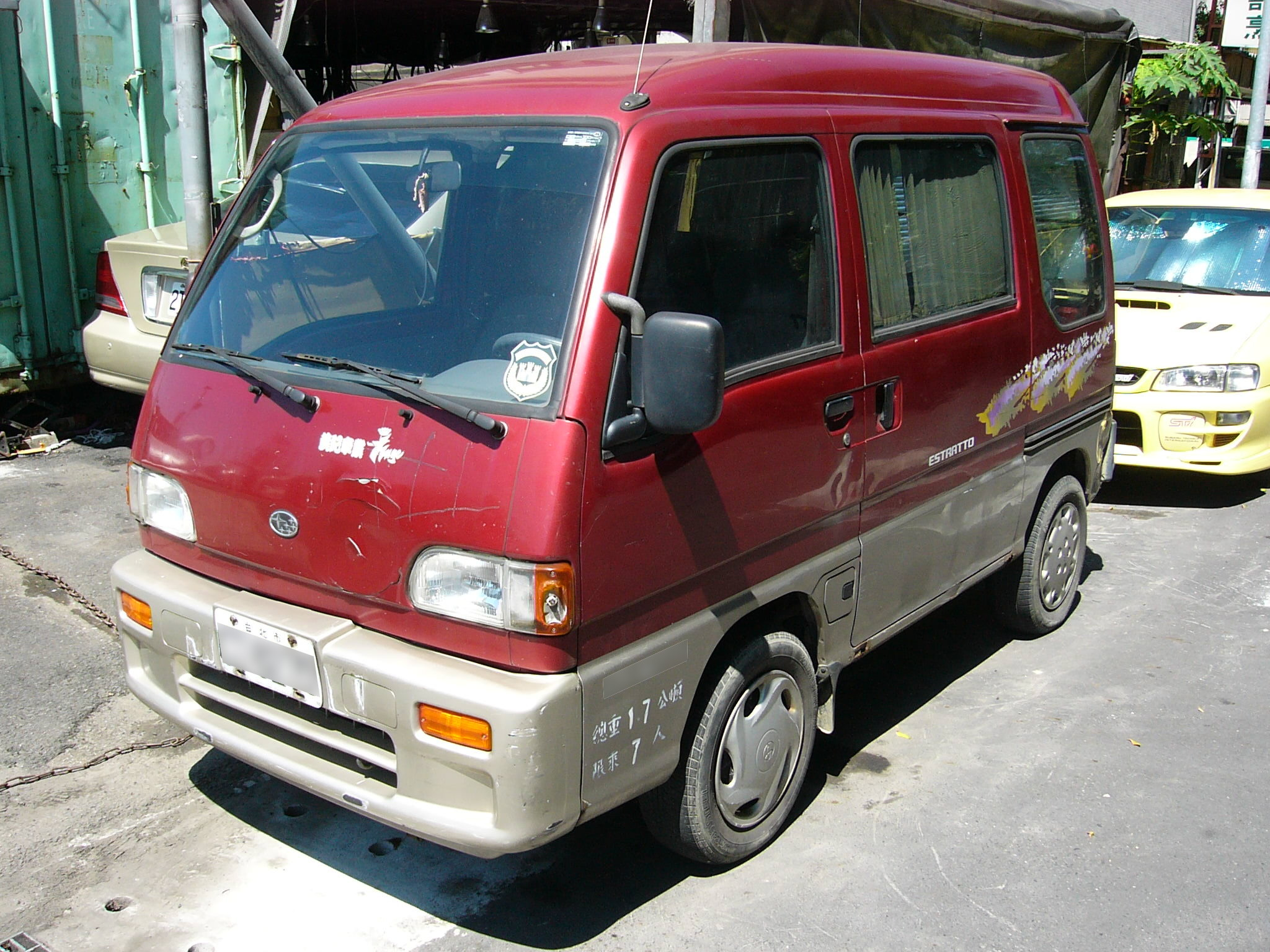
Estratto 1.2MPI.

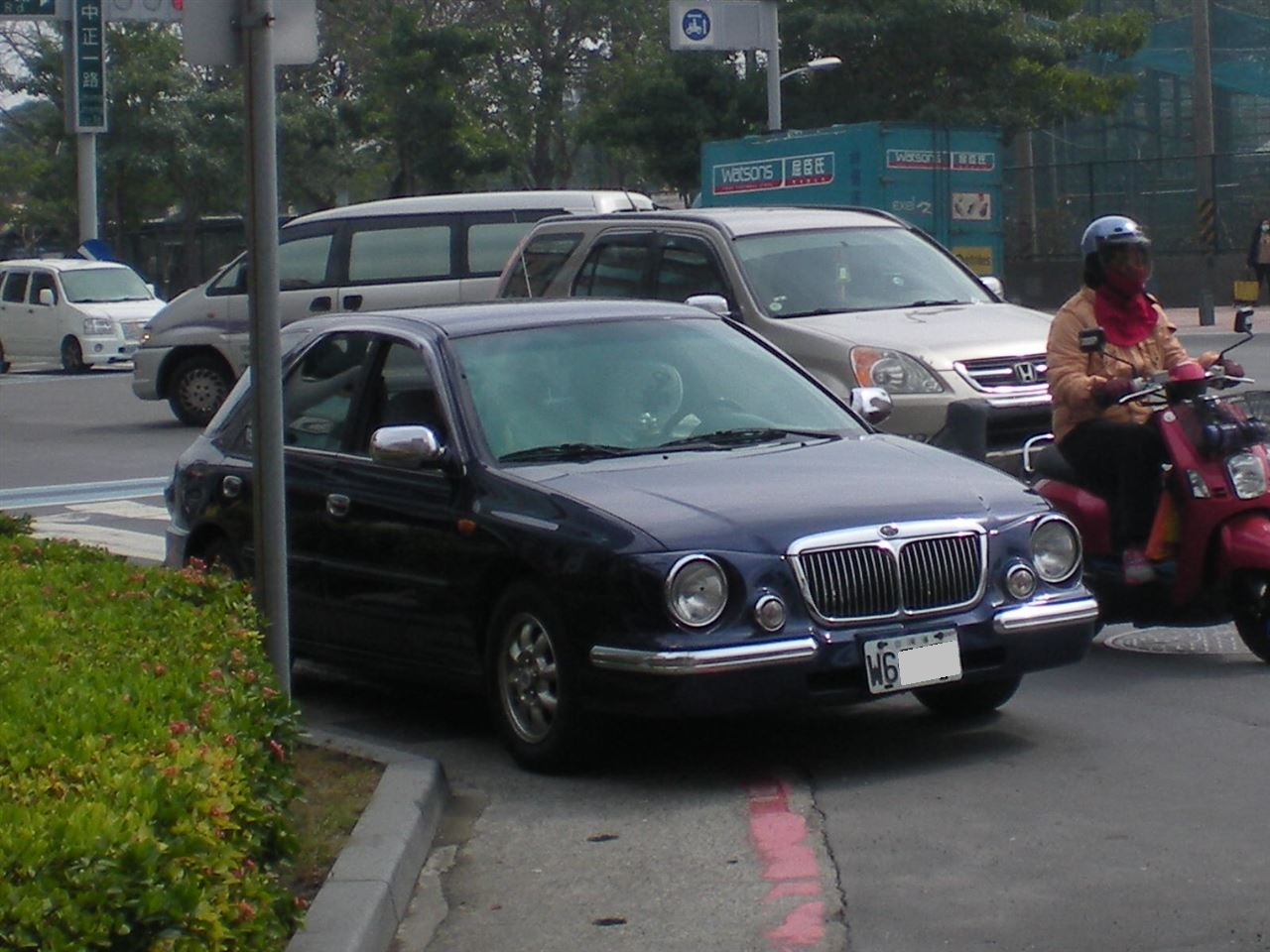
Casa Blanca.

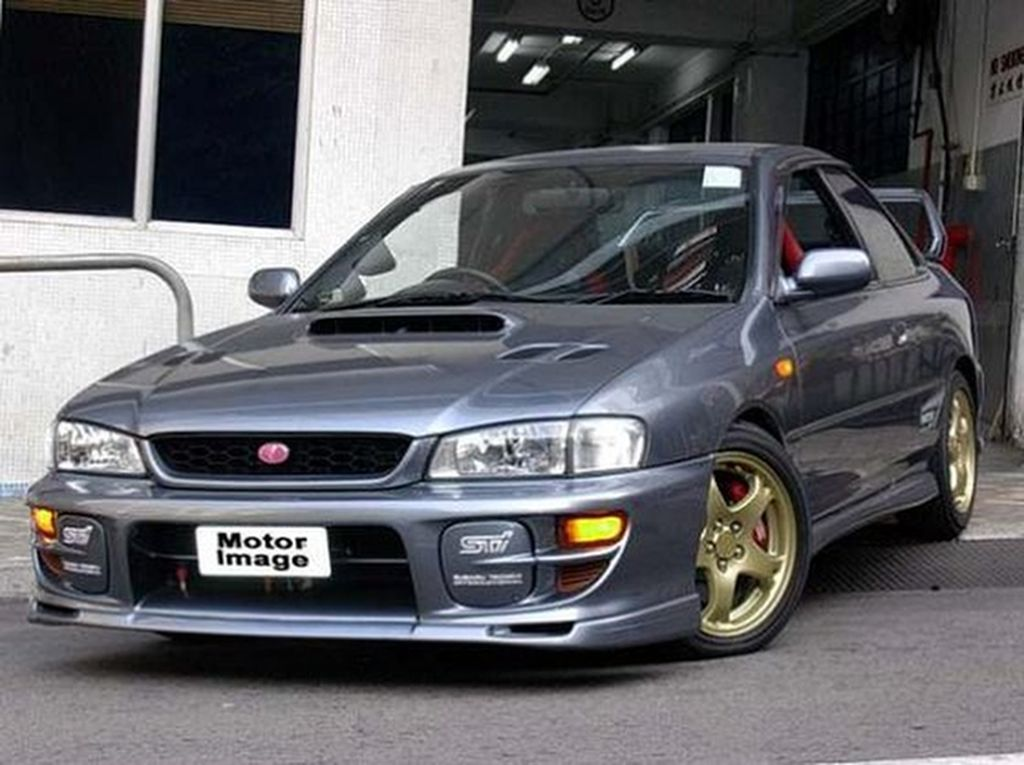
Impreza GT.

== See also ==
- Transportation in Taiwan
- List of Taiwanese automakers
- List of companies of Taiwan
- Fuji Heavy Industries
- Subaru
