= Elcat Electric Vehicles =

Finnish vehicle manufacturer and importer

Elcat Oy
- Industry: Automotive
- Founded: 1985; 40 years ago
- Defunct: April 20, 2017
- Fate: Bankrupted
- Headquarters: Järvenpää, Finland

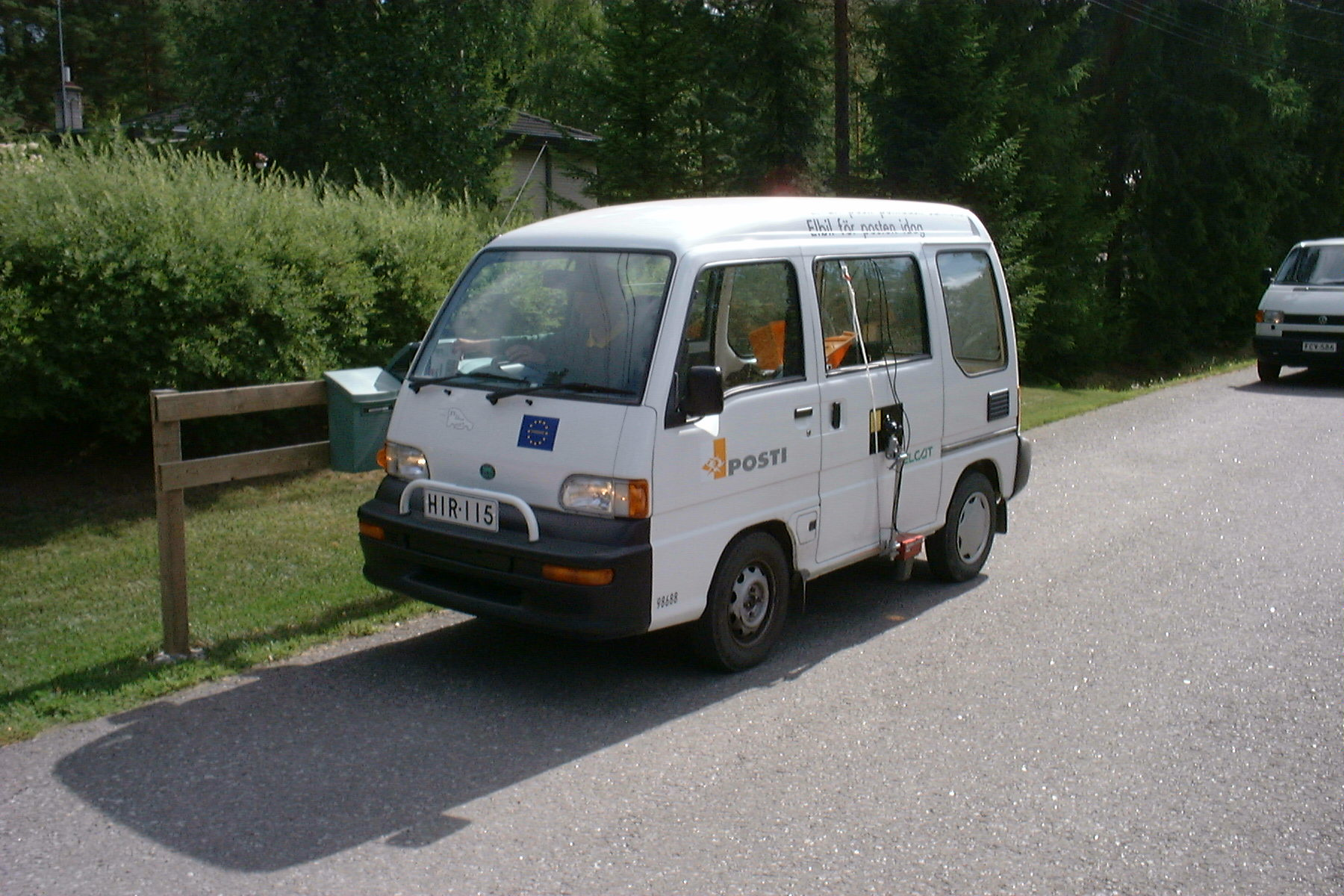
An Elcat Cityvan used by the Finnish post office

Elcat was a battery electric vehicle manufacturer and an electric vehicle importer based in Järvenpää, Finland.

Elcat Automotive was owned by an electricity producer called Fortum until the production decreased in the early 21st century. Elcat began working in 1974 to design electric cars for Nordic climate. The first prototypes for Elcat's automotive industry were made in 1985 with a joint venture plan with Subaru's Sambar, Dias, and Domingo vans, while the first commercial product was released in 1990. The users of Elcat vehicles were Finnish post office (Posti) and Stockholm-based delivery service.

Elcat ceased car production in 2002 and pivoted to importing electric vehicles. The company imported and sold electric quadricycles, golf carts, and maintenance vehicles as well as electric mopeds and bicycles.

Elcat went bankrupt in 2017.

== Models ==
- Cityvan, speed 72 km/h (45 mph), distance 70 kilometres (43.5 mi)
- Cityvan 200, speed 80 km/h (50 mph), distance 70 kilometres (43.5 mi)
- Cityvan 202, speed 90 km/h (56 mph), distance 80 kilometres (49.7 mi)
- Citywagon 202, speed 88 km/h (55 mph), distance 76 kilometres (47.2 mi)
