= Airdale Sportplane and Supply =

American aircraft manufacturer

- Company type: Privately held company
- Industry: Aerospace
- Predecessor: Avid Aircraft
- Founded: 1999
- Defunct: 2017
- Fate: Out of business
- Headquarters: Rhinelander, Wisconsin, United States
- Key people: Brett McKinney
- Products: Kit aircraft, aircraft parts
- Website: airdale.com

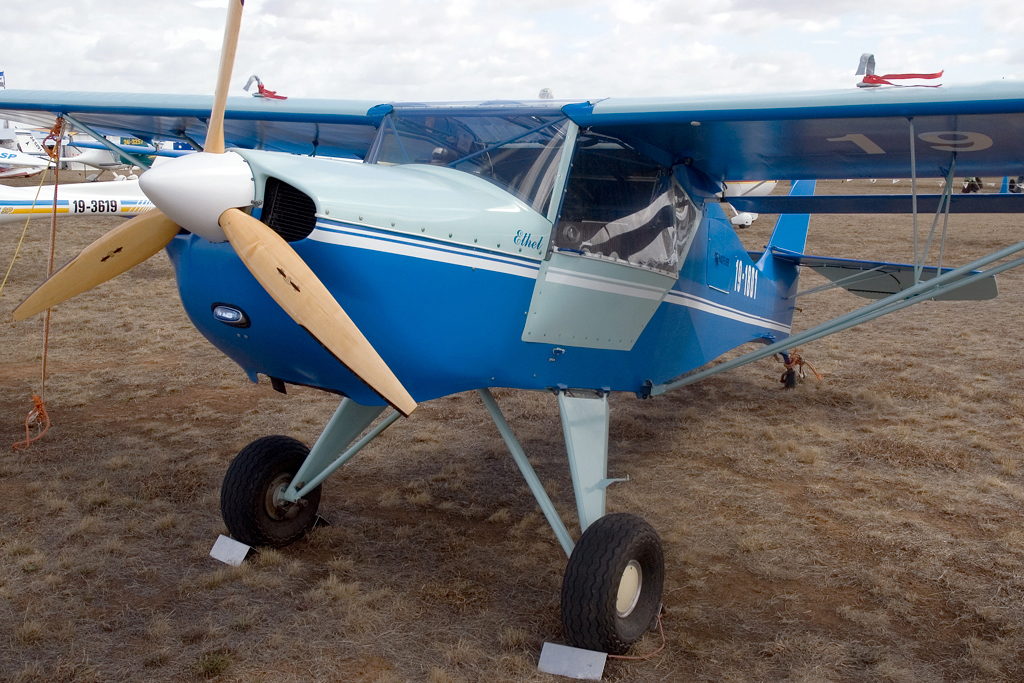
Avid Mk IV

Airdale Sportplane and Supply (also called the Airdale Flyer Company) was an American aircraft manufacturer, founded by Brett McKinney and based in Rhinelander, Wisconsin. The company specialized in the design and manufacture of light aircraft in the form of kits for amateur construction, as well as replacement aircraft parts.

The company was formed in 1999 after Avid Aircraft initially went out of business in 1998. Avid was restarted, but went out of business for the final time in November 2003. Airdale initially started making parts for Avid designs and later put the two-seat Avid Mk IV back into production. The Mk IV was further developed into the Airdale Backcountry by John Larsen, an aircraft initially called the Airdale Airdale. A conversion kit to modify Mk IVs to Backcountry standard is available. The company also produces an improved landing gear set for the Avid Mk IV design, called Bushgear.

At one time the company also produced the Avid Magnum as a kit aircraft.

As of mid 2017 the company was no longer trading.

== Aircraft ==
Summary of aircraft built by Airdale Sportplane and Supply
Model name	First flight	Number built	Type
Avid Mk IV			Two seat kit aircraft
Avid Magnum			Two seat kit aircraft
Airdale Backcountry		4 (2011)	Two seat kit aircraft
