= Subaru Sumo =

Overview
- Manufacturer: Subaru
- Also called: Subaru Domingo; Subaru Columbuss (Sweden); Subaru Combi (Belgium); Subaru E10/E12; Subaru Estratto (Taiwan); Subaru Libero; Subaru Vanille (France); Elcat Cityvan/Citywagon
- Production: 1983–1998

Body and chassis
- Class: Microvan
- Body style: 5-door van
- Layout: Rear-engine, rear-wheel drive / four-wheel drive

Powertrain
- Engine: 1.0 L EF10 I3; 1.2 L EF12 I3
- Transmission: 5-speed manual ECVT automatic

Dimensions
- Length: 3,425 mm (134.8 in) (1983–1993); 3,525 mm (138.8 in) (1993–1998)
- Width: 1,430 mm (56.3 in) (1983–1993); 1,415 mm (55.7 in) (1993–1998)
- Height: 1,925 mm (75.8 in)
- Curb weight: 1,040 kg (2,293 lb)

The Subaru Sumo, known as Domingo in the Japanese market and the Libero in European markets except for the UK, Iceland, the Benelux and Sweden, is a cabover microvan produced from 1983 to 1998. In Belgium, it was known as the Combi. In Sweden, it was known as the Columbuss (buss meaning "bus" in Swedish), and in Taiwan the latter generation was marketed as the Estratto. It was also called the Subaru E10 and Subaru E12 respectively in some places, the names referring to the size of the engines.

Subaru's German importer chose the name Libero after a public naming competition in 1984. The name Sumo, used in most English-speaking markets, was meant to evoke the car's Japanese origin and the strength of a sumo wrestler.

== Characteristics ==
The Sumo shared many characteristics with the Sambar, except it had extended front and rear bumpers and a larger engine borrowed from the Subaru Justy. Because of these modifications, it didn't conform to kei car regulations, which stipulate the maximum dimensions of the vehicle and the maximum engine displacement requirements, which then determine the vehicle tax to be paid.

The Sambar from which the Domingo was derived was developed around a two-cylinder engine; the longer three-cylinder unit requires additional space and actually projects into the rear bumper, which has to be removed for even basic servicing. This also leaves the engine quite exposed if the car becomes rear ended.

== History ==
=== First generation (KJ) ===
It was launched with the option of four-wheel drive and powered by 997 cc, later 1,189 cc three-cylinder EF engines based on those used in the Subaru Justy although in the van they were rear mounted. Somewhat unusual for a microvan, the 1,200 cc Sumo could be ordered with selectable 4WD, operated via a gear stick mounted button. In normal driving conditions, only the rear wheels were driven, as there was no central differential to allow highway driving in 4WD mode. In European trim, the carburetted 1.2-liter engine produces 52 PS (38 kW; 51 hp) at 4,400 rpm. The original Libero/Sumo remained available well after the release of the next generation Sambar.

=== Second generation (FA) ===
In 1993, the second generation appeared, with all new sheetmetal as per the related Sambar range. Thanks to fuel injection, a catalytic converter was added to the 1.2-liter engine (the only option) while power inched up to 54 PS (40 kW; 53 hp). In Japanese specifications, claimed power was 61 PS JIS (45 kW; 60 hp) at 5,600 rpm In 1994, Subaru's Full Time 4WD (S-AWD) with viscous coupling was added to the options list, only available together with the ECVT transmission. An oil cooler was installed on European versions to better facilitate light duty towing.

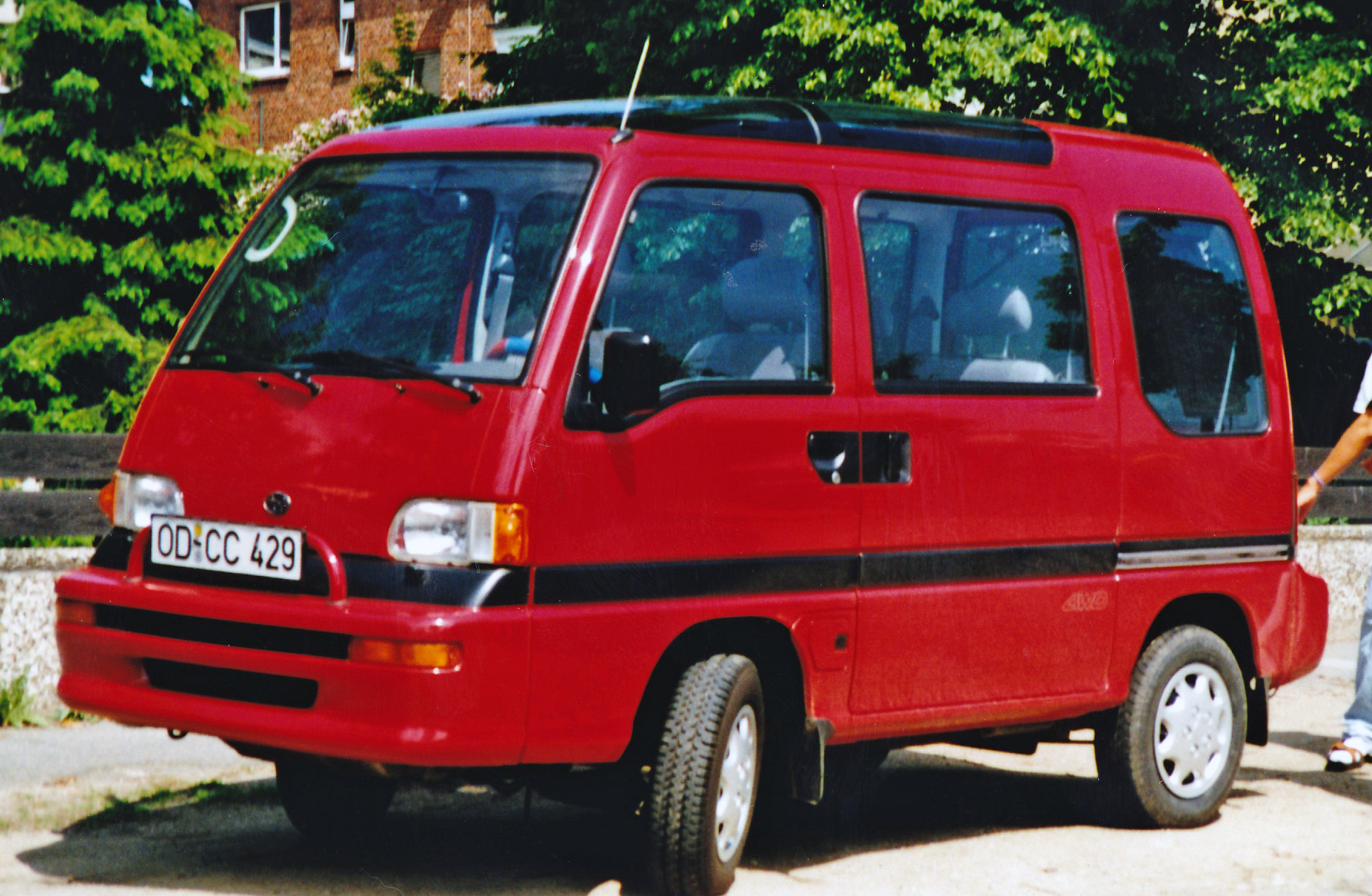
Second generation Subaru Libero (Germany)

The Sumo was discontinued when the sixth generation Sambar was introduced, and the market that the Sumo was targeted at was refocused towards the Subaru Forester, which, in comparison to the Sumo, had standard permanent 4WD, a more potent 2.5 L boxer engine and increased cargo capacity. In Japan, the Domingo's market segment is now served by the Subaru Exiga, which is capable of carrying up to seven passengers.
