= Avid Aircraft Magnum =

Magnum
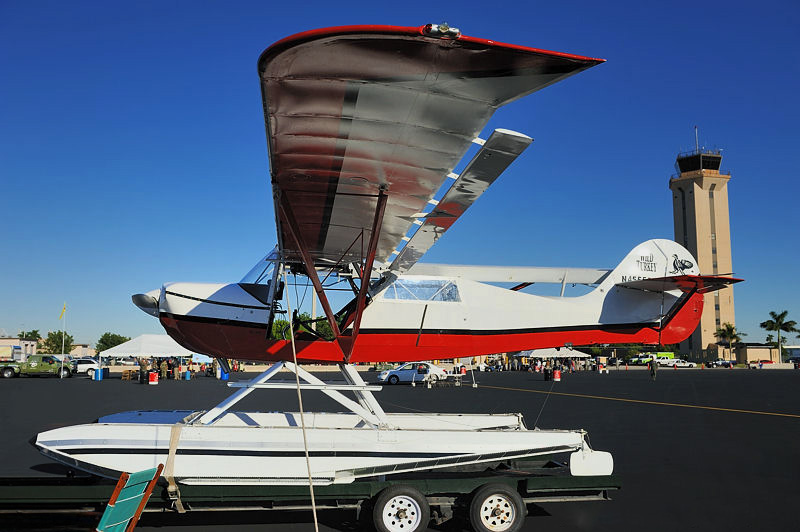
- Avid Aircraft Magnum floatplane

General information
- Type: Two-seat cabin monoplane
- National origin: United States
- Manufacturer: Avid Aircraft; Airdale Flyer Company
- Status: In production (2010)

The Avid Aircraft Magnum is an American two-seat homebuilt cabin monoplane which was designed and sold as kits by Avid Aircraft of Caldwell, Idaho.

== Design and development ==
The Magnum is a high-wing strut-braced monoplane with a welded steel tube fuselage, the wings have aluminium spars and wooden ribs covered with Ceconite. The Magnum was sold without an engine and was designed for a range of Lycoming engines from 115 to 180 hp (86 to 134 kW), for example the Lycoming O-235, O-320 or the O-360. The enclosed cabin has side-by-side configuration seating for two with an option for an additional seat in the baggage area for two children or a small adult. It has a fixed conventional landing gear with a tailwheel and some are fitted with floats.

By 2010 the aircraft was back in production by the Airdale Flyer Company of Rhinelander, Wisconsin. The Airdale version includes some modifications, including enlarged landing gear, plus optional tricycle landing gear.

== Specifications (fitted with a 160hp O-320 engine) ==
Data from Jane's All the World's Aircraft 1995-1996

General characteristics

- Crew: one
- Capacity: one passenger
- Length: 21 ft 0 in (6.40 m)
- Wingspan: 33 ft 0 in (10.06 m)
- Height: 6 ft 1.25 in (1.86 m)
- Wing area: 140.25 sq ft (13.03 m^{2})
- Empty weight: 1,025 lb (465 kg)
- Gross weight: 1,750 lb (794 kg)
- Powerplant: 1 × Lycoming O-320 four cylinder, air-cooled, horizontally opposed piston aircraft engine , 160 hp (119 kW)

Performance

- Maximum speed: 150 mph (241 km/h, 130 kn)
- Cruise speed: 130 mph (209 km/h, 110 kn)
- Stall speed: 36 mph (58 km/h, 31 kn)
- Service ceiling: 17,500 ft (5,335 m)
- Rate of climb: 1,500 ft/min (7.6 m/s)
