= Subaru Justy =

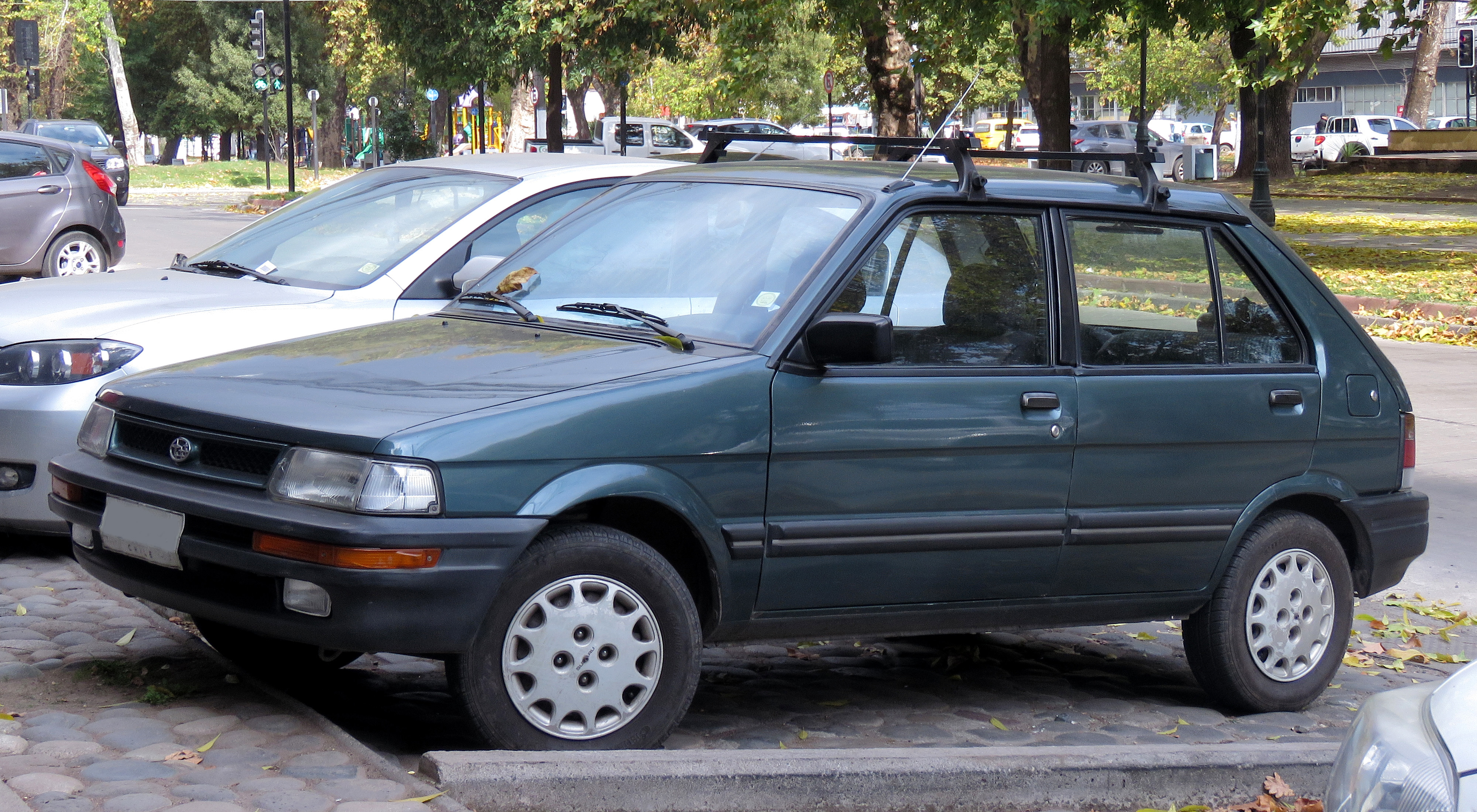
- Facelift model of first generation Subaru Justy

Overview
- Manufacturer: Subaru; Suzuki; Daihatsu (2004–present)
- Production: 1984–2010; 2016–present

Body and chassis
- Class: Subcompact (B)
- Body style: 3-door and 5-door hatchback
- Layout: Front engine FWD / 4WD

The Subaru Justy is a subcompact hatchback manufactured and marketed by Japanese automaker Subaru since 1984. The company has marketed a rebadged variant known as the Daihatsu Boon (second generation), at the 2007 Frankfurt Motor Show with could be optioned with a 1.0 or 1.2-litre inline-3 engine, front/four wheel drive, electronically controlled continuously variable transaxle, or a 5-speed manual transaxle. For the 2010 model year, the Justy was replaced with the Subaru Trezia. The Justy nameplate was revived in November 2016 as a rebadged Toyota Tank and its twin counterpart the Toyota Roomy and Daihatsu Thor.

== First generation ==
First generation
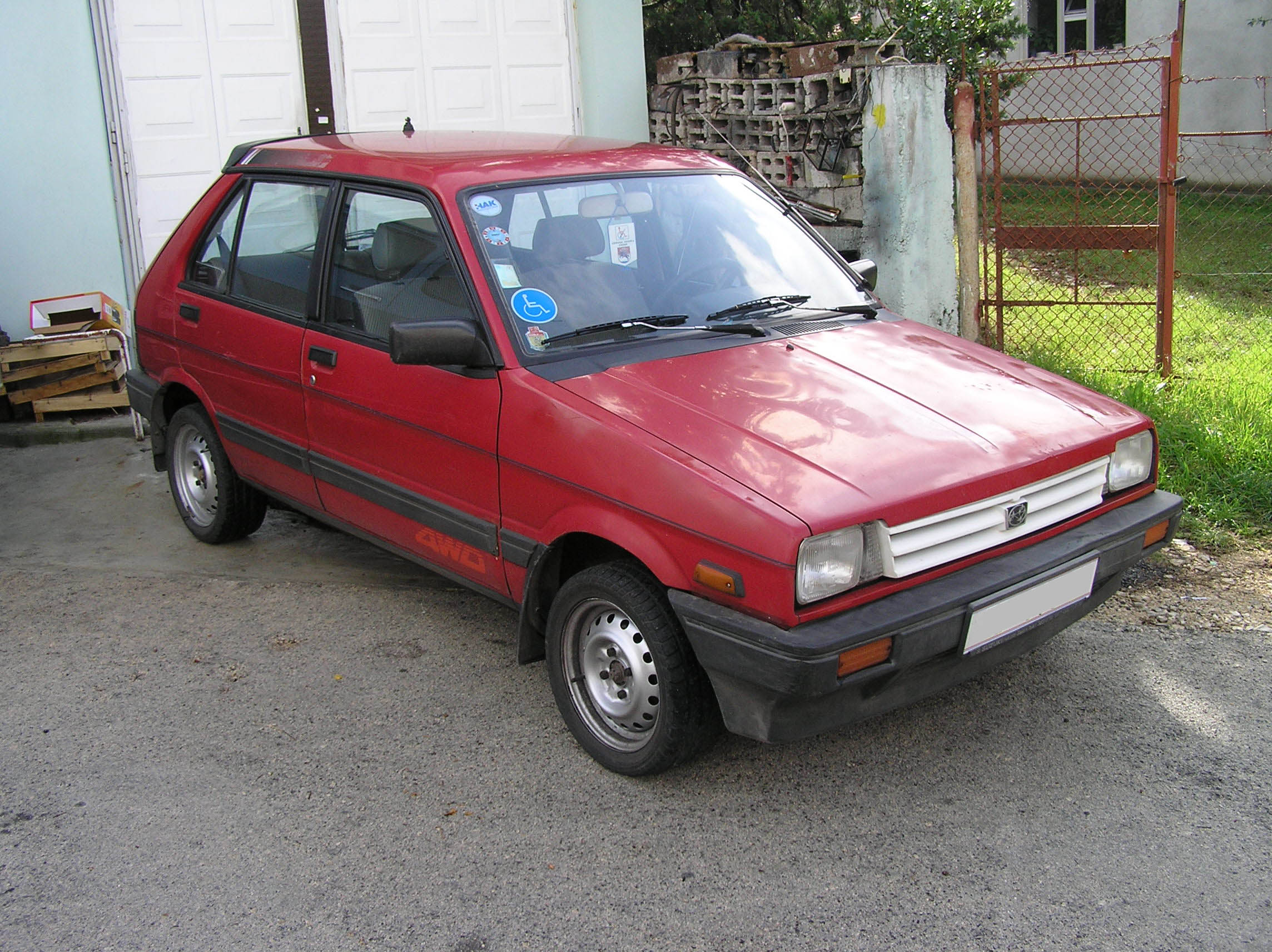
- Subaru Justy 4WD, original version

Overview
- Manufacturer: Subaru
- Model code: KA
- Also called: Subaru Trendy; Subaru Tutto (Taiwan)
- Production: 1984–1994

Body and chassis
- Class: Subcompact (B)
- Body style: 3-door and 5-door hatchback; 5-Door Notchback (Taiwan)
- Layout: Front engine FWD / 4WD
- Platform: J and K

Powertrain
- Engine: 997 cc EF10 I3; 1189 cc EF12 I3
- Transmission: 5-speed manual; NCVT

Dimensions
- Wheelbase: 90 in (2,300 mm)
- Length: 145.5 in (3,700 mm); 153.5 in (3,900 mm) (Tutto)
- Width: 60.4 in (1,530 mm)
- Height: 53.7 in (1,360 mm)
- Curb weight: 1,950 lb (885 kg)

Chronology
- Successor: Subaru Trezia

Originally designed and manufactured in Japan, the Justy was introduced in Japan for 1984 model year as a widened and stretched version of the Rex kei car, using the same doors and other pressings. To Japanese buyers, it was longer and wider and had an engine larger than kei car dimension regulations outlined, while keeping the engine displacement just under 1000 cc to minimize the annual road tax obligation. The electronically controlled, continuously variable "ECVT" transmission was introduced in February 1987. Production of this model was limited to 500 per month due to limited supplies of steel bands from Van Doorne transmission, but as the Justy ECVT was not an unqualified success, this was not a real problem. When supplies later increased, Subaru chose to use them for the smaller Rex instead. The Justy was originally available with a low or a high roof, with the flat roofed version gradually leaving production.

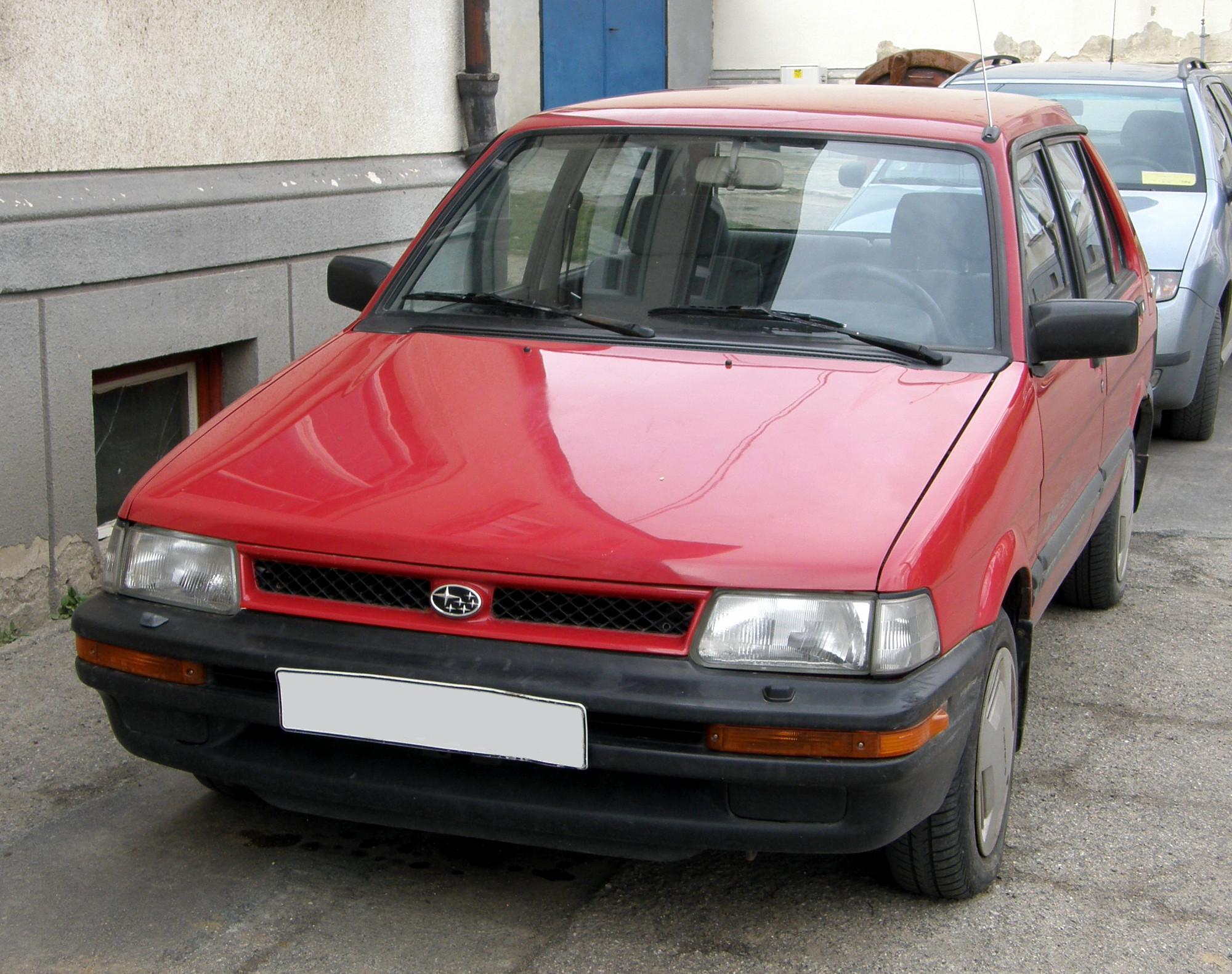
Facelifted first generation Justy (1989–1994)

European and American versions followed in 1987 and all models received a restyling in 1989. In some countries, such as Sweden, the Justy was marketed as the Subaru Trendy. In some regions, it was also simply marketed as the 'J-series' in early years, J10 for 1.0 L versions and J12 for the later 1.2 L versions. In many markets, the Justy was only sold with four-wheel-drive, as with much of the Subaru lineup. Intended to compete with Daihatsu's one-litre Charade, the Justy was presented with a one-litre engine. Somewhat underpowered, this was later complemented by a larger 1.2-litre which eventually became the only engine option available. In European catalyzed trim, this engine offered 80 PS (59 kW) at 5200 rpm.

In Taiwan, Subaru marketed a version of the Justy with a sedan-style body and an uprated 80 PS (59 kW) fuel injected EF12 engine called the Tutto. Taiwanese Subarus were assembled by their local partner Ta Ching.

=== United States ===
Justy models manufactured in Japan were marketed for model years 1987-1994 with the 1.2 engine. Early models featured a low-roof, and beginning with the 1989 models, featured a high roof. The Justy received 4WD as an option in 1988, and all models were equipped with Multi Port Fuel Injection late in 1991. For 1990, the automatic front two-point motorized passive seat belts were introduced for 3-door FWD models in the United States market only, while manual front seat belts were retained on the 4WD models. A five-door model was available from 1990 to 1994, only with 4WD. A 1995 model was offered in Canada.

=== Norway ===
The Subaru Justy (registered as "Justy/Trendy" in Norway) was available from late 1984 with optional 4×4 and the EF10 engine. The 4×4 version came with a 40 kW (54 bhp) version of the engine with a two barrel carburetor, while the FWD version only produced 36 kW (48 bhp) with a single barrel carburetor. The 4×4 version had a factory top speed of 145 km/h (90 mph) and could accelerate from 0–100 km/h (0–62 mph) in roughly 16 seconds. Gear ratios were identical on the 1.0- and 1.2-litre versions. Stock tire dimensions on the 1.0-litre version had tire size 145-SR-12 and the 1.2-litre version had 165-65-R-13. The turning circle was 9.8 m (32 ft) and the fuel tank could hold 35 litres.

=== Taiwan ===
In 1989, Fuji Heavy Industries signed a long-term contract with Taiwanese automotive manufacturer Ta Ching Motor Co. who developed the Subaru Tutto notchback sedan, which was unique to Taiwan and based on the Justy hatchback.

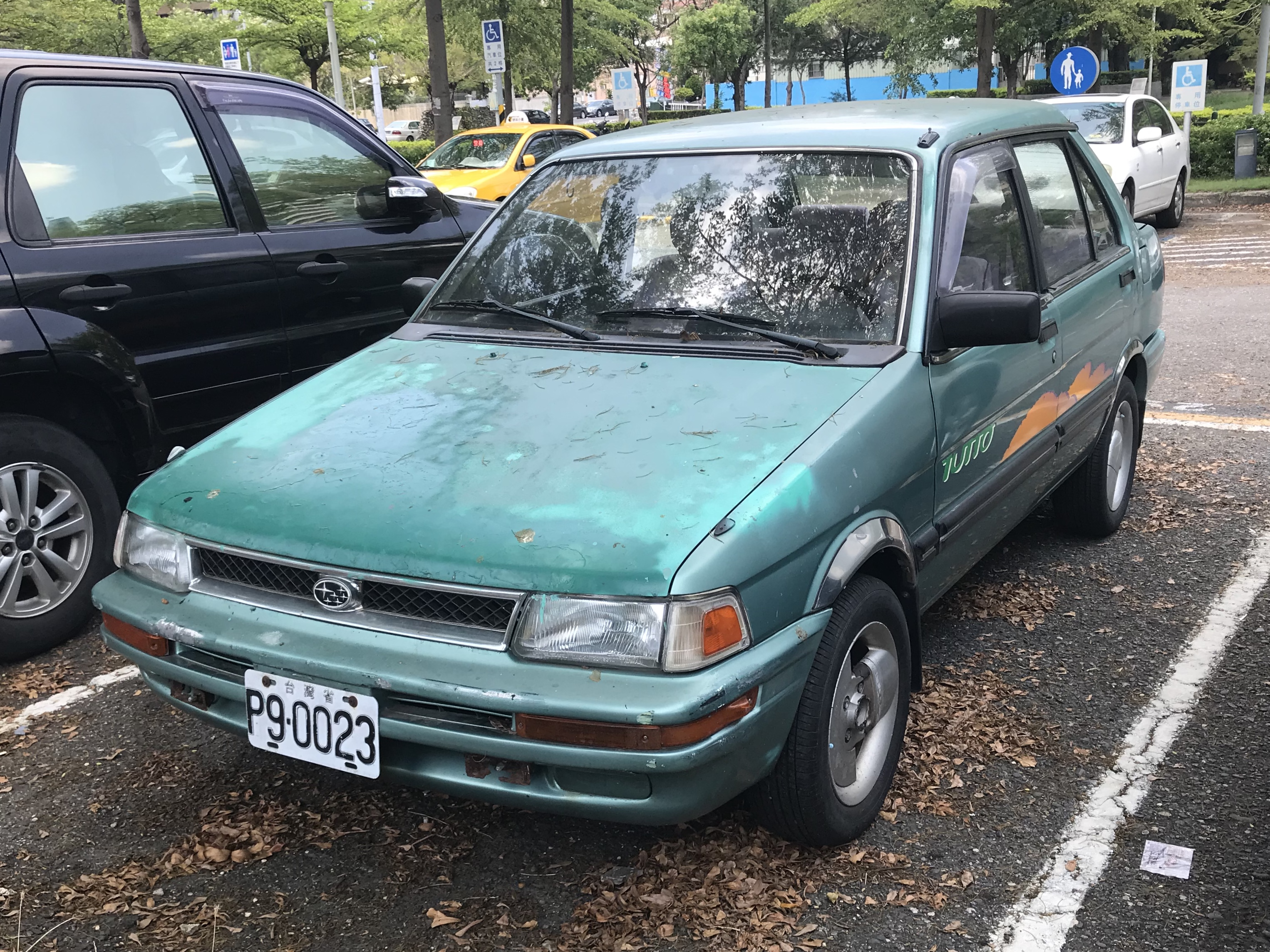
Subaru Tutto front quarter

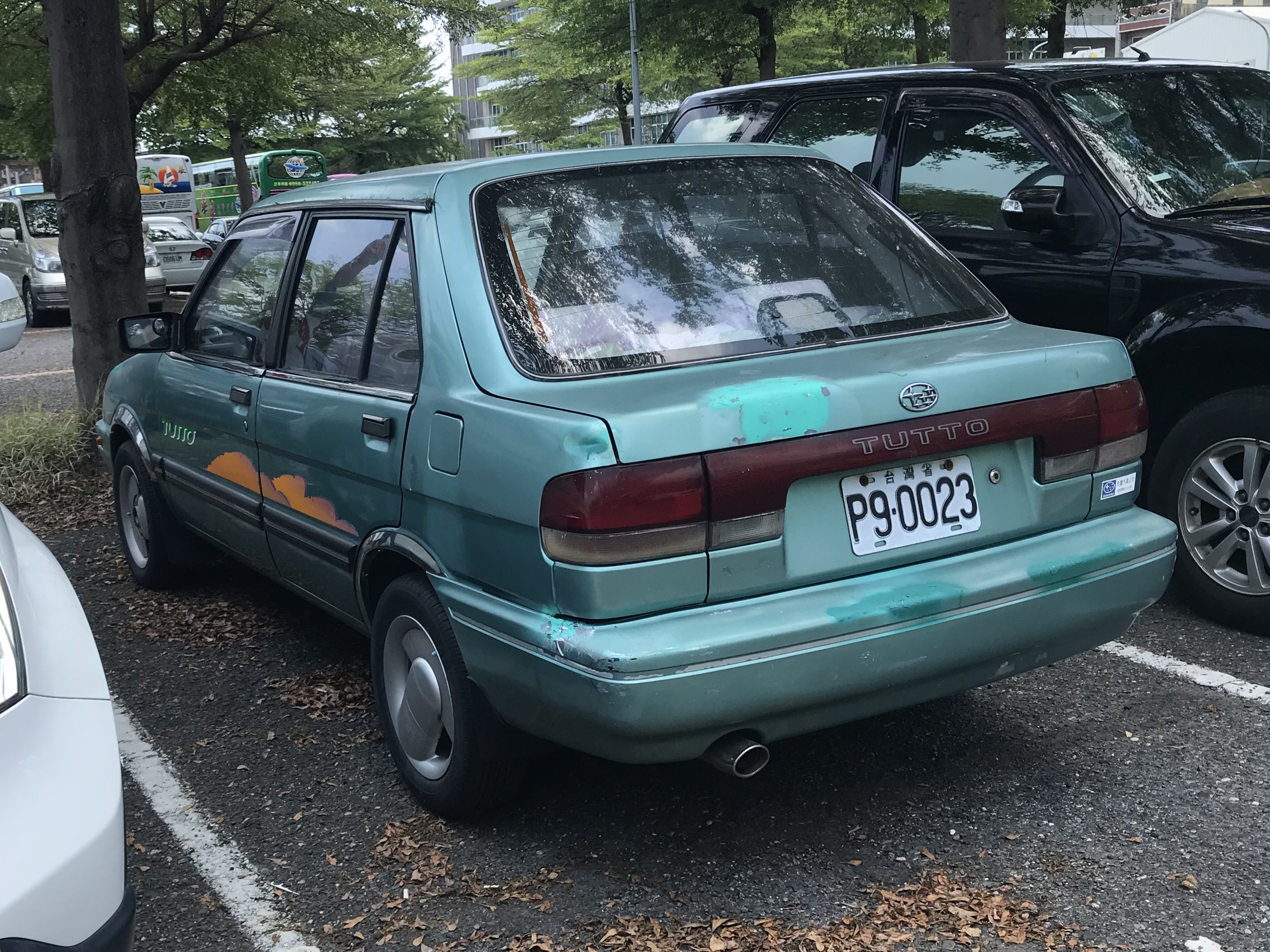
Subaru Tutto rear quarter

=== Drivetrain ===
Initially, the Justy was equipped with a 1.0 or 1.2 litre EF three-cylinder engine and either a manual transmission or a continuously variable transmission with either front wheel drive or on-demand four wheel drive. A CVT type transmission (a pushbelt system) was employed because with a conventional automatic transmission, performance would have been unacceptable due to the small-displacement, relatively low-power 3-cylinder engine. Also, within urban areas in Japan where the Justy was an affordable choice, speed limits often do not exceed 40 km/h (24.9 mph). In North America, due to larger roads with higher speed limits and longer distances, the CVT was considered unreliable, but this has not been the case in other countries.

In 1989, the gear ratios were changed, the front brakes and outer axle shafts were made larger, the rear differential was reinforced and the front axle shafts were changed to identical lengths thanks to an intermediate extension shaft.

=== Gear ratios ===
1987–1988

ECVT:	Not available until February 1987						
FWD:	1st 3.071	2nd 1.695	3rd 1.137	4th .823	5th .675	Rev 3.461	Final 4.437
4WD:	1st 3.071	2nd 1.695	3rd 1.137	4th .771	5th .631	Rev 3.461	Final 5.200, Differential 3.700

1989–1994

ECVT:	2.503-.497, Rev 2.475, Final 4.666, Differential 3.900						
FWD:	1st 3.071	2nd 1.695	3rd 1.137	4th .794	5th .675	Rev 3.461	Final 4.800
4WD:	1st 3.071	2nd 1.695	3rd 1.137	4th .794	5th .675	Rev 3.461	Final 5.285, Differential 3.700

== Rebadged models ==
After 1994, rebadged models from other manufacturers carried the Justy nameplate:

- In 1994, Subaru introduced to the Europe market a rebadged second generation Suzuki Cultus carrying the Justy nameplate. Manufactured at Suzuki's Esztergom, Hungary plant, these were available in 3 and 5 door models, both with full-time all wheel drive as standard.
- In 2004, a rebadged Suzuki Ignis carried the G3X Justy nameplate in Europe, this model is available with a Suzuki M13A or M15A engine, and also equipped as standard with AWD.
- For the 2007 model year, a rebadged Toyota Passo/Daihatsu Boon revived the Justy nameplate with the Toyota 1KR-FE 1.0 L engine. It was only available with front wheel drive, unlike previous Justy models since the first one in 1984 that had either optional or standard 4WD/AWD.
- In late 2016, a rebadged Toyota Roomy/Tank/Daihatsu Thor revived the Justy nameplate with the Toyota 1KR-FE 1.0 L engine.
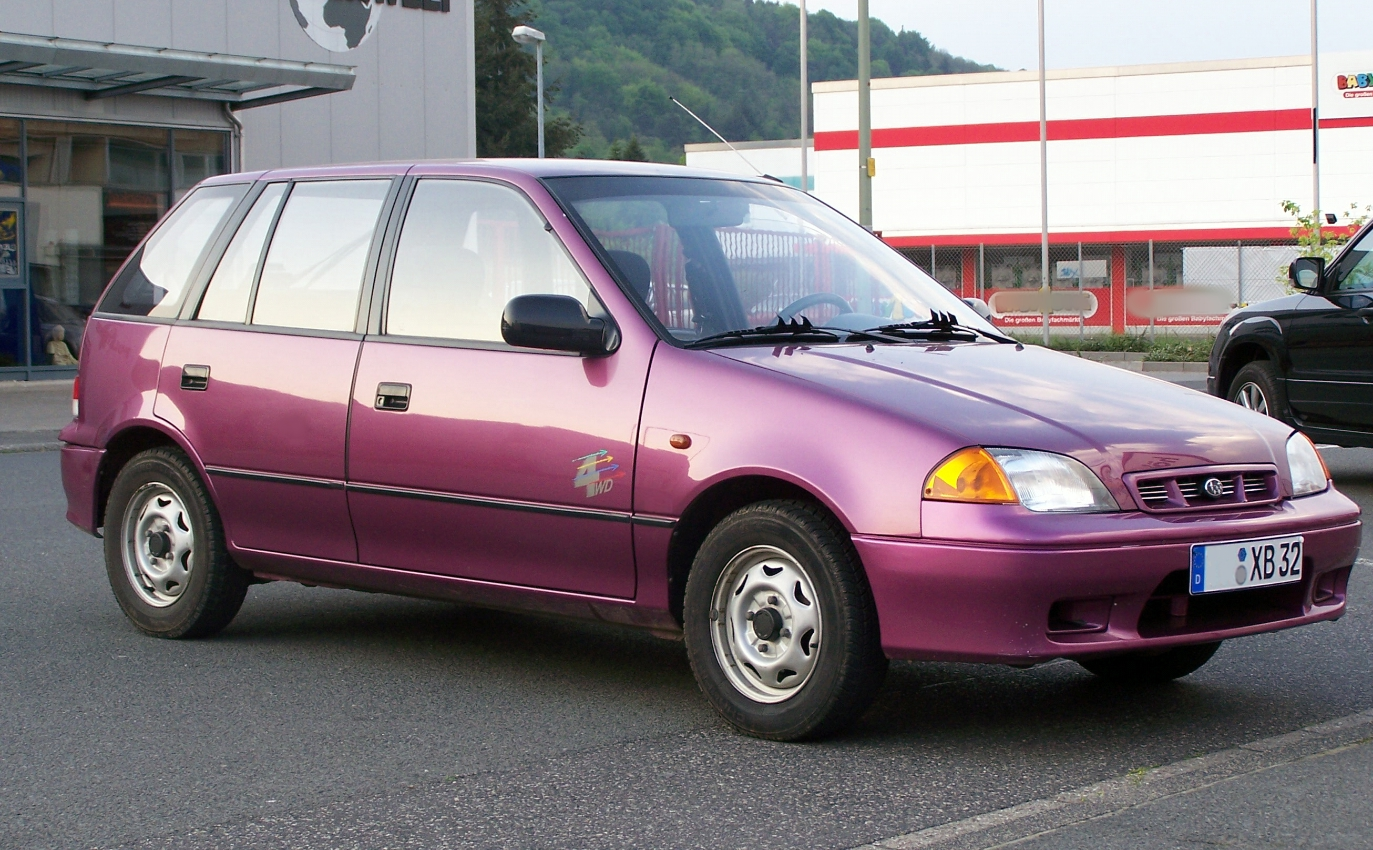
Euro-spec 2nd gen Subaru Justy (Suzuki Cultus-based)

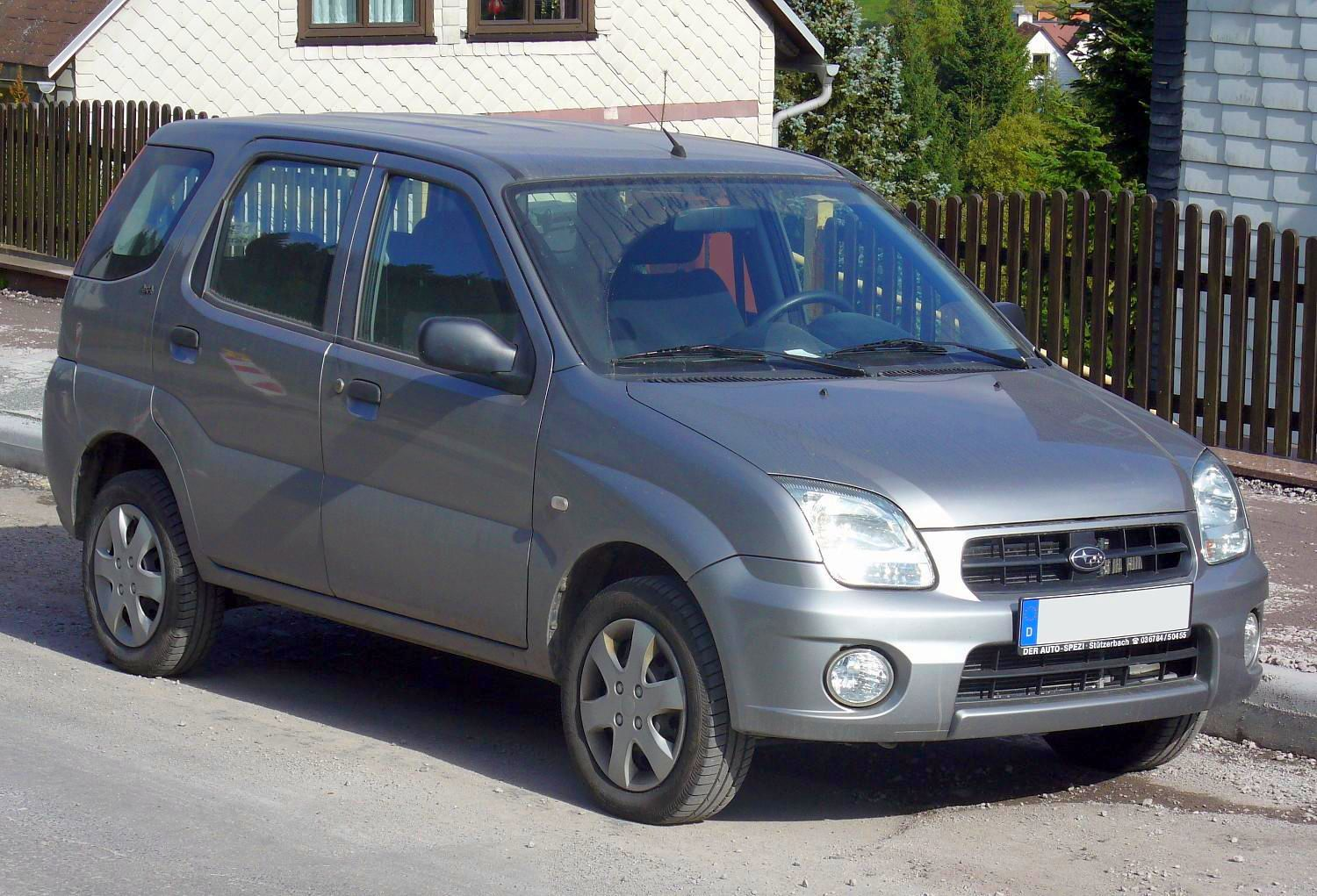
Euro-spec 3rd gen Subaru Justy (Suzuki Ignis-based)

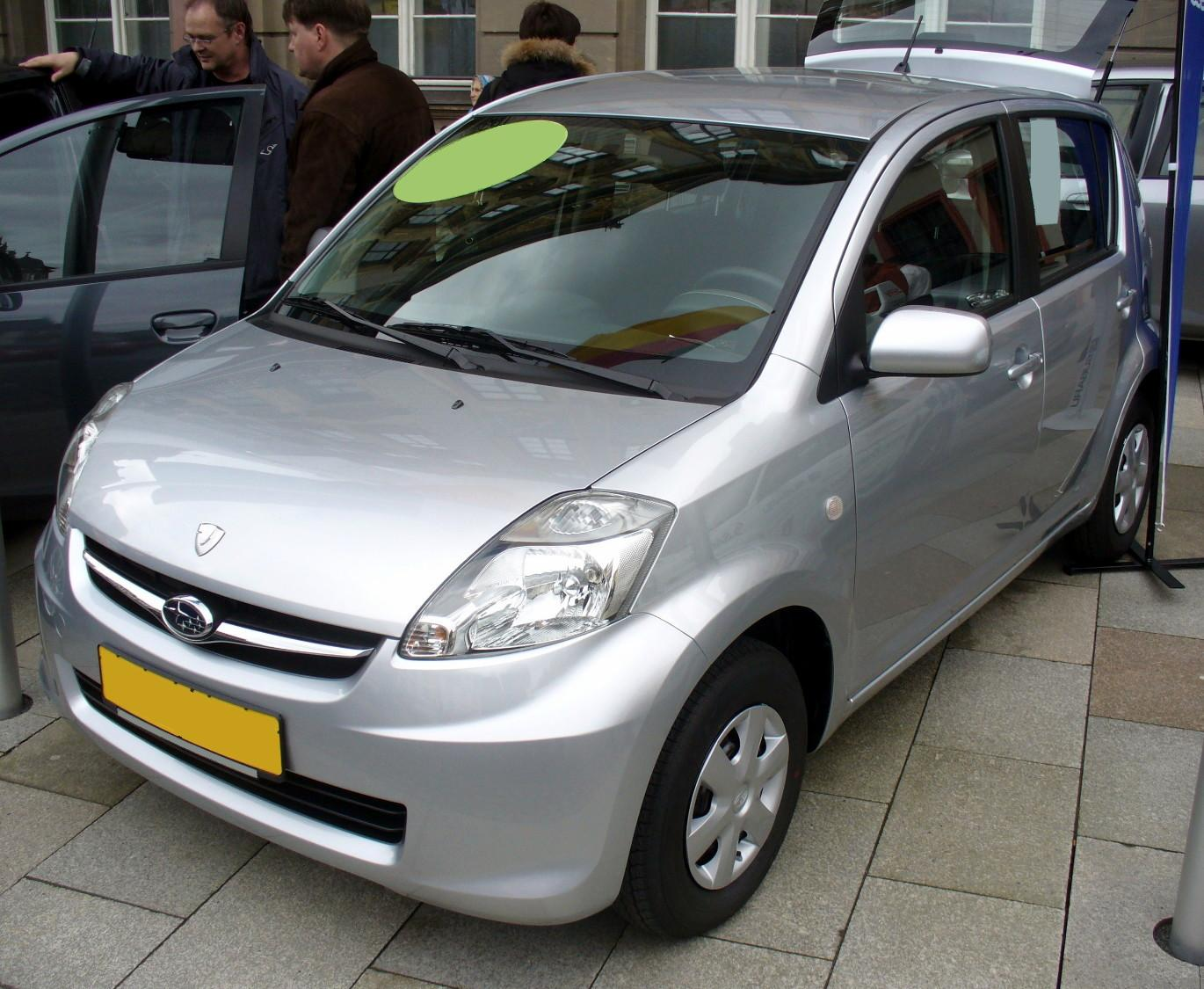
Euro-spec 4th gen Subaru Justy (Daihatsu Boon-based)

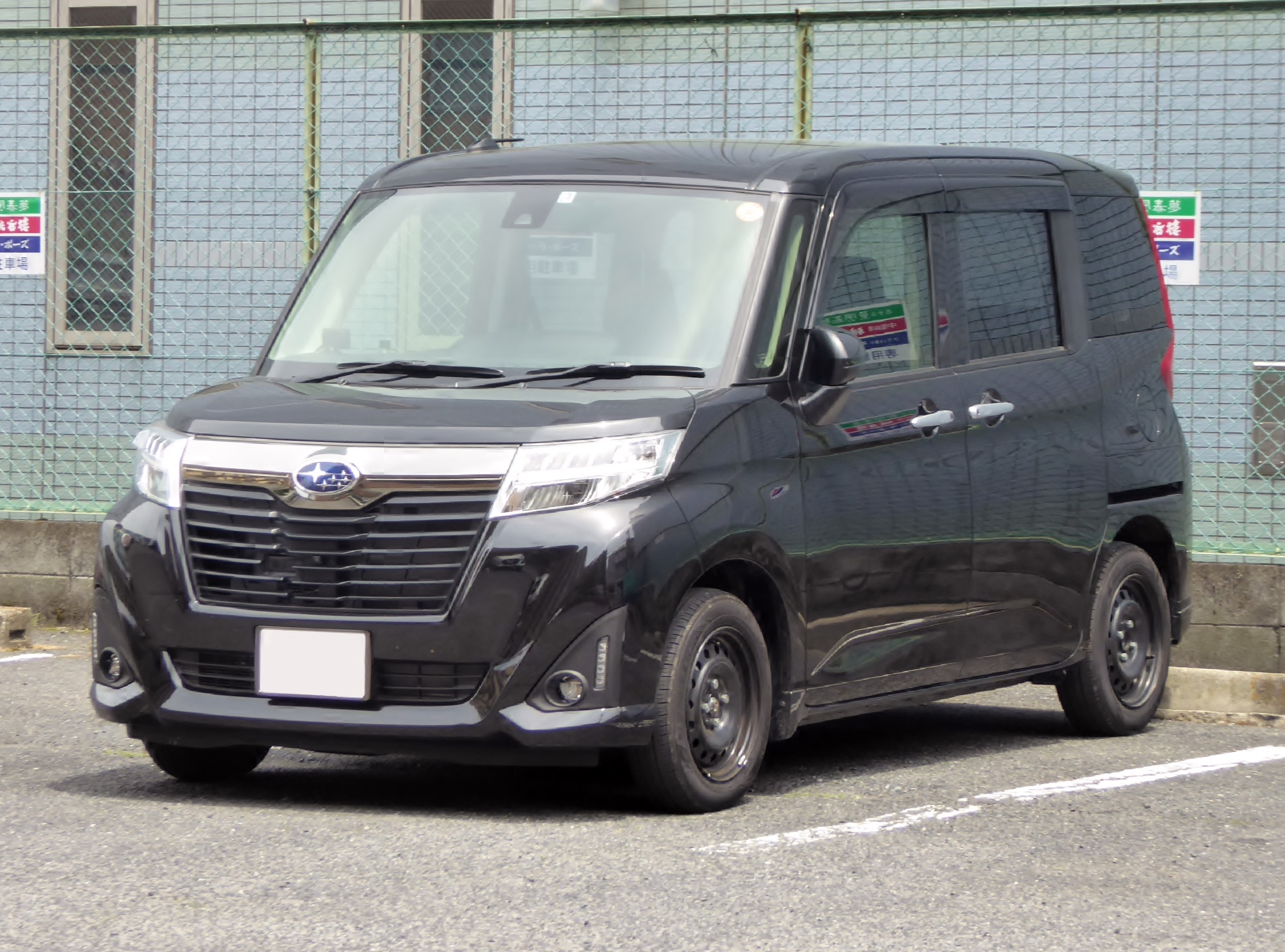
Japanese-spec 5th gen Subaru Justy (Daihatsu Thor-based)
