= Avid Catalina =

American homebuilt aircraft

Catalina
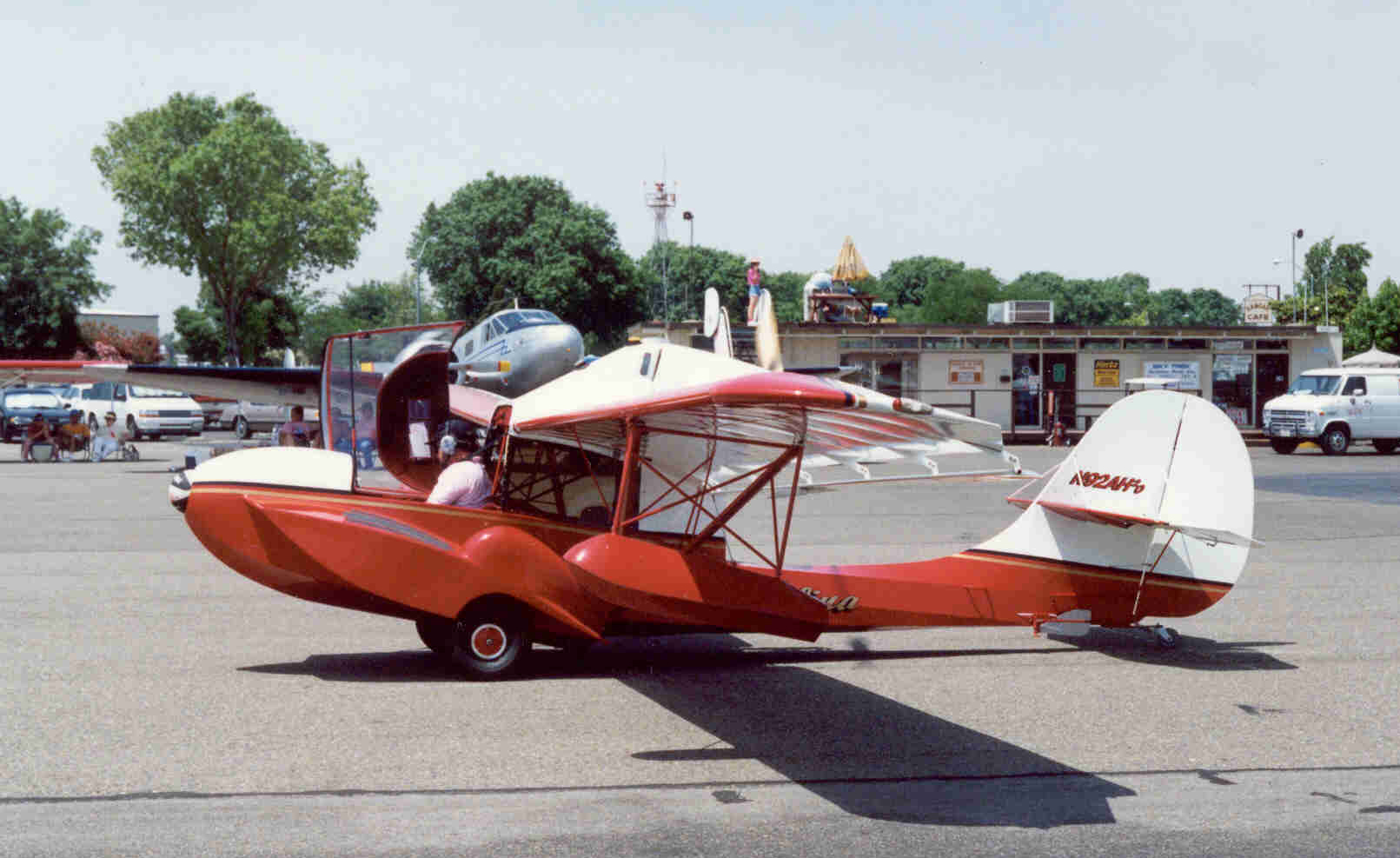
- Avid Amphibian

General information
- Type: Homebuilt aircraft
- National origin: United States
- Manufacturer: Avid Aircraft
- Status: Production completed (2003)
- Number built: 100 (Amphibian and Catalina, 2001)

History
- Introduction date: September 1994 (Catalina)

The Avid Catalina is an American homebuilt amphibious aircraft that was designed and produced by Avid Aircraft of Caldwell, Idaho. It is a development of the Avid Amphibian.

When it was available the aircraft was supplied as a kit, for amateur construction.

The Catalina was introduced in September 1994. Avid Aircraft ceased operations in November 2003 and Catalina production ended.

== Design and development ==
The Catalina features a strut-braced high-wing, a three-seat enclosed cabin, retractable conventional landing gear, a boat hull and a single engine in pusher configuration.

The aircraft is made from mixed construction, consisting of welded steel tubing, with its flying surfaces covered in doped aircraft fabric, plus fiberglass for the hull and other parts. Its 36.00 ft (11.0 m) span wing has a wing area of 150.00 sq ft (13.935 m^{2}) and folds for storage or ground transport, without disconnecting the controls. The wing is supported by "V" lift struts with jury struts. The Catalina wings had the option of mid-wing sponsons, or the original Amphibian droop wing tip sponsons for water operations.

The original engine used was the 64 hp (48 kW) Rotax 582 twin cylinder two stroke powerplant. Other known engines flown have included the Rotax 618, Rotax 912, Hirth F30, Hirth 2706 and Verner 133MK engines.

The Catalina has an empty weight of 600 lb (270 kg) and a gross weight of 1,200 lb (540 kg), giving a useful load of 600 lb (270 kg). With full fuel of 17.5 U.S. gallons (66 L; 14.6 imp gal) the payload is 495 lb (225 kg). While the 17.5 U.S. gallons (66 L; 14.6 imp gal) fuel tank is standard equipment, the factory also offered optional 31.5 U.S. gallons (119 L; 26.2 imp gal) and 45.5 U.S. gallons (172 L; 37.9 imp gal) tanks. The earlier Amphibian model offered only 17.5 U.S. gallons (66 L; 14.6 imp gal) standard fuel, with a total of 28 U.S. gallons (110 L; 23 imp gal) as two 14 U.S. gallons (53 L; 12 imp gal) tanks optional.

The Avid Amphibian and Catalina could also be built without water operations capability. This variation of the aircraft was dubbed the "Landphibian", and was lighter without the inboard and outboard sponsons. In 1992 the Amphibian kit cost US$16,695, while the land-only version kit was US$15,695.

The manufacturer estimated the construction time from the supplied kit as 700 hours.

== Operational history ==
By 2001 the company reported that 100 examples of the Amphibian/Catalina were flying.

In December 2013 eleven examples were registered in the United States with the Federal Aviation Administration.

One builder, Rod Snider, of Boise, Idaho, wrote, "I completed the land version of the Avid Amphibian in January of 1987. Since then I have flown this remarkable little plane for 1960 hours. It is really a superb plane for sightseeing and flying slow and camping in back country airstrips. Three people of medium build can be carried comfortably, as can two people and all necessary camping gear with full fuel." This aircraft was reported as destroyed in January 2004.

== Variants ==
Amphibian
Earlier version with turned down wingtips acting as tip floats
Catalina
Later version introduced in September 1994, with conventional wing-mounted floats.
Landphibian
Version with float gear removed.

== Specifications (Catalina) ==
Data from AeroCrafter

General characteristics

- Crew: one
- Capacity: two passengers
- Length: 19.40 ft (5.91 m)
- Wingspan: 36 ft 0 in (10.97 m)
- Wing area: 150 sq ft (14 m^{2})
- Empty weight: 600 lb (272 kg)
- Gross weight: 1,200 lb (544 kg)
- Fuel capacity: 17.5 U.S. gallons (66 L; 14.6 imp gal)
- Powerplant: 1 × Rotax 582 twin cylinder, liquid-cooled, two stroke aircraft engine, 65 hp (48 kW)
- Propellers: 2-bladed wooden

Performance

- Maximum speed: 90 mph (140 km/h, 78 kn)
- Cruise speed: 75 mph (121 km/h, 65 kn)
- Stall speed: 32 mph (51 km/h, 28 kn)
- Range: 364 mi (586 km, 316 nmi)
- Service ceiling: 12,500 ft (3,800 m)
- Rate of climb: 1,000 ft/min (5.1 m/s) while operated solo
- Wing loading: 8.0 lb/sq ft (39 kg/m^{2})
