= Airdale Backcountry =

American homebuilt aircraft

Backcountry

General information
- Type: Amateur-built aircraft
- National origin: United States
- Manufacturer: Airdale Flyer Company
- Designer: Brett McKinney
- Status: Production completed (2017)

History
- Developed from: Avid Mk IV

The Airdale Backcountry is an American amateur-built aircraft that was designed by Brett McKinney and based upon John Larsen's Avid Mk IV design. It was produced by Airdale Flyer Company, of Rhinelander, Wisconsin, but the company went out of business in 2017 and production ended. When it was available the aircraft was supplied as a kit for amateur construction.

== Design and development ==
The Backcountry features a strut-braced high-wing, a two-seats-in-side-by-side configuration enclosed cockpit with doors for access, fixed conventional landing gear and a single engine in tractor configuration.

The aircraft fuselage is made from welded 4130 steel tubing, while the wing is of aluminum construction, with all surfaces covered in doped aircraft fabric. Its 30 ft (9.1 m) span wing has an area of 123 sq ft (11.4 m^{2}) and flaperons. The Backcountry was designed to use the 100 hp (75 kW) Stratus EA 81 automotive conversion four-stroke powerplant.

The improvements over the Avid design include redesigning the aircraft to comply with the European Joint Aviation Requirements at a gross weight of 1,400 lb (635 kg), including stretching the fuselage by 16 in (41 cm), changing the main landing gear legs to aluminum gear with a track of 74 in (1.9 m), increasing the angle of the windshield, simplifying the control system and designing a differential flaperon system, redesigning the structure in the cockpit area to improve baggage access, adding new seats, increasing cockpit headroom and legroom, introducing wider cockpit doors and more cockpit width, modifying the tailwheel spring for more strength and designing a new engine cowling to accommodate the Subaru engine and other engine designs.

The company also offered a conversion kit for existing Mk IVs.

== Specifications (Backcountry) ==
Data from Bayerl and Kitplanes

General characteristics

- Crew: one
- Capacity: one passenger
- Length: 18 ft 10 in (5.74 m)
- Wingspan: 30 ft 0 in (9.14 m)
- Wing area: 122.7 sq ft (11.40 m^{2})
- Empty weight: 700 lb (318 kg)
- Gross weight: 1,400 lb (635 kg)
- Fuel capacity: 28 U.S. gallons (110 L; 23 imp gal)
- Powerplant: 1 × Subaru EA-81 four cylinder, air-cooled, four stroke automotive engine, 100 hp (75 kW)

Performance

- Maximum speed: 120 mph (190 km/h, 100 kn)
- Cruise speed: 107 mph (173 km/h, 93 kn)
- Stall speed: 37 mph (59 km/h, 32 kn)
- Rate of climb: 1,200 ft/min (6 m/s)
- Wing loading: 11.4 lb/sq ft (55.6 kg/m^{2})
