= List of Subaru engines =

Subaru uses a four or five character code to identify all of their engines. As of August 2022 these are the engines presently in models sold by Subaru

- FB20D: 1995 cc DOHC, 2017+ Subaru Impreza, and 2018+ Subaru Crosstrek
- FB25D: 2498 cc DOHC, 2019+ North American Subaru Forester, 2020+ North American Subaru Legacy, 2020+ North American Subaru Outback, and 2021+ North American Subaru Crosstrek
- FA24D: 2,387 cc DOHC, 2022+ Subaru BRZ/Toyota 86
- FA24F: 2,387 cc DOHC, turbo, 2019+ USDM Subaru Ascent, 2020+ Subaru Legacy, and 2020+ Subaru Outback. 2021+ USDM Subaru WRX
- CB18: 1795 cc DOHC, 2020 JDM Subaru Levorg, 2021 JDM Subaru Forester

== Two-cylinder ==
=== Subaru EK engine ===
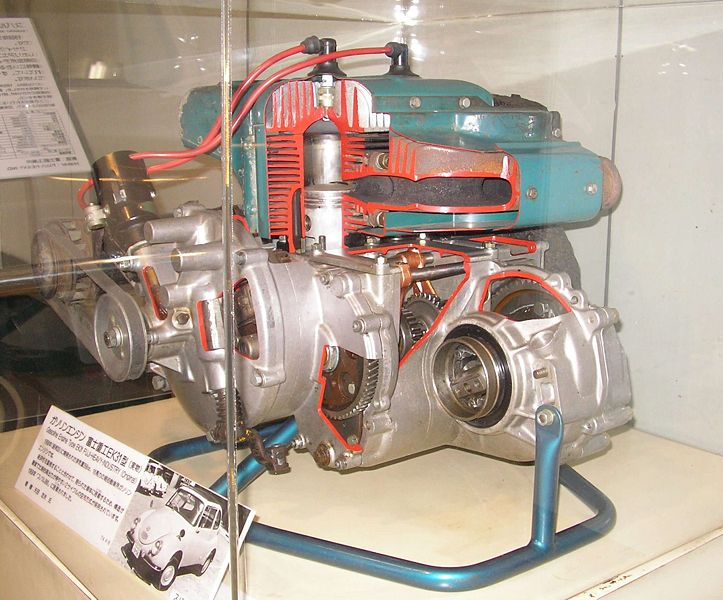
EK31

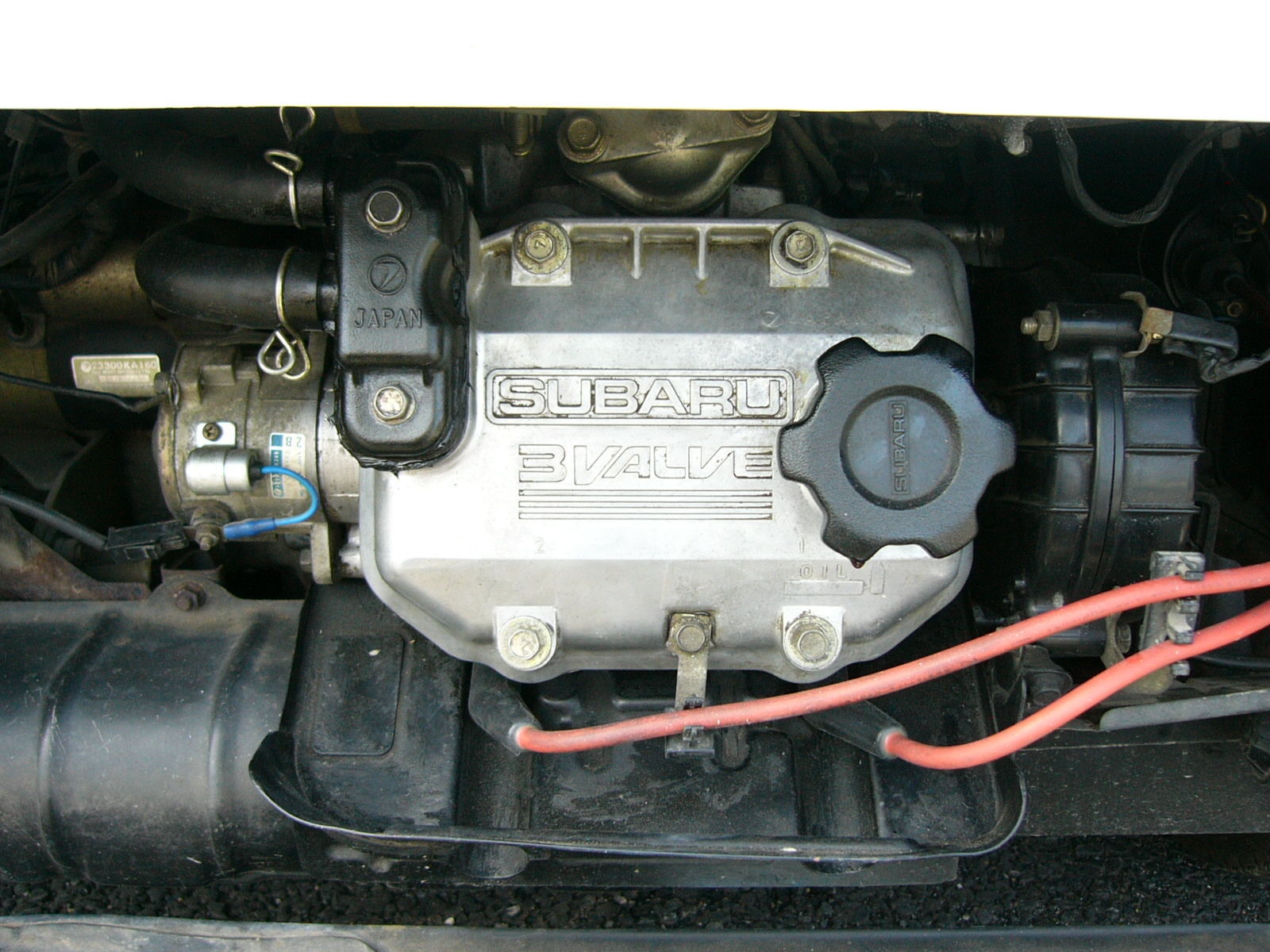
The late 1980s EK23, with three valves per cylinder

The EK series was an inline twin cylinder engine. Early versions were air-cooled two-stroke cycle, later replaced with water-cooled configurations in 1971. The engine was upgraded to a four-stroke SOHC in 1973 to meet Japanese Government emission regulations, using the SEEC emissions system (later SEEC-T), with an alloy block and head.

The (Japanese: Subaru EK series) was used from 1958 until 1989 in most Kei car models.

Subaru EK engine summary
Cooling	Stroke	Name	Displacement	Bore × Stroke	Output		Compression Ratio	Applications
Air	Two	EK31	356 cm^{3} (21.7 cu in)	61.5 mm × 60.0 mm (2.42 in × 2.36 in)	16 PS (12 kW; 16 hp) at 4,500 rpm	May 1958–Feb 1960	6.5:1	Subaru 360 (1958–68); Sambar (1961–70)
Air	Two	EK31	356 cm^{3} (21.7 cu in)	61.5 mm × 60.0 mm (2.42 in × 2.36 in)	18 PS (13 kW; 18 hp) at 4,700 rpm	Feb 1960–Jul 1964	6.5:1	Subaru 360 (1958–68); Sambar (1961–70)
Air	Two	EK31	356 cm^{3} (21.7 cu in)	61.5 mm × 60.0 mm (2.42 in × 2.36 in)	20 PS (15 kW; 20 hp) at 5,000 rpm	Jul 1964–Aug 1968	6.5:1	Subaru 360 (1958–68); Sambar (1961–70)
Air	Two	EK51	423 cm^{3} (25.8 cu in)	67.0 mm × 60.0 mm (2.64 in × 2.36 in)	23 PS (17 kW; 23 hp) at 5,000 rpm		6.5:1	Subaru 450 (MAIA) Japan & North America (1960–66)
Air	Two	EK32	356 cm^{3} (21.7 cu in)	61.5 mm × 60.0 mm (2.42 in × 2.36 in)	25 PS (18 kW; 25 hp) at 5,500 rpm	Aug 1968–1970	7.5:1	Subaru 360 and 360 Young SS (1968-70)
Air	Two	EK32	356 cm^{3} (21.7 cu in)	61.5 mm × 60.0 mm (2.42 in × 2.36 in)	36 PS (26 kW; 36 hp) at 7,000 rpm	Nov 1968–1970		Subaru 360 and 360 Young SS (1968-70)
Air	Two	EK33	356 cm^{3} (21.7 cu in)	61.5 mm × 60.0 mm (2.42 in × 2.36 in)	26 PS (19 kW; 26 hp) at 5,800 rpm	R-2 Van K41, Sambar K55/K64	6.5:1	Subaru R-2 (1969–71); Subaru Sambar (1970–73)
Air	Two	EK33	356 cm^{3} (21.7 cu in)	61.5 mm × 60.0 mm (2.42 in × 2.36 in)	30 PS (22 kW; 30 hp) at 6,500 rpm	R-2	6.5:1	Subaru R-2 (1969–71); Subaru Sambar (1970–73)
Air	Two	EK33	356 cm^{3} (21.7 cu in)	61.5 mm × 60.0 mm (2.42 in × 2.36 in)	36 PS (26 kW; 36 hp) at 7,000 rpm	R-2 SS	7.5:1	Subaru R-2 (1969–71); Subaru Sambar (1970–73)
Air	Two	EK33	356 cm^{3} (21.7 cu in)	61.5 mm × 60.0 mm (2.42 in × 2.36 in)	32 PS (24 kW; 32 hp) at 6,500 rpm	R-2 Sport Edition	7.5:1	Subaru R-2 (1969–71); Subaru Sambar (1970–73)
Water	Two	EK34	356 cm^{3} (21.7 cu in)	61.5 mm × 60.0 mm (2.42 in × 2.36 in)	28 PS (21 kW; 28 hp) at 5,500 rpm	Sambar K71/K72/K81	6.5:1	Subaru R-2 1971.10-1972.07; Subaru Rex 1972.07-1973.10; Subaru Sambar 1973.02-1976.02
Water	Two	EK34	356 cm^{3} (21.7 cu in)	61.5 mm × 60.0 mm (2.42 in × 2.36 in)	32 PS (24 kW; 32 hp) at 6,000 rpm	R-2, Rex	6.5:1	Subaru R-2 1971.10-1972.07; Subaru Rex 1972.07-1973.10; Subaru Sambar 1973.02-1976.02
Water	Two	EK34	356 cm^{3} (21.7 cu in)	61.5 mm × 60.0 mm (2.42 in × 2.36 in)	35 PS (26 kW; 35 hp) at 6,500 rpm	Rex TS	6.5:1	Subaru R-2 1971.10-1972.07; Subaru Rex 1972.07-1973.10; Subaru Sambar 1973.02-1976.02
Water	Two	EK34	356 cm^{3} (21.7 cu in)	61.5 mm × 60.0 mm (2.42 in × 2.36 in)	36 PS (26 kW; 36 hp) at 7,000 rpm	R-2 GSS	6.5:1	Subaru R-2 1971.10-1972.07; Subaru Rex 1972.07-1973.10; Subaru Sambar 1973.02-1976.02
Water	Two	EK34	356 cm^{3} (21.7 cu in)	61.5 mm × 60.0 mm (2.42 in × 2.36 in)	37 PS (27 kW; 36 hp) at 6,500 rpm	Rex GSR	6.5:1	Subaru R-2 1971.10-1972.07; Subaru Rex 1972.07-1973.10; Subaru Sambar 1973.02-1976.02
Water	Four	EK21	358 cm^{3} (21.8 cu in)	66.0 mm × 52.4 mm (2.60 in × 2.06 in)	31 PS (23 kW; 31 hp) at 8,000 rpm	Rex 73.10-75.12	9.5:1	Subaru Rex K22 1973.10–1976.05; Subaru Sambar 1976.02–1976.05
Water	Four	EK21	358 cm^{3} (21.8 cu in)	66.0 mm × 52.4 mm (2.60 in × 2.06 in)	28 PS (21 kW; 28 hp) at 7,500 rpm	Rex Van K42, Wagon K26, Rex sedan 75.12-76.05	9.5:1	Subaru Rex K22 1973.10–1976.05; Subaru Sambar 1976.02–1976.05
Water	Four	EK22 (Note: SEEC-T emissions system)	490 cm^{3} (30 cu in)	74.0 mm × 57.0 mm (2.91 in × 2.24 in)	28 PS (21 kW; 28 hp)	Rex 5 Van K43, Sambar 5 K75/76/85	9.0:1	Subaru Rex 1976.05–1977.05; Subaru Sambar 5 1976.05–1977.03
Water	Four	EK22	490 cm^{3} (30 cu in)	74.0 mm × 57.0 mm (2.91 in × 2.24 in)	31 PS (23 kW; 31 hp) at 6,500 rpm	Rex 5 K23	9.0:1	Subaru Rex 1976.05–1977.05; Subaru Sambar 5 1976.05–1977.03
Water	Four	EK23 (2V) (Note: Two valves per cylinder)	544 cm^{3} (33.2 cu in)	76.0 mm × 60.0 mm (2.99 in × 2.36 in)	31 PS (23 kW; 31 hp) at 6,200 rpm	Rex	8.5:1	Subaru Rex (1977.05–1989); Subaru Sambar (1977–90)
Water	Four	EK23 (2V)	544 cm^{3} (33.2 cu in)	76.0 mm × 60.0 mm (2.99 in × 2.36 in)	28 PS (21 kW; 28 hp) at 6,200 rpm	Rex Van, Sambar	8.5:1	Subaru Rex (1977.05–1989); Subaru Sambar (1977–90)
Water	Four	EK23 (2V)	544 cm^{3} (33.2 cu in)	76.0 mm × 60.0 mm (2.99 in × 2.36 in)	31 PS (23 kW; 31 hp) at 6,000 rpm	Rex 2nd gen & Rex Combi	8.5:1	Subaru Rex (1977.05–1989); Subaru Sambar (1977–90)
Water	Four	EK23 (2V)	544 cm^{3} (33.2 cu in)	76.0 mm × 60.0 mm (2.99 in × 2.36 in)	30 PS (22 kW; 30 hp) at 6,000 rpm	Rex 3rd gen	8.5:1	Subaru Rex (1977.05–1989); Subaru Sambar (1977–90)
Water	Four	EK23 (3V) (Note: Three valves per cylinder: two intake, one exhaust)	544 cm^{3} (33.2 cu in)	76.0 mm × 60.0 mm (2.99 in × 2.36 in)	34 PS (25 kW; 34 hp) at 6,000 rpm	Sambar	9.0:1	Subaru Rex Viki (1986–89); Subaru Sambar (1989–90)
Water	Four	EK23 (3V)	544 cm^{3} (33.2 cu in)	76.0 mm × 60.0 mm (2.99 in × 2.36 in)	36 PS (26 kW; 36 hp) at 7,000 rpm	Rex	9.0:1	Subaru Rex Viki (1986–89); Subaru Sambar (1989–90)
Water	Four	EK23 (2V-T) (Note: Turbocharged: Hitachi-made, 36 mm turbines)	544 cm^{3} (33.2 cu in)	76.0 mm × 60.0 mm (2.99 in × 2.36 in)	41 PS (30 kW; 40 hp) at 6,000 rpm		8.5:1	Subaru Rex Combi (1983–86)
Water	Four	EK23 (3V)	544 cm^{3} (33.2 cu in)	76.0 mm × 60.0 mm (2.99 in × 2.36 in)	36 PS (26 kW; 36 hp) at 7,000 rpm		9.0:1	Subaru Rex VX (1986–89)
Water	Four	EK23 (SC) (Note: Supercharged, water-cooled intercooler)	544 cm^{3} (33.2 cu in)	76.0 mm × 60.0 mm (2.99 in × 2.36 in)	55 PS (40 kW; 54 hp) at 6,400 rpm		9.0:1	Subaru Rex Supercharger (1988–89)
Water	Four	EK42	665 cm^{3} (40.6 cu in)	78.0 mm × 69.6 mm (3.07 in × 2.74 in)	31 PS (23 kW; 31 hp)	700	9.5:1	Subaru Rex and Sambar/700 (export only, 1982–89)
Water	Four	EK42	665 cm^{3} (40.6 cu in)	78.0 mm × 69.6 mm (3.07 in × 2.74 in)	37 PS (27 kW; 36 hp) at 6,400 rpm	low octane version	9.5:1	Subaru Rex and Sambar/700 (export only, 1982–89)
Water	Four	EK42	665 cm^{3} (40.6 cu in)	78.0 mm × 69.6 mm (3.07 in × 2.74 in)	35 PS (26 kW; 35 hp) at 6,400 rpm	M70, Mini Jumbo, Sherpa (high octane version)	9.5:1	Subaru Rex and Sambar/700 (export only, 1982–89)

== Three-cylinder ==
The EF series engine is a liquid-cooled three-cylinder, four-stroke, with SOHC. It is not compliant with Japanese Government regulations concerning displacement of kei cars with a current maximum limit of 660 cc. The EF appeared while the EK was being replaced by the EN05.

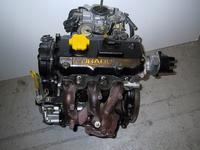
Subaru EF-12 Engine

=== Subaru EF engine ===
- EF10: Bore x Stroke mm = 78.0 x 69.6
- Piston displacement = 997 cc
- Compression ratio = 9.5:1
- Two valves per cylinder

SOHC 2V, 55 hp at 5,200 rpm 1984–1987 Subaru Justy

- EF12:Bore x Stroke mm = 78.0 x 83.0
- Piston displacement = 1189 cc
- Compression ratio = 9.1:1
- Three valves per cylinder

SOHC 3V, 66-73 hp 1987–1994 Subaru Justy

== Four-cylinder ==
All of Subaru's four-cylinder engines (except the EN series) are liquid-cooled, horizontally opposed boxer four-strokes.

=== Subaru EA engine ===
The EA was used from 1966 until 1994 in most models. It is a basic two-valve-per-cylinder design with siamese ports, or one port that is directly next to another, and three main crankshaft main bearings. Engines with overhead camshafts were installed with two timing belts, whereas vehicles with overhead valves used timing gears exclusively.

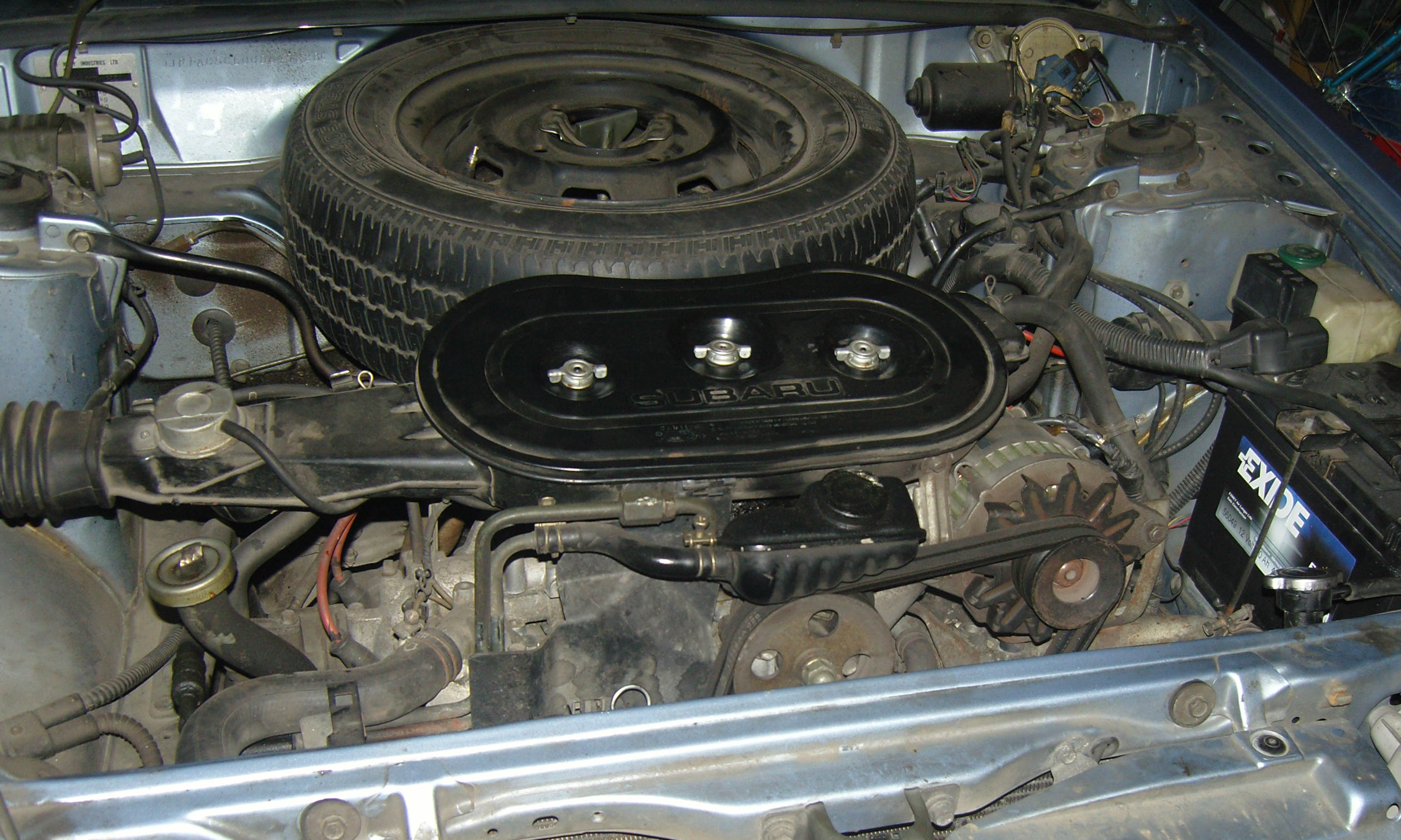
Subaru EA82 Engine

- EA52: 977 cc OHV, 55 hp at 6,000 rpm used in the 1966–1971 Subaru 1000
- EA61: 1088.8 cc OHV, 62 hp at 6,400 rpm used in the 1970–1972 Subaru FF-1 Star and Subaru G
- EA62: 1267.5 cc OHV, 80 hp at 6,400 rpm used in the 1971–1972 Subaru G
- EA63: 1362 cc OHV, 58 hp at 5,200 rpm used in the 1973–1976 Subaru Leone
- EA71: 1595 cc OHV, 67 hp at 5,200 rpm or 68 at 4,800 rpm used in the 1976–1987 Subaru Leone and 1978–1980 Subaru BRAT/brumby
- EA81: 1781 cc OHV, 73 hp at 4,800 rpm used in the 1980–1984 Subaru Leone and 1981–1993 Subaru BRAT/brumby
- EA81T: 1781 cc OHV Turbo, 95 hp at 4,200 rpm used in the 1983–1984 Subaru Leone and Subaru BRAT/brumby
- EA82: 1791 cc SOHC, 84-97 hp used in the Subaru Leone and Subaru XT
- EA82T: 1791 cc SOHC, 136 hp at 5200 rpm used in the Subaru Leone and Subaru XT

=== Subaru EE engine (diesel) ===
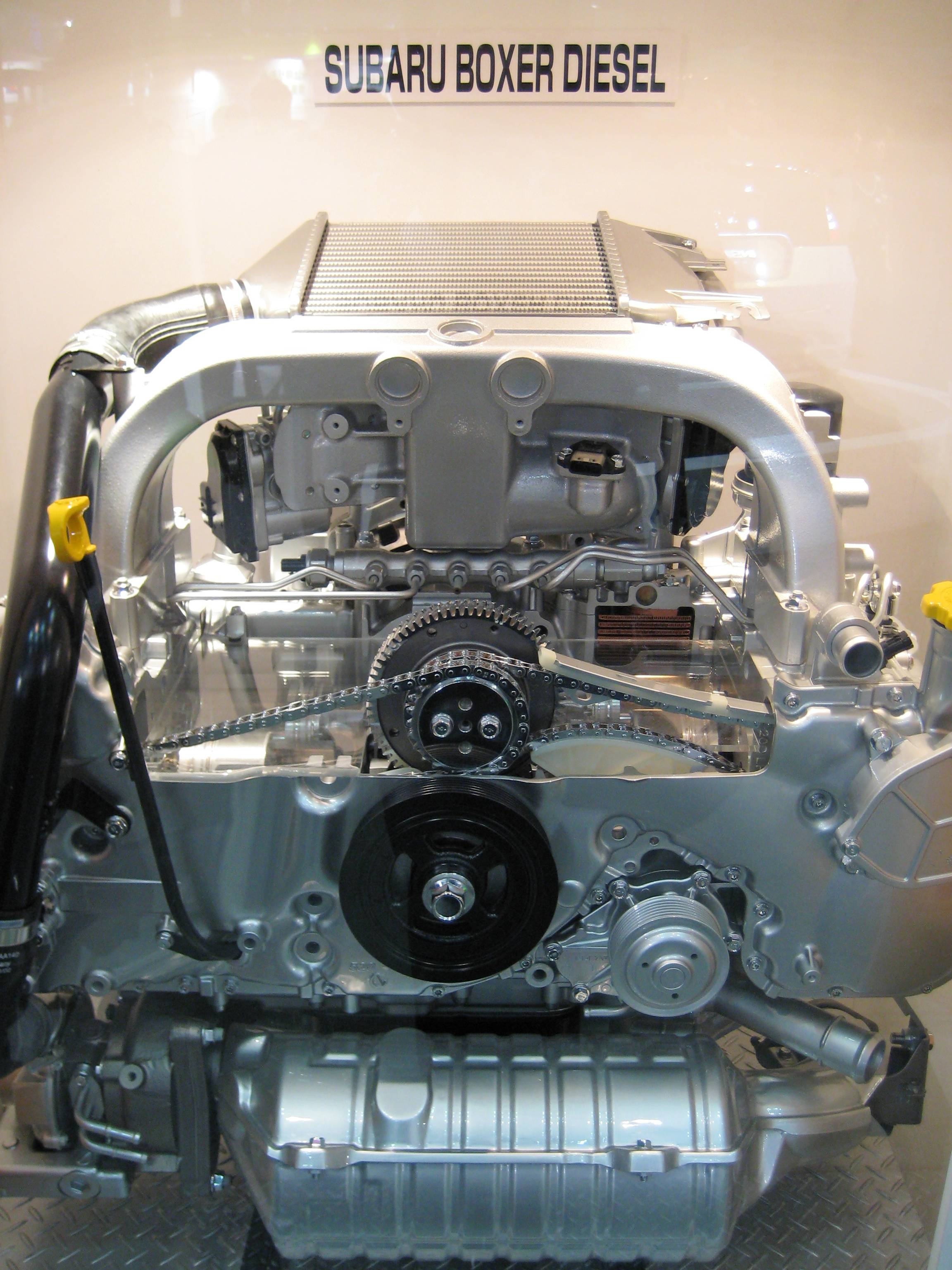
Subaru EE20 (2008)

Subaru unveiled the world's first boxer diesel engine to be fitted in a passenger car at the Geneva Auto Show in 2007. This 2.0L DOHC engine, designated the EE20, has an output of 110 kW (150 PS; 150 hp) at 3600 rpm and develops 350 N⋅m (36 kg⋅m; 260 lb⋅ft) of torque at 1800 rpm, with a redline of 4750 rpm. The engine has a total displacement of 1,998 cc (122 cu in) from a square 86 mm × 86 mm (3.4 in × 3.4 in) bore x stroke with a compression ratio of 16.3:1 and uses five main bearings. The EE20 shares a bore pitch dimension and assembly line with the EZ30 at the Ooizumi Factory; compared to the contemporaneous gasoline EJ20, which has a similar displacement, the EE20 is 61.3 mm (2.41 in) shorter.

The common rail solenoid injector is manufactured by Denso and operates at 180 MPa (26,000 psi). The IHI variable geometry turbo is mounted under the right side of the engine, close to the exhaust manifold, reducing turbo lag. For the Legacy 2.0D, Subaru claimed consumption improved by 15 to 20% (ranging from 6.4 to 5.6 L/100 km (37 to 42 mpg_{‑US})) and that CO_{2} emissions fell from 202 to 148 g/km (0.72 to 0.53 lb/mi) compared to the similar model with a gasoline engine.

Fuji Heavy Industries (FHI) spent three years starting in fall 2005 developing the EE20 after concluding the marque needed a diesel engine to compete in Europe. Details about the engine were first released in February 2008, after an additional preview at Frankfurt in 2007, and an official announcement of applications was made at Geneva in March 2008.

The EE20 was originally released with Euro-4 emissions compliance; an oxidation catalyst and diesel particulate filter are mounted close to the turbo, using heat from exhaust gases, and the exhaust gas recirculation system is water-cooled to meet regulations. The compliance was soon updated to Euro-5 and Euro-6 in 2015.

Availability

Per the March 2008 announcement at Geneva, the EE20 was sold in Legacy (wagon and sedan) and Outback vehicles for the European market; the diesel was only offered with a manual transmission at first, and the clutch and flywheel were specifically modified for diesel use. In September 2008, FHI announced the EE20 would be available as a slightly modified variant (the diesel particulate filter was now closed) in Forester and Impreza models sold in Europe starting that fall. For the Forester, output was reduced slightly to 108 kW (147 PS; 145 bhp).

The EE20 was offered with the Impreza XV at that model's launch in 2010. The Subaru continuously variable transmission (branded Lineartronic) was offered as an option for EE20-equipped Outback models starting in 2013, and sales of the Lineartronic EE20 Outback would start in Australia later in 2013. At Geneva 2013, the diesel boxer was combined with three electric motors to form the hybrid powertrain of the Subaru VIZIV Concept. The Lineartronic EE20 powertrain was added to the Forester in 2015.

In 2016, citing increasingly stringent emissions standards, the project manager for the Impreza stated that further development of the EE20 had been halted. In September 2017, Subaru announced production of diesel automobiles would end by 2020; at the time, sales were approximately 15,000 diesel-powered cars annually in Europe and Australia. The capacity gained would be used to start producing plug-in hybrids in 2018 and electric vehicles by 2021. At Geneva in March 2018, Subaru UK confirmed its parent company's plans to discontinue diesel production, but had enough stock on hand to meet projected demand through the end of 2018.

=== Subaru EJ engine ===
The EJ engine was introduced in the 1989 Subaru Legacy to replace the EA engines. It was designed from scratch with five main crankshaft bearings and four valves per cylinder and can be either SOHC or DOHC and one timing belt. The fifth digit is the only way to tell without seeing the engine.

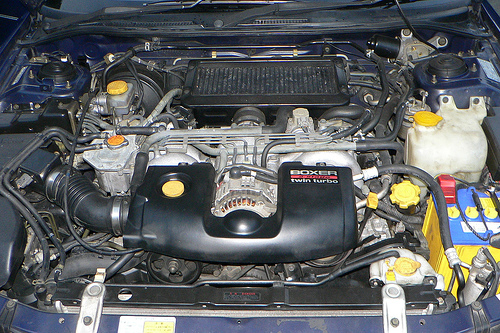
Subaru EJ20G twin turbo

- EJ15: 1483.4 cc SOHC, 1990–2003 JDM Subaru Impreza
- EJ16: 90 hp at 5,600 rpm used in the 1993–2006 Subaru Impreza
- EJ18: 1820 cc SOHC 110 hp at 5,600 rpm used in the 1993–1996 Subaru Impreza and Euro and JDM Subaru Legacy
- EJ20: 1994.3 cc, available in Australia, Europe and Japan naturally aspirated at 115–190 hp and with a Turbo 220–280 hp used on Most Models, (2002–2005 WRX in the United States)
- EJ22: 2212 cc, 135–280 hp used in the 1989–2001 Subaru Impreza and Subaru Legacy
- EJ25: 2457 cc, 165–320 hp found in Most Models 1995–2021
- EJ30: Special limited engine. Four were built by Subaru, but only 3 remain in working condition. There is no readily available technical or power information on these engines.

Generally the EJ-series can be divided into two versions: the Phase I engines (1989–1998) and the Phase II engines (1999–2010). The Phase II engines featured new cylinder heads and crankshafts with the thrust bearing located at crank bearing #5 instead of #3. The designation also changed from Phase I to Phase II. All Phase I engines have an alphanumerical suffix behind the standard EJXX designation, all Phase II engines have a numerical suffix behind the EJXX designation. Example:

Phase I: EJ15E, EJ15J, EJ16E, EJ18E, EJ20B, EJ20D, EJ20E, EJ20G, EJ20H, EJ20J, EJ20R, EJ20K, EJ22E, EJ221, EJ25D

Phase II: EJ151, EJ161, EJ181, EJ201, EJ202, EJ203, EJ204, EJ205, EJ206, EJ207, EJ208, EJ222, EJ251, EJ252, EJ253, EJ254, EJ255, EJ257, EJ20X, EJ20Y

- There's at least 3 exceptions from this rule - MY'07 EJ20F engine. Most likely F stands for bi-Fuel (engines prepared for LPG). This engine model has reinforced engine valves. This is unconfirmed info, based only on users' experience and observations. JDM Legacy GT EJ20X and EJ20Y engines are also exceptions.

=== Subaru EL engine/Boxer type 3 ===
The (Japanese: Subaru EL engine) replaced the EJ15 and is used in the JDM Subaru Impreza 1.5R (series GD, GG, GE, GH) starting with model year 2006. It is based on the EJ engine and shares many components, like the crankshaft from the EJ25. It has DOHC cylinder heads with AVCS variable valve timing on the intake.

- Displacement: 1,498 cc
- bore x stroke: 77.7 x 79 mm
- compression ratio: 10.1:1
- maximum horsepower: 110ps (81 kW) at 6,400 RPM
- maximum torque: 14.7kgm (144Nm) at 3,200 rpm
- AVCS

=== Subaru EN engine ===
The Subaru EN inline-four engine was introduced in 1988 to replace the straight-two EK series engine that was originally engineered as an air-cooled engine, then modified as a water-cooled engine used in the 1969–1972 Subaru R-2. The EN was used in all kei cars and kei trucks in production by Subaru up until 2012.

=== Subaru FA engine ===
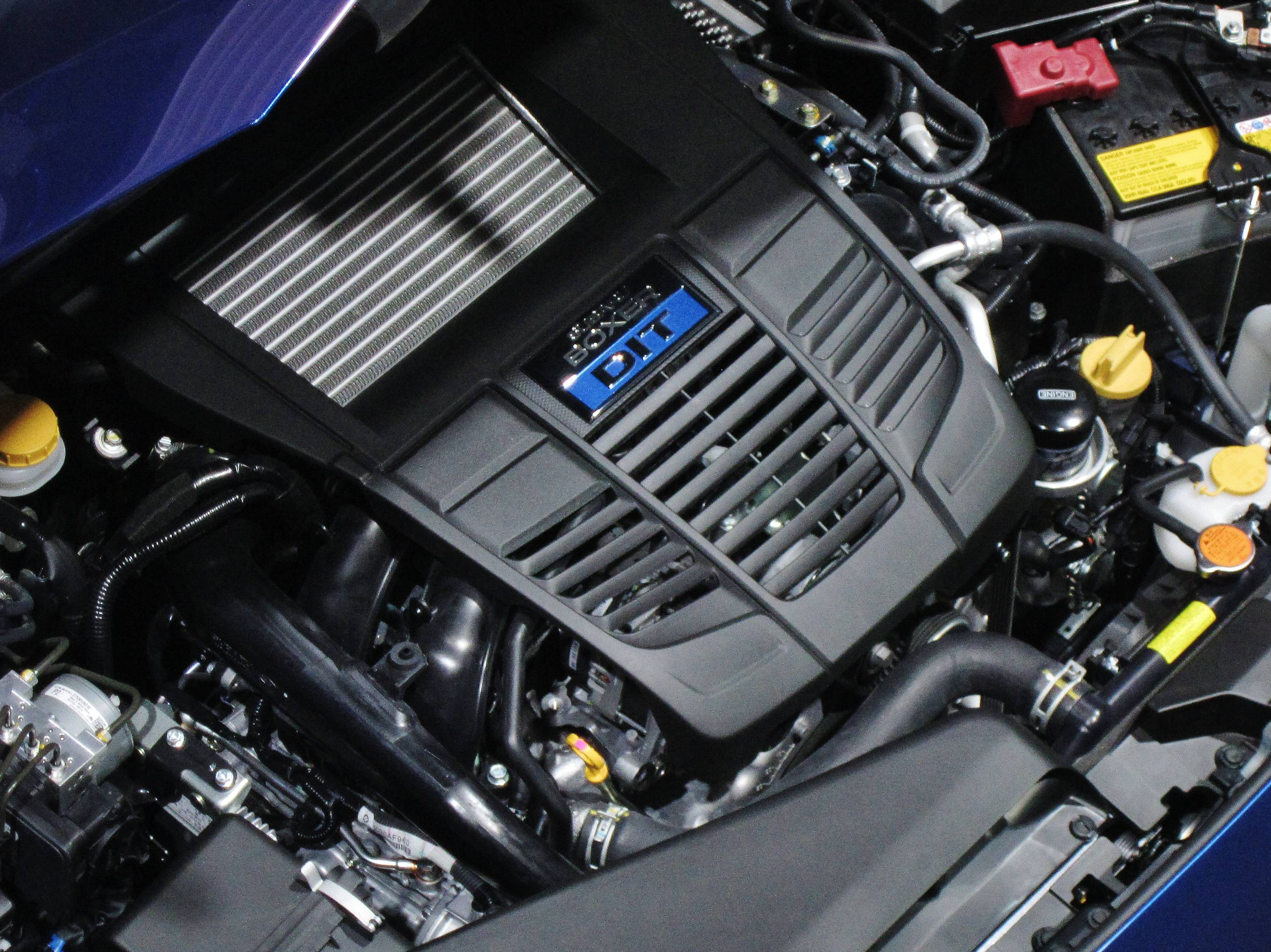
Subaru FA20F

(Japanese: Subaru FA engine) The FA was developed from the FB engine, however, efforts to reduce weight while maintaining durability were the main goals of the FA engine. While the FA and FB engines share a common platform, the FA shares very little in dedicated parts with the FB engine, with a different block, head, connecting rods, and pistons.

- FA20D: 1,998 cc DOHC, aka Toyota 4U-GSE; 2013-21 Subaru BRZ/Toyota 86
- FA20F: 1,998 cc DOHC, turbo, 2012+ JDM Subaru Legacy 2.0GT DIT and 2014+ Subaru Levorg; 2014+ USDM and JDM Subaru Forester XT; 2015-21 USDM Subaru WRX
- FA24D: 2,387 cc DOHC, 2022+ Subaru BRZ/Toyota 86
- FA24F: 2,387 cc DOHC, turbo, 2019+ USDM Subaru Ascent, 2020+ Subaru Legacy, and 2020+ Subaru Outback. 2022+ USDM Subaru WRX

=== Subaru FB engine ===
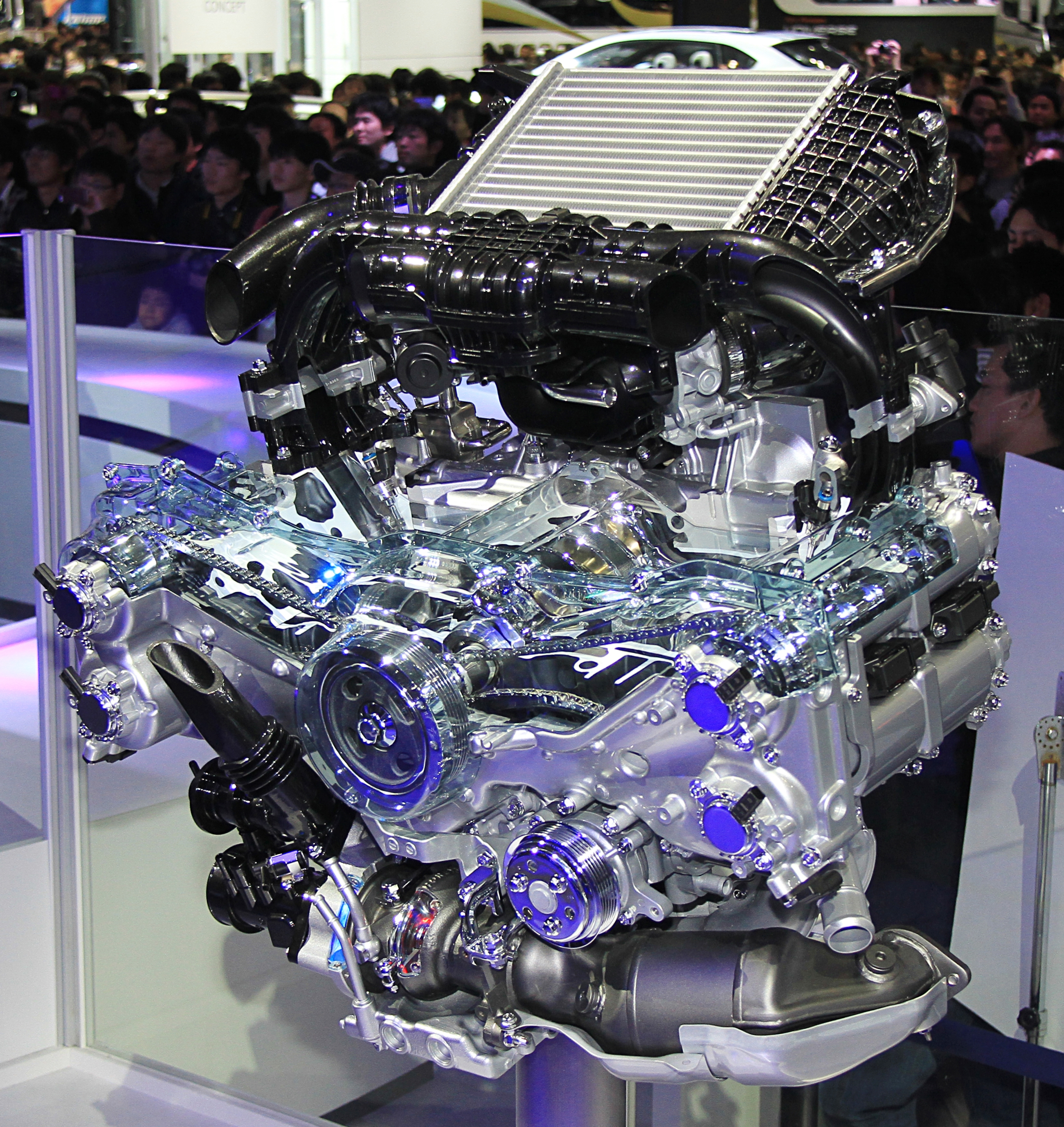
Subaru FB16F

The FB-series (initially available as naturally aspirated engines in 2.5- and 2.0-litre displacements) is the first new generation of boxer engine since the EJ-series. Subaru announced details of the FB engine on 23 September 2010. By increasing piston stroke and decreasing piston bore, Subaru aimed to reduce emissions and improve fuel economy, while increasing and broadening torque output over the previous generation engine.

The FB has an all-new block and head featuring dual overhead cams with intake and exhaust variable valve timing (AVCS - Active Valve Control System), and a timing chain that replaced the timing belt. Moving to chain-driven cams allows the valves to be placed at a more narrow angle to each other and shrinks the cylinder bore from 99.5 mm to 94. It results in less unburned fuel during cold start, thereby reducing emissions. Subaru also uses asymmetrical connecting rods like those in EZ36. The FB is only marginally heavier and has similar exterior dimensions compared to an EJ engine of equivalent displacement. In Jan 2011, Car and Driver was told direct injection would be added soon. Direct Injection was added to FB engines used in the 2017 Impreza, 2018 Crosstrek, 2019 Forester and the 2020 Legacy and Outback models.

Subaru claims a 28-percent reduction in friction losses, mainly due to lighter pistons and connecting rods. The FB has a 10% improvement in fuel economy with the power coming on sooner and the torque band being broader.

- FB16E: 1600 cc DOHC, 2012+ EUDM Subaru Impreza XV 1.6i
- FB16F: 1600 cc DOHC, turbo, 2014–20 Subaru Levorg
- FB20B: 1995 cc DOHC, 2011+ JDM Subaru Forester, 2012-2016 Subaru Impreza, and 2012-2017 Subaru XV
- FB20D: 1995 cc DOHC, 2018+ Subaru Impreza, and 2018+ Subaru XV
- FB20X: 1995 cc DOHC, 2014–16 Subaru XV Hybrid
- FB20V: 1995 cc DOHC, 2019+ Subaru XV Hybrid
- FB25B: 2498 cc DOHC, 2011–18 North American Subaru Forester, 2013-2019 North American Subaru Legacy, and 2013-2019 North American Subaru Outback
- FB25D: 2498 cc DOHC, 2020+ North American Subaru Forester, 2020+ North American Subaru Legacy, 2020+ North American Subaru Outback, and 2021+ North American Subaru XV

=== Subaru CB engine ===
The CB engine was first introduced in 2020 with the second-generation Levorg. According to Subaru, CB stands for Concentration/Compact Boxer. The first engine in the series is designated CB18, a 1.8 litre dual overhead cam 16-valve engine featuring dual AVCS with gasoline direct injection and a turbocharger. Bore and stroke are 80.6 mm × 88.0 mm (3.17 in × 3.46 in), respectively, and the compression ratio is 10.4:1. Rated output power is 130 kW (180 PS; 170 hp) at 5,200–5,600 RPM and torque is 300 N⋅m (31 kg⋅m; 220 lb⋅ft) at 1,600–3,600 RPM.

Compared to the FB16 used in the previous generation of the Levorg, the CB18 offers decreased fuel consumption (16.6 km/L (39 mpg_{‑US}) for the CB18 and 16.0 km/L (38 mpg_{‑US}) for the FB16, both using the JC08 mode) and increased torque (300 N⋅m (31 kg⋅m; 220 lb⋅ft) for the CB18 and 250 N⋅m (25 kg⋅m; 180 lb⋅ft) for the FB16). In addition, the CB16 achieves its peak torque at a lower engine speed. The CB18 also is shorter and lighter than the FB16; the bore pitch (centerline to centerline spacing between adjacent cylinders) has decreased from 113.0 to 98.6 mm (4.45 to 3.88 in), the overall crank length has decreased from 350.5 to 315.9 mm (13.80 to 12.44 in), and engine weight has been reduced by 14.6 kg (32 lb). For the first time in a Subaru engine, the centerlines of the cylinder bores do not intersect with the crankshaft axis to reduce friction during the piston downstroke; instead, there is a crank offset of 8 mm (0.31 in). Overall thermal efficiency is 40% due to the adoption of lean-burn combustion with an excess air ratio (λ) of 2.

- CB18: 1795 cc DOHC, 2020 Subaru Levorg, 2021 Subaru Forester

== Six-cylinder ==
All of Subaru's six-cylinder engines are of a liquid-cooled, Flat-6 four-stroke design.

=== Subaru ER engine ===
(Japanese: Subaru ER27) Subaru introduced its first six-cylinder engine in its Subaru XT sports car. This MPI SOHC 2-Valve engine was based on the EA82, with two cylinders added to the front.

- ER27: 2672 cc SOHC, 145 hp at 5,200 rpm found in the 1987–1991 Subaru XT

=== Subaru EG engine ===
The (Japanese: Subaru EG33) engine was a direct replacement for the ER engine. The ER had been used only in the Subaru XT6, which was being replaced by the Subaru Alcyone SVX, and the company took the opportunity to create a new engine based on the more modern EJ rather than the EA engine series. As the ER27 was to the EA82, Subaru took the EJ22 design and created a six-cylinder version to make the new EG33. However, this four-valves-per-cylinder engine was DOHC, and valvetrain parts came from the not yet released EJ25D. Bore: 96.9 mm Stroke: 75 mm

- EG33: 3318 cc DOHC, 230 hp at 5,400 rpm used in the 1992–1997 Subaru Alcyone SVX

=== Subaru EZ engine ===
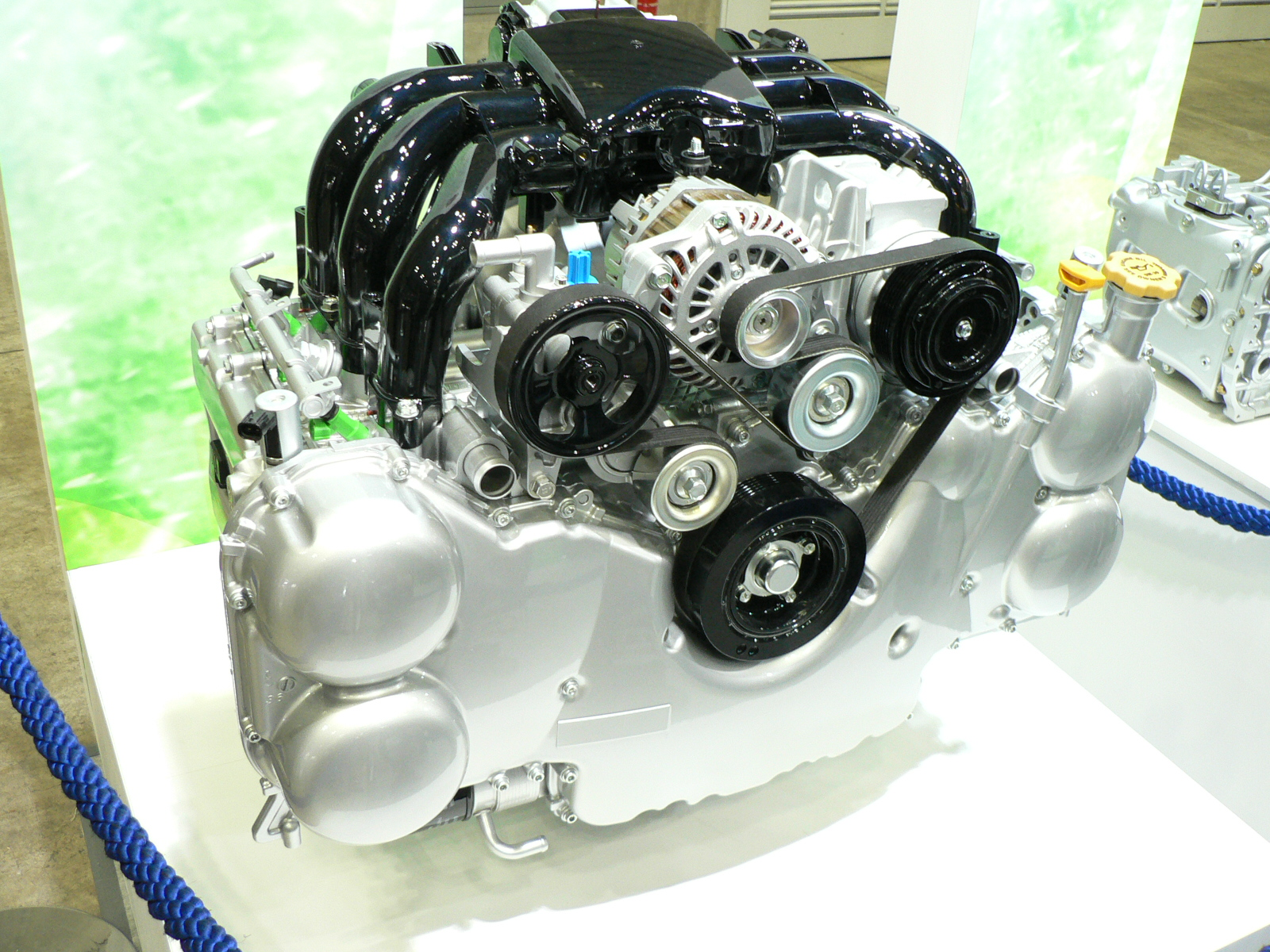
Subaru EZ36

The (Japanese: Subaru EZ series) was introduced in 1999 in the Japanese market, in the Subaru Outback, and in 2000 in the United States market, also in the Outback. It is a flat-six, 24-valve, quad-cam engine with an aluminium block and heads. It is available in EZ30 and EZ36 variants. Though the second iteration of the EZ30D used from 2003 to 2009 was heavily updated from the early EZ30D used from 2001 to 2003, Subaru continued to identify it as EZ30D. "EZ30R" is a false engine code often used on the Internet for the later EZ30, but Subaru has never used it as an official engine code. All EZ-series engines use dual timing chains and feature coil-on-plug ignition.

The 2000-2003 EZ30D used one exhaust port per head, a cable-actuated throttle, variable intake geometry, and a cast aluminium intake manifold. It was only available with an automatic transmission.

- Displacement: 2999 cc DOHC
- Bore: 89.2 mm
- Stroke: 80 mm
- Compression: 10.7:1
- Power: 220 PS (162 kW; 217 hp) at 6000 rpm
- Torque: 289 N⋅m (29 kg⋅m; 213 lb⋅ft) at 4400 rpm
- Application:
  - 2000–2004 Subaru Outback H6
  - 2002-2003 Subaru Legacy GT30
  - 2000–2003 Subaru Legacy Lancaster 6
  - 2002-2003 Subaru Legacy RS30

The 2003-2007 EZ30D received new cylinder heads with 3 exhaust ports per head, AVLS, AVCS on the intake cams only, a drive-by-wire throttle, and a plastic intake manifold. It was available in manual and automatic unlike the original EZ30D.

- Displacement: 2999 cc DOHC
- Bore: 89.2 mm
- Stroke: 80 mm
- Compression: 10.7:1
- Power: 180 kW (240 hp; 240 PS)@ 6,600 RPM
- Torque: 297 N⋅m (219 lb⋅ft)@ 4,200 RPM
- Application:
  - 2003–2009 Subaru Legacy 3.0R
  - 2005–2009 Subaru Outback 3.0R
  - 2006–2007 Tribeca

The EZ36D retains the plastic intake manifold, 3 exhaust ports per head, and drive-by-wire throttle of the later EZ30D, but loses AVLS while gaining AVCS for both intake and exhaust cams. The EZ36D also incorporates an asymmetrical connecting rod design shared with the FB series of engines and the EE20 diesel engine.

- Displacement: 3629 cc DOHC
- Bore: 92 mm
- Stroke: 91 mm
- Compression: 10.5:1
- Power: 260 PS (191 kW; 256 hp) at 6000 rpm
- Torque: 350 N⋅m (36 kg⋅m; 258 lb⋅ft) at 4400 rpm
- Application:
  - 2010-2019 Subaru Legacy
  - 2010-2019 Subaru Outback
  - 2008-2014 Subaru Tribeca

== See also ==
- Subaru Active Valve Control System
- Subaru Active Valve Lift System
- Subaru 1235
- List of Subaru transmissions
