= Subaru CB engine =

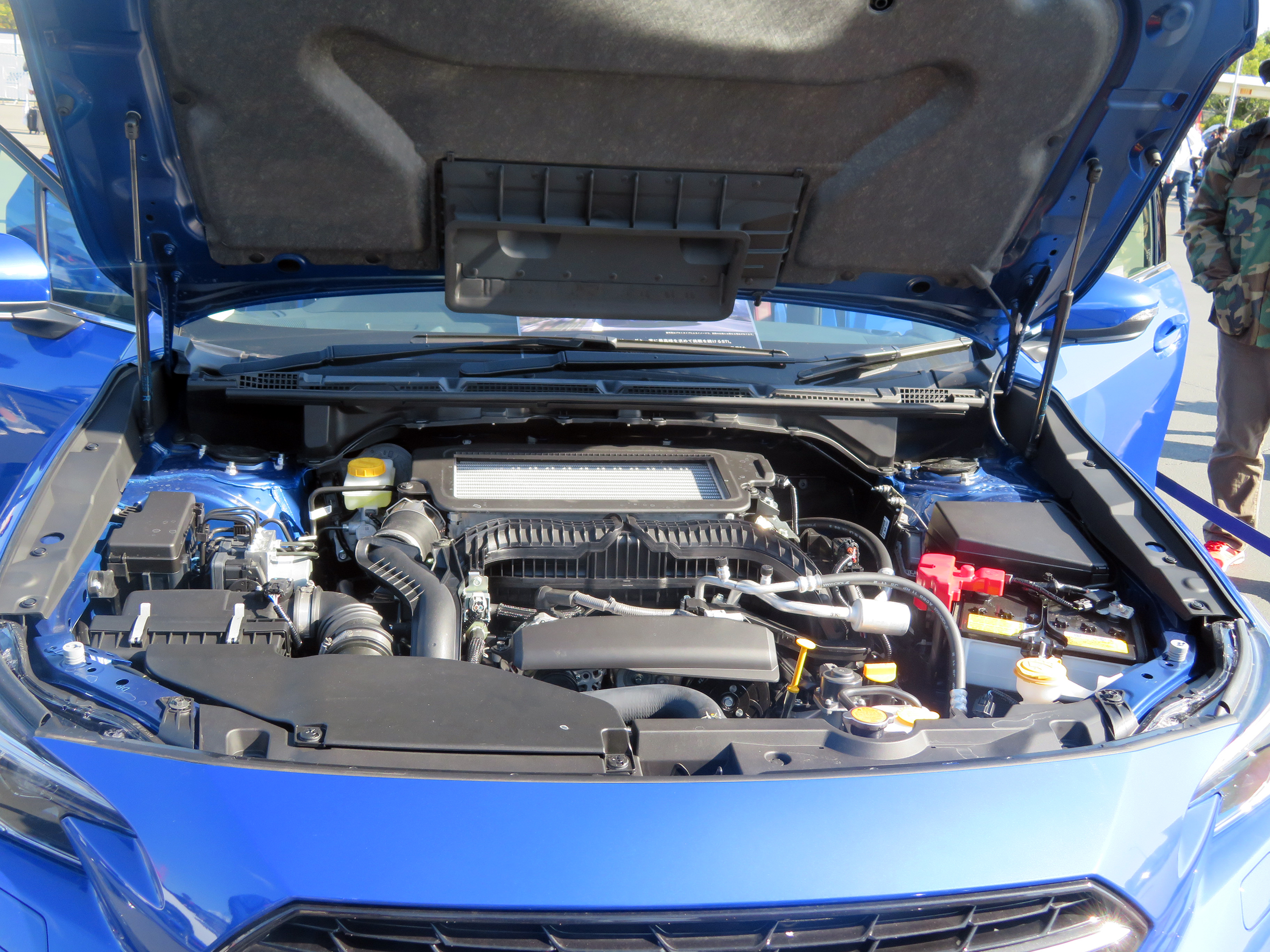
- CB18 in a Levorg (Oct 2020)

Overview
- Manufacturer: Subaru
- Production: 2020–present

Layout
- Configuration: Flat-4
- Displacement: 1.8 L (1,795 cm^{3})
- Cylinder bore: 80.6 mm (3.17 in)
- Piston stroke: 88 mm (3.46 in)
- Valvetrain: DOHC 4 valves x cyl. with AVCS
- Compression ratio: 10.4:1

Combustion
- Turbocharger: Yes
- Fuel system: Fuel injection
- Fuel type: Petrol/gasoline
- Cooling system: Water-cooled

Output
- Power output: 177 PS (130 kW; 175 hp)
- Torque output: 300 N⋅m (221 lb⋅ft; 31 kg⋅m)

Chronology
- Predecessor: FB, FA (split diagonally)

The Subaru CB engine is a gasoline boxer-4 engine used in Subaru automobiles. It is the fourth generation of Subaru boxer engines, following the first (EA, 1966–94), second (EJ, 1989–2021), and third (FB/FA, 2010/2012–present) generations.

== Overview ==
The CB engine was first introduced in August 2020 with the second-generation Levorg. According to Subaru, CB stands for Concentration/Compact Boxer. It is the fourth-generation boxer engine family from Subaru. Compared to the preceding FB series, the CB is shorter; the bore pitch (centerline to centerline spacing between adjacent cylinders) has decreased from 113.0 to 98.6 mm (4.45 to 3.88 in) and the overall crank length has decreased from 350.5 to 315.9 mm (13.80 to 12.44 in).

For the first time in a Subaru engine, the centerlines of the cylinder bores do not intersect with the crankshaft axis; instead, there is a crank offset of 8 mm (0.31 in). This offset reduces friction during the piston downstroke. Overall thermal efficiency is 40% due to the adoption of lean-burn combustion with an excess air ratio (λ) of 2. The injector is positioned next to the spark plug in the center of the combustion chamber to ensure the lean mixture will ignite reliably. A small single-scroll turbocharger was equipped to maintain charge air volume and improve throttle response.

The connecting rods in the CB engine are split horizontally, like those in the second generation EJ engines. The third generation FB/FA connecting rods are split diagonally (also called an offset or asymmetrical connecting rod) to allow a longer piston stroke without increasing the width of the engine, but the horizontally-split connecting rods are stronger.

== CB18 ==
The first engine in the series is designated CB18, a 1.8 litre dual overhead cam 16-valve engine featuring dual AVCS with gasoline direct injection and a turbocharger. Compared to the FB16 used in the previous generation of the Levorg, the CB18 offers decreased fuel consumption (16.6 km/L (39 mpg_{‑US}) for the CB18 and 16.0 km/L (38 mpg_{‑US}) for the FB16, both using the JC08 mode) and increased torque (300 N⋅m (31 kg⋅m; 220 lb⋅ft) for the CB18 and 250 N⋅m (25 kg⋅m; 180 lb⋅ft) for the FB16). In addition, the CB18 achieves its peak torque at a lower engine speed. Engine weight of the CB18 has been reduced by 14.6 kg (32 lb) compared with the FB16.

In October 2020, Subaru announced the CB18 also would be fitted to the top-of-the-line 'Sport' trim of the 5th generation Subaru Forester in the Japanese market; other models of the Forester are equipped with the mild hybrid FB20D e-BOXER.

The CB18 engine is also fitted to the Subaru Legacy Outback for the Japanese market.

In April 2022, Subaru had to suspend production of Forester, Outback and Levorg after it discovered a sensor in CB18 engine malfunctioned.

CB18 specifications

- Displacement: 1,795 cc (1.8 L) DOHC, turbocharged
- Bore × stroke: 80.6 mm × 88 mm (3.17 in × 3.46 in)
- Compression ratio: 10.4:1
- Power: 177 PS (130 kW; 175 hp) at 5,200–5,600 RPM
- Torque: 300 N⋅m (31 kg⋅m; 221 lb⋅ft) at 1,600–3,600 RPM

CB18 applications

- 2021–present JDM Subaru Levorg (VN5)
- 2021–present JDM Subaru Forester (SK5)
- 2021–present JDM Subaru Legacy Outback (BT5)
- 2025– JDM Subaru Forester (SL5)
