= Subaru EJ engine =

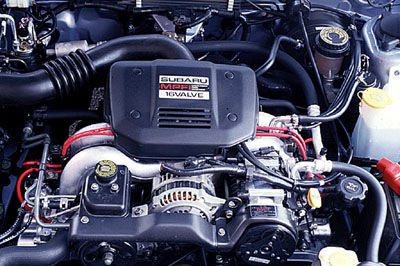

Overview
- Manufacturer: Subaru
- Production: 1988–2021 (EJ20)

Layout
- Configuration: Flat-four
- Displacement: 1.5 L (1,493 cc; 91.1 cu in); 1.6 L (1,597 cc; 97.5 cu in); 1.8 L (1,820 cc; 111.1 cu in); 2.0 L (1,994 cc; 121.7 cu in); 2.2 L (2,212 cc; 135.0 cu in); 2.5 L (2,457 cc; 149.9 cu in)
- Cylinder bore: 85 mm (3.35 in); 87.9 mm (3.46 in); 92 mm (3.62 in); 96.9 mm (3.81 in); 99.5 mm (3.92 in)
- Piston stroke: 65.8 mm (2.59 in); 75 mm (2.95 in); 79 mm (3.11 in)
- Valvetrain: DOHC/SOHC 4 valves x cyl. with AVCS or AVLS (some versions)
- Compression ratio: 8.0:1, 8.5:1, 9.0:1, 9.4:1, 9.5:1, 9.7:1, 10.0:1

Combustion
- Turbocharger: Optional
- Fuel system: Carburetor, Fuel injection
- Fuel type: Gasoline
- Cooling system: Water cooled

Output
- Power output: 94 to 341 hp (70 to 254 kW; 95 to 346 PS)
- Torque output: 129 to 407 N⋅m (95 to 300 lb⋅ft)

Chronology
- Predecessor: Subaru EA engine
- Successor: Subaru FB engine

The Subaru EJ engine is a series of four-stroke automotive engines manufactured by Subaru. Introduced in 1989, they were intended to succeed the previous Subaru EA engine. The EJ series was the mainstay of Subaru's engine line, with all engines of this series being 16-valve horizontal flat-fours, with configurations available for single, or double-overhead camshaft arrangements (SOHC or DOHC). Naturally aspirated and turbocharged versions are available, ranging from 94 to 341 hp (70 to 254 kW; 95 to 346 PS). These engines are commonly used in light aircraft, kit cars and engine swaps into air-cooled Volkswagens, and are also popular as a swap into Volkswagen T3/Vanagons powered by the Volkswagen Wasserboxer engine. Primary engineering on the EJ series was done by Masayuki Kodama, Takemasa Yamada and Shuji Sawafuji of Fuji Heavy Industries, Subaru's parent company.

== EJ15 (1.5L Boxer NA) ==
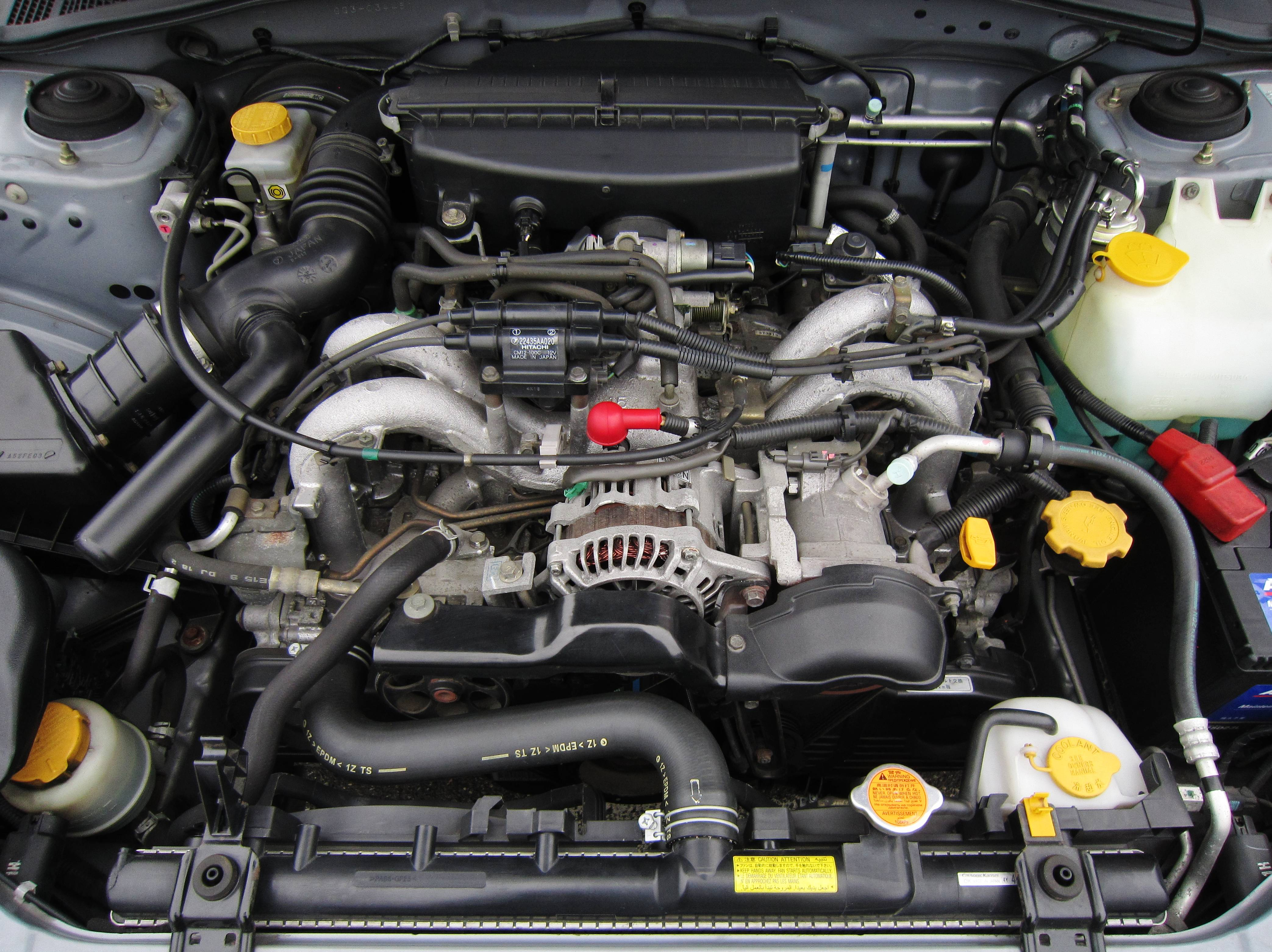
Subaru EJ15 engine (2004 Impreza)

Usage:

- Impreza GC1 series (JDM) — Replaced by Subaru EL engine in 2006 GD, GG, GE & GH series (JDM) Impreza.
- Impreza 93–06 (Latin America)

=== Specifications ===
- Displacement: 1,493 cc (1.5 L; 91.1 cu in)
- Bore: 85 mm (3.35 in)
- Stroke: 65.8 mm (2.59 in)
- Compression Ratio: 9.4:1 – 10.0
- Valvetrain: SOHC, 16 valves
- Fuel Delivery multi point fuel injection

EJ151

- Horsepower: 97 PS (71 kW; 96 bhp) at 6000 rpm
- Torque: 129 N⋅m (95 lb⋅ft) at 3600 rpm

EJ152

- Horsepower: 102 PS (75 kW; 101 bhp) at 5600 rpm
- Torque: 137 N⋅m (101 lb⋅ft) at 4000 rpm

EJ153

- Horsepower: 95 PS (70 kW; 94 bhp) at 5200 rpm
- Torque: 140 N⋅m (103 lb⋅ft) at 3600 rpm

EJ154

- Horsepower: 100 PS (74 kW; 99 bhp) at 5200 rpm
- Torque: 142 N⋅m (105 lb⋅ft) at 4000 rpm

== EJ16 (1.6L Boxer NA) ==
Usage:

- Impreza 93–94 (JDM only) GC4 series
- Impreza 93–06 (Europe & Middle East)
- Impreza 93–97 (Australia)
- Impreza 93–06 (Latin America)

=== Specifications ===
- Displacement: 1,597 cc (1.6 L; 97.5 cu in)
- Bore: 87.9 mm (3.46 in)
- Stroke: 65.8 mm (2.59 in)
- Compression Ratio: 9.4:1 – 10.0:1
- Valvetrain: SOHC Belt drive
- Fuel Delivery mpfi (carburetor in some locations)

EJ16

- Horsepower: 90–98 PS (66–72 kW; 89–97 bhp) at 6000 rpm
- Torque: 138 N⋅m (102 lb⋅ft) at 4500 rpm

== EJ18 (1.8L Boxer NA) ==
Usage:

- Impreza 93–99 GC6 series
- Legacy (except USA) 90–96 BC2, BC3, BD2, BD3, BG3 series
- Isuzu Aska (1990–1993)

=== Specifications ===
- Displacement: 1,825 cc (1.8 L; 111.4 cu in)
- Bore: 87.9 mm (3.46 in)
- Stroke: 75 mm (2.95 in)
- Compression Ratio: 9.5:1 – 9.7:1
- Valvetrain: SOHC
- Fuel Delivery Carburetor + Distributor (mainly for Latin American and Asian markets) and single point fuel injection

EJ181

- Horsepower: 110 PS (81 kW; 108 bhp) at 6000 rpm
- Torque: 149 N⋅m (110 lb⋅ft) at 3200 rpm

EJ182

- Horsepower: 115 PS (85 kW; 113 bhp) at 6000 rpm
- Torque: 154 N⋅m (114 lb⋅ft) at 4500 rpm

EJ183

- Horsepower: 120 PS (88 kW; 118 bhp) at 5600 rpm
- Torque: 164 N⋅m (121 lb⋅ft) at 3600 rpm

== EJ20 (2.0L Boxer Turbo/NA) ==
- Bore: 92 mm (3.62 in)
- Stroke: 75 mm (2.95 in)

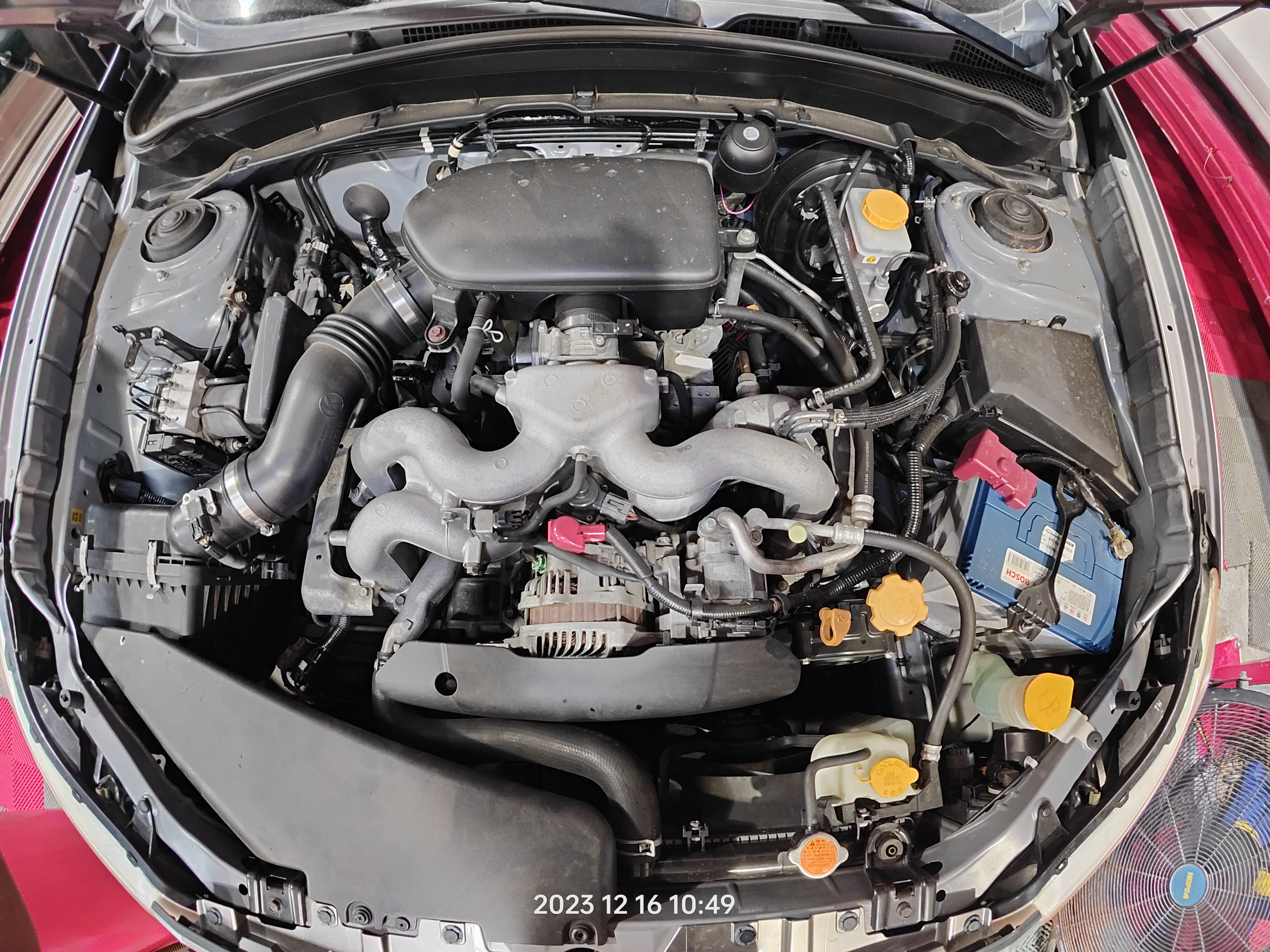
Subaru EJ20 Engine N/A

At the 46th Tokyo Motor Show in October 2019, Subaru announced it would conclude production of the EJ20 by the end of March 2020. At that time, the EJ20 was only being sold in the Japanese domestic market for the WRX STI, and a special "WRX STI EJ20 Final Edition" with a balanced version of the engine was sold to commemorate the end of EJ20 production.

=== Naturally aspirated ===
EJ20E SOHC naturally aspirated

- Legacy JDM
  - 1989–1994 125 PS (92 kW; 123 hp) BC — BF series
  - 1993–1999 135 PS (99 kW; 133 hp) BD — BG series( ECU code EURO, D3; Asia 4H)
  - 1998–2004 155 PS (114 kW; 153 hp) BE — BH series( ECU code EURO, D3; Asia 4H)
  - 2003–2009 140 PS (103 kW; 138 hp) BL — BP series

- Europe

- 1991–1999 115 PS (85 kW; 113 hp) BC, BD, BF series

- Impreza JDM
  - 1993–1999 135 PS (99 kW; 133 hp) GC — GF series
  - 2008–current 140 PS (103 kW; 138 hp) GH — GE series

- Europe

- 1994–1999 115 PS (85 kW; 113 hp) GC, GF series

- Isuzu Aska (1990–1993)
  - 1990–1993 125 PS (92 kW; 123 hp)

EJ201 SOHC naturally aspirated

- Bore: 92 mm (3.62 in)
- Stroke: 75 mm (2.95 in)
- MAP sensor
- Forester (Europe) SF and SG Series (pre-facelift)
  - 2002–2005 125 PS (92 kW; 123 hp)
- GD/GG Impreza
  - 2000–2005 125 PS (92 kW; 123 hp)
- GC/GF Impreza
- BE/BH Legacy

EJ20D DOHC naturally aspirated

- Legacy JDM
  - 1989–1999 150 PS (110 kW; 148 hp) BC — BF and BD — BG series

EJ202 SOHC naturally aspirated

- Forester JDM SF series, 138 PS (1997 – 2002)
- Forester JDM SG series, 137 PS (2004, perhaps 2003–2005), e.g. EJ202DXSAE x20

EJ203 SOHC naturally aspirated

- Forester JDM SG series, 140 PS (2003 – 2008)
- Legacy JDM 2.0i BP/BL series, 140 PS (2003 – 2009)

EJ204 DOHC naturally aspirated AVCS

- Legacy B4 TSR JDM BE — BH series
  - 1999–2001 155 PS (114 kW; 153 hp)
- Legacy JDM BL — BP series
  - 2003–2009 190 PS (140 kW; 187 hp)
- Legacy (Europe) BL — BP series
  - 2003–2007 165 PS (121 kW; 163 hp)
- Impreza JDM GC — GF series
  - 1993–1999 155 PS (114 kW; 153 hp)
- Impreza GE — GH series
  - 2007–2011 150 PS (110 kW; 148 hp)
- Forester (Europe) SG Series
  - 2005–2007 158 PS (116 kW; 156 hp)
- Forester JDM SH Series
  - 2008–2011 150 PS (110 kW; 148 hp)
- Exiga JDM YA Series
  - 2008–2012 150 PS (110 kW; 148 hp)

- Legacy European and S. African Markets BM BR Series
  - 2009–2014 150 PS (110 kW; 148 hp)

EJ20C runs on compressed natural gas

All engines listed below were installed with a turbocharger and an intercooler:

=== EJ20T ===
Is not actually a valid code from Subaru, but is mostly used by enthusiasts and mechanics to describe the entire line of turbocharged engines that have been available over time. The practice began with the designation of the USA-spec turbo, commonly referred to as the EJ22T, and the habit of referring to any turbocharged engine as a "T" began. When referring to the EJ20T, one is speaking of one of the following:

==== EJ20G ====
EJ20G engines fall into 3 categories:

===== 1. Rocker-style HLA EJ20G usage =====
- Legacy RS 89–93
- Legacy RS-RA 89–93
- Legacy GT 89–93

Power output ranges from 147 kW (197 bhp; 200 PS) at 6000 rpm and for the GT to 162 kW (217 bhp; 220 PS) at 6400 rpm and for the RS versions. Engines can be identified by coil on plug, and with 2 M6 bolts per coil and valve covers with 4CAM 16VALVE and horizontal lines above and below the plug holes. All these engines have the air-to-water intercooler setup (chargecooler) and close deck blocks equipped with piston oil squirters.

===== 2. Bucket-style HLA EJ20G usage =====
- Impreza WRX 92~96.
- Impreza WRX Wagon 92~96
  - Impreza WRX Wagon AT 96~98
- Subaru Impreza WRX RA 93~96
- EUDM Subaru Impreza Turbo 94~96
- Subaru Impreza WRX STI 95~96

This updated type of EJ20G was used in all WRX models since early 1992, cylinder head is equipped with hydraulic lifters compared to the rocker arms used in the previous EJ20G. Pistons in this type of EJ20G are all cast aluminum. Closed-deck engine block equipped with piston oil squirters was used until mid 1994. Followed by Open-deck block equipped with piston oil squirters was used very short period of time, Followed by Open-deck block from 1995 until mid 1996 when the first EJ20K WRX engines came out. The open deck block on all EJ20G could be identified by a smoother surface, and a tab on the right surface of the block halves. The EJ20G continued to be used in the WRX Wagon with an Automatic Transmission from 1996 till 1998 when it was replaced by the EJ205.

- Closed deck:
- EJ20GDW1HD 1992-05-01 to 1993-08-31 WRX.EJ20G
- EJ20GDW1HE 1992-05-01 to 1993-08-31 WRX.EJ20G
- EJ20GDW1HJ 1992-05-01 to 1993-08-31 WRXRA.EJ20G
- EJ20GDW1HR 1992-05-01 to 1993-08-31 WRXRA.EJ20G
- EJ20GDW2HD 1993-05-01 to 1994-09-30 S.WRX.MT.EJ20G
- EJ20GDW2HE 1993-05-01 to 1994-09-30 S.WRX.MT.EJ20G
- EJ20GDW2HJ 1993-05-01 to 1994-09-30 WRXRA.EJ20G
- EJ20GDW2HR 1993-05-01 to 1994-09-30 WRXRA.EJ20G
- EJ20GDW4HJ 1993-06-01 to 1995-08-31 WRXRA.EJ20G
- EJ20GDW5HJ 1995-09-01 to 1996-08-31 WRXRA.EJ20G (STI VERSION)
- Open deck:
- EJ20GDX1ND 1993-05-01 to 1994-09-30 AT.EJ20G
- EJ20GDX1NE 1993-05-01 to 1994-09-30 AT.EJ20G
- EJ20GDW1ND 1993-05-01 to 1994-09-30 W.MT.EJ20G
- EJ20GDW1NE 1993-05-01 to 1994-09-30 W.MT.EJ20G
- EJ20GDW4HD 1994-06-01 to 1995-08-31 S.WRX.EJ20G
- EJ20GDW4HE 1994-06-01 to 1995-08-31 S.WRX.EJ20G
- EJ20GDW4ND 1994-06-01 to 1995-08-31 W.WRX.MT.EJ20G
- EJ20GDW4NE 1994-06-01 to 1995-08-31 W.WRX.MT.EJ20G
- EJ20GDX4NE 1994-06-01 to 1995-08-31 WRX.AT.EJ20G
- EJ20GDW5HE 1995-09-01 to 1996-08-31 S.WRX.EJ20G
- EJ20GDW5NE 1995-09-01 to 1996-08-31 W.WRX.MT.EJ20G
- EJ20GDX5NE 1995-09-01 to 1996-08-31 AT.EJ20G
- EJ20GDX5HD 1995-09-01 to 1996-08-31 S.WRX.EJ20G
- EJ20GDW5PE 1995-10-01 to 1996-08-31 W.WRX.MT.EJ20G (STI VERSION)
- EJ20GDW5PE 1995-10-01 to 1996-08-31 WRXSTI.EJ20G
- EJ20GDW5PJ 1995-10-01 to 1996-08-31 WRXRASTI.EJ20G

===== 3. Shim-under-bucket style EJ20G usage =====
All EJ20G equipped Impreza WRX STI RA.(WRX RA needs confirming)

Power output ranges from 220 PS (162 kW; 217 hp) at 6000 rpm for the WRX Wagons to 275 PS (202 kW; 271 hp) at 6500 rpm for the WRX STI Version II. Engines can be identified by coil on plug with 1 M8 bolt per coil and valve covers with 4CAM 16VALVE and horizontal lines above the plug holes. Generally these engines all have the slanted intercooler. Engines from the STI RAs received the upgraded Shim-Under-bucket style lifters unlike the normal HLA buckets the WRX & the WRX STI had. These engines also feature STI factory 8.5:1 forged pistons, lighter valves, the intake valves are marked INKO and the exhaust valves are marked EXKO. The standard HLA valves are I252 and E283 respectively. All WRX Wagon engines and automatic sedan engines came with a TD04 with 90 deg elbow, all manual WRX sedans including STI versions had a TD05 with 90 deg elbow.

EJ20J SOHC naturally aspirated

- JDM Forester SF5 S/20 135 ps (1997–1998)

==== EJ20K ====
EJ20K engines fall into 2 categories:

===== 1. Shim-over-bucket style EJ20K usage (late EJ20G) =====
- JDM WRX 96~97
- Impreza WRX wagon MT 97~98
- Impreza WRX type RA or R MT 97~98
- SF5 Forester

===== 2. Shim-under-bucket style EJ20K usage =====
- Impreza WRX STI MT 96~98
- Impreza WRX STI wagon MT 96~98
- Impreza WRX STI type RA or R MT 96~98

Power output is 270 PS (199 kW; 266 bhp) at 6800 RPM for the Japanese versions and 300 PS (221 kW; 296 bhp) for the v3 STI with VF23 turbo. These engines can be identified by smooth valve covers, plug leads and a wasted spark coil in the middle of the intake manifold. In addition, the inlet manifold may be bare aluminum for all WRX models and red for all STI models. The engine utilizes an IHI ball-bearing turbo unit. VF22 on the WRX, either a VF23 or VF24 on the STI. These engines have die-cast pistons for all WRX models, STI and STI typeRA/STI type R models shares exactly the same factory forged pistons.

==== EJ205 ====
This engine series is used for WRX models in the world market outside Japan as of 1999. The Japanese WRX models use the EJ207 from 1999~2001, except the 5-door wagon which also uses the EJ205. After 2001, all WRXs used the EJ205, until 2006 when the USDM WRX model changed engines to the EJ255. The EJ205 has an 8:1–9:1 compression ratio.

To identify an EJ205:

- Coil on plug, except in JDM SF5 forester.
- idle air integrated into throttle body
- inlet under manifold
- open deck block

Usage: Impreza WRX

- 99~01 (JDM Wagon Body only)
- 01~06 (all JDM)
- 02~05 (USDM)
- 05 SAAB 9-2X AERO
- 99~06 (all other markets)

Forester Cross Sports, S/tb, STI

- Late 99–01 (9:1 Compression ratio)
- 2003, 219 PS (161 kW; 216 hp) at 5500 rpm

NOTE: The Australian Spec MY00 EJ205 does not have coil on plug but can be identified from the VIN of the vehicle (if known) where the tenth digit will be Y (for year 2000) and the sixth digit will be 8 (for the 2000yr/EJ205)

==== EJ207 ====
It started its life for the 9/98–8/99 GC8 in Japan, UK, Australia. The EJ207 has an 8.0:1 compression ratio.

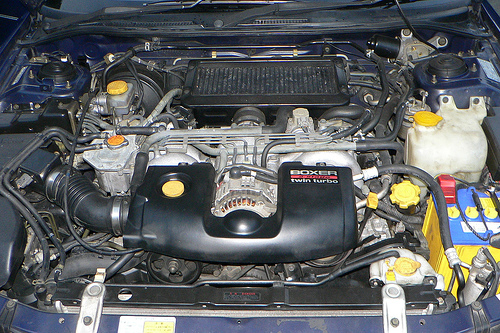
Quad Cam Twin-turbo from JDM 1996 Subaru Legacy GT

To identify a 9/98–9/2000 EJ207 (v5/v6 WRX STI GC8/GF8)

- wasted spark coil pack off center of manifold
- idle air integrated into throttle body
- inlet under manifold
- red or bare aluminum intake manifold
- Open deck block (2001+ are all Semi-closed)
- higher rev limit than ej205
- Version 7 has AVCS

V7 are single scroll, AVCS, throttle by cable, top-feed injectors, engines. The TGV are deleted from the factory. The factory deletion is incomplete, even on the Spec C and even on the Type RA. The exhaust is compatible all the way to the downpipe to the USDM WRX/Sti. Oxygen sensor is same as USDM EJ205. The oil pan is like the USDM WRX 2.0 The Turbo is the VF30. The ECU has the same number and shape harness plugs as the USDM WRX 2.0. No immobilizer. The engine speed is limited from the factory at 8000 rpm

V8, 9 are twinscroll, AVCS, throttle by cable, topfeed injectors, engines. There are no TGV's, the intake manifold is one piece. The spark plugs are specified one step colder, compared with other Sti. The exhaust is completely different/incompatible with the USDM WRX/Sti, all the way from the header to the downpipe. It can be replaced by a USDM exhaust, the USDM does bolt up to the block. The oil pan is like the USDM Sti. The turbo is a VF37. The ECU has the same number and shape harness plugs as the USDM WRX 2.0 There is no immobilizer for V8 and for some V9. Although to some V10. Even more from imported models. There were no transponder chip's inside the transmitter housing case. The V9 known so far to not have immobilizer have been early V9 Spec C (revision E engines). The engine speed is limited from the factory at 8000 rpm When compared with the USDM A/C compressor, the JDM Sti is of a different part number and smaller in size. It is possible that the losses while using it are smaller. Many have an additional intake air temperature sensor by the throttle body. Its function has been discussed but not completely clarified. The power steering pump is different. The JDM cars included some Spec C with 13:1 steering rack. The pump remained the same, so it is designed to handle a fast rack. The com protocol is not canbus for any of these. Some of the Sti engines don't come with provision for cruise control. It is next to impossible to tell which had it. The ROM settings are quite different from a V7. The turbo inlet has one less connection in it and most likely is of a larger diameter than the USDM, from the factory. The front Oxygen sensor has been relocated after the turbo, in the downpipe. Different part number 22641AA042. Usage:

- Impreza WRX STi 1998~2021 (JDM, specifically homologation models for World Rally Championship)

==== EJ20X/EJ20Y ====
Based on the same engine platform; the X designation indicates an automatic package, and the Y designation indicates a manual package. The EJ20X engine was introduced in the 2003 Legacy GT, mated to a five-speed automatic transmission, and the EJ20Y engine was introduced in the 2004 Legacy GT, with a five-speed manual transmission.

The EJ20X and EJ20Y are open deck engines whereby the cylinder walls were supported at the three and nine o’clock positions. It came with an aluminium alloy block with 92 mm (3.62 in) bores – with cast iron cylinder liners – and a 75 mm (2.95 in) stroke for a capacity of 498.6 cc (30.43 cu in) per cylinder, with thicker cylinder walls than EJ25. The crankcase for the EJ20X and EJ20Y engines had five main bearings and the flywheel housing was cast with the crankcase for increased rigidity. The EJ20X and EJ20Y engines had an aluminium alloy cylinder head with cross-flow cooling, double overhead camshafts (DOHC) per cylinder bank and four valves per cylinder that were actuated by roller rocker arms.

The EJ20X and EJ20Y engines were equipped with Subaru's ‘Dual Active Valve Control System’ (‘Dual AVCS’) which provided variable intake and exhaust valve timing. The Legacy GT, the EJ20X engine was fitted with a twin-scroll IHI VF38 turbocharger; the EJ20Y engine, however, had a larger twin-scroll Mitsubishi TD04 HLA 19T turbocharger. For the revised BL.II Legacy GT, both the EJ20X and EJ20Y had an IHI VF44 turbocharger for the initial 2006 model year, replaced the following year with the IHI VF45.

Both came with a 9.5:1 compression and a fast spooling turbo yields a torque filled performance. 241–280 bhp (180–209 kW; 244–284 PS)

Turbos:

- IHI VF38 (automatic, 03–06)
- Mitsubishi TD04 HLA 19T (manual, 03–06)
- IHI VF44 (manual and automatic, 06MY only)
- IHI VF45 (manual and automatic, 06–09MY)

Usage: EJ20X/EJ20Y

- 03~09 BL and BP Legacy GT
- 03-06 BL and BP Liberty GT (Australia)
- 07–11 Subaru Impreza GT

Engine Swapping Applications: When swapping over the EJ20X/Y Powertrain over to these models, you have the option to use the twin-scroll turbocharger and JDM headers, up-pipe but you'll need to source/alternate a twin-scroll downpipe to fit along your current exhaust set-up or swap over the USDM Intake Manifold along with the USDM headers, up-pipe, turbocharger and use your existing exhaust set-up.

The EJ20X does not come with timing guides when installing on a manual USDM swap while the EJ20Y does.

Compatible Swap Options for USDM (But Only Have Intake AVCS Working) 32 Bit ECU W/ Intake AVCS Only:

- 08–14 WRX Models
- 04–07 STi Models
- 04+ Legacy GT Models
- 04+ Forester XT Models

Compatible Swap Options for USDM (With Dual AVCS Working) 32 Bit ECU W/ Intake & Exhaust:

- 08–21 STi Models

=== EJ20TT ===
This may refer to a DOHC Sequential Twin Turbo and intercooled engine (EJ20H/EJ20R/EJ206/EJ208). However, similar to the EJ20T, the term was never used by Subaru. Used from 1994 to 2005 in various iterations listed below. Due to the tight confines of the engine bay, the twin turbo engine was installed in Japanese-spec Legacies and Australian market Liberty B4 models, which were right-hand drive. The Pistons were lighter with a shorter skirt than the WRX EJ20T to allow for higher engine speed.

=== Specifications ===
- Displacement: 1,998 cc (2.0 L; 121.9 cu in)
- Bore: 92 mm (3.62 in)
- Stroke: 75 mm (2.95 in)
- Compression ratio: 8.5:1 – 9.0:1
- Valvetrain: DOHC
- Fuel delivery multi-point sequential fuel injection

==== EJ20H ====
Usage:

- 1993–1996 pre-facelift Legacy chassis code BD5/BG5 (Revision A) JDM RS, GT, and GT/B-spec manual and automatic. 184 kW (250 PS; 247 bhp) 8.5:1 compression ratio.
- 1996–1998 facelift Legacy chassis code BD5/BG5 (Revision B & C) JDM RS, GT, GT-B automatic and GT manual. 191 kW (260 PS; 256 bhp) 9.0:1 compression ratio.

==== EJ20R ====
Usage:

- 1996–1997 facelift Legacy chassis code BD5/BG5 (Revision B) JDM RS and GT-B manual only. 206 kW (280 PS; 276 bhp) 8.0:1 compression ratio.
- 1997–1998 facelift Legacy chassis code BD5/BG5 (Revision C) JDM RS and GT-B manual only. 206 kW (280 PS; 276 bhp) 8.5:1 compression ratio.

==== EJ206 ====
Usage:

- 1998–2003 Legacy chassis code BE5/BH5 JDM GT's, GT-B's and B4's (190 kW (258 PS; 255 bhp)) Transmission: Auto/5 Speed Manual

BH5A — 9.0:1 Compression — "Phase-II", or V5/6 generation.
BH5B — 9.0:1 Compression — "Phase-II", or V5/6 generation.
BH5C — 9.0:1 Compression — "Phase-II", or V5/6 generation.
BH5D — 9.0:1 Compression — "Phase-III", or V7 generation.

==== EJ208 ====
Usage:

- 1998–2003 Legacy chassis code BE5/BH5 JDM GT's, GT-B's and B4's (206 kW (280 PS; 276 bhp)) Transmission: Manual

BH5A — 8.5:1 Compression — "Phase-II", or V5/6 generation.
BH5B — 8.5:1 Compression — "Phase-II", or V5/6 generation.
BH5C — 9.0:1 Compression — "Phase-II", or V5/6 generation.
BH5D — 9.0:1 Compression — "Phase-III", or V7 generation.

Rev D EJ208's can be considered a totally different motor to the A/B/C's, they run totally different cams, cam pulleys with different timing marks, different crank sprocket with different timing marks, pink injectors instead of yellow 440's, different intake manifold design. etc.

- A/B have primary VF25 for automatic transmission or VF26 for manual and secondary VF27 turbo's.
- C have primary VF31 and secondary VF32 turbo's.
- D have primary VF33 (46.5 / 9-blade turbine wheel and a / 6 + 6 blade compressor) and secondary VF32 (exhaust side it uses a 46.5 / 9-blade turbine wheel, teamed with a 52.5 / 10-blade compressor wheel). All secondary turbos are ball bearing and primary turbos are journal bearing.

== EJ22 (2.2L Boxer Turbo/NA) ==
Usage:

- Impreza 95–01
- Legacy 90–99, Outback 95–96

=== Naturally Aspirated ===
==== Specifications ====
- Displacement: 2,212 cc (2.2 L; 135.0 cu in)
- Bore: 96.9 mm (3.81 in)
- Stroke: 75 mm (2.95 in)
- Compression Ratio: 9.5:1 – 9.7:1
- Valvetrain: SOHC
- Fuel Delivery multi-point fuel injection

===== EJ22E =====
(1989–1994)

- Horsepower: 130 bhp (97 kW; 132 PS) at 5800 rpm
- Torque: 186 N⋅m (137 lb⋅ft) at 4800 rpm

(1995–1996)

- Horsepower: 135 bhp (101 kW; 137 PS) at 5800 rpm
- Torque: 190 N⋅m (140 lb⋅ft) at 4800 rpm

(1997–1998)

- Horsepower: 137 bhp (102 kW; 139 PS) at 5400 rpm
- Torque: 197 N⋅m (145 lb⋅ft) at 4000 rpm

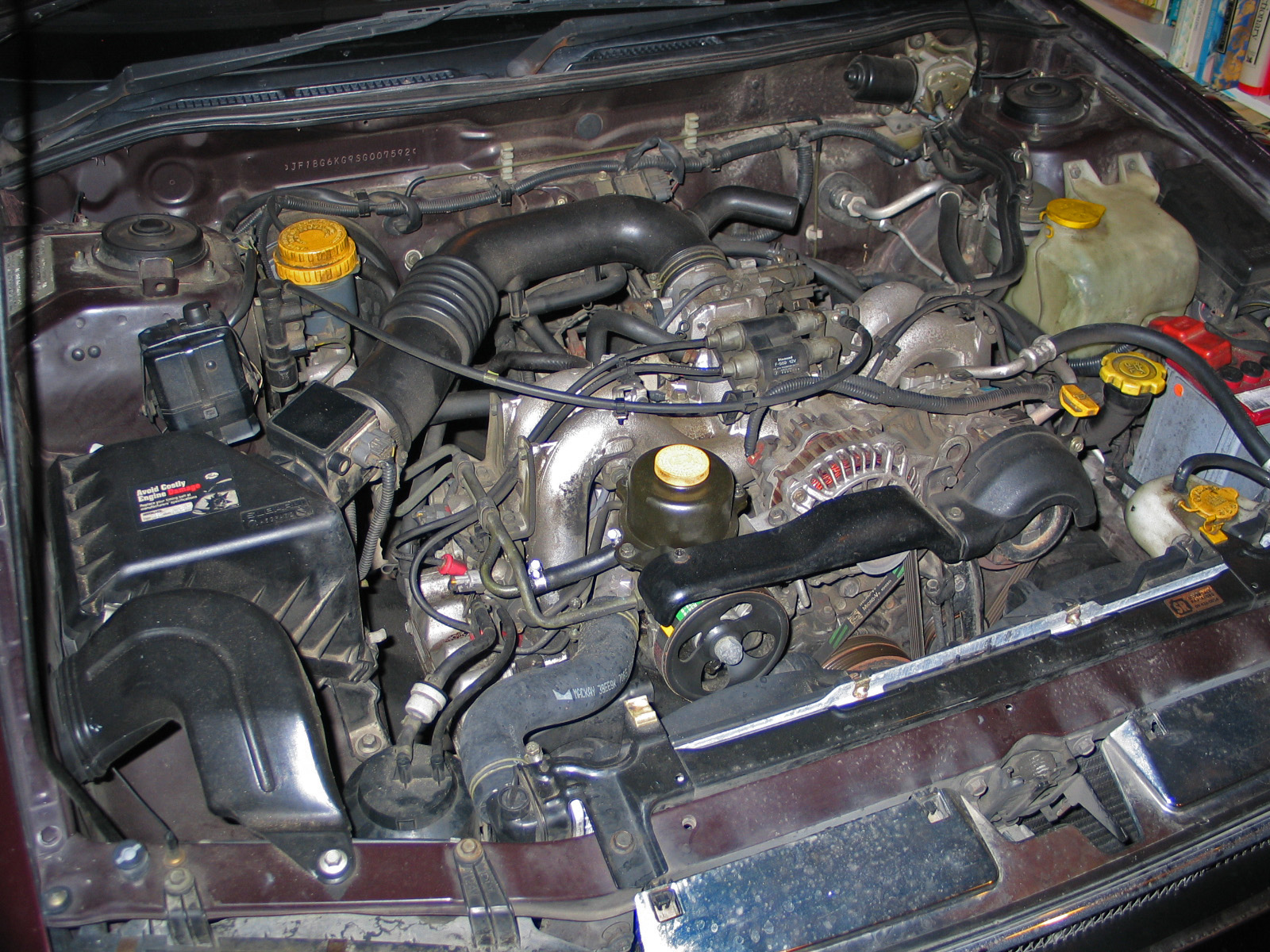
AUDM Subaru EJ22E

Australian model —

- 100 kW (134 hp; 136 PS) at 6000 rpm
- 189 N⋅m (139 lb⋅ft) at 4800 rpm

==== EJ22 Enhancements and Improvements ====
Beginning in the 1997 model year, the engine for 1997 Legacy and Impreza models had internal and external changes that yield an approximately 10% increase in power and 3% increase in fuel economy. Accomplishing this involves many factors, one of which is engine friction reduction. The pistons were coated with molybdenum to reduce friction. The thin coating reduces moving friction and reduces cylinder wall scuffing. The piston skirt was reshaped and the piston weight was reduced by approximately 100 g (3.5 oz). Compression ratio was increased to 9.7:1 by reshaping the piston crown. This eliminates the clearance that was available between the piston at TDC and the fully opened valve. This transformed the EJ22 into an interference design.

Piston pin offset has been changed to 0.02 in (0.51 mm). Piston to cylinder wall clearance has been reduced by increasing the piston diameter. Another source of high engine friction is the valve train. Hydraulic lash adjusters (HLAs) are always in contact with the valves. The hydraulic pressure of the lash adjuster must be overcome during operation and during the most critical time of engine start. To overcome this situation and to contribute to the total reduction of friction loss, 1997 and later SOHC engines have solid valve adjusters. The scheduled service of this valve train is set at 100,000 miles (160,934 km). SOHC engines now use an adjustment screw to adjust valve clearance. Engines with the earlier HLA are recommended to use 10W30 or 10W40 oil year-round; 5W30 can be used at very low winter temperatures. The roller rocker cam follower system that was introduced on the Impreza engines, is installed on all 1996 model year and later engines. The roller assemblies are not serviceable separately, but the rocker arms may be serviced as individual units. The carbon composition head gaskets with integrated O-rings are interchangeable from left to right on 1990 to 1994 NA engines only.

Other engine modifications (1997): The intake manifold has been reshaped to increase the airflow mass and speed, contributing to improved low and mid engine speed operation. Components located on the intake manifold have been relocated as compared to the 1996 models. EGR Solenoid, Purge Control Solenoid, etc.

1999 Phase 2 Engine Enhancements (from endwrench article H-4 and H-6 service): All engine for 1999 are the Phase 2 design. The Phase 2 engines are a SOHC design, with a newly designed cylinder head. Changes in the Phase 2 engines are as follows:

- the engine and transmission are fastened with six bolts and two studs.
- the thrust bearing has been moved to the number 5 position.
- the oil groove in the number 1 and 3 have been changed to supply additional lubrication to the crank journal.

Additional Phase 2 Engine Features:

- the cylinder head is a two-rocker shaft, solid type valve system with roller followers.
- the valves are positioned at a larger angle than previous model years. The intake valves are positioned 23 degrees off-center with the exhaust valves positioned 20 degrees off-center. Prior model year engines utilized a 15-degree positioning angle.
- head gasket thickness is 0.7 mm (0.03 in).
- the intake rocker arms are marked so they are correctly placed on the rocker shaft when servicing. An IN1 or IN2 will be embossed on each rocker arm. As viewed from the front of the engine the Number 1 intake valve of each cylinder and the number 2 intake valve have an IN1 marked and IN2 marked rocker arm that mates with it. New IN1 rocker arms can also be identified by a Green painted mark on the top of the rocker arm. The IN2 rocker arms have a white mark. Proper positioning is maintained through the use of a wave washer located between the rocker shaft arm and rocker arm shaft support.
- the camshaft is secured to the cylinder head with the camcase. An oil passage in the cylinder head provides the passageway in the camcase with oil that leads to the intake rocker shaft. Oil from the camshaft is collected on the opposite side of the passageway leading to the intake rocker shaft to provide oil to the exhaust rocker shaft.

Note: Cylinder head and camcase must be replaced together (line bored).

- the sparkplug pipe is pressed into the cylinder head and is not serviceable. If it becomes damaged the cylinder head must be replaced. The seals installed onto the ends of the sparkplug pipes seal against the valve covers and should be replaced when the valve cover is removed.
- pistons on the engines have a 0.5 mm (0.020 in) offset, with the engine having a compression ratio of 10.0 to 1. The horsepower has increased to 142 hp (106 kW; 144 PS) at 5600 rpm. Maximum torque is 149 lb⋅ft (202 N⋅m) at 3600 rpm.
- camshaft sprockets are constructed of a resin-type material with a metal key pressed into the sprocket for maintaining proper sprocket-to-shaft orientation.

==== Phase 2 Engines ====
===== EJ221 Naturally Aspirated =====
Usage: 1999 Legacy w/ California Emissions

===== EJ222 Naturally Aspirated =====
Usage: 1999 Impreza w/ California Emissions, 2000–2001 Impreza (all 2.2L)

===== EJ223 Naturally Aspirated =====
Usage: 1999 Impreza & Legacy w/ Federal Emissions

===== Specifications (Phase 2) =====
- Horsepower: 142 bhp (106 kW; 144 PS) at 5600 rpm
- Torque: 202 N⋅m (149 lb⋅ft) at 3600 rpm
- Displacement: 2,212 cc (2.2 L; 135.0 cu in)
- Phase 2 Design Type
- Aspiration: Naturally Aspirated
- Cylinder Configuration: Horizontal Flat — 4 Cylinder
- Valve Train: SOHC, 16 Valve, Resin Type Cam Sprockets, Rubber Timing Belt
- Timing Belt Change Interval: 105,000 miles (169,000 km) (EJ221 & EJ222); 60,000 miles (97,000 km) (EJ223)
- Coolant Capacity: 6.2 US qt (5.9 L)
- Compression Ratio: 10:1
- Cylinder Head Exhaust Port Configuration: Single Exhaust Port Per Head
- Intake Valve Diameter: 36 mm (1.42 in)
- Exhaust Valve Diameter: 31.65 mm (1.246 in)
- Engine Rotation: Clockwise
- Emissions: OBDIIB
- Engine Weight: 265 lb (120 kg)
- Oil Pressure: at 700rpm: 14 psi (0.97 bar); at 5000rpm: 43 psi (3.0 bar)
- Interference Type Engine
- Ignition Timing: 15° / 700rpm
- Valve Clearance: Intake: 0.2 ± 0.02 mm (0.00787 ± 0.00079 in); Exhaust: 0.25 ± 0.02 mm (0.00984 ± 0.00079 in)
- Spark Plug Gap: 1.0–1.1 mm (0.039–0.043 in)
- Fuel Injectors: Top Feed — 5 to 20 Ohm Resistance — 280 cc (17 cu in)/min
- Low Oil Pressure Warning Activation: 2.1 psi (0.14 bar)
- Idle Speed: 700rpm +/- 200rpm
- Fuel Pressure/Flow: 43.4 psi (2.99 bar) at Idle (Flow: 17.2 US gal (14.3 imp gal; 65 L) / Hour)
- Firing Order: 1-3-2-4

=== Turbocharged ===
==== EJ22T ====
Phase one SOHC Turbo, 160 bhp (119 kW; 162 PS) This engine features a Fully closed deck block, Aluminum heads, non intercooled and internal oil squirters for cooling. The internals of the EJ22T are similar to the internals of the EJ22E (NA) with the exception of the Turbo engine utilizing low-compression dished pistons, making the compression ratio 8.1:1. Factory boost pressure on the EJ22T is 8.7psi (.59 Bar)

- Legacy 1991–1994 (North American-spec). There were only 8199 EJ22T models reaching the United States (and Canada?) between 1991 and 1994. The 4-door sedan was called the Sport Sedan (SS) and the 5-door wagon was known as the Touring Wagon (TW). There were many more automatic-equipped models than 5-speeds built as sedans. The wagon was only sold as an automatic.
- Valvetrain: SOHC (16 Valve)
- Displacement: 2,212 cc (2.2 L; 135.0 cu in)
- Bore: 96.9 mm (3.81 in)
- Stroke: 75 mm (2.95 in)
- Compression Ratio: 8.1:1
- Power: 160 bhp (119 kW; 162 PS) at 5,600 rpm
- Torque: 181 lb⋅ft (245.4 N⋅m) at 2,800 rpm
- Fuel System: Multi-Point Fuel Injection
- Firing Order: 1-3-2-4
- Oil: 10w30 (Summer) 5w30 (Winter)

==== EJ22G ====
Phase two closed deck, based on the North American 1991–94 Legacy Turbo EJ22T engine uses the same casting marks but with an updated thrust bearing to position #5 instead of #3. It Uses identical cylinder heads and IHI RHF 5HB turbocharger as a EJ20K STi but with a unique closed deck crank case. The pistons and connecting rods are forged. Although being closed deck, the block does not feature oil squirters for piston cooling, opposed to the EJ20G closed deck block and the USDM-only Legacy EJ22T closed deck block. Popular press often states the power of this engine was more than the factory stated 280 ps, citing that 280 ps was the maximum allowable power car companies in Japan could advertise at the time due to the gentleman's agreement. 305 hp, 300 hp+ "Way more than 280hp", are some examples, though it is impossible to truly substantiate these claims.

- Displacement: 2,212 cc (2.2 L; 135.0 cu in)
- Bore: 96.9 mm (3.81 in)
- Stroke: 75 mm (2.95 in)
- Compression Ratio: 8.0:1
- Valvetrain: DOHC
- Fuel Delivery Electronic Fuel Injection (EFI)

EJ22G Turbo DOHC

- Horsepower: 280 PS (206 kW; 276 bhp) at 6000 rpm
- Torque: 363 N⋅m; 268 lbf⋅ft (37 kg⋅m) at 3200 rpm

Usage:

- Impreza STi 22B GC8 series (JDM)

== EJ25 (2.5L Boxer Turbo/NA) ==
- Displacement: 2,457 cc (2.5L; 149.9 cu in)
- Bore: 99.5 mm (3.92 in)
- Stroke: 79 mm (3.11 in)
- Compression Ratio: 9.5:1 – 10:1 (9.5:1 – 10.7:1 JDM) Naturally Aspirated, 8.0:1 – 9.5:1 Turbo
- Fuel Delivery EFI

=== EJ25D ===
There were two variations of the EJ25D sold in the US market. The engine was introduced in 1996 in the Legacy 2.5GT, LSi, and Legacy Outback. That version of the engine used Hydraulic Lash Adjuster (HLA) heads, was recommended to be run on 91 octane fuel, had lower power and torque ratings than the later 1997–1999 EJ25D, and was only offered with an automatic transmission. In 1997 a revised engine was introduced that used heads with shimmed bucket lifters (rather than the HLAs), was designed to run on 87 octane fuel, and was available with either a manual or automatic transmission. Because of the DOHC valve architecture, the spark plugs are more difficult to service in comparison to SOHC variations. DOHC engines are therefore installed with platinum spark plugs with an extended spark plug service life of 80,000 miles (130,000 km). The 1996 EJ25D uses different pistons than what was used for 1997–1999, which will increase the compression ratio significantly if combined with the 1997–1999 EJ25D heads.

For the Japanese Domestic Market, the EJ25D was advertised from January 1994 and was available from October 1994 in the 250T model Legacy. It was later added to the Grand Wagon/Lancaster. It was of the same basic design as the US market hydraulic EJ25D, with HLA, but had a compression ratio of 9.5:1. These HLA heads had a somewhat hemispeherical combustion chamber design. The engine was "facelifted" with the introduction of the BG9B in mid 1996, to have higher compression, 10.7:1, and solid lifters. The solid lifter heads had a cloverleaf style combustion chamber.

- DOHC (JDM; 1994–1996) — JIS — 118 kW (160 PS; 158 hp) at 6000 rpm and 211 N⋅m (156 lb⋅ft) of torque at 2800 rpm
- DOHC (USDM; 1996) — SAE — 116 kW (157 PS; 155 hp) at 5600 rpm and 190 N⋅m (140 lb⋅ft) of torque at 2800 rpm
- DOHC (JDM; 1996–1998) — JIS — 129 kW (175 PS; 173 hp) at 6000 rpm and 230.5 N⋅m (170 lb⋅ft) of torque at 3800 rpm
- DOHC (USDM; 1997–1999) — SAE — 123 kW (167 PS; 165 hp) at 5600 rpm and 220 N⋅m (162 lb⋅ft) of torque at 4000 rpm

Usage:

- USDM Impreza 2.5 RS 98
- USDM Legacy models: Outback (wagon), SUS (sedan 98–99), LSi (96–97), GT.
- JDM Legacy/Grand Wagon/Lancaster 1994–1998
- USDM Forester 1998

=== EJ251 ===
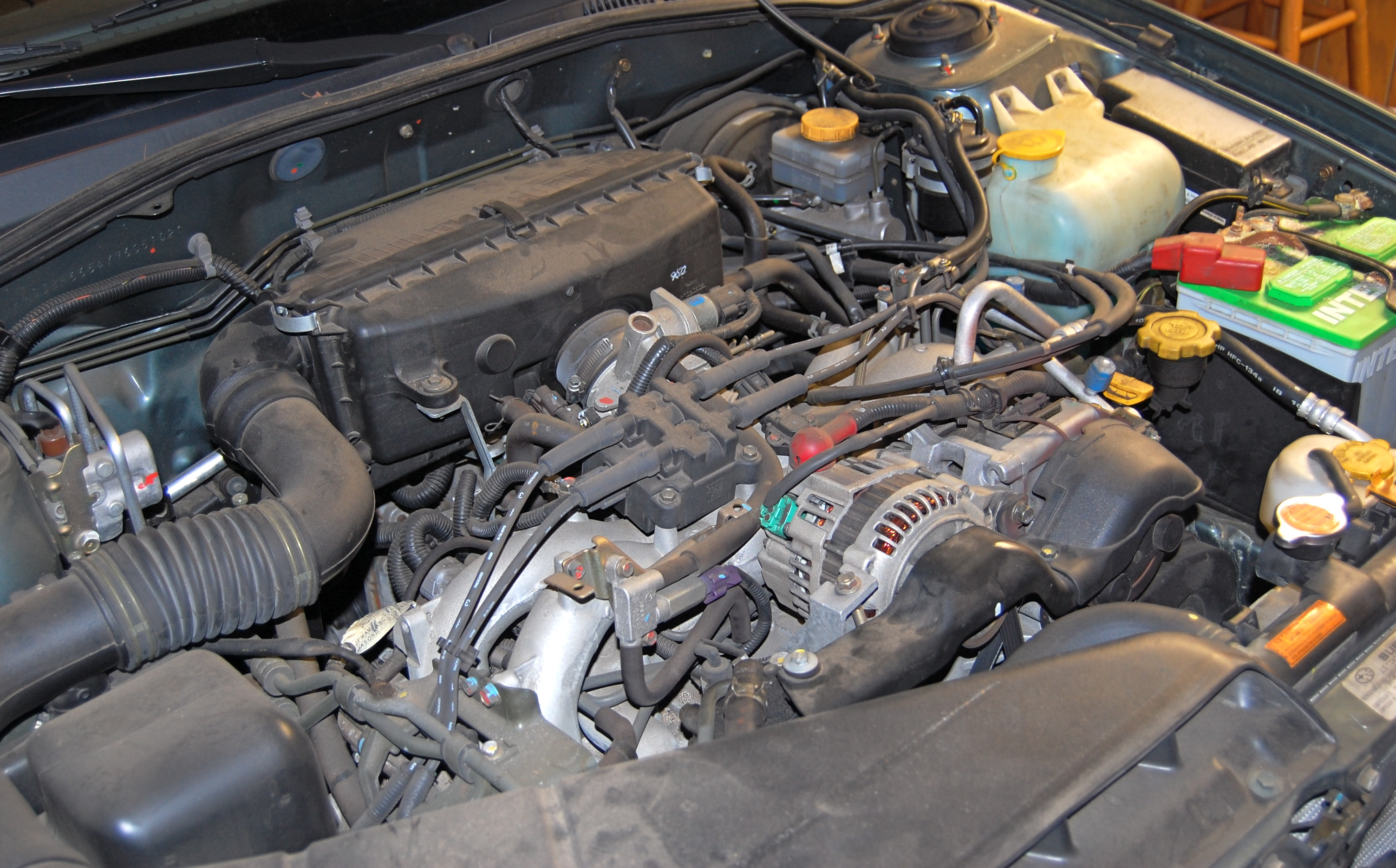
Flat four EJ251

The EJ251 was the first version of the 2.5L single overhead cam (SOHC) engine line by Subaru for the US market. The EJ251 was replaced by the EJ253 in many models due to its improved cooling to aid in head gasket life and improved engine management and sensors. The EJ251 commonly experienced head gasket failures in the form of interior channel breaches or exterior fluid leaks due to the use of a single layer coated gasket, vs the Multi-Layer Steel (MLS) gasket used in later models. Intake air mass is calculated by the use of a MAP sensor and Intake Air Temp Sensor, unlike the EJ253 which uses a MAF sensor. Compression ratio is 10:1.

Power ISO: 123 kW (165 hp; 167 PS) at 5600 rpm and 226 N⋅m (167 lb⋅ft) of torque at 4400 rpm

Usage:

- Impreza 2.5RS, 2.5TS, 2.5OBS 00–04 (US) (excludes 99)
- Forester 98–04 (US)
- Legacy 00–01 (US, 4EAT)
- Legacy 00–04 (US)
- Outback 00–01 (US, 4EAT)
- Outback 02–04 (US)
- Baja 03–05 (US)
- Saab 9-2x Linear 05

=== EJ252 ===
The SOHC EJ252 was only briefly used in North America alongside the EJ251 in the USDM Legacy Outback for the 2000 and 2001 Model Years. They are most commonly found in MY00 Legacy Outbacks manufactured before the end of 1999 while MY00 Legacy Outbacks manufactured in 2000 are rarely designated with EJ252 codes in the VIN. While Subaru has not provided a direct list of revisions between the EJ251 and less common EJ252, there is some degree of information suggesting the EJ252 was simply an alternate version of the EJ251 made to meet California Emissions Standards when the SOHC EJ engines were first introduced in North America. Power output has been reported as ISO 115 kW (156 hp) but is often speculated to share the same specs with the largely identical EJ251. From unofficial analysis, the EJ251 shares the same block, cams, heads, pistons, connecting rods with the EJ252. The only notable differences confirmed are unique intake manifold and throttle body designs to accommodate the different MAP sensor location and IACV location. They also have different cam and crank sprocket reluctor configuration.

Usage:

- Legacy/Outback 00 – 02 (5MT only)

=== EJ253 ===
SOHC — 121 kW (162 hp; 165 PS) at 5600 rpm, 226 N⋅m (167 lb⋅ft) torque at 4400 rpm. Intake volume is monitored by use of a MAF sensor, unlike the EJ251 which is monitored by a MAP sensor.

I-Active valves (VVL intake side) on 2006 models which have ISO 175 hp (130 kW; 177 PS) at 5600 rpm, 229 N⋅m (169 lb⋅ft) torque at 4400 rpm.

PZEV-equipped 2007 and up models have ISO 173 hp (129 kW; 175 PS) at 5600 rpm, 225 N⋅m (166 lb⋅ft) torque at 4000 rpm Compression ratio is 10.1:1.

The EJ253 has an open deck design.

- Impreza 99–01, 04–11
- Legacy, Outback (North America) 05–12
- Legacy [BL/BP] 03–09 (Europe)
- Legacy [BM/BR] 09–12 (Europe, with 123 kW (165 hp; 167 PS))
- Outback 03–09 (Europe)
- Forester 99* (SF), 05–10 (SG, SH)
- Baja 05+
- Saab 9-2x 2.5i 06
- Impreza 2.5RS 04–06

=== EJ254 ===
254 was a 2.5-litre DOHC AVCS motor. This was the first appearance of AVCS (Alongside the EJ204) on an EJ.

1998–2004 — DOHC with 165 hp (123 kW; 167 PS) at 6000 rpm and 235 N⋅m (173 lb⋅ft) of torque at 2800 rpm

Usage:

- Forester T25 1998–2002 (JDM)
- Forester 04–present (certain countries)
- Legacy Lancaster 1998–2003 (JDM)
- Legacy 250T 1998–2003 (JDM)

=== EJ255 ===
DOHC 16-valve turbo with sodium-filled valves originally designed for North American market, now sees usage in some European Imprezas and Legacy models destined for South Africa and Liberty models for Australia. Power 154–195 kW (210–265 PS; 207–261 hp)

EJ255 Version 1: Used in the 2005 and 2006 Legacy, as well as the 2004 and 2005 Forester. This engine uses the same short block and heads as the EJ257 in US 04–06 STI.

EJ255 Version 2: Used in the 2006–2014 WRX, the 2007–2009 Legacy GT, and the 2006–13 Forester XT. This is the newer AIS equipped EJ255, which uses a slightly different AB630 short block, as well as the AB820 heads. The only difference in the short block of this EJ255 and the 04–06 EJ257 is the pistons. They are of nearly the same construction, but have a slightly larger dish volume. Subaru lists the CR at 8.4:1 vs 8.2:1 for the 04–06 STI engine. for the USA market, the EJ255 version 2 engine made an appearance in the 2.5GT trim model of the Impreza, borrowing the engine from the 2008 WRX (the 2009 wrx got an increase in power)

EJ255 Version 3: Used in the 2010–2012 Legacy.DOHC 16-valve turbo with sodium-filled valves originally designed for North American market, now sees usage in some European Imprezas and Legacy models destined for South Africa and Liberty models for Australia. Power 154–195 kW (210–265 PS; 207–261 hp)

Usage in North America:

   Impreza (WRX): 2006–2014
   Forester XT: 2004–2013
   Legacy GT: 2005–2012
   Outback XT: 2005–2009
   Baja Turbo: 2004–2006
   SAAB 9-2X: Linear trim only.

Usage in the rest of the world:

   Legacy/Outback: 2007–present
   Impreza: 2005–present
   Forester: 2005–2010.

=== EJ257 (STI) ===
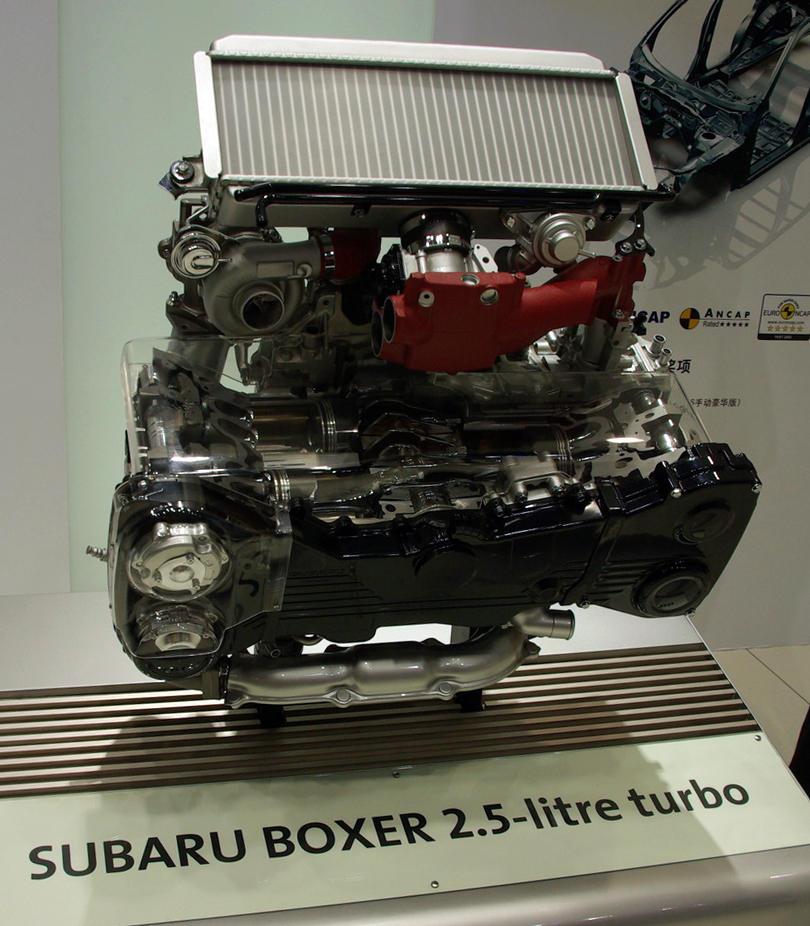
EJ257 engine

DOHC four valves per cylinder fuel feed by Sequential Multipoint Fuel Injection (SMPFI) turbo. Denoting the STI variant of the EJ25, Originally designed for the North American Impreza STI in 2004 with Single AVCS and DBW. 2004–2007 STI models used the same shortblock, B25 heads, and valvetrain as the EJ255 in MY 2005–2006 Legacy GT and the same block as the 2004–2005 Forester XT. Later years used revised block, piston, connecting rods, crankshaft and heads to further improve performance and durability. Notably, the adoption of much improved Dual-AVCS W25 cylinder heads and an improved cylinder block design. MY19 variants of the engine feature a further revised piston design cast from a new alloy for increased strength, further improvements to the general valvetrain, a new ECU and revised engine programming that improved response and widened the torque curve. The engine has an increased redline of 6700 rpm over the WRX EJ255 variant.

Usage:

- US Market Impreza WRX STi MY 2004~2007 300 bhp (304 PS; 224 kW) at 6000 rpm (New SAE standard) and 407 N⋅m (300 lb⋅ft) at 4000 rpm of torque.
- US Market Impreza WRX STI MY 2008~2018 305 bhp (309 PS; 227 kW) at 6000 rpm (New SAE standard) and 393 N⋅m (290 lb⋅ft) at 4000 rpm of torque.
- US Market WRX STI MY 2019–2021 310 hp (314 PS; 231 kW) at 6000 rpm (New SAE standard) and 393 N⋅m (290 lb⋅ft) at 4000–5200 rpm of torque.
- US Market STI S209 MY 2019 341 hp (346 PS; 254 kW) at 6,400 rpm and 330 lb⋅ft (450 N⋅m) at 3,600 rpm of torque.
- US Market Legacy GT/Outback XT MY05~06 256 bhp (260 PS; 191 kW) (New SAE standard)
- US Market Forester XT MY04-05 210 bhp (213 PS; 157 kW)
- ADM WRX STi 08~present 301 PS (221 kW; 297 hp), 41.5 kg⋅m (407 N⋅m; 300 lbf⋅ft)

=== EJ259 ===
Usage: 2004 Legacy, Legacy GT and Legacy Outback (Only Sold in California and New England). Also sold in 2005 Legacy and Outback non turbo models. Engine has a unique setup, most notable is the oval, single port exhaust, three catalytic converters and five air/fuel and oxygen sensors. These engines were also all drive by wire (DBW), and had a three piece intake manifold with a tumble valve in the center section.

== Other Data ==
All the EJ series share compatibility and construction similarity and are 16 valved engines. The EJ series started with the EJ15, a single overhead cam (SOHC) and makes ~90 hp (67 kW; 91 PS), then the EJ16, a single overhead cam (SOHC). Later followed by the EJ20, a 120 hp (89 kW; 122 PS) single overhead cam and the EJ22, a 135 hp (101 kW; 137 PS) single overhead cam. The EJ20 turbocharged version was developed with dual overhead cams, as well as non-turbo DOHC engines and DOHC twin-turbos. The EJ18 and EJ20 were most popular in Europe.

The SOHC EJ Subaru boxer engines were non-interference engines through 1995, run by a single timing belt driving both cams (both sides of the engine) and the water pump. Because they are non-interference engines, if the timing belt fails, the engine of the models up to 1995 will not be damaged. The oil pump is driven directly from the crank shaft and the waterpump by the timing belt. All DOHC and 1998–up SOHC EJ engines are interference engines, if the timing belt fails the valves will likely be damaged.

All Subaru EJ engines have a 1-3-2-4 firing order, which, given the longer exhaust runners on cylinders 2 and 4 causes the characteristic "subaru boxer rumble".

Some of the 2005 and later Subaru vehicle Engines (especially the turbo charged engines) are using CAN bus as their sole Vehicle/Vessel speed input channel. When those ABS Speed signal are removed, the ECU will force the Engine to run in limp home mode. This has posed some challenge for people who try to use the same automotive boxer and engines on Aerospace application, engine replacement for aged Subaru vehicles, and VW Vanagon modifications, etc.

The following table has details on a few of the commonly modified Subaru engines:

| Block | EJ205 | EJ207 | EJ255 | EJ257 | EJ257 |
|---|---|---|---|---|---|
| Head Type | US WRX | Spec C | US WRX | US STI | EU STI |
| Bore | 92 mm (3.62 in) | | 99.5 mm (3.92 in) | | |
| Crank Stroke | 75 mm (2.95 in) | | 79 mm (3.11 in) | | |
| Rod Length | 130.43 mm (5.135 in) | | | | |
| Piston Pin Offset | .3289 mm (0.01295 in) | .3159 mm (0.01244 in) | .3088 mm (0.01216 in) | | |
| Deck Height | 201 mm (7.9 in) | | | | |
| Gasket Thickness | 0.8 mm (0.031 in) | | | | |
| Head Volume | 51 cc (3.1 cu in) | 50 cc (3.1 cu in) | 51 cc (3.1 cu in) | 57 cc (3.5 cu in) | 50 cc (3.1 cu in) |
| Piston Dish | 12 cc (0.73 cu in) | 8 cc (0.49 cu in) | 24 cc (1.5 cu in) | 22 cc (1.3 cu in) | |
| Piston Deck | 0.38 mm (0.015 in) | 1.48 mm (0.058 in) | 0.39 mm (0.015 in) | | |
| Total Quench Height | 0.98 mm (0.039 in) | 2.08 mm (0.082 in) | 0.99 mm (0.039 in) | | |
| Total Quench Volume | 8.51 cc (0.519 cu in) | 13.83 cc (0.844 cu in) | 7.7 cc (0.47 cu in) | | |
| Total Deck Volume | 18.51 | 19.83 | 29.7 | | |
| Swept Volume | 498.57 cc (30.425 cu in) | 498.57 cc (30.425 cu in) | 614.25 cc (37.484 cu in) | | |
| Compresses Volume | 89.51 cc (5.462 cu in) | 89.83 cc (5.482 cu in) | 85.31 cc (5.206 cu in) | 83 cc (5.1 cu in) | 79.7 cc (4.86 cu in) |
| Static Compression Ratio | 8.17:1 | 8.14:1 | 8.4:1 | 8.2:1 | 8.71:1 |
| Rod to Stroke Ratio | 1.74 | | 1.65 | | |
| Engine Displacement | 2.0 L (1,994 cc) | | 2.5 L (2,457 cc) | | |

All Spec C are Japanese only EJ207.

== Awards ==
Subaru Turbo Boxer engine won 'best engine' in the 2.0 to 2.5 litre category in both the 2006 and 2008 International Engine of the Year awards. It also won a place on the list of Ward's 10 Best Engines in 2004 and 2010.
