= Active valve lift system =

Automobile variable valve timing technology

The Intelligence-Active Valve Lift System (i-AVLS) is a valvetrain technology implemented by Subaru in their 2.5 L SOHC naturally aspirated engine to improve emissions, efficiency and performance. Note that AVLS is different from AVCS used on other Subaru engines. AVLS improves performance and efficiency by changing which camshaft is operating which of the two intake valves. The camshafts on all AVLS Subaru engines have specially designed lobes for intake valves. They feature two different cam profiles: a low/mid lift profile or a high lift profile. The two intake valves in each cylinder are operated by a rocker arm with its own cam lobe. The cam utilized is selected by the engine control unit (ECU). To select different valve lift modes, oil pressure generated by the engine moves a pin which locks the two lobes together. At low engine speeds the low/mid lift camshafts increases the speed of air rushing into the engine thereby increasing torque and efficiency. At higher engine speeds the high lift camshafts fully open the intake valves, reducing resistance to incoming air and improving power. AVLS only operates one of the intake valves in each cylinder as the other is always open to promote swirl.
