= Active valve control system =

Automobile variable valve timing technology

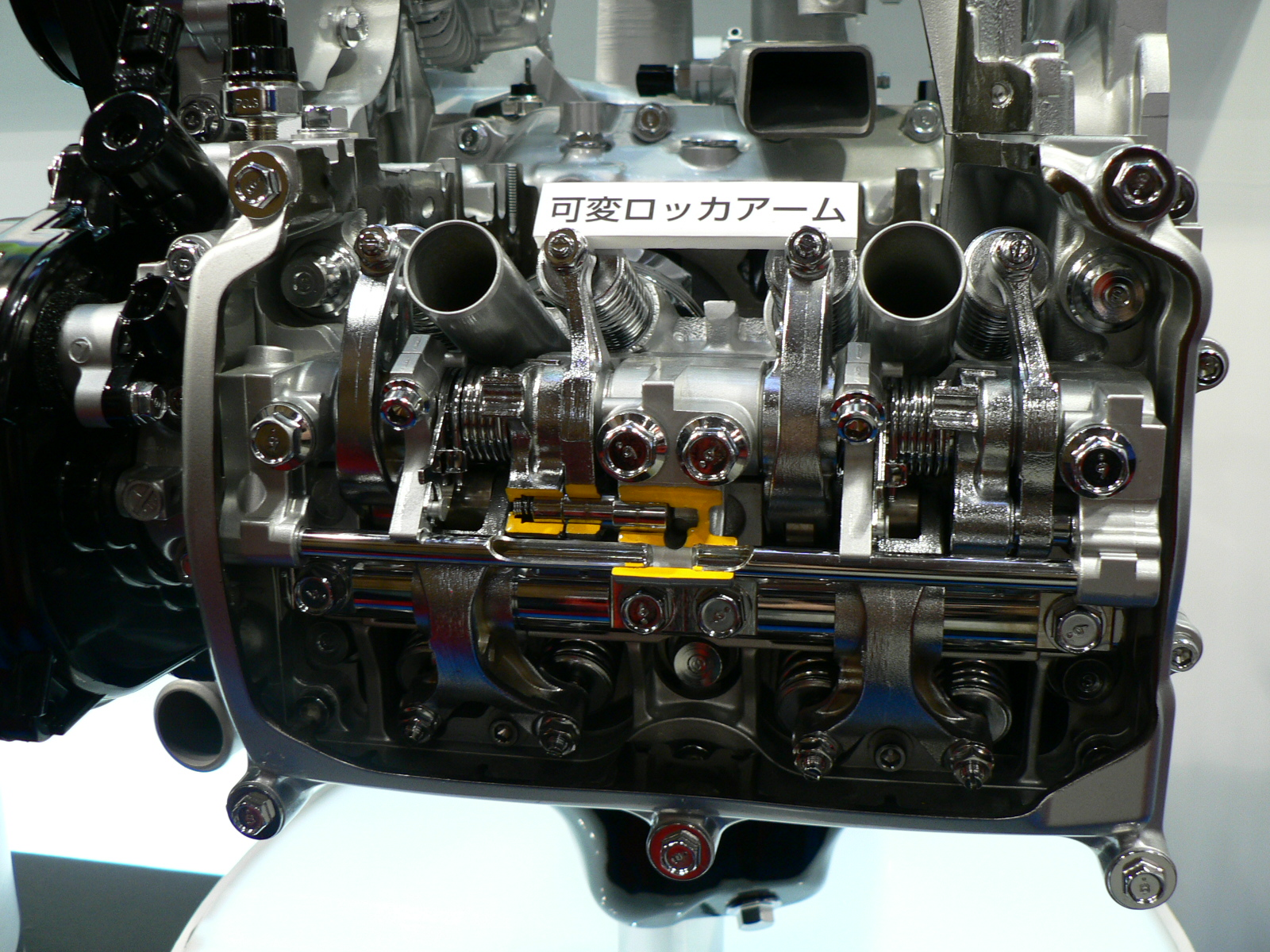

The active valve control system (AVCS) is an automobile variable valve timing technology used by Subaru. It varies the timing of the valves by using hydraulic oil pressure to rotate the camshaft, known as "phasing", in order to provide optimal valve timing for engine load conditions. The system is closed loop using the camshaft sensors, crankshaft sensors, air flow meter, throttle position as well as oxygen sensors and/or Air-Fuel ratio sensors in order to calculate engine load. The ECU is programmed to operate control valves that adjust the delivery of the hydraulic pressure in order to move the camshaft into the position that will provide the engine with the best performance while meeting emissions standards.

AVCS is used on the Version 7 and up EJ207 engines, the EJ204, EJ254, EJ255, EJ257, the second generation EZ30D (2005+ in the USA market) found in the Legacy Outback, Legacy 2.0R, 3.0R and the B9 Tribeca.

A dual AVCS system phases both the intake and exhaust camshafts on the EZ36 found in the 2008+ Tribeca, 2009+ Outback 3.6R, 2009+ Legacy 3.6R, and on the 2008+ STi EJ257 (W25 heads). Dual AVCS is present on the new FA20 engines in the 2015+ WRX, Forester and BRZ and the FB20 engines in the 2012+ Impreza / Crosstrek, though they actuate with a different method than those of the older engines. Dual AVCS is also found on Japanese-spec engines, notably the late model EJ207s in the WRX STI.

== AVCS ==
The implementation of AVCS is quite different from AVLS. The latter only changes the cam profile that's operating the two valves.

In AVCS, the engine computer (ECU) can command a solenoid which advances or retards the camshaft rotation by up to 35 degrees.

By retarding the cams at idle or very low engine loads, a smoother, easier idle can be achieved. From idle through medium engine loads, AVCS advances the intake valves to begin opening during the last part of the exhaust stroke, when the exhaust valves are still slightly open. Some of the pressure created during the exhaust stroke flows into the intake manifold, having the effect of exhaust gas recirculation (EGR). The intake valves also close earlier during the intake stroke. This helps with engine efficiency and fuel economy.

At very high engine loads, AVCS advances the intake valves further to open even sooner during the exhaust stroke. This produces a scavenging effect – that is, intake airflow helps clear the cylinder of exhaust gas. It also closes the intake valves sooner on the compression stroke. This results in improved volumetric efficiency, increased dynamic compression, and helps to generate higher power output.

== See also ==
- AVLS
