= Subaru six-cylinder engines =

The Subaru six-cylinder engines are a series of flat-6 engines manufactured by Subaru, made in three distinct generations. The ER27, derived from the Subaru EA first-generation flat-4, was used as the sole engine option in the premium model 1988–91 Subaru Alcyone VX (XT6 in the United States). The EG33, derived from the Subaru EJ second-generation flat-4, was used exclusively in the successor Subaru Alcyone SVX, again as its sole engine option, sold from 1991–96. The EZ series, consisting of the EZ30 and EZ36 models, was designed to be almost as compact as the EJ25 flat-4. The EZ30/36 were the first Subaru six-cylinder engines available outside the sport coupes, used as the uplevel option for Subaru Legacy (2002–19) and Outback/Lancaster (2001–19) as well as the sole option in the Subaru Tribeca (2006–14).

== ER DEZ ==
Subaru ER27
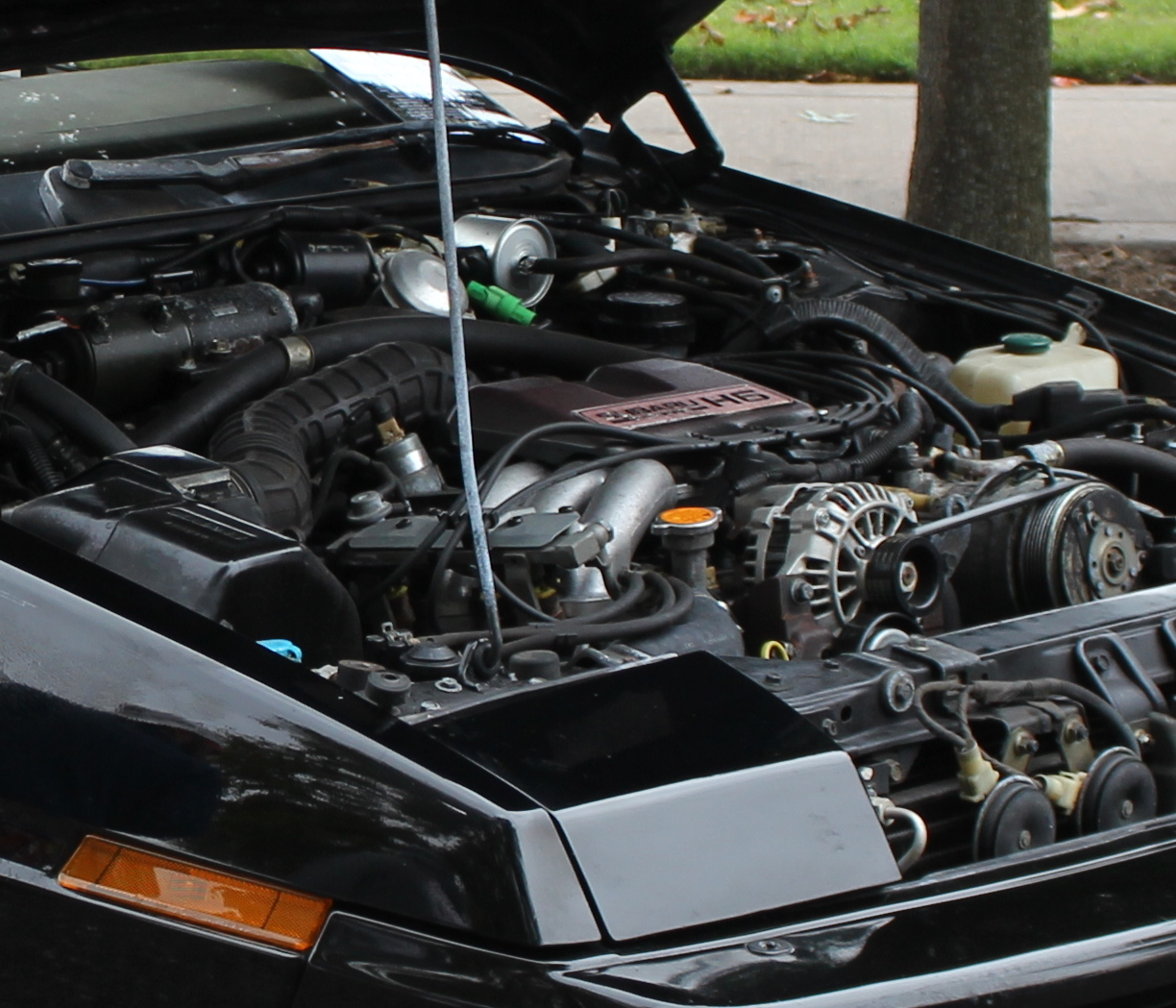

Overview
- Manufacturer: Subaru
- Production: 1988–1991

Layout
- Configuration: flat-6 petrol engine
- Displacement: 2.7 L: 2,672 cc (163.1 cu in)
- Cylinder bore: 92 mm
- Piston stroke: 67 mm
- Cylinder block material: aluminium
- Cylinder head material: aluminium
- Valvetrain: SOHC
- Compression ratio: 9.5:1

Combustion
- Fuel type: Petrol/gasoline

Output
- Power output: 112 kW (150 hp; 152 PS) @5200 rpm
- Torque output: 211 N⋅m (156 lb⋅ft) @4000 rpm

Chronology
- Successor: EG33

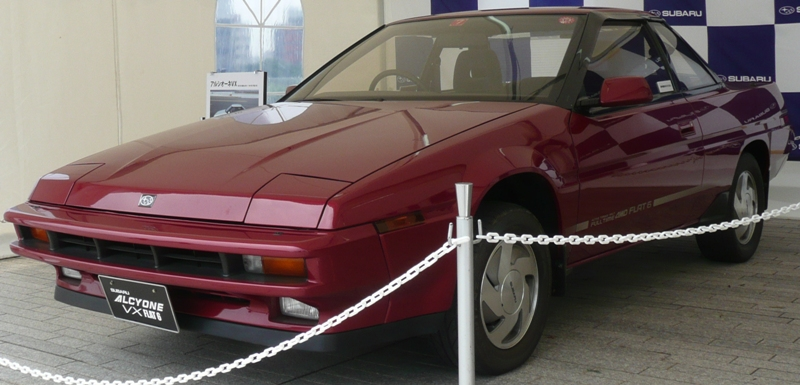
Subaru Alcyone VX

Created as a refined luxury engine with improved power over the EA82T, Subaru introduced the ER27 engine in November 1985 for the Subaru ACX-II concept car, shown at the Tokyo Motor Show and billed as the 'concept car of the near future.' The concept went into production as the Subaru Alcyone VX (Subaru XT6 in North America) in August 1987, the exclusive application for the ER27.

When the ER27 was introduced, it was the only water-cooled flat-6 automobile engine on the market. The ER27 designation was the first time Subaru incorporated the engine's displacement into the engine designation and all subsequent engine codes have retained this nomenclature.

=== Design ===
Like the EA series engines, the ER27 engine featured two valves per cylinder heads (six valves per cylinder head) with hydraulic lash adjusters and the ER27 and EA engines shared the same bore, stroke, and spacing. While recognised as bearing many similarities to the Subaru EA82 engine, there are numerous differences in design between the two engines, and a large portion of parts are unique to the ER27. For instance, the oil and water pumps are unique to the ER27, sharing similar bolt patterns and design to the EA82, but being of a higher flow in both cases.

The intake manifold uses a two-piece design with a lower section bolting to the heads containing the coolant bridge, injectors and various vacuum lines. The upper intake manifold then bolts to the lower section and is unlike the EA82 or EJ22 "spider" manifold designs in that there is no central plenum chamber.

The valve timing system is belt-driven using two individual timing belts. Curiously, one belt uses a spring tensioner (like the EA82) whilst the other uses a hydraulic tensioner (like the EJ22).

Both JDM and USDM versions of the ER27 used multi-point electronic fuel injection. In North America, the ER27 was slightly derated to 145 hp (108 kW; 147 PS) at 5,200 rpm and 156 ft⋅lb (212 N⋅m) at 4,000 rpm.

== EG33 ==
Subaru EG33
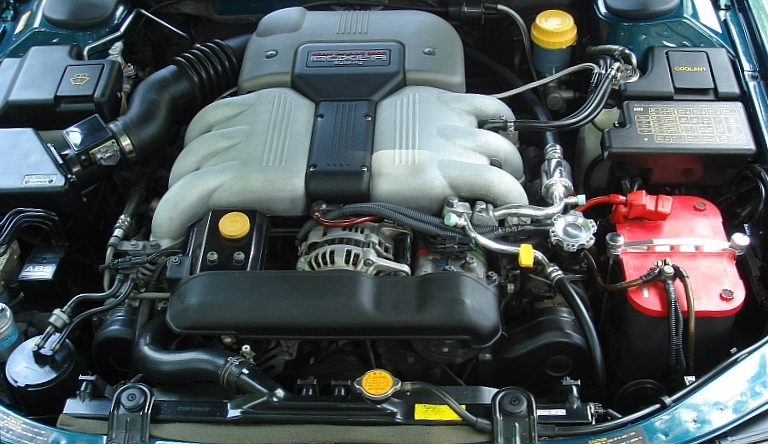

Overview
- Manufacturer: Subaru
- Production: 1991–1996

Layout
- Configuration: flat-6 petrol engine
- Displacement: 3.3 L: 3,318 cc (202.5 cu in)
- Cylinder bore: 96.9 mm
- Piston stroke: 75 mm
- Cylinder block material: aluminium, cast-iron cylinder liners
- Cylinder head material: aluminium
- Valvetrain: DOHC
- Compression ratio: 10.0:1

Combustion
- Fuel type: Petrol/gasoline

Output
- Power output: 179 kW (240 hp; 243 PS) @6000 rpm
- Torque output: 309 N⋅m (228 lb⋅ft) @4000 rpm

Chronology
- Successor: EZ30; EZ36

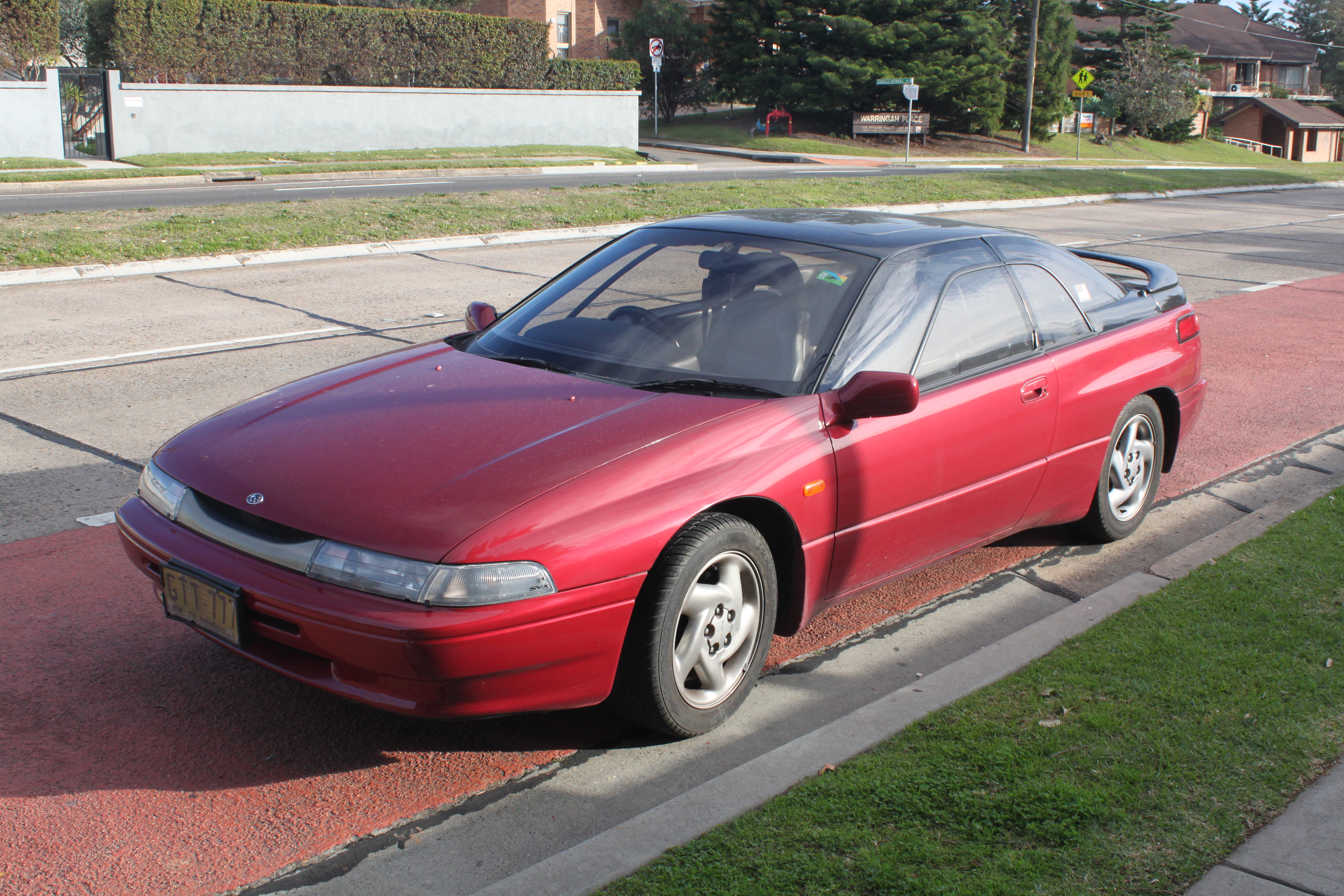
Subaru Alcyone SVX

Similar to how the six-cylinder ER27 is related to the earlier four-cylinder EA82, the EG33 shared bore and stroke dimensions with the contemporary four-cylinder EJ22. The EG33 was exclusively fitted to the Alcyone SVX, where it was paired with the 4EAT automatic transmission in both front- and all-wheel-drive configurations.

After the SVX was discontinued, Subaru did not offer a six-cylinder engine until the EZ30 was developed and released for the Subaru Outback.

=== Design ===
Unlike the SOHC EJ22 it shared some dimensions with, the EG33 featured dual overhead cams; both engines used four valves per cylinder. The EG33 used a single toothed timing belt which drove the exhaust camshafts on each bank in addition to the water pump (mounted on the right bank); the intake camshaft on each cylinder bank was driven in turn by a set of helical gears via the belt-driven exhaust camshaft.

At the time, the EG33 was the largest naturally aspirated engine that Subaru had ever made for regular production; in the 1990s, Subaru branded the Subaru 1235, a 3.5 L flat-12 engine designed by Carlo Chiti and Motori Moderni, intended for Formula 1 racing. Heavy, underpowered, and fragile, it met with no success and never qualified for a Formula 1 race. Later, Christian von Koenigsegg reportedly was interested in a modified version of the engine for his supercar.

For the 2026 Super GT season, Subaru is fitting a heavily modified EG33 into its BRZ GT300 racecar, referring to it as the "EG33改". This version of the engine has had its displacement reduced to 3.0 L, but features twin turbochargers.

== EZ30 and EZ36 ==
Subaru EZ engine
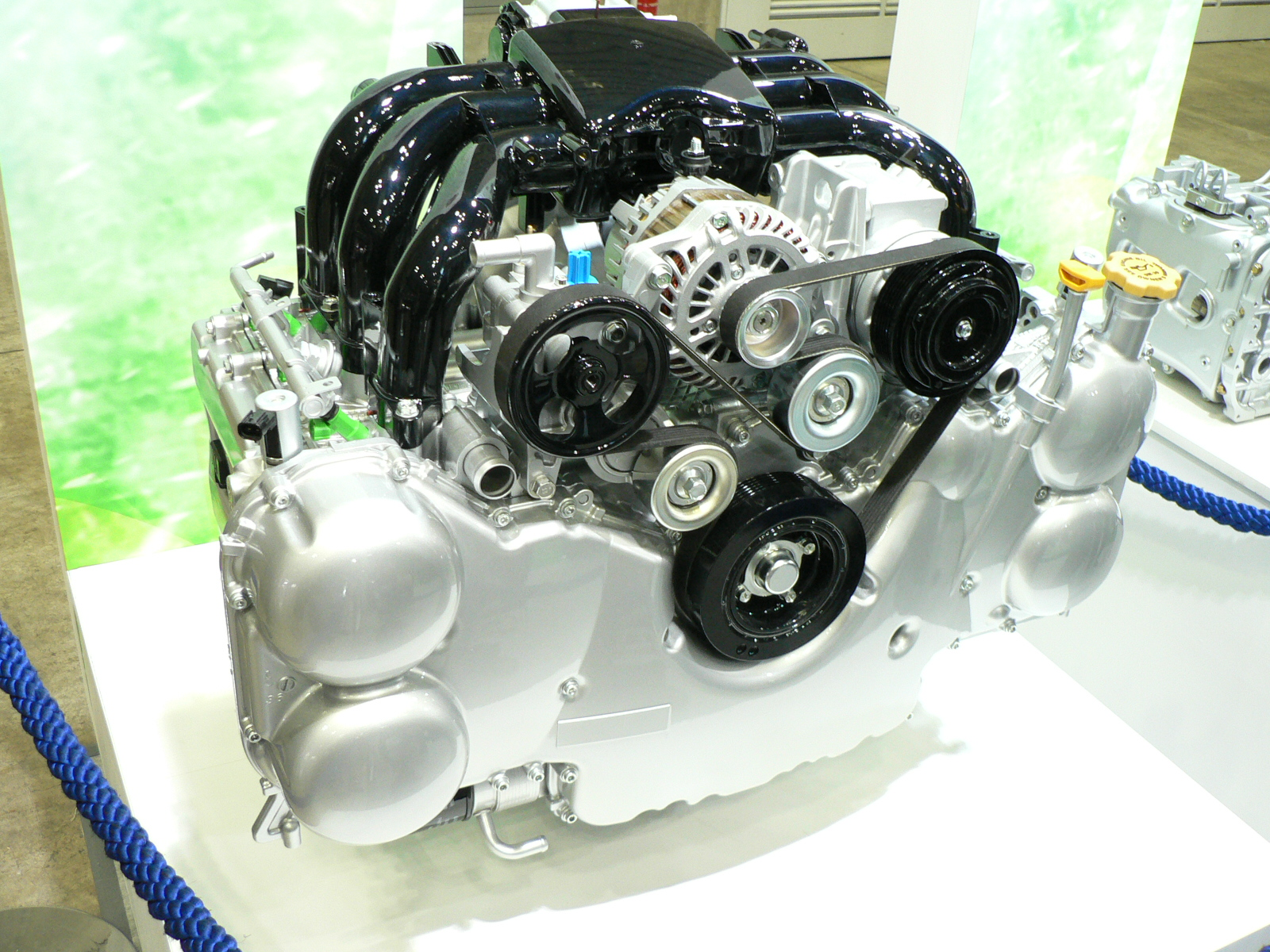

Overview
- Manufacturer: Subaru
- Production: 2001–2009 (EZ30); 2007–2019 (EZ36)

Layout
- Configuration: flat-6 petrol engine
- Displacement: 3.0 L (EZ30): 2,999 cc (183.0 cu in); 3.6 L (EZ36): 3,629 cc (221.5 cu in)
- Cylinder bore: 89.2 mm (EZ30); 92 mm (EZ36)
- Piston stroke: 80 mm (EZ30); 91 mm (EZ36)
- Cylinder block material: aluminium
- Cylinder head material: aluminium
- Valvetrain: DOHC
- Compression ratio: 10.7:1 (EZ30); 10.5:1 (EZ36)

Combustion
- Fuel type: Petrol/gasoline

Output
- Power output: 162 kW (217 hp; 220 PS) @6000 rpm (EZ30); 180 kW (241 hp; 245 PS) @6600 rpm (EZ30 II); 191 kW (256 hp; 260 PS) @6000 rpm (EZ36)
- Torque output: 289 N⋅m (213 lb⋅ft) @4400 rpm (EZ30); 297 N⋅m (219 lb⋅ft) @4200 rpm (EZ30 II); 335 N⋅m (247 lb⋅ft) @4400 rpm (EZ36)

Chronology
- Predecessor: EG33
- Successor: FA24F

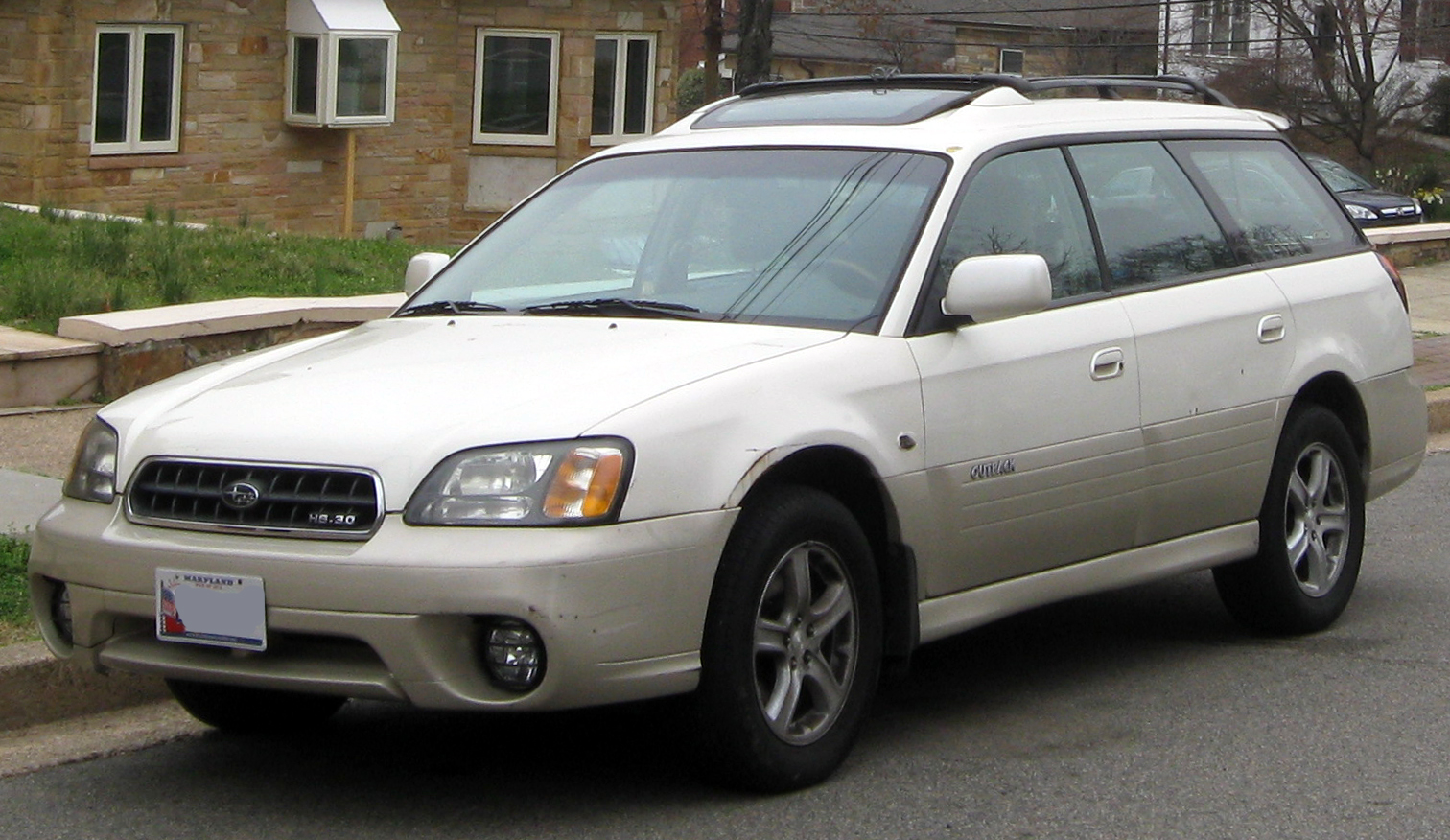
Subaru Outback H6-3.0 (BH)

In the United States, the EZ30 was introduced in the Outback H6-3.0 in November 2000 for the 2001 model year. In Japan, the EZ30 was introduced in the equivalent Lancaster 6 wagon in May 2000. A twin-turbo version of the EZ30 was produced for the Subaru B11S concept car, unveiled at Geneva in 2003. The EZ30 was refreshed in 2003, and when the Tribeca was introduced for the 2006 model year in January 2005, the EZ30 II was the sole engine option.

The EZ36 was introduced with the restyled Tribeca for the 2008 model year, and replaced the 3.0 L EZ30 in the Legacy and Outback starting in 2009 for the 2010 model year.

Starting with the 2020 model year, the six-cylinder EZ36 was dropped as the uplevel engine option for Subaru Legacy and Outback automobiles and instead the premium engine offered was the turbocharged four-cylinder FA24F, which was previously introduced for the 2019 model year as the sole engine option for the Subaru Ascent, the successor to the Tribeca.

EZ series application
Engine	Legacy / Outback		Tribeca		Power	Torque
EZ30D mk I	2000–04	Outback H6	N/A		162 kW; 217 hp; 220 PS @ 6,000 rpm	289 N⋅m; 213 lb⋅ft @ 4,400 rpm
EZ30D mk I	2000–03	Lancaster 6	N/A		162 kW; 217 hp; 220 PS @ 6,000 rpm	289 N⋅m; 213 lb⋅ft @ 4,400 rpm
EZ30D mk I	2002–03	GT30	N/A		162 kW; 217 hp; 220 PS @ 6,000 rpm	289 N⋅m; 213 lb⋅ft @ 4,400 rpm
EZ30D mk I	2002–03	RS30	N/A		162 kW; 217 hp; 220 PS @ 6,000 rpm	289 N⋅m; 213 lb⋅ft @ 4,400 rpm
EZ30 Turbo	— (Note: Fitted to 2003 concept Subaru B11S only, never produced in volume.)				294 kW; 394 hp; 400 PS @ 6,400 rpm	550 N⋅m; 410 lb⋅ft @ 3,600 rpm (Note: Torque peak between 3,600 and 4,800 rpm.)
EZ30D mk II (Note: Sometimes misidentified as "EZ30R". Subaru never designated an engine with this code. Revisions include the addition of variable valve timing (intake) and three exhaust ports per cylinder head.)	2004–09	3.0R	2006–07	(all)	180 kW; 241 hp; 245 PS @ 6,600 rpm	297 N⋅m; 219 lb⋅ft @ 4,200 rpm
EZ36D	2010–19	3.6R	2008–14	(all)	191 kW; 260 PS; 256 hp @ 6,000 rpm	335 N⋅m; 247 lb⋅ft @ 4,400 rpm

=== Design ===
==== EZ30D mk I ====
The design of the EZ30 is credited to Noriaki Sekine. Unlike prior Subaru flat-6 designs, the EZ30 has a significantly smaller bore pitch (the distance between adjacent cylinder centerlines on each bank of the engine block) than the contemporary flat-4 EJ-series. The bore pitch of the EZ30 is 98.4 mm (3.87 in), compared to a bore pitch of 113 mm (4.4 in) in the EJ series. The EZ30 also used a timing chain to drive the camshaft, while the earlier flat-4 EJ series uses a timing belt instead. These changes resulted in a more compact block; the external dimensions of the EZ30 are similar to the EJ25 four-cylinder engine, with length increasing by less than 1 inch (2.5 cm), allowing for easier fitment in existing vehicles.

A butterfly valve in the intake manifold opened at higher engine speeds, shortening the intake length and providing a passive supercharging effect through resonance. The exhaust was also equipped with a valve which opened at high backpressure, increasing the effective muffler volume.

In North America, the EZ30 was derated slightly to 158 kW; 215 PS (212 hp) and 280 N⋅m (210 lb⋅ft).

==== EZ30D mk II ====
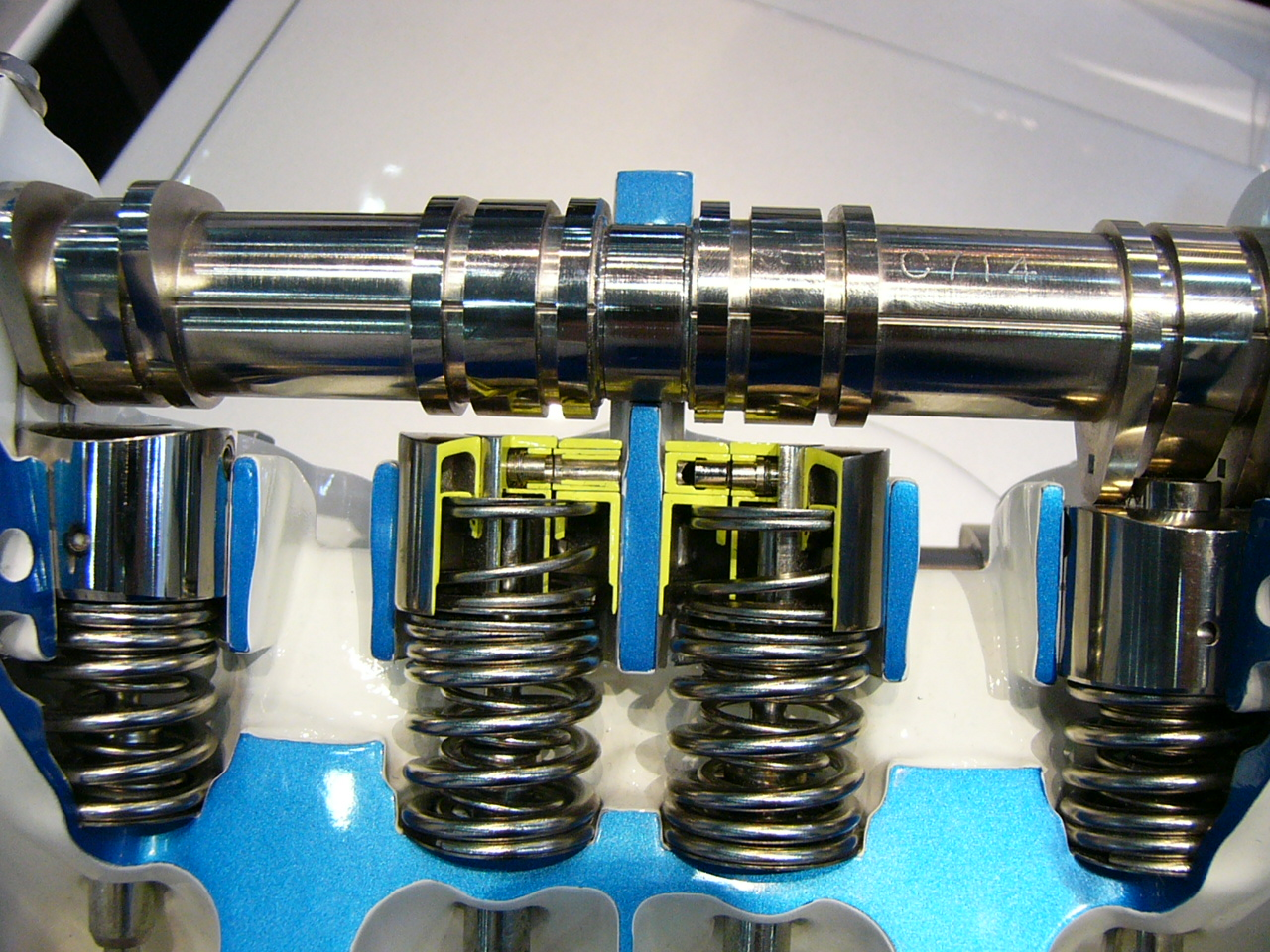
Cutaway of switching tappet for Subaru AVLS fitted to EZ30D mk II

For the 2004 model year, the EZ30 was revised to add the Subaru active valve lift system to the intake cam, a system similar to Porsche's VarioCam, providing both variable valve timing and lift for the intake valves, which resulted in increased power, torque, and economy. The cylinder heads for the EZ30D mk II were also revised to include three exhaust ports per head instead of the single exhaust port used in the original EZ30D mk I, which gathered the exhaust from each cylinder bank into a single port. Other detail improvements included a new block casting and a reduction in overall weight by 8.91 kg (19.6 lb), achieved through the use of hollow-journal camshafts, reducing the number of bolts in the timing chain cover, and switching to a plastic intake manifold.

==== EZ36 ====
Compared to the EZ30, the EZ36 has larger bore and stroke; the EZ36 uses slightly thinner iron cylinder sleeves to increase bore, and uses asymmetric connecting rods to allow for an increase in stroke. A change to the cam drive resulted in an engine that was slightly longer than the preceding EZ30 by 0.83 in (21 mm), but maintained the same width. A revised cooling system and variable valve timing (AVCS was now fitted to both intake and exhaust valves) allowed the EZ36 to run on regular unleaded fuel, instead of the premium unleaded required by the EZ30.
