= Flat-six engine =

Horizontally opposed 6-cylinder piston engine

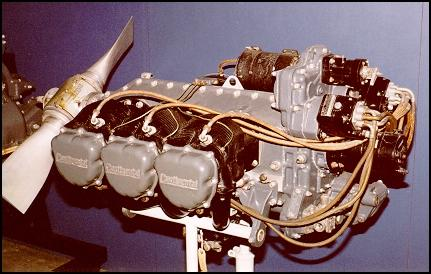
Continental O-470-13A air-cooled aircraft engine

A flat-six engine (also known as a horizontally opposed-six engine) is a six-cylinder piston engine with three cylinders on each side of a central crankshaft. The most common type of flat-six engine is the boxer-six engine, where each pair of opposed cylinders moves inwards and outwards at the same time. An alternative configuration for flat engines is a 180-degree V engine, where both cylinders move to the right then the left at the same time.

The advantages of the flat-six layout are good engine balance (for reduced vibration), a low center of gravity, short length (compared with an inline-six engine) and being well suited to air-cooling. The disadvantages are a large width (which can limit the maximum steering angle when used in a front-engined car), a large intake manifold being required when a central carburetor is used, and duplication of the inlet and outlet connections for water-cooled engines.

The first production flat-six engine was in the 1904 Wilson-Pilcher 18/24 HP car. The most notable use of flat-six engines is the Porsche 911 sports car, which has used flat-six engines continuously since 1963. Several other car manufacturers, including Subaru, have produced flat-six engines at times. Flat-six engines have also occasionally been used in motorcycles, and commonly in general aviation aircraft, along with the flat-four engine.

== Engine balance ==
A boxer-style flat-six engine is able to have perfect primary and secondary balance. As in other six-cylinder engines, the overlapping of the power strokes of the different cylinders (with a firing interval of 120 degrees in a four-stroke engine) reduces the pulsating of the power delivery relative to that of similar engines with fewer cylinders.

In a boxer configuration, a flat-six engine does not have a rocking couple. The symmetry of the arrangement, in which one bank of three cylinders is mirrored by the other bank, means that there is no net force from any given mirrored cylinder pair along the axis of movement of the pistons. So not only is there no net primary or secondary reciprocating effect, there is no net turning force - moment - that would try to rotate the engine back and forth about its engine mountings. (The moment is not quite zero in practice because each cylinder pair is offset slightly from the other, or else they would clash at the crankshaft.) In this regard, the six cylinder boxer engine is the same as a flat-four boxer engine, which also does not experience any rocking couple.

These characteristics result in low vibration for flat-six engines (as in straight-six engines), especially when compared with the imbalances that are present in V6 engines with a 90-degree bank angle.

== Use in aircraft ==
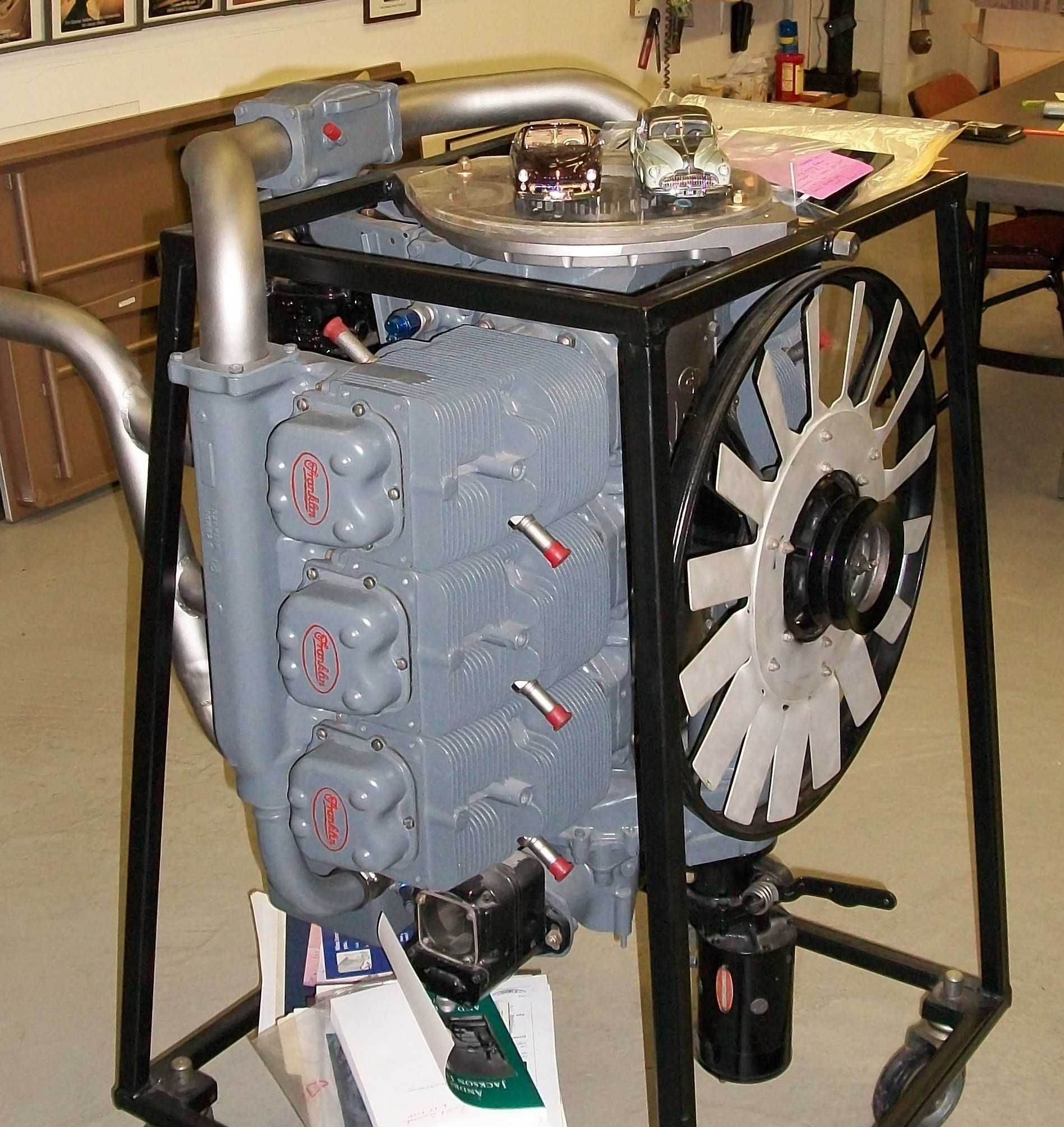
1945–1975 Franklin O-335 air-cooled aircraft engine

Early flat-six engines include the Franklin O-265 which began production in 1940, and the Lycoming O-435 which began production in 1942. Several manufacturers use the letter O in their model codes for flat-layout engines as a designation for “opposed” cylinder layouts. The Franklin O-335 was used in the Bell 47 light helicopter.

Flat engines largely replaced the historically more popular radial engines in small aircraft after World War II because they were less expensive to manufacture. The smaller frontal area compared with a radial engine also results in less drag, although the radial design offers improved cooling.

Some aircraft have used flat-six engines originally designed for cars. The Porsche PFM 3200 engine, produced from 1985 to 1991, was based on the engine used in the Porsche 911 sports car. Several examples of the Pietenpol Air Camper homebuilt monoplane aircraft have used the air-cooled engine from the Chevrolet Corvair compact car. Compared with the engines used in cars, flat-six engines used by helicopters have large displacements and are low revving, producing more torque and less power.

A notable recent flat-six aero-engine is the 4-litre side-valve Belgian D-Motor LF39, a modular variant of the 2.7-litre flat-four D-Motor LF26. Although the side-valve format has long been abandoned for most automotive applications because its combustion chamber is a bar to high engine rpm, the massively over-square (1.295:1) D-Motor is a very simple, low-revving, compact, reliable lightweight aero-engine (without the heavy (and bulky) complication of ohv valve-gear).

== Use in automobiles ==
=== Porsche ===
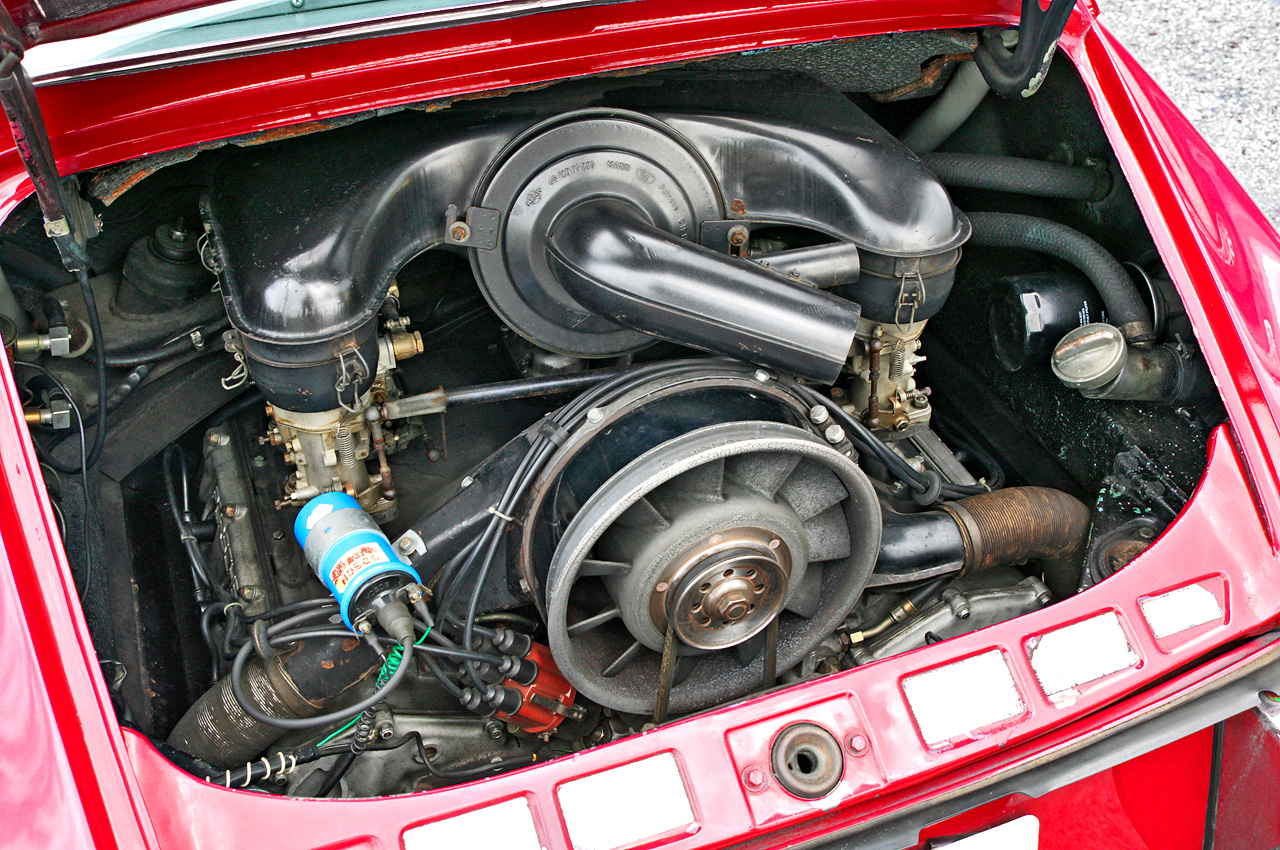
1966 Porsche 911

1967 Porsche 911R

2006 Porsche Cayman S

The flat-six engine is often associated with the Porsche 911, a rear-engined sports car which has used flat-six engines exclusively since 1963. The engines were air-cooled until 1999, when Porsche started using water-cooled engines.

Other Porsche models that use flat-six engines are the 1970–1972 Porsche 914/6 (mid-engine), the 1986–1993 Porsche 959 (rear-engine), and the 1996–2021 Porsche Boxster/Cayman (mid-engine).

=== Other manufacturers ===
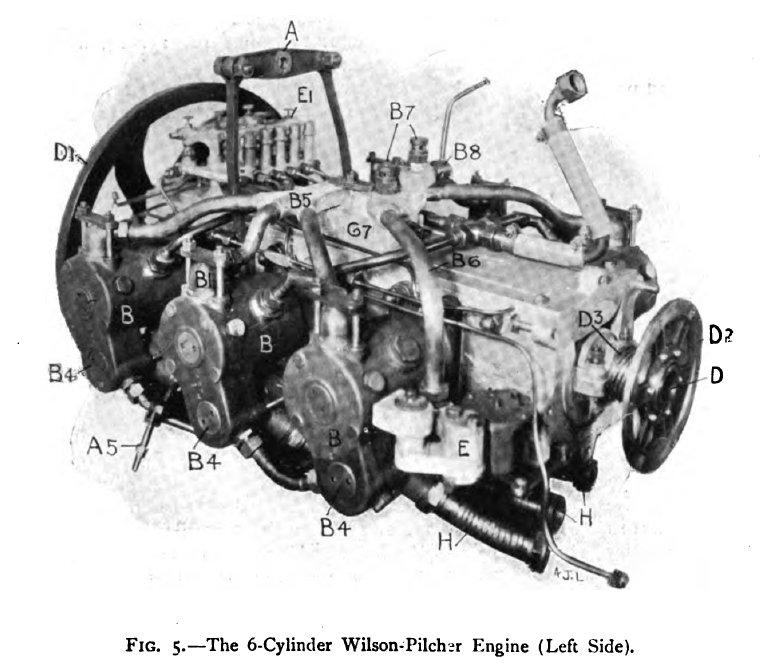
1904 Wilson-Pilcher engine

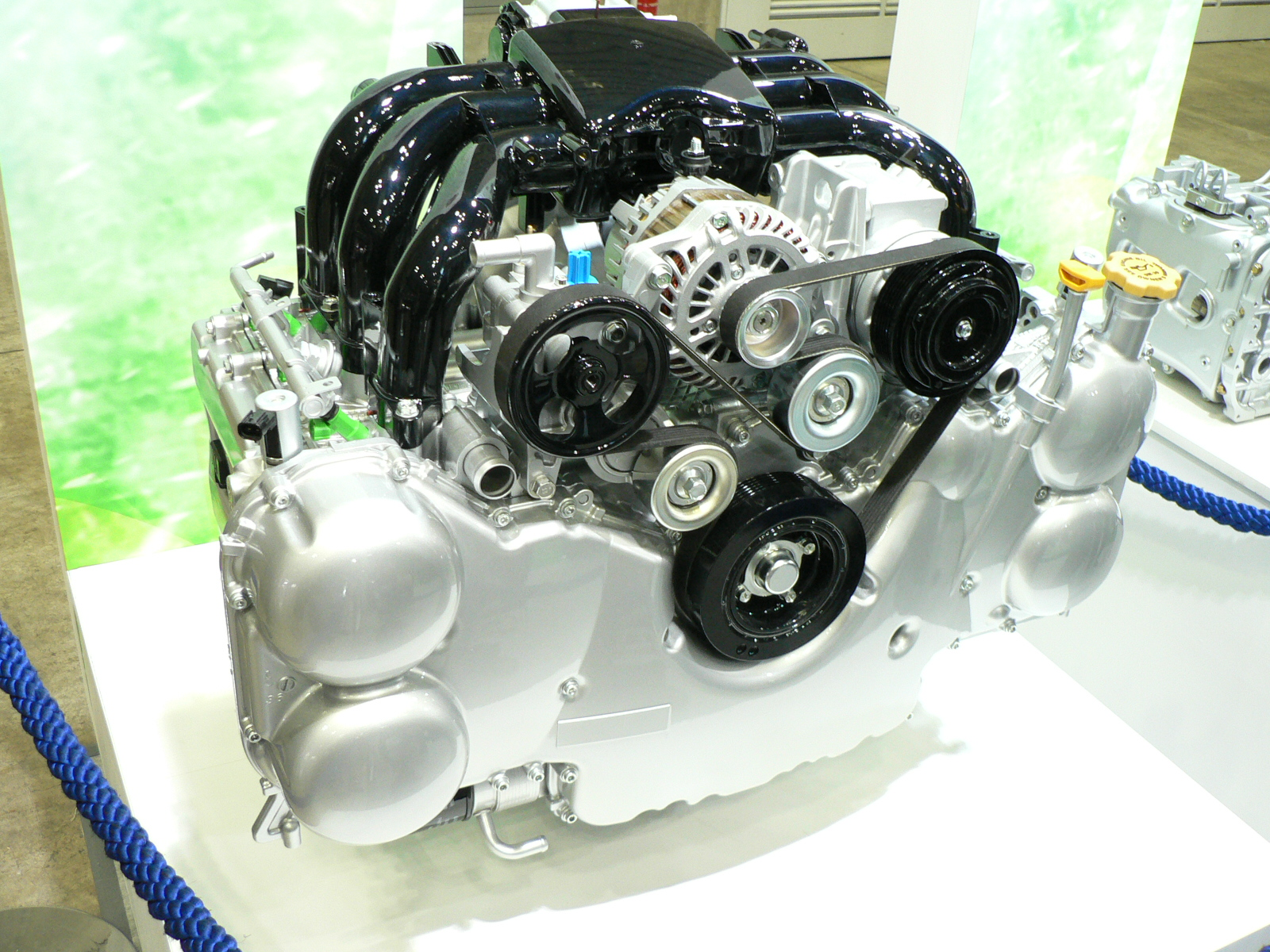
2007–2019 Subaru EZ36 engine

The first car to use a flat-six engine was the 1904–1907 Wilson-Pilcher 18/24 HP, which used an engine based on a flat-four engine with two cylinders added. The Wilson-Pilcher was a front-engined car with the crankshaft in-line with the chassis and the cylinders between the chassis rails. Reports on this car quote it as being "remarkably silent and smooth running" and "almost total absence of vibration".

Two American manufacturers briefly produced cars with flat-six engines—the 1948 Tucker 48 (water-cooled, based on the Franklin O-335) and the 1960–1969 Chevrolet Corvair (air-cooled). Both are rear-engined cars with rear-wheel drive. Chevrolet produced over 1.8 million Corvairs of various types and utilized a turbocharger on some models; one of the first uses of a turbocharger on a mass-produced automobile.

Japanese manufacturer Subaru produced water-cooled flat-6 engines from 1988–1996 and 2000–2019. Their first flat-6 engine, the Subaru ER27, was added to the model range of the Subaru XT coupe. In 1991, the Subaru EG33 engine was used in the Subaru Alcyone SVX, the replacement for the Subaru XT. Following a hiatus of flat-6 engine production for four years, the Subaru EZ30 engine was introduced in the 2000 Subaru Legacy/Outback. The Subaru EZ36 engine was introduced in 2007 and was produced until 2019. All engines were used in front-engine cars with all-wheel drive, plus the XT and Alcyone SVX were also available with front-wheel drive.

== Use in motorcycles ==
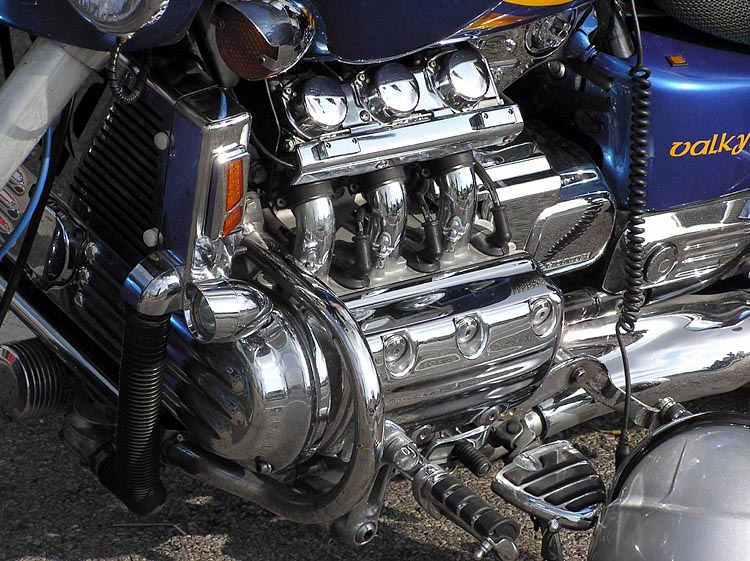
1997–2004 Honda Valkyrie engine

Most motorcycles use engines with four or fewer cylinders, however the Honda Gold Wing touring motorcycle has used a water-cooled flat-six engine since 1988. Initially, the engine had a displacement of 1.5 L (92 cu in), until it was enlarged to 1.8 L (110 cu in) in 2001.

The Honda Valkyrie F6C (1997–2003) was a cruiser based on the GL1500 Gold Wing. The limited edition 2004 Valkyrie Rune was based on the GL1800.

== See also ==
- Inline-six engine
- V6 engine
