= List of Subaru transmissions =

Subaru motor vehicles have used manual, conventional automatic, and continuously variable (CVT) transmissions. Subaru manufactures its own manual and CVT transmissions (for non-Kei cars). Since the 2014 model year, the conventional automatic transmissions in North American-spec Subaru vehicles have been replaced with Lineartronic CVTs (with one exception : the BRZ)

== Automatic ==
=== Three-speed ===
All of Subaru's three speed automatic transmissions were made by Jatco.

==== 3AT ====
- Gear Ratios: 1st 2.600 2nd 1.505 3rd 1.000 Rev 4.100
- Usage: 1975–1979 Subaru Leone

==== 3AT 1st revision ====
- Gear Ratios: 1st 2.600 2nd 1.505 3rd 1.000 Rev 2.166
- Usage: 1980–1982 Subaru Leone

==== 3AT ====
The 3AT was a hydraulically controlled 3AT with available Single-Range 4WD.

- Gear Ratios: 1st 2.821 2nd 1.559 3rd 1.000 Rev 2.257
- Usage: 1983–1984,1990-1994 Subaru Leone 1985–1989 Subaru XT and Subaru BRAT

=== Four-speed ===
Subaru built their own four-speed automatic transmission based on the old Jatco design. It was available in FWD and Full-time awd.

==== ACT-4 or VTD ====
Subaru uses two types of traction delivery systems, called Active Torque Split (ACT), or the performance oriented Variable Torque Distribution, called VTD. ACT drives the front wheels directly and the rear wheels through a hydraulic clutch. The control unit monitors several factors including vehicle speed, gear position, and wheel speed and then varies the application of the clutch based on a model stored in memory. The effect is a constantly and actively changing torque to the rear wheels anywhere from a few percent to fully locked. The control unit can and does alter torque several times per second. Vehicles with higher power engines use a more aggressive model resulting in generally higher rear engagement. Later attempts at reducing customer confusion resulted in torque split numbers being given, but these have no meaning as there is no mechanical or other device to provide a static starting point for the control unit. This system is the more commonly used setup used on most Subaru products after its introduction on the XT6. VTD adds a twin planetary center differential to the clutch and therefore has a static, starting torque split calculated on the planetary gear ratio, with the most common being 45:55. The active clutch operation is similar to the ACT system, although the clutch is used to suppress differential action instead of as the differential itself. VTD was introduced on the Alcyone SVX in 1991 and is usually found in performance models equipped with a turbocharger, along with the VDC outback and USDM 2003–2004 Legacy GT/2.5GT. ACT and VTD are found in both generations of the 4 speed while the 5 speed uses only VTD.

==== 4EAT ====
This transmission was released in 1988 for use in the Subaru XT6 and Leone Touring Wagon. The bellhousing and input shaft were changed for the Subaru EJ engine, the first was used until about 1998, when a major redesign of the holding devices was released. The second generation saw use until 2008.

- Gear Ratios: 1st 2.785 2nd 1.545 3rd 1.000 4th 0.694 Rev 2.272
- Some versions had gear ratios of 1st 3.030 2nd 1.620 3rd 1.000 4th 0.694 Rev 2.272
- Usage: 1988–1991 Subaru XT, 1990–2009 Subaru Legacy, 1992–1997 Subaru Alcyone SVX, and all Subarus 1995–2009

The Ford Motor Company also uses a transmission on some Ford, Kia Motors, Mercury, and Mazda products called the F-4EAT, which shares some similarities with the Subaru, since they are both manufactured by Jatco. The Nissan Pathfinder has also used this transmission in the past with an external transfer case attached.

=== Five-speed ===
In 2003, Subaru released the 5EAT w/ SportShift, based on the Jatco JR505 transmission.

==== 5EAT ====
- Gear Ratios:

1st 3.540 2nd 2.264 3rd 1.471 4th 1.000 5th 0.834 Rev 2.370

Final Drive Ratio: 3.583, 3.272 or 3.083

The final use of the 3.272 final drive ratio (Part 38100AB740) was in the 2009 Legacy 3.0R Limited sedan (but not the regular R sedan), the 2009 Outback 2.5XT Limited (but not the regular XT), and the 2009 Outback 3.0R Limited (but not the regular R or LL Bean).

The first use of the 3.083 final drive ratio (Part 38100AB730) was in the 2007 Legacy GT. The final use was in the 2014 Legacy and Outback with the EZ36 engine.

- Usage: 2005-2014 Subaru Legacy GT, 3.0R, and 3.6R; Subaru Outback XT, 3.0R, and 3.6R; Subaru Tribeca; Subaru Forester s-edition

The Tribeca with ez-36 (3.6R) and early Outback XT used the 3.583 final drive ratio.

=== Six-speed ===
Subaru made a one off paddle-shift AWD transmission for their B11S Concept car built off the 5EAT platform.

==== 6EATT ====
- Gear Ratios: 1st 3.636 2nd 2.264 3rd 1.471 4th 1.000 5th 0.834 6th 0.700 Rev 3.272
- Usage: B11S Concept Car Only

==== A960E ====
Manufactured by Aisin/Toyota.

- Gear Ratios:

1st 3.538 2nd 2.060 3rd 1.404 4th 1.000 5th 0.713 6th 0.582 Rev 3.168

- Usage: 2012+ Subaru BRZ

== Continuously variable ==
=== 1989–1994 Subaru Justy ECVT/Justy 4WD ECVT ===
Subaru developed a CVT for the Subaru Justy to gain reasonable acceleration and fuel economy from its small three cylinder engine. It employs a push-belt system and comes with an optional 4WD unit that engages the rear wheels when a button on the shifter is depressed. It also has a 'sport mode' that, when activated, nearly doubles engine RPM for better torque distribution when towing or going uphill. The Shift Indicator reads P-R-N-D-Ds, Ds stands for Drive Sport, which doubles engine RPM. The CVT transmission proved unreliable after accumulating high mileage, causing Subaru to stop exporting cars with CVTs outside of Japan until the fifth generation Legacy/Outback. Subaru did continue to build Kei cars with CVTs, only for sale in Japan. In addition to improving the design of the transmission over the years, Subaru has supplied other companies with CVTs, as well. The Justy ECVT was also available with hydraulically actuated 4WD (unlike the 5MT Justy, which has pneumatic actuation) in November 1988, this model was called the Justy 4WD ECVT.

- Gear Ratios: Infinite
- Usage: 1989–1994 Subaru Justy, 1990–1997 Subaru Sambar

=== Subaru Lineartronic CVT TR690 and TR580 ===
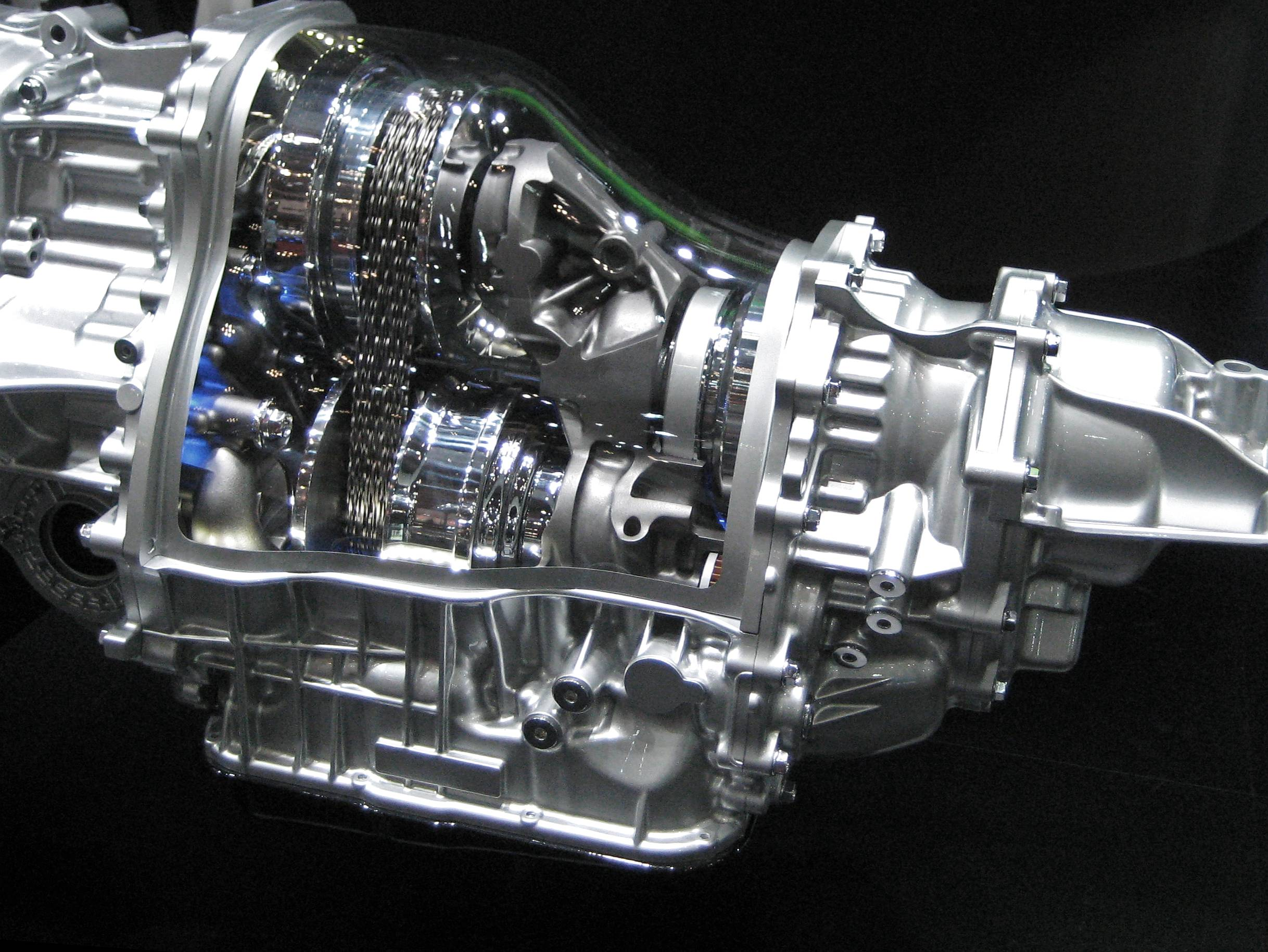
Lineartronic CVT transmission

The fifth generation Legacy/Outback and the Subaru Exiga received a newly revised CVT under the Lineartronic name. It is a metal chain, pulley-based CVT, which is considered the most reliable, due to the simplicity of the pulley system and durability of the metal chain. In addition, the metal chain pulley system is generally quieter than other CVT designs.

In the US, the Lineartronic is available with the 2.5i engine in the Outback, Legacy and Forester(2014), and the 2.0 FB engine in the Impreza and slightly modified for the XV Crosstrek. In SE Asia this transmission is also available for the 2.0i engine for the 2010 and later Legacy Asia spec. Subaru claims that the transmission provides "uninterrupted power that maximizes fuel efficiency while keeping the engine at the optimal rev range". EPA mileage estimates for the CVT with the 2.5i, naturally aspirated based engine, claim 30 MPG highway (29 Outback, 31 Legacy).

Lineartronic uses a specially modified torque converter to connect the engine to the transmission. It can slip like a traditional torque converter, but remains locked under all conditions except when coasting or traveling at very low speed. The persistent lockup condition under acceleration provides the efficiency and control of a clutch while still behaving much like a traditional planetary automatic transmission. The transmission can also be manually controlled by the driver by providing the ability to select 6 or 7 (if paired with a Diesel engine) or 8 different "virtual" gears, where the transmission will hold a particular ratio.

Subaru owners have complained about the Lineartronic CVT transmission main problem of engine shuddering or stalling when the car comes to a complete stop. It also pointed high repair and maintenance costs of its torque converter. and Subaru extended the warranty for cars from model years 2010 to 2018.

- Gear Ratio Range: 3.581:1 - 0.570:1 (varies by trim and vehicle)
- Final Drive: 3.7:1
- Spread: ~6.28:1
- Usage: 2010–current Subaru Legacy / Outback / Exiga / Impreza / Levorg / Forester / XV and 2015 Subaru WRX Premium and Limited Editions.

TR580

- 2012–present Impreza 2.0L NA
- 2024–present Impreza 2.5L NA
- 2013–present Crosstrek 2.0L NA
- 2021–present Crosstrek 2.5L NA
- 2013–present Legacy/Outback FB25 2,498cc NA
- 2014–present Forester 2.5L NA
- 2014–2020 Levorg 1.6L Turbo
- 2019–2020 Levorg 2.0L NA

Maximum torque 250Nm

TR690

- 2010–2012 Legacy/Outback EJ253 2,457cc NA
- 2015–2019 Legacy/Outback 3.6L NA
- 2014–2018 Forester 2.0L Turbo
- 2015–2021 WRX 2.0L Turbo
- 2014–2020 Levorg 2.0L Turbo
- 2019–present Ascent
- 2020–2025 Legacy/Outback 2.4L Turbo
- 2026–present Outback 2.4L Turbo
- 2022–present WRX 2.4L Turbo
- 2022–present Levorg 2.4L Turbo

Maximum torque 400Nm

== Manual ==
=== Four-speed ===
Subaru made several four speed transmissions from 1970–1989, they are listed below.

==== T71 ====
- Gear Ratios: 1st 3.307 2nd 1.944 3rd 1.344 4th 0.942 Rev 4.100
- Usage: All 1970–1982 FWD

==== T71A 1st revision ====
- Gear Ratios: 1st 3.636 2nd 1.950 3rd 1.193 4th 0.769 Rev 3.583
- Usage: All 1983–1989 Subaru Leone FWD 1600cc

==== T71W 4WD ====
- Gear Ratios: 1st 4.090 2nd 2.157 3rd 1.379 4th .971 Rev 4.100, Low Range 1.462
- Usage: 1975–1980 Subaru Leone and 1978–1981 Subaru BRAT

==== T71W 4WD 1st revision ====
- Gear Ratios: 1st 3.666 2nd 2.157 3rd 1.266 4th .885 Rev 4.100, Low Range 1.462
- Usage: 1981 Subaru Leone 1600cc

==== T81W 4WD ====
- Gear Ratios: 1st 3.636 2nd 1.950 3rd 1.266 4th .885 Rev 3.583, Low Range 1.462
- Usage: 1981 Subaru Leone 1800cc

==== T81W 4WD 1st revision ====
- Gear Ratios: 1st 3.636 2nd 1.950 3rd 1.193 4th .769 Rev 3.583, Low Range 1.462
- Usage: 1982–1989 Subaru Leone 1800cc and 1982–1993 Subaru BRAT (EA-81 engine only)

=== Five-speed ===
==== T71G ====
- Gear Ratios: 1st 3.666 2nd 2.157 3rd 1.266 4th .885 5th .725, Rev 4.100
- Usage: 1975–1982 Subaru Leone

==== T71G ====
- Gear Ratios: 1st 3.636 2nd 2.157 3rd 1.266 4th .885 5th .725, Rev 3.583
- Usage: 1983–1989 Subaru Leone 1600cc

==== T81G ====
- Gear Ratios: 1st 3.371 2nd 1.950 3rd 1.266 4th .885 5th .725, Rev 3.583
- Usage: 1983–1989 Subaru Leone 1800cc (EA-81 Engine ONLY)

==== 5MT EA ====
1st 3.636 2nd 1.950 3rd 1.344 4th .971 5th .783, Rev 3.583

- Usage: 1985–1994 Subaru Leone

==== 5MT ====
This was the only five-speed 4WD transmission made for the Subaru Leone

- Gear Ratios: 1st 3.545 2nd 1.947 3rd 1.366 4th .972 5th .780, Rev 3.416 Low Range 1.59
- Usage: 1985–1994 Subaru Leone and 1985–1989 Subaru XT 1800cc

==== 5MT full-time ====
This transmission was Subaru's first full-time 4WD transmission, only used in the Alcyone/XT6, and 3 door RX. In EU Leone turbo wagon.

- Gear Ratios: 1st 3.545 2nd 2.111 3rd 1.448 4th 1.088 5th .871, Rev 3.416 Low Range 1.196
- Usage: 1988–1991 Subaru XT-6

==== 5MT Justy ====
The Justy used a transaxle, rather than a conventional Subaru transmission. This transmission was dropped in 1994 when you could only get a 4WD unit.

- Gear Ratios: 1st 3.071 2nd 1.695 3rd 1.137 4th .823 5th .675, Rev 3.461 Final 4.437
- Usage: 1984–1993 Subaru Justy

==== 5MT Justy 4WD ====
After its introduction in 1984, the Justy was also available with 4WD and thus a different gearbox. The gear ratios for this gearbox were altered slightly. In 1994 the normal/FWD gearbox was dropped; one could only get a 4WD gearbox by then.

- Gear ratios: 1st 3.071 2nd 1.695 3rd 1.137 4th .771 5th .631, Rev 3.461 Final 5.200
- Usage: 1984–1994 Subaru Justy

==== 5MT ====
It is notable to mention that only Turbo vehicles received a hydraulic clutch until 1995. Also, in 1998 Subaru changed from a push-style clutch to a pull-style, on turbo models, requiring minor bellhousing and fork changes.

- Gear Ratios: 1st 3.785 2nd 1.945 3rd 1.500 4th 0.994 5th 0.780/(0.735 WRX) – Final 4.11 (3.90 WRX)
- Usage: All 1990–2003 with EJ-Engine

MY 96–99 Transmission specs (and possibly other years)

- Gear Ratios: 1st 3.545 2nd 2.111 3rd 1.448 4th 1.088 5th 0.825 (FWD) / 0.780 (AWD) / 0.871 (Outback AWD) --- Final 3.454 (FWD) / 3.900 (AWD) / 4.111 (Forester, Outback AWD)

Source: 1996 Subaru Legacy Service Manual/1999 Subaru Forester Service Manual

Also matches 1999 Legacy 30th Anniversary

==== 5MT revised ====
- Gear Ratios: 1st 3.454 2nd 2.062 3rd 1.448 4th 1.088 5th 0.871 Rev 3.545

different ratios for 2006–07

- Usage: All 2003–2011 Subaru Non-Turbo

==== 5MT revised 2012+ ====
- Gear Ratios: 1st 3.454 2nd 1.888 3rd 1.296 4th 0.972 5th 0.738 Rev 3.333 Final 4.111
- Usage: All 2012–Present Subaru Non-Turbo

=== Six-speed ===
==== SJ Forester 2.5i ====
1st 3.454 2nd 1.888 3rd 1.296 4th 0.972 5th 0.780 6th 0.695 R 3.686 Final 4.444:1

==== SJ Forester 2.5i, Impreza WRX STi and Legacy spec. B ====
There are several six speed manual transmissions currently available for USDM Subarus, found in the STi, Legacy Spec B, and 2015 WRX. The STi's 6MT has undergone various changes throughout the years, but have always had a limited slip front differential with Driver Controlled Center Differential (DCCD). In 2006, The STi's 6MT underwent some changes that included increasing the preload on the center differential and a slight lengthening of some gears. The Spec. B's 6MT has different gear ratios (specifically 6th gear being longer) than the STi's unit, does not have the STi's DCCD system but rather a standard Subaru center viscous coupling center differential, and the front differential is not a limited slip unit. The Spec B's 6MT ratios are highly prized by some due to its longer ratios than those found in the WRX STi, while still retaining much of the STi unit's robustness.

- Gear Ratios : 1st 3.636 2nd 2.375 3rd 1.761 4th 1.346 5th 0.971 6th 0.756 Rev 3.545 (This applies to the 04–05 STi, and not the Legacy Spec B)
- Gear Ratios : 1st 3.636 2nd 2.235 3rd 1.590 4th 1.137 5th 0.891 6th 0.707 Rev 3.545 (This applies to the 06+ STi, and not the Legacy Spec B)
- Usage: 2004+ Subaru WRX STi and 2005+ Subaru Legacy spec. B
- Early 2004 WRX STi models came with axle stubs inserted in the transmission with female front axles. Late 2004 WRX STi models came without the stubs and instead had male front axles.
- The 2004 and 2005 model WRX STi 6MT was a final drive of 3.90. In 2006 and 2007 the 6MT came with a final drive of 3.545 which made the 2006 and 2007 much sought after for the non-STi WRX owners as a transmission swap. This is due to the R160 rear differential 3.545 final drive of most of the non-STi WRXs.
- Pre 2008 model year WRX STi 6MT versions utilizes a self-contained oil system with a trochoidal oil pump mounted in the rear of the transmission case. This capability was removed for 2008 and later years. Subaru chose a simplified splash/scraper lubrication system. However, the oil pump-equipped 6MT version is still listed as the transmission of choice in the STi Group N parts system, even for the 2015+ model year WRX STi, with the option of mounting a homologated transmission oil cooler. Subaru Tecnica International's choice to continue using the oil pump-equipped 6MT for Group N racing, originally for the 2007 model years and older, led to the assessment that oil pump transmissions are still favored for motorsport/heavy duty applications. As such, 2008+ WRX STi 6MT with the splash/scraper oil system is a byproduct of a cost-saving measure from Subaru, which may have determined an intricate lubrication system was not necessary for a showroom/production vehicle until it would be converted for motorsport use.

Model	1st	2nd	3rd	4th	5th	6th	Reverse	Final Drive	Torque Split F/R	Front Diff	Center Diff	Rear Diff
Impreza WRX STi MY01-04 TY856WH3MA	3,636	2,375	1,761	1,346	0,971	0,756	3,545	3,900	35/65	A.P. Suretrac	Viscous Coupling (DCCD system MY03 onwards)	Viscous LSD
Impreza WRX STi MY01-04 TY856WH4MA	3,636	2,375	1,761	1,346	0,971	0,756	3,545	3,900	35/65	A.P. Suretrac	automatic electromechanical DCCD system	Viscous LSD
Impreza WRX STi MY05-07 TY856WW6MA	3,636	2,375	1,761	1,346	0,971	0,756	3,545	3,900	35/65	Helical LSD	automatic electromechanical DCCD system	Viscous LSD
WRX STi MY08-14 TY856UB1KA	3,636	2,235	1,590	1,137	0,891	0,756	3,545	3,900	41/59	Helical LSD	electronic (08–16 electromechanical) DCCD system	Torsen LSD
WRX STi MY15-18 TY856UW6AA	3,636	2,235	1,521	1,137	0,971	0,756	3,545	3,900	41/59	Helical LSD	electronic (08–16 electromechanical) DCCD system	Torsen LSD
WRX STi MY19-21 TY856UW6AB	3,636	2,235	1,590	1,137	0,971	0,756	3,545	3,900	41/59	Helical LSD	electronic (08–16 electromechanical) DCCD system	Torsen LSD
SJ Forester 2.5i 2014-2018	3.454	1.888	1.296	0.972	0.780	0.695	3.686	4.444:1	50/50	viscous coupling	viscous coupling	viscous coupling

==== BM/BR Legacy/Outback ====
The 2010–2014 Legacy and Outback models offer a six-speed manual as one of the two transmission options in the base 2.5i and 2.5i Premium and is the only option for the Legacy GT model. This transmission is an evolution of the 5MT split-case design, and does not share any parts with the STI's 6MT transmission. The transmission uses a cable shifter, unlike previous designs that use a direct mechanical linkage.

Gear Ratios:
Model	1st	2nd	3rd	4th	5th	6th	Reverse	Final Drive
Legacy 2.5 GT	3.454	1.947	1.296	0.972	0.780	0.666	3.636	4.111
Legacy 2.5 NA	3.454	1.947	1.296	0.972	0.825	0.695	3.636	4.111
Outback 2.5 NA	3.454	1.947	1.296	0.972	0.825	0.695	3.636	4.444

==== 2015 WRX ====
The 2015 WRX has a new 6-speed cable-shifted manual transmission behind the new FA20DIT boxer engine. This transmission uses a viscous limited slip center differential with a 50/50 torque split similar to the 5MT found in previous WRX's. Reverse is located to the right of 6th gear, and is accessed by lifting a lockout ring below the shift knob, similar to the STi 6MT.

Like the Legacy/Outback, the WRX 6MT is of a split-case design similar to the older 5MT and does not share any internal commonality with the WRX STi 6MT.

Gear Ratios:
Model	1st	2nd	3rd	4th	5th	6th	Reverse	Final Drive	Rear DIff	Transmission Code
2015-2017 WRX	3.454	1.947	1.296	0.972	0.780	0.666	3.636	4.111	Open	TY751VB9CA
2018-2020	3.454	1.947	1.296	0.972	0.780	0.666	3.636	4.44	Open	TY751VB6CA

==== Crosstrek (2018–2023) ====
The 2018–2023 Crosstrek featured a six-speed cable shifted manual transmission. It is similar in design to the six-speed transmission found in the 2010–2014 Outback. Subaru stopped offering the Crosstrek with a manual transmission starting with the 2024 model year. This transmission is desirable for its low first gear ratio and compatibility with older Subaru platforms, such as the 3rd generation Outback (2005–2009).

Gear Ratios:
Model	1st	2nd	3rd	4th	5th	6th	Final Drive	Rear DIff	Transmission Code
2018-2023 Crosstrek	3.818	1.947	1.296	1.029	0.825	0.738	4.444	Open	TY751VDJDA

== Sources ==
- Subaru of America main website
- "Subaru Transmission Specs". Archived from the original on 1 August 2008.
- 1977 Subaru Factory Service Manual
- 1983 Subaru Factory Service Manual
- 1984 Subaru Factory Service Manual
- 1979–2002 Subaru Owner's Manuals
- "Rallispec LTD. – Subaru Gearbox Chart". Sports Performance Drivers Association. Archived from the original on 24 February 2012.
- 2007 Sti info

( https://www.vdi-wissensforum.de. Enhanced performance of next generation LINEARTRONIC.

== See also ==
- List of Subaru engines
