= Subaru SVX =

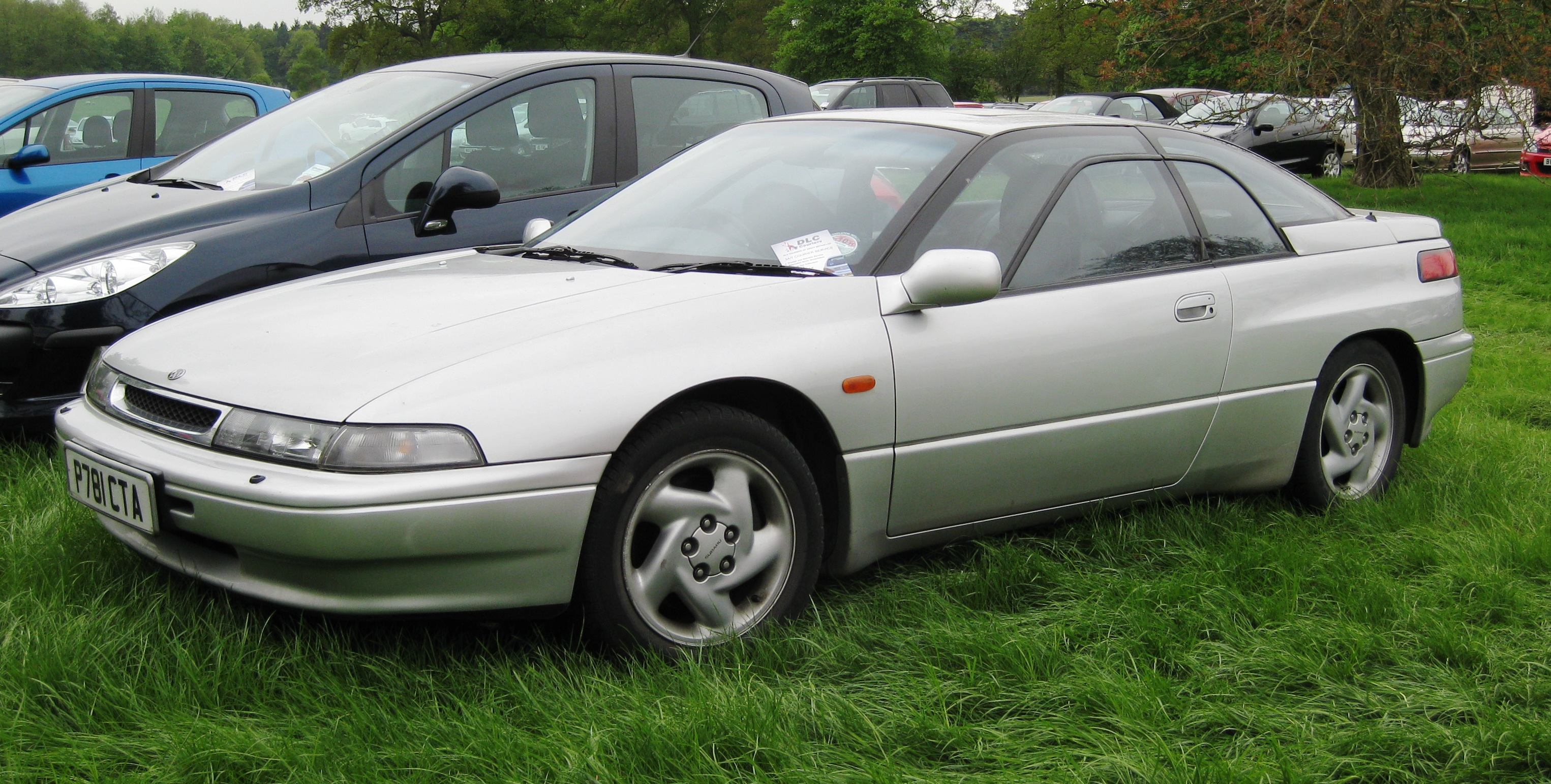

Overview
- Manufacturer: Subaru
- Also called: Subaru Alcyone SVX
- Production: 1991 – December 1996
- Assembly: Ōta North Plant, Ōta, Gunma, Japan
- Designer: Giorgetto Giugiaro at Italdesign

Body and chassis
- Class: Grand tourer
- Body style: 2-door coupé
- Layout: Front-engine, four-wheel drive Front-engine, front-wheel drive

Powertrain
- Engine: 3.3 L EG33 H6
- Transmission: 4-speed 4EAT automatic

Dimensions
- Wheelbase: 2,610 mm (102.8 in)
- Length: 4,625 mm (182.1 in)
- Width: 1,770 mm (69.7 in)
- Height: 1,310 mm (51.6 in)
- Curb weight: 1,590 kg (3,505 lb)

Chronology
- Predecessor: Subaru XT

The Subaru SVX, marketed in the Japanese home market as the Subaru Alcyone SVX, is a two-door, front-engine, all- or front-wheel drive coupé manufactured and marketed by Subaru from 1991 to 1996 over a single generation.

Superseding the company's aviation-influenced XT range, the SVX was Subaru's first entry into the luxury/performance market, and was noted for its aircraft-inspired 'window-within-a-window' side-glass configuration.

The nameplate "Alcyone" (pronounced "al-SIGH-uh-nee") refers to the brightest star in the Pleiades constellation, stylized in the Subaru company logo. The suffix "SVX" is an acronym for "Subaru Vehicle X".

== Development ==
The Subaru Alcyone SVX debuted as a concept at the 1989 Tokyo Auto Show with styling by noted Italian designer Giorgetto Giugiaro of ItalDesign. The SVX entered production, retaining its window-within-a-window configuration, adapted from the previous generation Subaru Alcyone/XT with an additional extension of glass covering the A-pillar — which Subaru described as an "aircraft-inspired glass-to-glass canopy."

In contrast to the angular XT, the SVX featured softer lines with its two-piece power side windows. Each side window featured an operable section roughly two-thirds of the entire windows size, with the division parallel to the upper curve of the door frame. The SVX featured a drag coefficient of Cd=0.29, identical to that of the XT coupe it replaced. European market cars had a slightly lower wind resistance of Cd=0.285, thanks to a larger undertray.

From 1991 to 1992, Subaru displayed the Amadeus, a prototype shooting brake variation on the SVX, in both two- and four-door versions, which was considered for production. Ultimately the Amadeus was not produced.

== Powertrain ==
The SVX debuted with and remained available with only one engine, the EG33 model 3.3-liter boxer horizontally opposed flat-six. This engine was the largest engine produced by Subaru for its passenger cars until the introduction of the 3.6-liter EZ36 engine in the 2008 Subaru Tribeca. The previous generation Subaru Alcyone had a turbocharged four-cylinder engine, but the larger EG33 was more powerful and so a turbo was not installed.

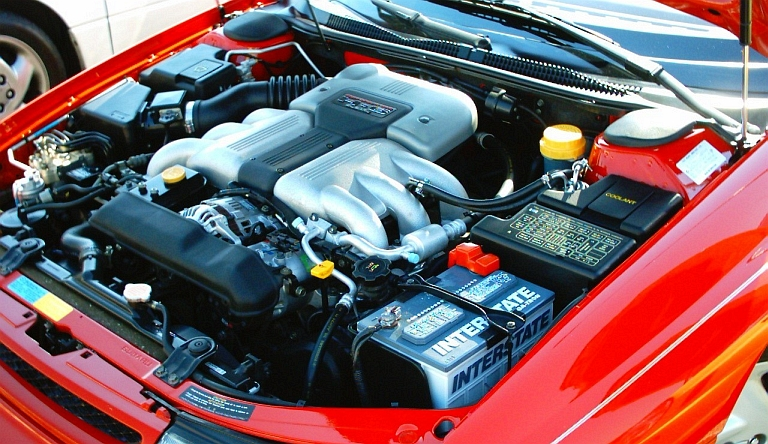
EG33, quad cam, 24 valve engine

Internally, the engine is essentially a six-cylinder variant of the EJ22 found in the first-generation Japanese market Legacy and Impreza. The new 3.3-liter variant was equipped with DOHC and four valves per cylinder, and had an increased compression ratio of 10.1:1, bringing power up to 172 kilowatts (231 hp) at 5,400 rpm with 309 newton-metres (228 lb⋅ft) of torque at 4,400 rpm. Fuel delivery was accomplished with sequential multi-port fuel injection with dual-spray injectors. Engine ignition used platinum spark plugs and a computerized management system with "limp home feature", which included over-rev protection, as well as monitors for fuel injection and ignition.

The exhaust system consisted of head pipes from each bank of cylinders with their own pre-catalytic converters, which entered a dual-inlet / single outlet main catalytic converter. A single 2.5-inch (64 mm) exhaust pipe exited the main converter and went into a resonator, and onto the main, transverse, single-inlet muffler with twin exhaust tips in the bumper.

The SVX was offered solely with an automatic transmissions, as Subaru did not offer a manual transmission capable of handling the horsepower and torque of the EG33 engine at the time. Subaru offered two all-wheel drive systems for the automatic transmission, called ACT-4 or VTD. The first system, called ACT-4 (active torque split) was introduced on the 1988.5 Alcyone using an electronic control unit to vary the torque applied to the rear wheels dynamically based on driving conditions. As an active system, it varied the torque split to the rear infinitely based on several inputs as a percentage of the torque available to the directly geared front wheels, never to exceed the theoretical "full lock" of 50% rear bias. This AWD system was used throughout the entire production run in vehicles manufactured for sale in the US. A more advanced system called VTD (variable torque distribution), was used on SVX for sale in Japan, Europe and Brazil. The VTD AWD system adds a planetary center differential. The system retains the use of the ACT clutch and active control, though its size and role are much smaller as it is used only to suppress differential action instead of the complete differential function. When no speed difference exists between front and rear, the entire VTD gear rotates as a unit and torque split is at a mechanical 36/64 biased by the planetary gear ratio. The clutch is incorporated to prevent and suppress any differential action that may occur as the planetary gear will send virtually all torque to the axle with the highest speed if not restrained. By using a similar logic to the previous ACT system, the clutch can theoretically direct any percentage of torque to either axle, but in practice the variation remains between 34 and 50% front and 64-50% rear. This system is not capable of operating in 2WD and therefore could not be used on 2WD dynos as required for emissions testing in some states. This prevented VTD as an option on Subaru vehicles offered for sale in US until passenger car regulations were changed, which occurred long after the end of svx production. It was later introduced to the US with the Outback VDC.

Problems with early SVX transmissions included a defective torque converter clutch which disintegrates and clogs early radiators (both clutch and radiator changed in 1993), and had systemic high clutch failures due to lower than spec pump pressure, fluid evacuation, and clutch balance pressure. Several major revisions were made, all of which are included by late 1994 production. Shortly after the SVX ended production Subaru transitioned to a completely redesigned 4 speed unit.

The Japanese-spec "SVX L" received four-wheel steering in 1991 and 1992 (model code "CXD" of which 1,905 were built). The VTD equipped versions received the "CXW" chassis code. In an attempt to lower the price for the US market, a front-wheel drive ("CXV") was offered in 1994 and 1995 but sales were less than stellar.

- 0-60 mph: 7.3 seconds
- 1/4 mile: 15.4 seconds at 92.5 mph (148.9 km/h)
- Top speed: 154 mph (248 km/h) (1992–93), 143 mph (230 km/h) (1994+ due to the addition of an electronic speed governor)
- 60-0 mph: 98 ft (30 m)

== Market ==
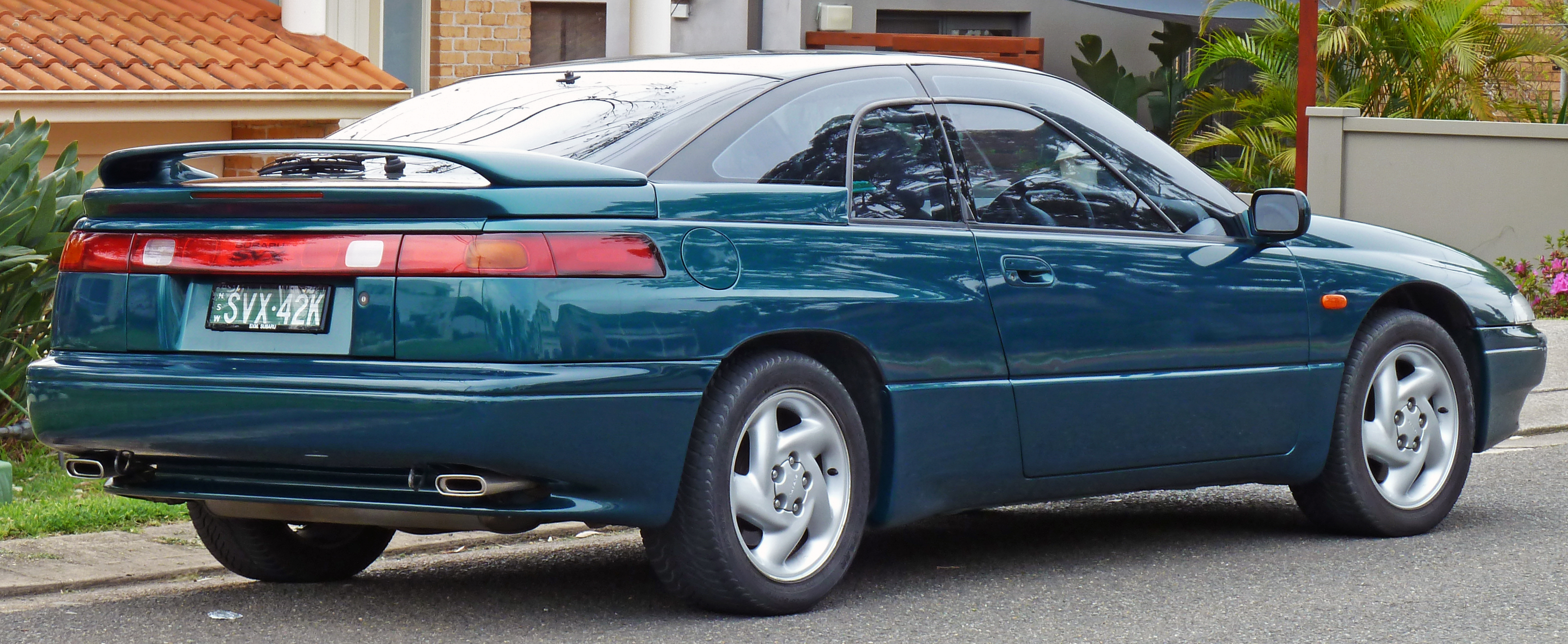
Rear view of the SVX (Australia; 1997)

Sales of the SVX reached 14,257 in the United States and a total of 24,379 worldwide. 2,478 SVXs were sold in Europe (of which 951 went to Switzerland, 854 to Germany, and 60 to France). Roughly 7,000 of all SVXs sold were right-hand drive models. Included in this number were the 249 vehicles sold in Australia, at a cost between approx. A$73,000 to A$83,000. 5,884 units remained in Japan.

The SVX was also developed and released during Japan's "bubble economy", and as the economic condition in Japan continued to decline, it had an effect on sales in Japan.

=== Asia ===
In Japan, the SVX was the first Subaru to exceed government dimension regulations with regards to the vehicles exterior measurements. The SVX also obligated Japanese buyers to pay more annual road tax which limited sales due to the engine displacement. The SVX was not Subaru's first car to be sold in Japan with an engine bigger than two litres; this honor goes to the preceding Alcyone XT6.

The models offered in Japan were the L (similar to the LSi in the US) and the S4. As a result, in Japan the SVX was considered a luxury vehicle and was equipped appropriately with one-touch climate control, leather interior, front seats that were both electrically adjustable and heated, a single-disc CD player coupled with a Panasonic AM/FM stereo system, that was hidden behind a retractable panel, and a remote-controlled infrared keyless entry with security system. Later S-Four badged versions had 250 PS (184 kW; 247 hp). Some later Japanese models also came with upgraded 16-inch forged diamond spoke BBS alloy wheels instead of the 16-inch 5-spoke wheels that was standard equipment that most SVX's came with.

Television advertising in Japan used Minako Yoshida singing "500 Miles", a reference to the car being able to travel 805 kilometres (500.2 mi) on one 70 litres (18 US gal) tank of fuel, with a fuel economy of 9.4 L/100 km (30 mpg_{‑imp}; 25 mpg_{‑US}).

=== North America ===
Subaru introduced the SVX in the United States in July 1991 (as a 1992 model), following the US debut with a Japanese market introduction in September of that same year. The model was designed and marketed as the replacement for the (Alcyone) XT and XT6 coupes. Outside Japan, the Alcyone designation was dropped, and the car was marketed as the Subaru SVX. The 1992 Subaru Legacy received a facelift inspired by the SVX. The introduction of the SVX followed the 1990 introduction of the Acura NSX and the 1980 introduction of the Isuzu Piazza.

The MSRP for the US base model 1992 SVX-L was $24,445, with the top-of-the-line model with touring package (leather trim, 8 way electronic seat adjustment, tilt and slide sunroof), the LS-L, listing at $28,000. This was $8,000–$11,000 higher than any previous Subaru. A rear spoiler was optional on the 1992 L and LS-L models and was included as standard equipment beginning in 1993. In 1992 only there was an XR model that included the rear spoiler as standard and was the only difference from the LS-L. However the spoiler put the model over the import weight limit so it was dropped after the first production run and the spoilers were shipped separately. By the end of its production run in 1996, the price had risen to $36,740 for the top-of-the-line LSi, which was the same trim level as the 1992 LS-L

A front-wheel drive version was offered on the SVX during the 1994–1995 model year, which cost about $5,300 less than the AWD version in 1994 and $1500 difference in 1995. In 1994, FWD was offered on both the base L model (X33 in the VIN) and on the mid-range LS model (X34 in the VIN) with the LSi only available with AWD. In 1995, only the base L model was offered in FWD (X33 in the 5th, 6th and 7th digits of the VIN) with AWD being optional for L and standard on LSi. The 1995 model year L FWD is so rare that many have never heard of or seen one, leading some experts to believe that extraordinarily few, or perhaps even none, were actually built that way, even if it was technically listed as available.

With Subaru forecasting sales of 10,000 each year, SVX sales reached 5,280 in 1992 and 3,859 cars in 1993. Production ended in December 1996, with sales continuing into 1997 — and 640 units sold in the final year.

In the United States, as well as a Canada, the automatic motorized shoulder belts (paired with a driver-side airbag) were equipped on the 1992-1993 models and the 1994 L models. The manual front seat belts (paired with dual front airbags) were equipped on the 1994-1997 LS and LSi models, and the 1995-1997 L models.

== Motorsports ==
In 1991, a Subaru SVX, driven by Ken Knight and Bob Dart, won the Alcan Winter Rally, a race starting in Seattle to the Arctic Circle and back.

In the early 1990s there was a Subaru SVX PPG Pace Car. It featured a silver to purple fade paint job, silver wheels in the front, purple wheels in the rear, "SVX" windshield banner, roll cage and an amber roof light. It was evaluated by Wally Dallenbach Sr, Indy Car Chief Steward and PPG Pace Car evaluator. It was used as a promotional tool for Subaru, as well as a pace car. While most pace cars were retired after one season, the SVX proved to be such a worthy example and a favorite, and was used for several seasons. It was in storage for many years in the "Subaru Performance Attic" in Cherry Hill, New Jersey near Subaru of America's new headquarters in Camden, New Jersey.

== Bibliography ==
- Mayersohn, Norman S. (1991), "Road & Track's Guide to the New Subaru SVX", Road & Track, archived from the original on 13 October 2007
