= Subaru XT =

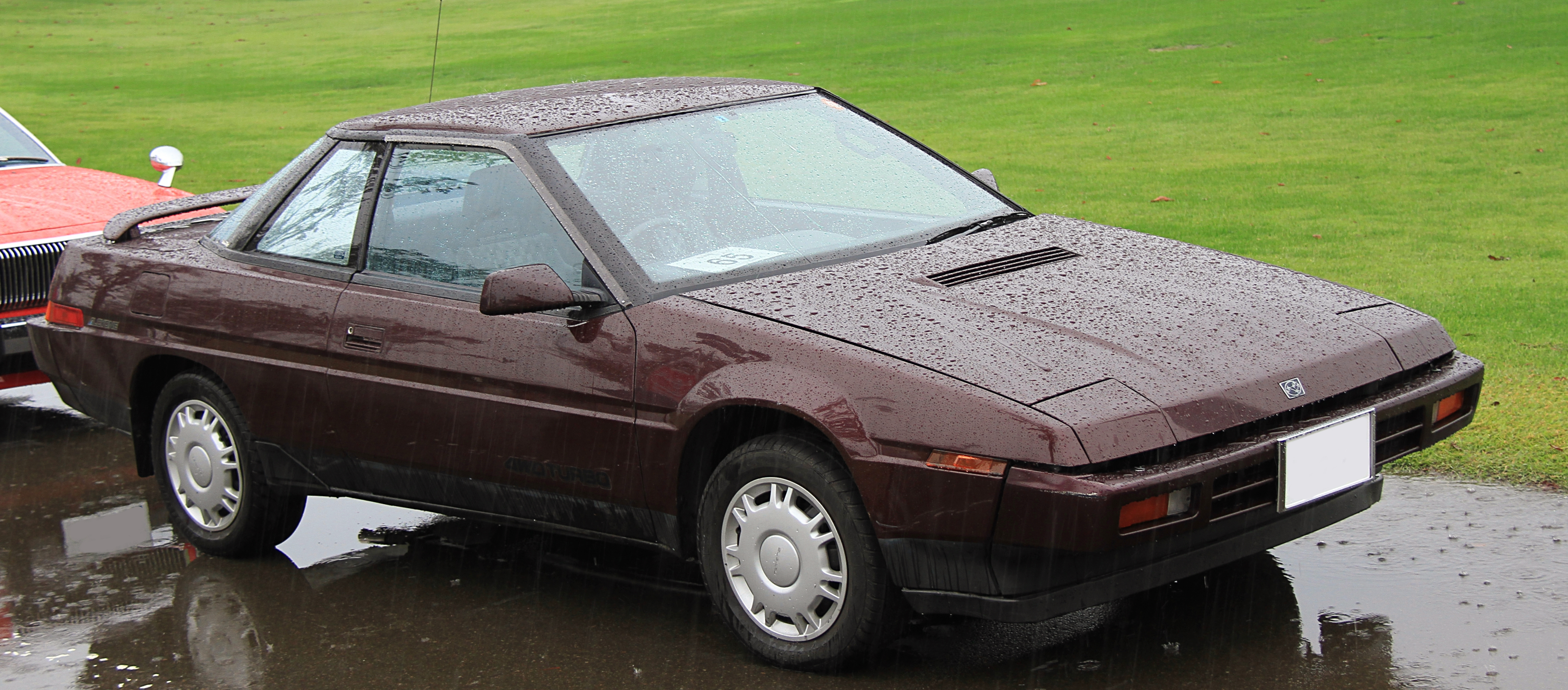

Overview
- Manufacturer: Subaru (Fuji Heavy Industries)
- Also called: Subaru Alcyone (Japan); Subaru Vortex (Australia & New Zealand)
- Production: 1985–1991
- Assembly: Yajima Plant, Ota, Gunma, Japan
- Designer: Tetsuya Hayashi, Kiyoshi Sugimoto, Hiroshi Yako (interior)

Body and chassis
- Class: Sports car
- Body style: 2-door coupé
- Layout: FF layout; F4 layout
- Related: Subaru Leone

Powertrain
- Engine: 1.8 L EA-82 H4; 2.7 L ER-27 H6
- Transmission: 3-speed automatic (Japan); 4-speed automatic; 5-speed manual

Dimensions
- Wheelbase: 2,464 mm (97 in)
- Length: 4,511 mm (177.6 in)
- Width: 1,689 mm (66.5 in)
- Height: 1,336 mm (52.6 in)

Chronology
- Successor: Subaru SVX

The Subaru XT is a 2+2 car manufactured and marketed by Subaru from 1985 to 1991, with a facelift in 1987. It is a two-door coupé with a front-mounted engine and either front-wheel drive or all-wheel drive. When the XT debuted, it was the most aerodynamic car in the US market.

Marketed as the Alcyone in Japan; as the Vortex in Australia and New Zealand; and as the XT (with the EA-82 four-cylinder engine) or XT6 (with the ER-27 six-cylinder engine) in North America and Europe, all XT cars were assembled at Subaru's Yajima Plant in Ota, Japan. Over its single generation, production reached just over 98,000.

The XT was conceived in the United States for the US market, and thus debuted globally in the US. After sales began in February 1985 in the US, the XT Turbo 4WD debuted in Europe at the March 1985 Geneva Motor Show, followed by its Japanese debut in June 1985.

The XT was noted for its pronounced wedge shape, low coefficient of drag; aviation influences from the aircraft division of parent company Fuji Heavy Industry; and its host of features, either innovative or uncommon in the XT's class — including height-adjustable pneumatic suspension, digital dash, central locking system, op-art upholstery, fold down rear seat, pod- and center console-mounted HVAC controls, advanced trip computer, and instrument cluster which tilted with adjustment of the steering column. With available front-wheel drive or four-wheel drive, depending on the model year, the XT offered three trim levels, DL, GL (non-turbo, front-drive only), and GL-10 Turbo.

The name referred to the star Alcyone, the brightest in the Pleiades star cluster, which is the basis for the Subaru logo. The model was succeeded by the Subaru Alcyone SVX in 1992.

== Design ==
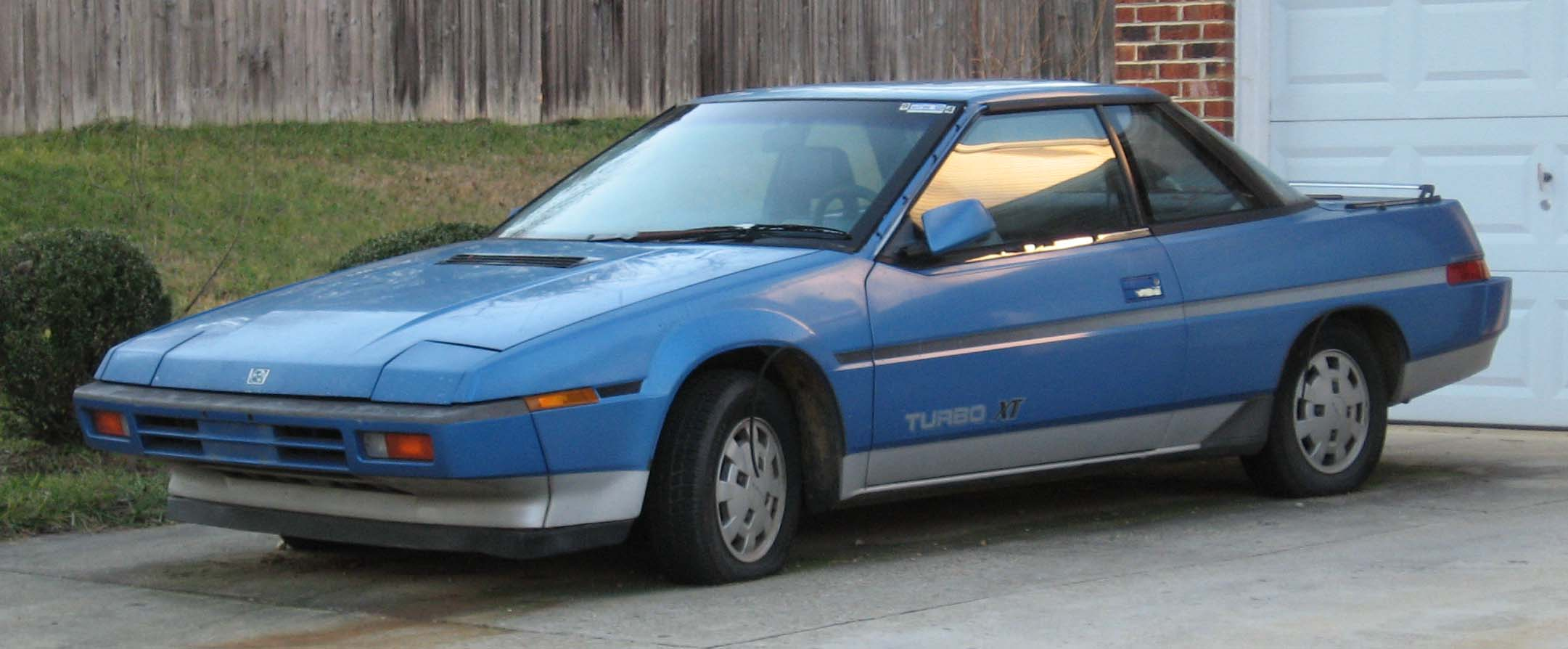
Subaru XT Turbo (USA)

The XT featured a pronounced wedge shape, sharing a common "folded paper" design approach with the Type AA Subaru Leone. When introduced, the New York Times called it "the ultimate in jazzy design", in contrast to Subaru's other offerings. Though derived from earlier Subarus, it was less overtly practical or commodious. The 2.7-litre flat-six engine exceeded 2000 cc in the Japanese Domestic Market, thereby exceeding government engine displacement regulations, and incurring higher annual road tax.

The XT's exterior design team was led by Kiyoshi Sugimoto, with the interior team led by Hiroshi Yako, under the guidance of Tetsuya Hayashi. Some sources credit Kyuchi Akari with the final design, with notable inspiration from American designer Alex Tremulis, who had instructed Akari in aerodynamic principles and noted areas of possible flow separation.

=== Aerodynamics ===
Subaru's trademark boxer engine with its flat, horizontally opposed cylinder configuration, enabled the bodywork's pronounced wedge shape, and extensive wind tunnel testing further lowered the XT's coefficient of drag. Pop-up headlights contributed to the wedge shape, and retractable button-like flaps allowed opening the door while keeping the handles flush with their adjacent bodywork. The XT used a single 22 inch windshield wiper which tucked under the hood when not in use, and rubber spoilers ahead of each wheel opening settled the airflow past the tires and wheels, while doubling as "mud guards." The result was the most aerodynamic production car sold in America at the time of its release with a coefficient of drag of 0.29, improved fuel economy, and a quieter ride due to reduced wind noise.

=== Features ===
The XT's interior used numerous aviation-like features, reflecting influences from the aircraft division of Subaru's parent company, Fuji Heavy Industries. The instruments featured pod-mounted controls for lighting, HVAC and wipers. The instrument panel moved with the standard tilt-telescope steering to keep the instruments oriented to the driver, recalling the same feature on the Isuzu Piazza and the Ford Probe introduced earlier in the 1980s and the Porsche 928 in the late 1970s. The joystick-shaped shifter integrated a thumb trigger interlock for the "on-demand" four-wheel drive. Turbo models featured a quasi-artificial horizon orange backlit liquid crystal instrument display with the tachometer, boost indicator, temperature and fuel gauges seen as three-dimensional graphs oriented to the quasi-horizon.

The XT featured a turbocharger, computer-controlled engine and transmission, adjustable height suspension and an optional digital instrument cluster. The pneumatic with height control recalled the use of Hydropneumatic suspension by Citroën, and Mercedes-Benz. Other uncommon features included an electronic in-dash trip computer, headlight washers (XT6 only), alloy wheels featuring an inset rectangular shape, pass-through folding rear seats, sporty front bucket seats and available push-button four-wheel drive (later changed to all-wheel drive).

The XT featured a speed alarm at 55mph, that could be activated with a separate key.

== 1985–1987 (Pre-facelift) ==
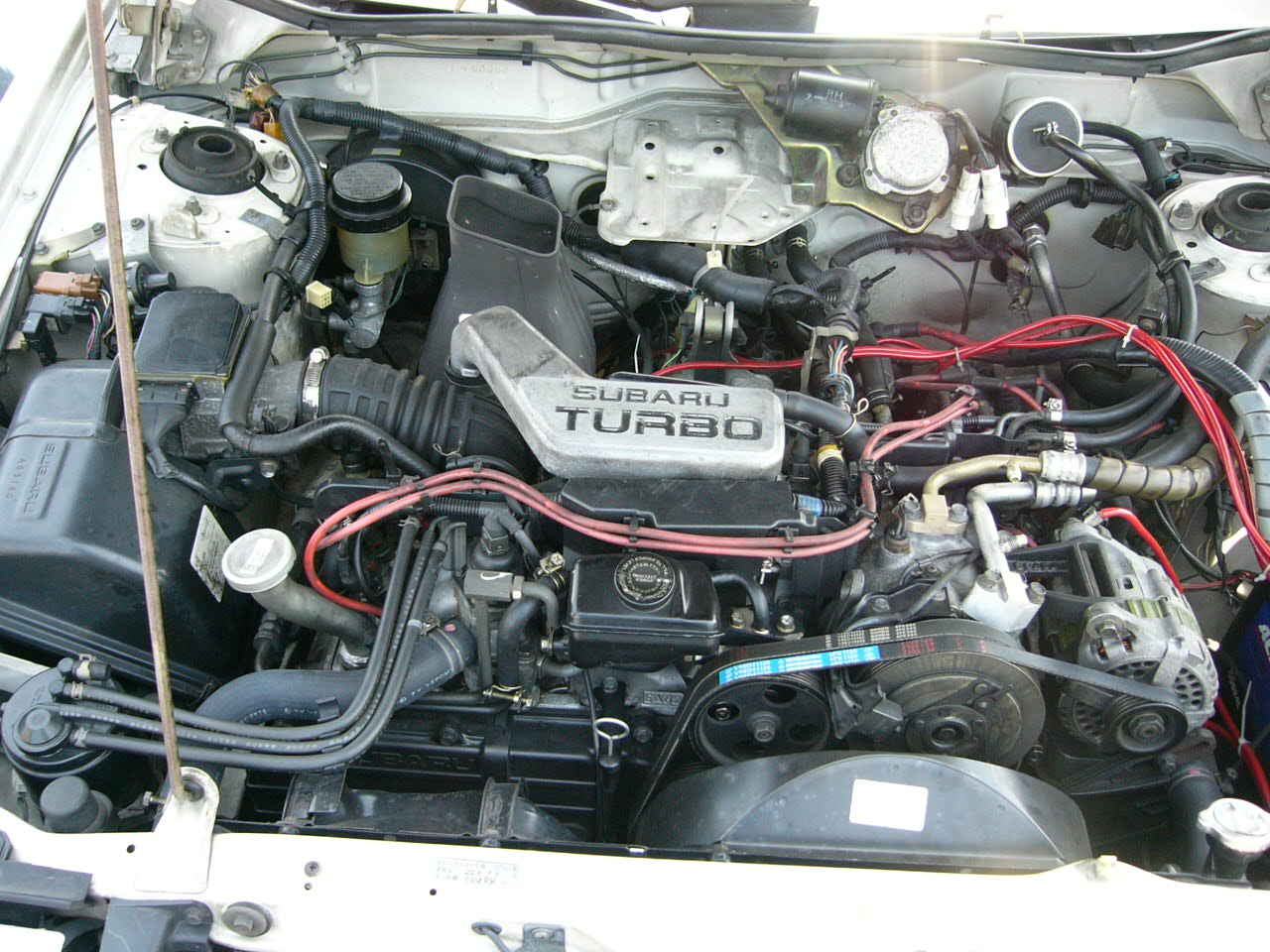
Subaru XT EA82T

The XT was launched initially as the XT in North America, Alcyone in Japan and Vortex in Australia and New Zealand. The pre-facelift XT was only powered by an H4 and was produced from 1985 to 1987.

=== Drivetrain ===
The 1985 XT was fitted with one of two engines for the US market:

- EA-82: 1781 cc H4 producing 97 hp (72 kW) at 5200 rpm and 103 lb⋅ft (140 N⋅m) at 3200 rpm (9.5:1 compression ratio).
- EA-82T: 1781 cc turbocharged H4 producing 112 hp (84 kW) at 4800 rpm and 143 lb⋅ft (194 N⋅m) at 2800 rpm (7.5:1 compression ratio; some sources say 7.7:1.) in North American specifications. In Europe the power of the XT Turbo was 136 PS (134 hp; 100 kW) at 5600 rpm and 197 N⋅m (145 ft⋅lb) at 2800 rpm; the naturally aspirated model was not sold there. Starting in 1987, power for North American cars increased to 115 hp (86 kW).

These engines shared the following equipment and specifications:

- 1,781 cc (109 cu in) displacement (92×67mm/3.62×2.63")
- Multi-port fuel injection
- Single overhead camshafts

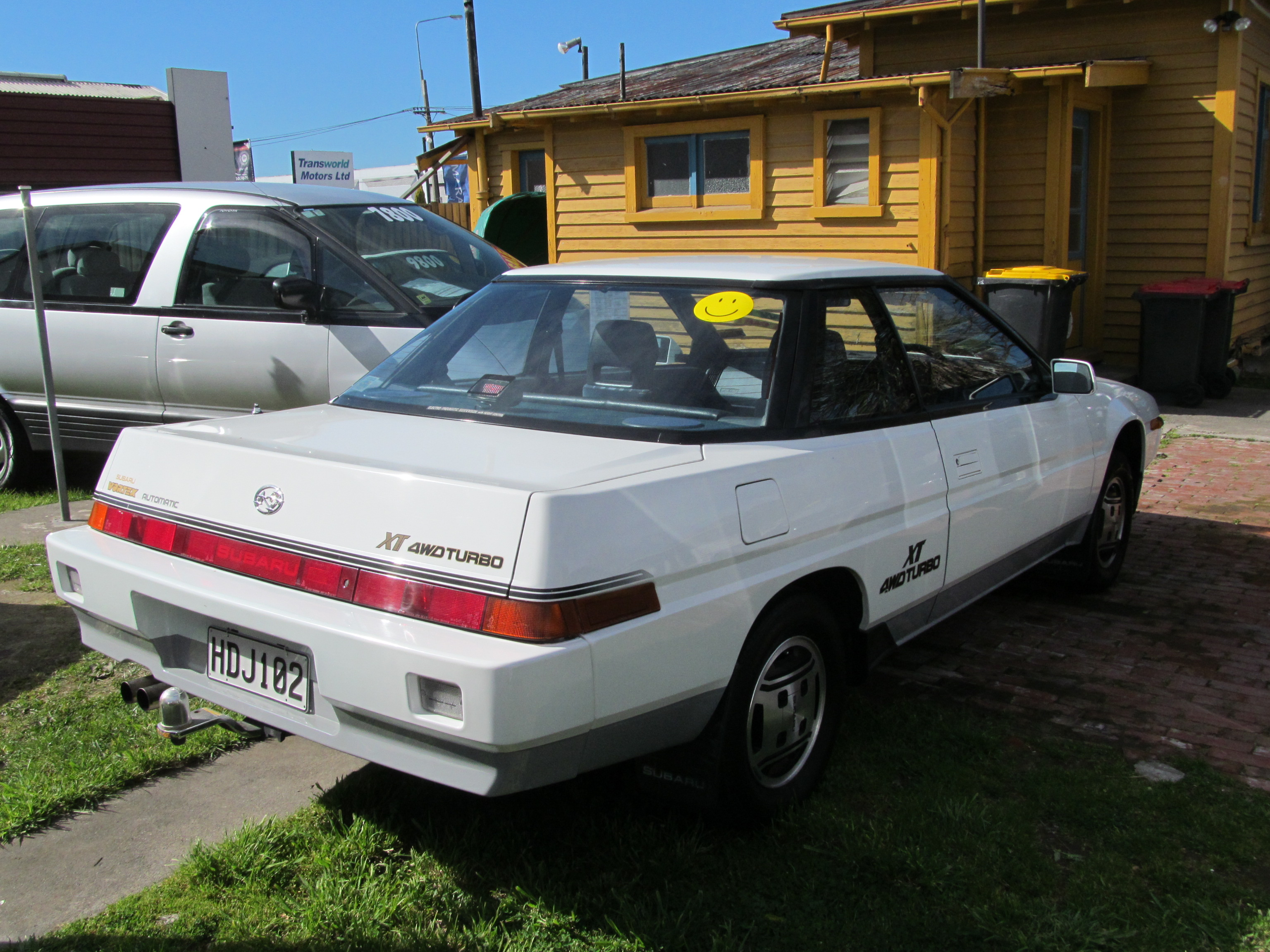
Subaru Vortex Turbo (New Zealand)

The XT was available with both manual and automatic transmissions. 85-87 XT Turbos were available as either front-wheel drive or part-time four-wheel drive, while the 85-87 XT non turbo cars were only available as front-wheel-drive. The part-time four-wheel-drive system, titled "On-Demand", was selectable by a push button atop the shifter.

=== Markets ===
Like other Subaru models of the same vintage, the North American market XT was sold in four models: the base-model XT DL, the better-equipped XT GL, the top-of-the-range FWD XT GL-10 Turbo and 4WD XT GL-10 Turbo-Traction. Many of the options mentioned above were available only on the GL-10 models.

In Japan it was only available as 2 turbocharged models: the Alcyone 4WD VR Turbo, and the Alcyone FF VS Turbo.

Australia and New Zealand also got 2 models, the turbocharged Vortex Turbo and the non-turbocharged Vortex XT. Initially the Vortex was only available as the non-turbocharged manual Vortex XT, but the turbo version and automatic gearbox came the following year.

European markets generally only received the XT Turbo and the XT Turbo 4WD (XT Turbo Allrad in Germany), where the car was sold in small numbers as a halo model.

=== Models ===
Model Name	Engine	Transmission	Drivetrain	Market
XT Coupe DL	EA-82 1781 cc H4	5-sp. M/T	FWD	USDM
XT Coupe GL	EA-82 1781 cc H4	5-sp. M/T 3-sp. A/T	FWD	USDM
XT Coupe GL-10 Turbo	EA-82T 1781 cc turbocharged H4	5-sp. M/T 3-sp. A/T	FWD	USDM
XT Coupe GL-10 Turbo-Traction	EA-82T 1781 cc turbocharged H4	5-sp. M/T 3-sp. A/T	"On-Demand" 4WD	USDM
Alcyone FF VS Turbo	EA-82T 1781 cc turbocharged H4	5-sp. M/T 3-sp. A/T	FWD	JDM
Alcyone 4WD VR Turbo	EA-82T 1781 cc turbocharged H4	5-sp. M/T 3-sp. A/T	"On-Demand" 4WD	JDM
XT Turbo	EA-82T 1781 cc turbocharged H4	5-sp. M/T	FWD	EUDM
XT 4WD Turbo	EA-82T 1781 cc turbocharged H4	5-sp. M/T 3-sp. A/T	"On-Demand" 4WD	EUDM
Vortex XT	EA-82 1781 cc H4	5-sp. M/T	FWD	ANZDM
Vortex XT 4WD Turbo	EA-82T 1781 cc turbocharged H4	5-sp. M/T 3-sp. A/T	"On-Demand" 4WD	ANZDM

== 1987–1991 (Facelift & XT6) ==
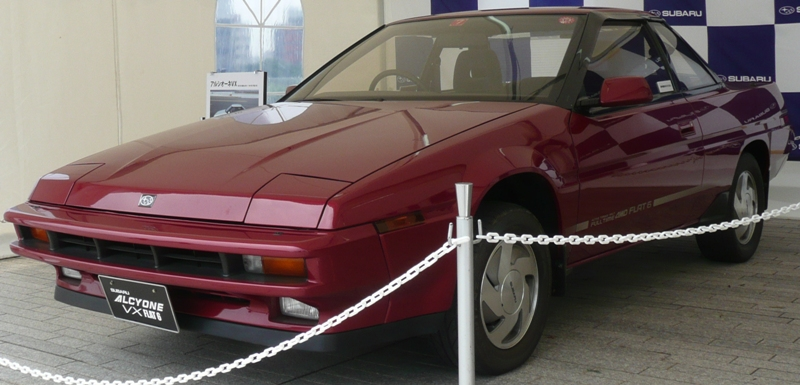
Subaru Alcyone VX

The XT received a minor update in 1987 for the second half of the 1987 model year roughly corresponding to the 1988 launch of the XT6, a new 6 cylinder model. Where earlier models featured bumper-mounted reverse lights, 1987 1/2-up models had the reverse lights in the center taillight panel. The front and rear bumpers were also redesigned. In Japan, the original bumpers were used for the VS and VR while the VX received the new facelift. In the US, all new models received the facelifted bumpers.

All wheel drive turbo and six-cylinder models were distinguished by their headrests; base models had solid headrests, where the turbo AWD and six-cylinder models had a large rectangular hole through the center.

=== Drivetrain ===
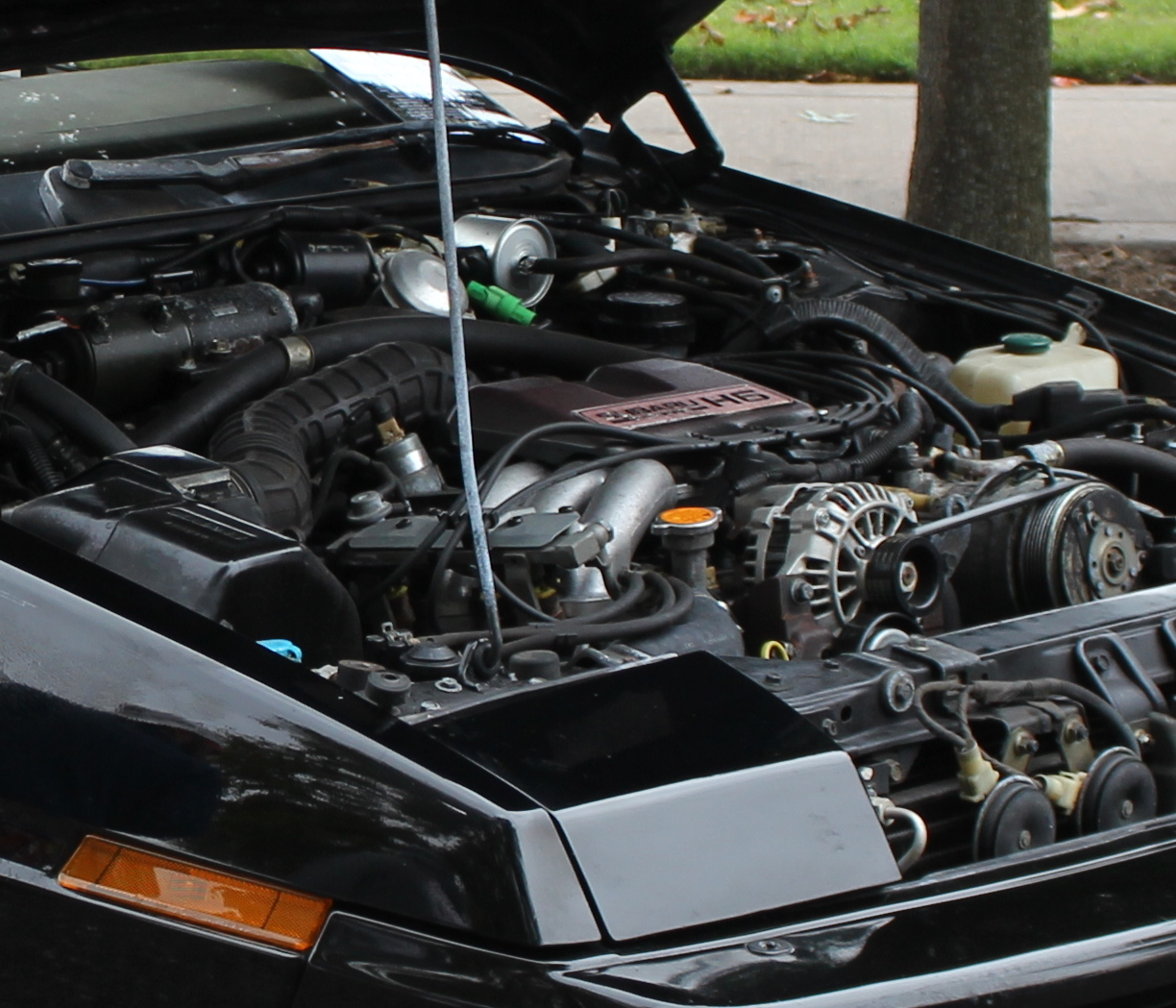
Subaru XT6 ER-27

The 1987 XT was fitted with one of 3 engines

- EA-82: 1781 cc H4 producing 97 hp (72 kW) at 5200 rpm and 103 ft·lbf (140 Nm) at 3200 rpm (9.5:1 compression ratio).
- EA-82T: 1781 cc turbocharged H4 producing 115 hp (86 kW) at 4800 rpm and 143 ft·lbf (194 Nm) at 2800 rpm (7.5:1 compression ratio; some sources say 7.7:1.).
- ER-27: 2672 cc H6 producing 145 hp (108 kW; 147 PS) at 5,200 rpm and 156 ft⋅lb (212 N⋅m) at 4,000 rpm.

6 cylinder models were fitted with stiffer suspension to compensate for the new heavier engine.

=== Markets ===
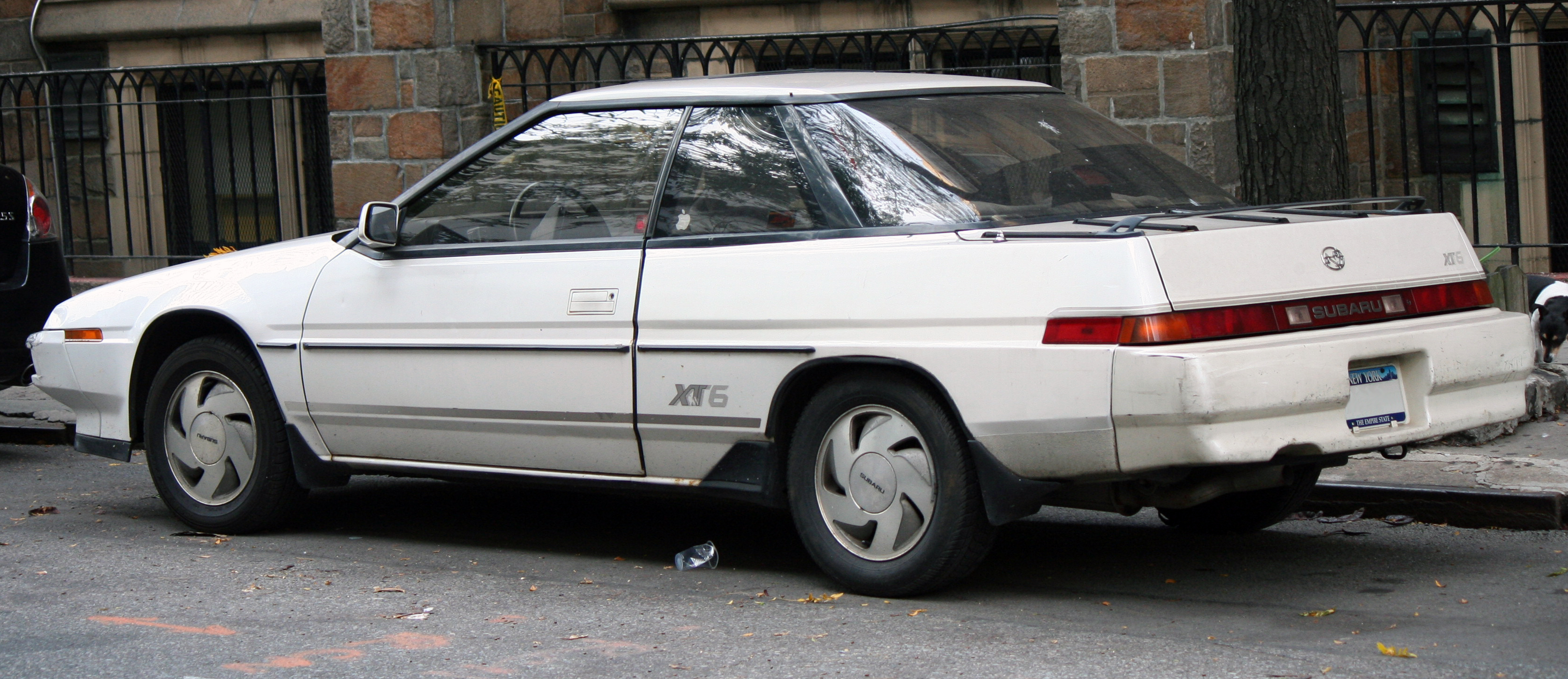
Subaru XT6

In North America the updated XT was sold in 2 models: The base 4 cylinder model GL, and the new 6 cylinder model XT6. The turbo models were dropped from the North American market after the update.

In Japan, the updated XT was sold in 3 models: The turbocharged FWD VS, the turbocharged 4WD VR, and the new 6 cylinder 4WD Alcyone VX.

In New Zealand, the new 6 cylinder model was marketed as the Vortex ZZ6. However, few were sold due to New Zealand's fuel options, which were 91 octane unleaded fuel or 96 octane leaded fuel. The ER27 required 96 octane unleaded petrol. Today, there are only two NZ new 6 cylinder Vortexes registered according to NZTA fleet data.

In Japan, the part-time 4WD system was replaced entirely by the new full-time 4WD system. In the US, the XT6 was available in either FWD or with the new full-time 4WD system while the XT GL was available with either FWD or the old "On-Demand" 4WD.

=== Features and options ===
The XT6 was fitted with a unique Cybrid adaptive electrohydraulic steering system that changed the level of assistance based on the vehicle's speed. This system did not use a conventional belt-driven power steering pump, freeing up much-needed space in the XT6's already cramped engine bay. The Cybrid system also uses hydraulic fluid that is incompatible with conventional power steering fluid (which is usually automatic transmission fluid). This fluid is still available directly from Subaru at a significant premium over more common types of hydraulic fluid.

The XT6 has two electric fans to also help performance, compared to one electric fan and one belt driven fan on all other XTs. With these changes, the XT6 was given a higher amp alternator.

The XT6 was not available with the digital instrument cluster of the turbo XT models.

=== Special editions ===
A special "30th Anniversary" version of the Alcyone VX was produced in 1988, limited to 30 units. This version had a white and gold paint job with "30th Anniversary" side decals and a red interior.

2 prototype versions of the Alcyone VX were made in Japan for the 27th Tokyo Motor Show. The "Junko Shimada" was one that included a full black paintjob with black smooth wheel caps and a bright red leather interior, designed by Japanese fashion designer, Junko Shimada. The other was the "FICCE Special" which was a convertible version of the Alcyone with special hubcaps and interior graphics designed by Yoshiyuki Konishi. The FICCE is allegedly sitting in the Ibaraki Prefecture in need of restoration.

=== Models ===
Model Name	Engine	Transmission	Drivetrain	Market
XT GL	EA-82 1781 cc H4	5-sp. M/T 4-sp. A/T	FWD Part-time 4WD Full-time 4WD	USDM
XT6	ER-27 2672 cc H6	5-sp. M/T 4-sp. A/T	FWD Full-time 4WD	USDM
Alcyone VS	EA-82T 1781 cc turbocharged H4	5-sp. M/T 4-sp. A/T	FWD	JDM
Alcyone VR	EA-82T 1781 cc turbocharged H4	5-sp. M/T 4-sp. A/T	Full-time 4WD	JDM
Alcyone VX	ER-27 2672 cc H6	4-sp. A/T	Full-time 4WD	JDM
XT Turbo	EA-82T 1781 cc turbocharged H4	5-sp. M/T 4-sp. A/T	Full-time 4WD	EUDM
Vortex XT	EA-82 1781 cc H4	5-sp. M/T 4-sp. A/T	FWD	ANZDM
Vortex ZZ6	ER-27 2672 cc H6	4-sp. A/T	Full-time 4WD	ANZDM

== Market appeal and production ==
Overall production of the XT remained low throughout its lifespan. Although the fuel crisis of the late 1970s and ever-tightening emissions regulations had severely limited power figures from all manufacturers in the mid 1980s, the XT's paltry 134 hp (100 kW) wasn't enough to attract serious attention from the automotive racing crowd. One of Subaru's ads from the 1980s read, The kind of car Mercedes might have built if they were a little more frugal and a lot more inventive. The car's extra features, which certainly had some novelty appeal, were uncharacteristic of this class of car and may not have contributed much to the XT's sales. In the 1980s, consumers with surplus cash in search of a better-equipped vehicle did not generally start shopping at Subaru.

Subaru produced 98,918 XTs, XT6s, and Alcyone's. Surprisingly, only 8,170 of these were sold in the Japanese market.

While the XT was an interesting design exercise, it did little to grow Subaru's sales. The company has seen much more widespread success in the significantly more mainstream Legacy, Legacy Outback and Impreza WRX models introduced in recent years.

The Subaru XT Turbo was the official car for the Most Valuable Player for Super Bowl XXII presented by SPORT magazine in 1988, eventually won by Washington Redskins quarterback Doug Williams, and The Subaru XT6 was the official car for the Most Valuable Player for Super Bowl XXIII in 1989, eventually won by San Francisco 49ers wide receiver Jerry Rice.

== Motorsports ==
The XT was almost never officially used for racing. One exception is the 1985 Wynn's Safari Australia where one XT competed, however it received damage and was not able to finish.
