= Subaru Impreza (second generation) =

Second generation of Subaru Impreza

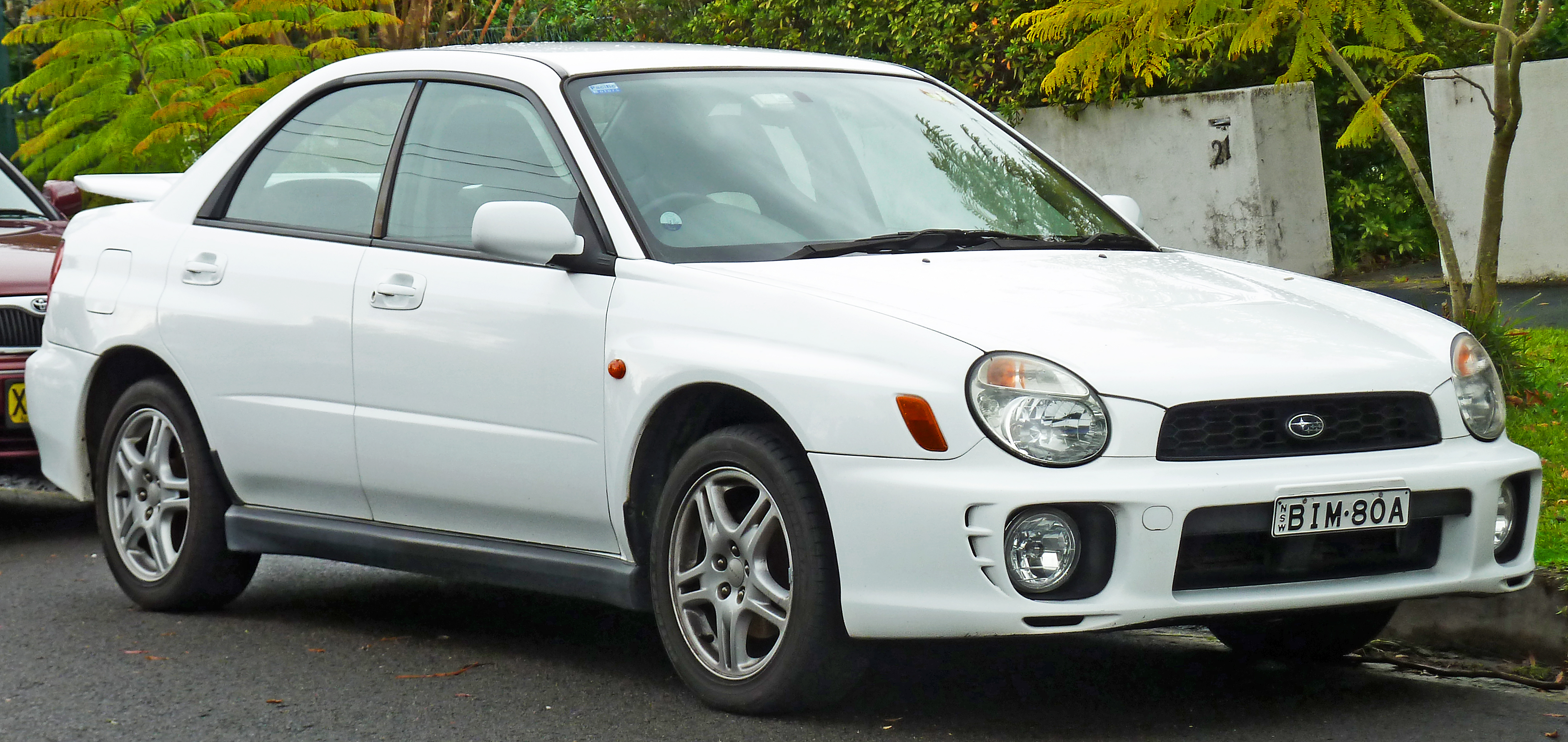

Overview
- Manufacturer: Subaru (Fuji Heavy Industries); Saab (Saab 9-2X)
- Model code: GG
- Also called: Subaru Outback Sport; Saab 9-2X
- Production: 2000–2007 (Japan); 2001–2007 (North America)
- Model years: 2001–2007; 2002–2007 (North America)
- Assembly: Japan: Ōta, Gunma; Sweden: Trollhättan (Trollhättan Assembly), Saab 9-2X only
- Designer: Hidefumi Kato (1998); Peter Stevens (2001) (2003 Facelift); Andreas Zapatinas (2004) (2005 Facelift)

Body and chassis
- Class: Compact
- Body style: 4-door sedan (GD); 5-door wagon (GG)
- Layout: Front-engine, all-wheel drive

Powertrain
- Engine: 1.5 L EJ15 F4; 1.5 L EL15 F4; 1.6 L EJ16 F4; 2.0 L EJ20 F4; 2.0 L EJ20 F4 (Turbo); 2.5 L EJ25 F4; 2.5 L EJ25 F4 (Turbo)
- Transmission: 4-speed automatic 5-speed manual 6-speed manual (STI)

Dimensions
- Wheelbase: 2,525 mm (99.4 in)
- Length: 4,415 mm (173.8 in)
- Width: Sedan: 1,730 mm (68.1 in); Hatchback: 1,695 mm (66.7 in)
- Height: 1,425 mm (56.1 in)
- Curb weight: 1,360 kg (2,998.3 lb)

Chronology
- Predecessor: Subaru Impreza (first generation)
- Successor: Subaru Impreza (third generation); Subaru Levorg (Station Wagon models)

The second generation of the Subaru Impreza compact car was introduced in 2000 and manufactured up to 2007 by Subaru in Ōta, Gunma, Japan, in both sedan (GD series) and five-door Hatchback (GG series) bodystyles, as well as two intermediate facelifts throughout its lifespan.

The Impreza received naturally aspirated 1.5, 1.6, 2.0, or 2.5 liter flat-four engines, with the performance oriented WRX and WRX STI models upgraded to turbocharged versions of the two latter options. Export models typically received all-wheel drive, with front-wheel drive also available in the Japanese domestic market.

== History ==
=== Pre-facelift (“Bug-eye”): 2000–2002 ===
Built on a significantly modified version of the first generation platform, the new Impreza followed much the same formula as its predecessor, including a similarly contoured silhouette. Despite this, the front-end styling—distinguished by ovoid headlamps—attracted significant controversy. This version of the Impreza has gained the nickname 'Bug Eye' among Subaru enthusiasts. Body dimensions for the sedan increased by 45 mm (1.8 in) in length, 40 mm (1.6 in) in width, and 25 mm (1.0 in) in height; wheelbase increased by 5 mm (0.2 in). To satisfy Japanese vehicle size tax regulations, the width of the hatchback increased by just 5 mm (0.2 in) to 1,695 mm (66.7 in) and therefore remaining in the limit "5" classification. As Subaru had intended to homologate the sedan chassis for rallying, the decision to increase the width of the sedan—which placed it into the higher taxed number "3" division—brought added stability. Likewise, the 20 mm (0.8 in) increase in track for the sedan also worked to aid handling, with the hatchback gaining just 5 mm (0.2 in). Other main improvements to the chassis included a 120 percent increase in torsional rigidity; mainly due to revisions in front subframe design. The suspension retained its basic MacPherson strut in the front and rear, although Subaru altered the geometry.

The GD chassis gains nearly 200 kg (441 lb) in weight over the GC chassis. Subaru claims that compared to the previous model, the GD chassis is 148 percent and 82 percent stiffer in torsional and beam rigidity, respectively. This stiffness is primarily due to the addition of a steel "ring" which encircles the cabin at the B-pillar. While the stiffness was increased for passenger safety, it has the added benefit of providing more stability for motorsports events. Firehouse magazine notes that the Jaws of Life need to cut the Subaru's B-pillars at certain points in order to cut through the car frame. In terms of safety, the GD chassis scored much higher than the GC chassis and earned a "Good" rating (highest mark) from the IIHS's offset crash test. 4 stars front driver, 5-star front passenger and 4-star side safety ratings from the NHTSA.

In Subaru's home market of Japan, the Impreza range started with the 1.5i—powered by the 1.5-liter EJ15 SOHC engine and paired with a manual transmission or optional automatic. Subaru fitted a DOHC version of the same engine to the automatic-only 1.5R, which also featured an active valve control system. For both models, front- and all-wheel drive versions were available. Starting from 2006, Subaru phased out the EJ15 engine in favour of the new EL15.

In Greece a turbocharged version of the 1.6 liter version was also offered. In addition to the turbo, it received new mapping, new fuel injectors, new pistons, a dual exhaust, and a mid-sized spoiler. This engine makes 180 PS (132 kW; 178 hp).

Subaru released this generation of Impreza to North America in 2001 for the 2002 model year. The release of the 169 kW (230 PS; 227 bhp) 2.0-liter turbocharged Impreza WRX, did not occur until the 2002 model year, and the Impreza WRX STI was delayed until the 2004 model year. The US version of the STI includes various departures from the Japanese and European counterparts, such as a turbocharged 2.5-liter EJ257 engine, rather than the twin scroll turbo 2.0 L engine sold elsewhere. All 2006 American Imprezas use some form of the 2.5-liter EJ25 engine since naturally aspirated and turbocharged are available.

The Outback Sport was sold in Australia for model years 2001–2007, but it was renamed as the Impreza RV with the same color scheme as the American version. The Australian version had a dual-range manual transmission, not available in the United States. The Impreza was Wheels magazine's Car of the Year for 2000.

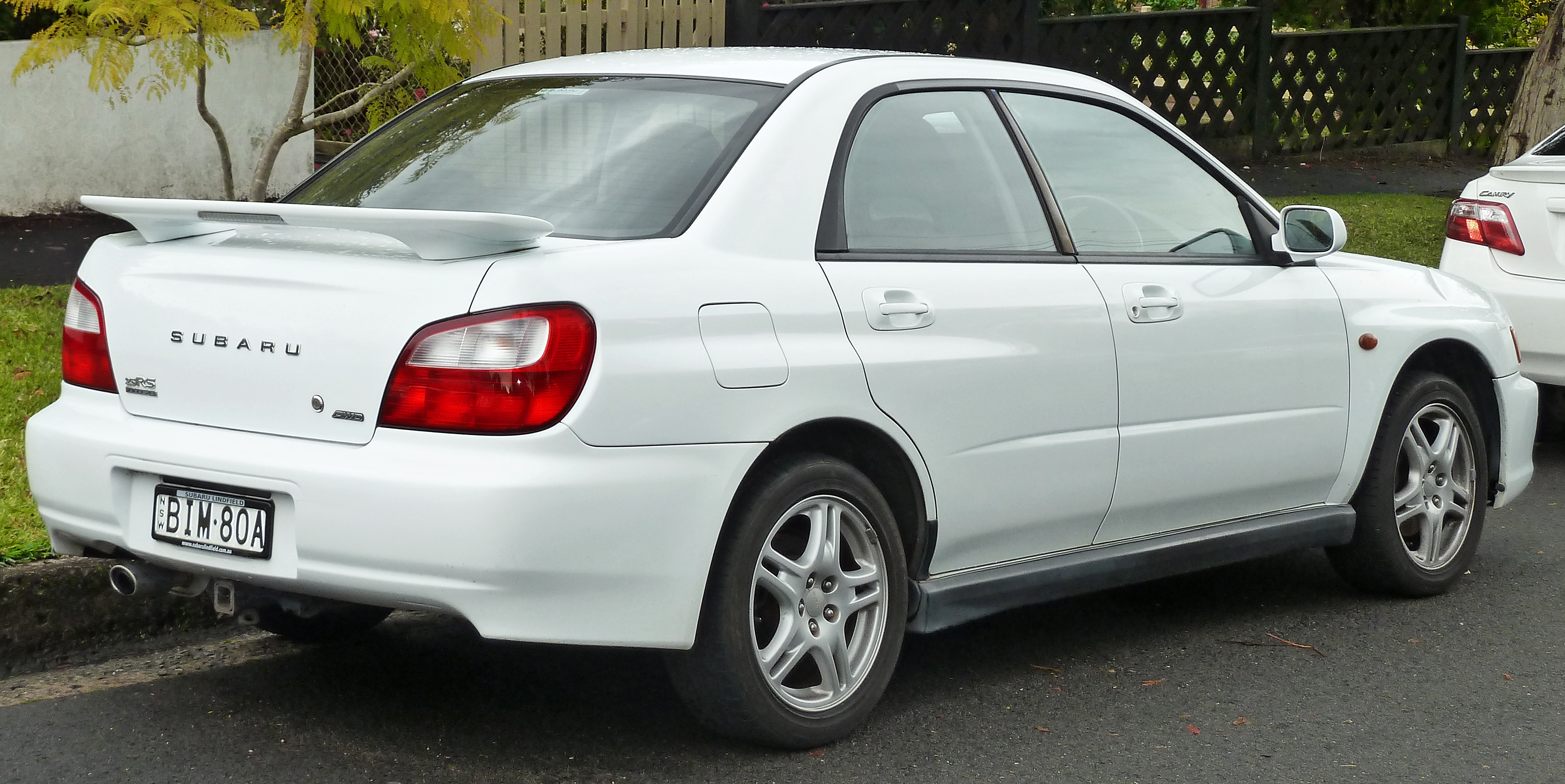
Sedan (pre-facelift)

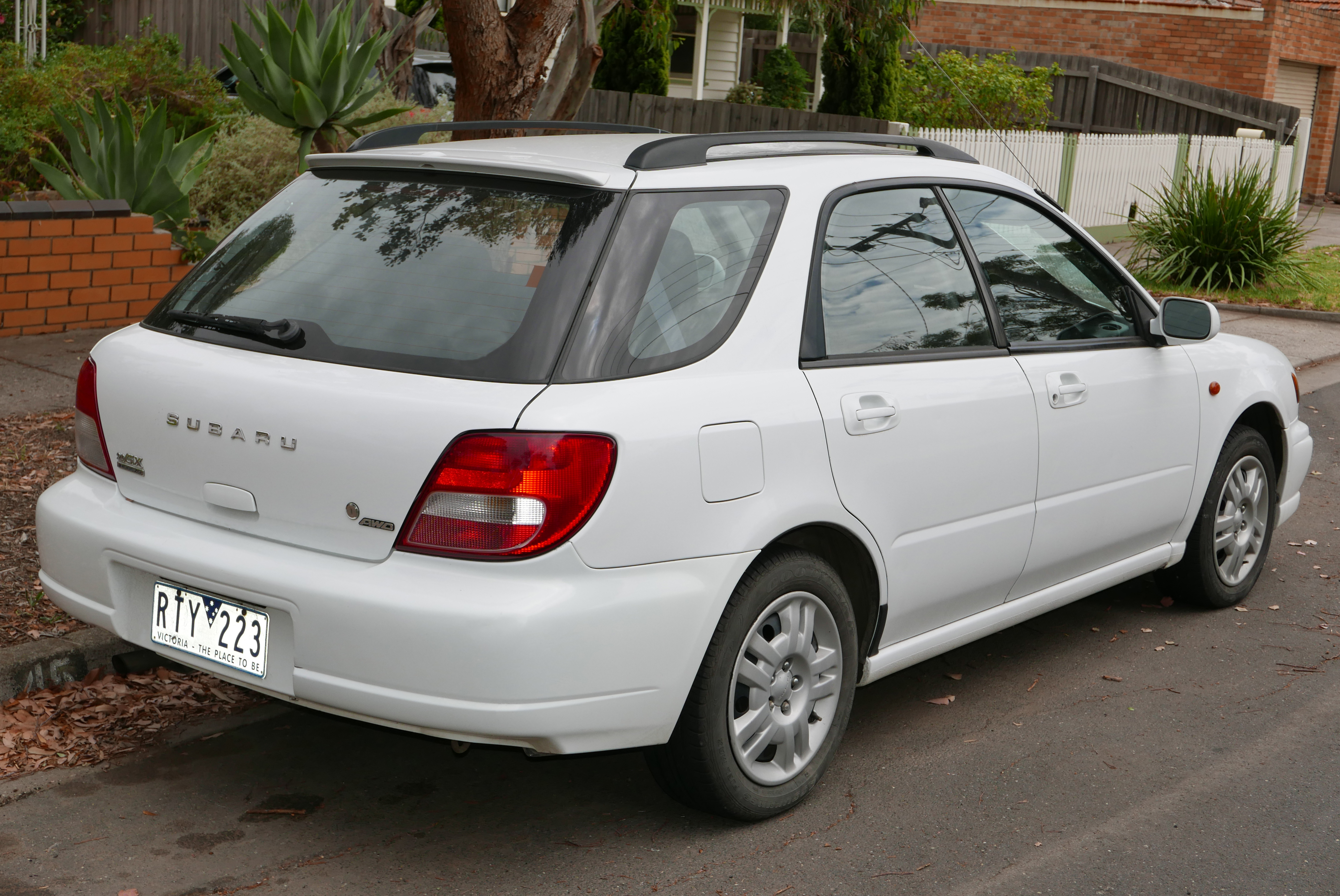
Wagon (pre-facelift)

=== First facelift (“Blob-eye”): 2002–2005 ===
After mixed reaction to the round headlight design, in 2001 Subaru enlisted the help of Peter Stevens of Prodrive, who updated the car's fascia in 2002 (2003 in the US for the 2004 model year), with more rectangular headlamps. For the US market, the facelifted Impreza was offered as 2.5 RS Sedan and TS Wagon, 2.5 Outback Sport Wagon, WRX Sedan and Wagon, and the new WRX STI Sedan. Sport Package was optional for the RS, and the WRX could be ordered with Premium Package. The RS, TS, Outback Sport, and WRX are available with manual or automatic transmission, while the sole transmission for the STI is 6-speed manual. After this facelift, a sedan without the wide fenders was offered for the Japanese market. This version of the Impreza has gained the nickname 'Blob Eye' among Subaru enthusiasts.

In 2005, Subaru made their AVCS standard on all engines used in the Impreza.

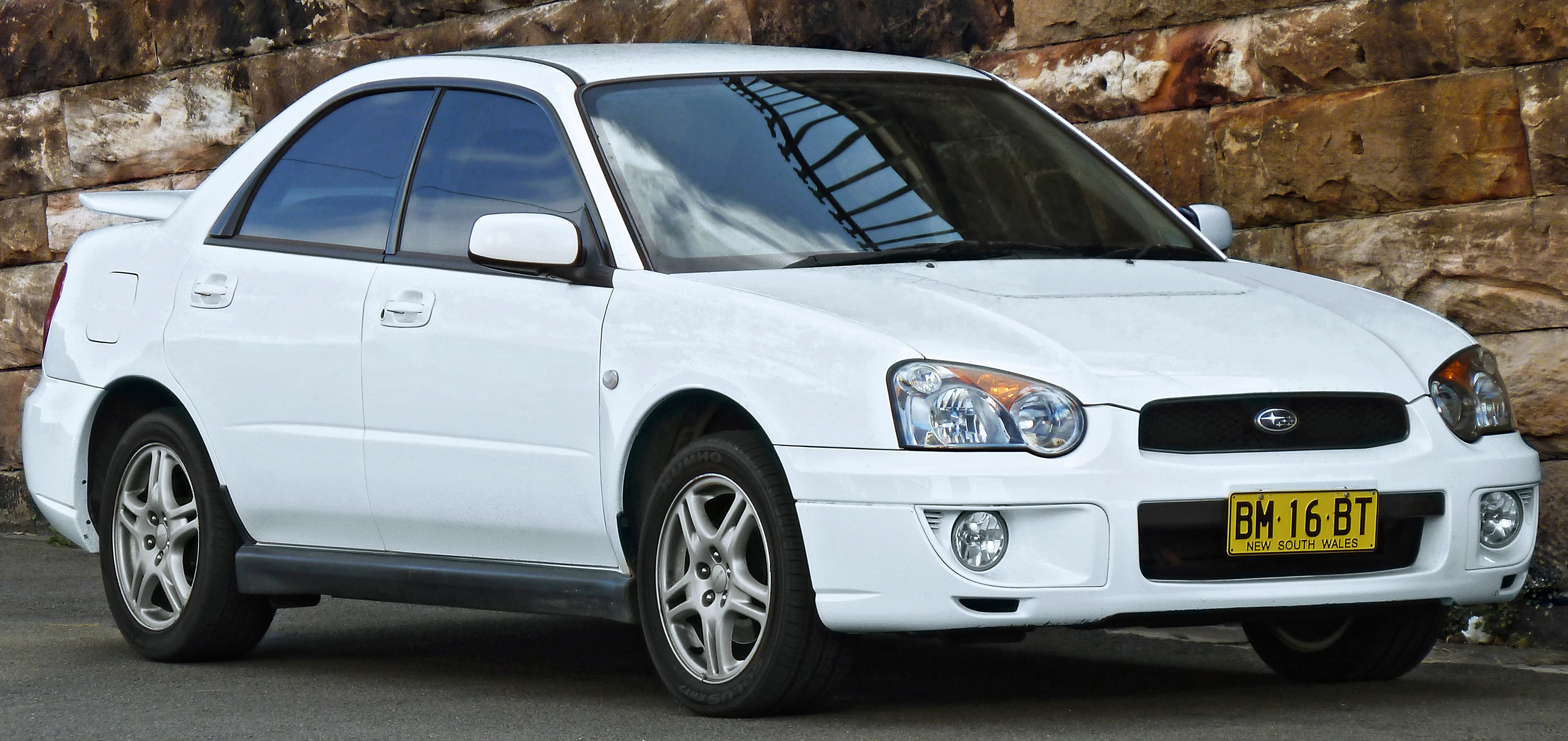
Sedan (first facelift)

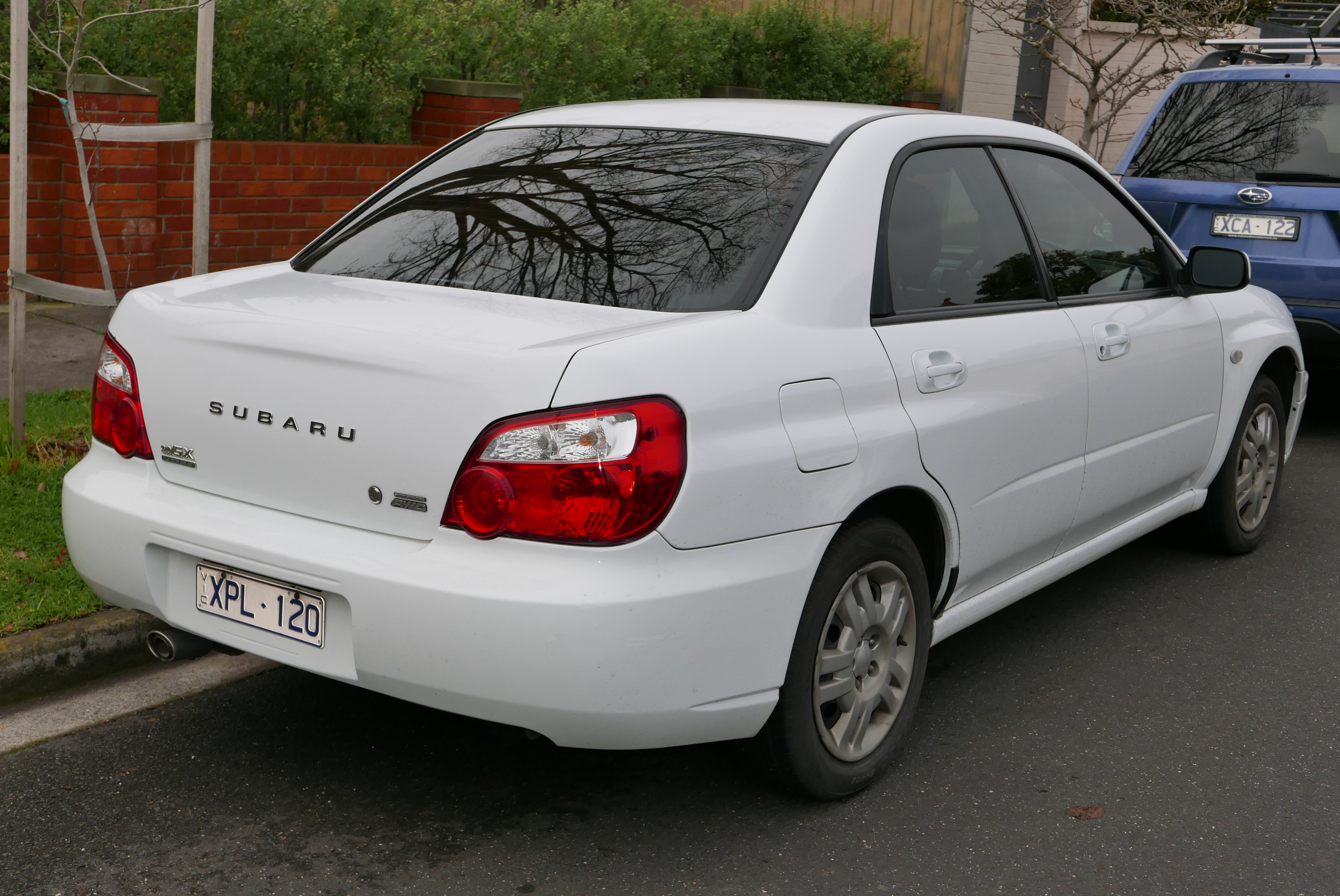
Sedan (first facelift)

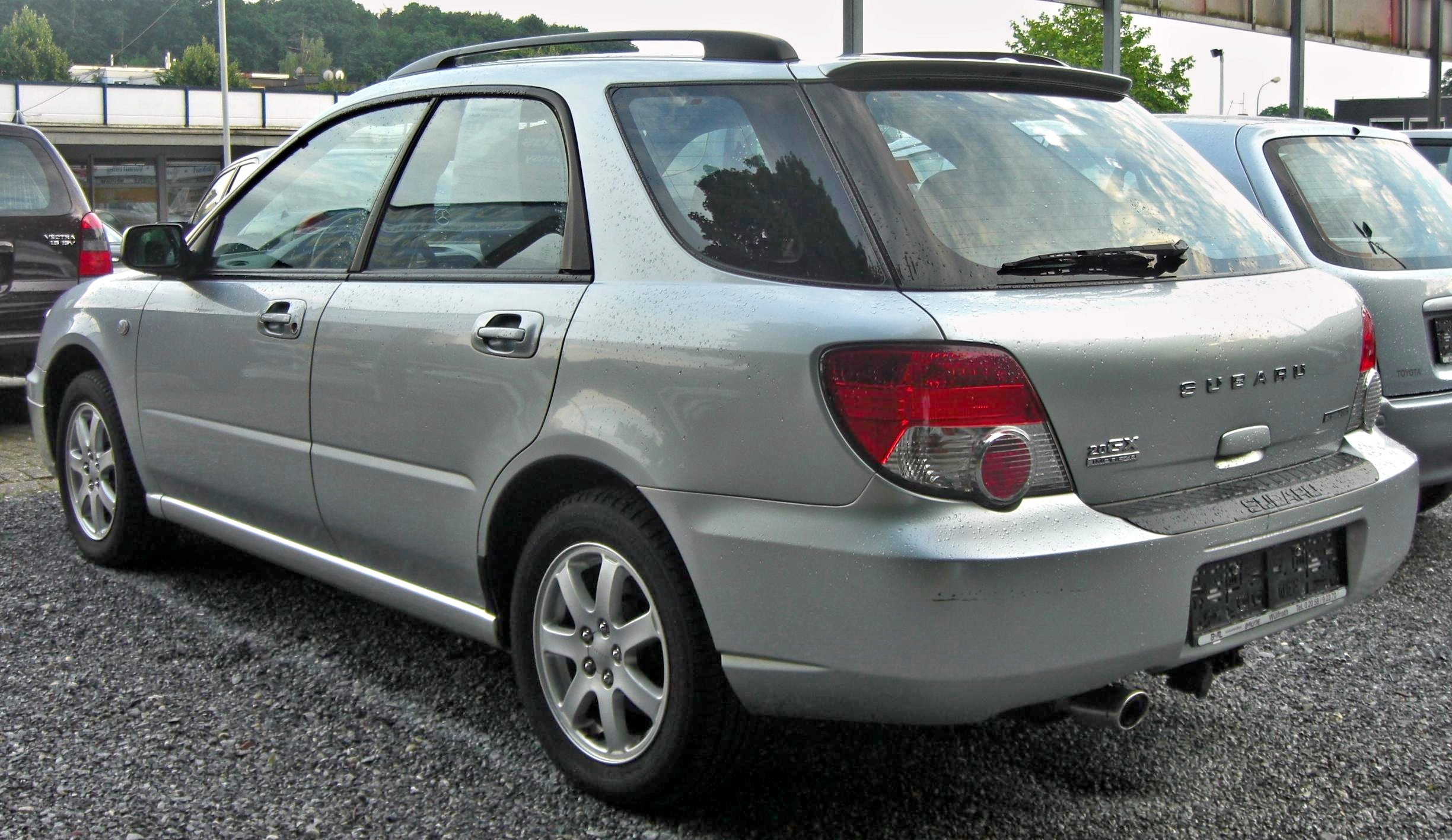
Wagon (first facelift)

=== Second facelift (“Hawk-eye”): 2005–2007 ===
From June 2005 in Japan (2006 model year) Imprezas have been redesigned, along with new headlights, taillights, and bumpers. Greek designer Andreas Zapatinas, formerly of Alfa Romeo, penned the updated front-end in 2004. The facelift introduced Subaru's new corporate face, including its controversial "jet intake and wings" grille design that first appeared on the Subaru R2 kei car. The new corporate face was designed to pay homage to their aircraft manufacturing roots, the Nakajima Aircraft Company. This version of the Impreza has gained the nickname 'Hawk Eye' among Subaru enthusiasts.

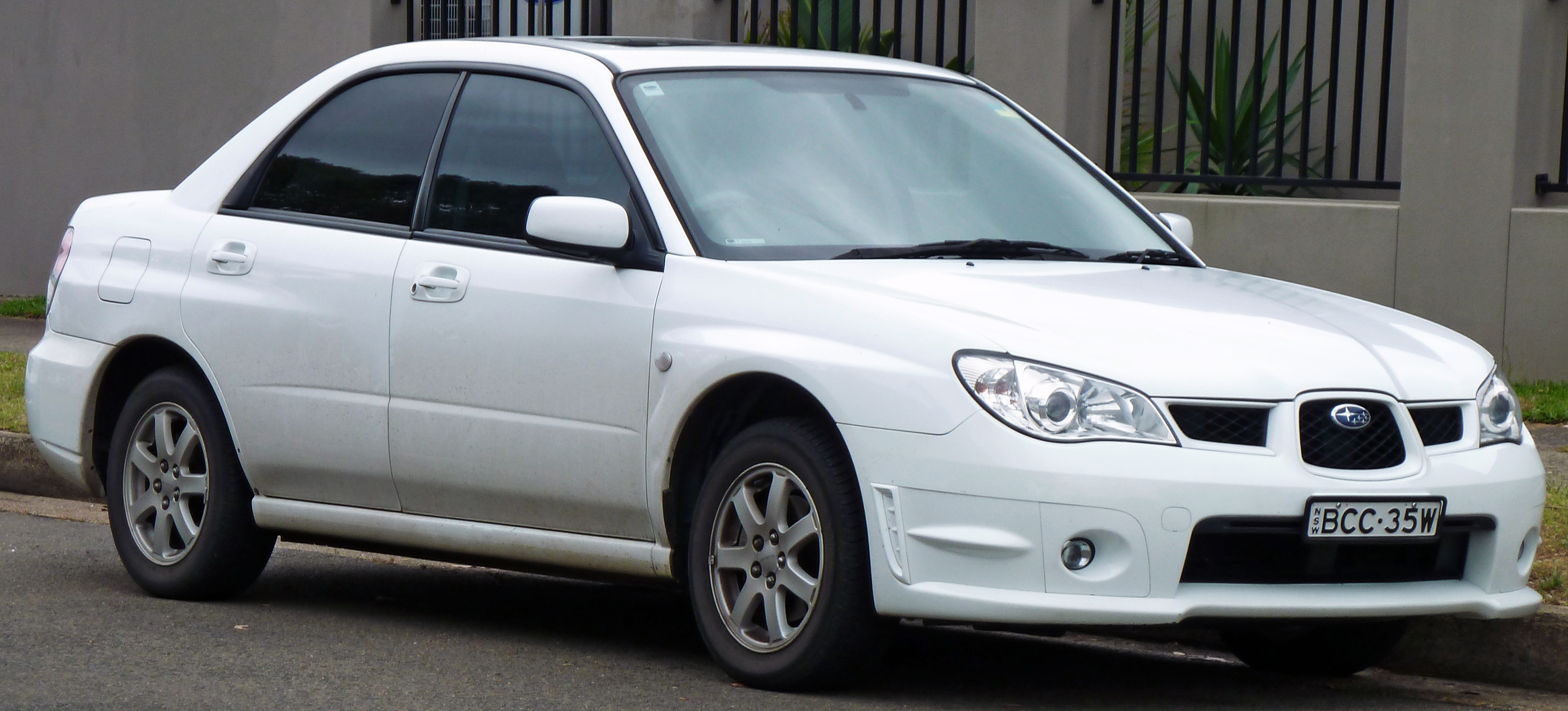
Sedan (second facelift)

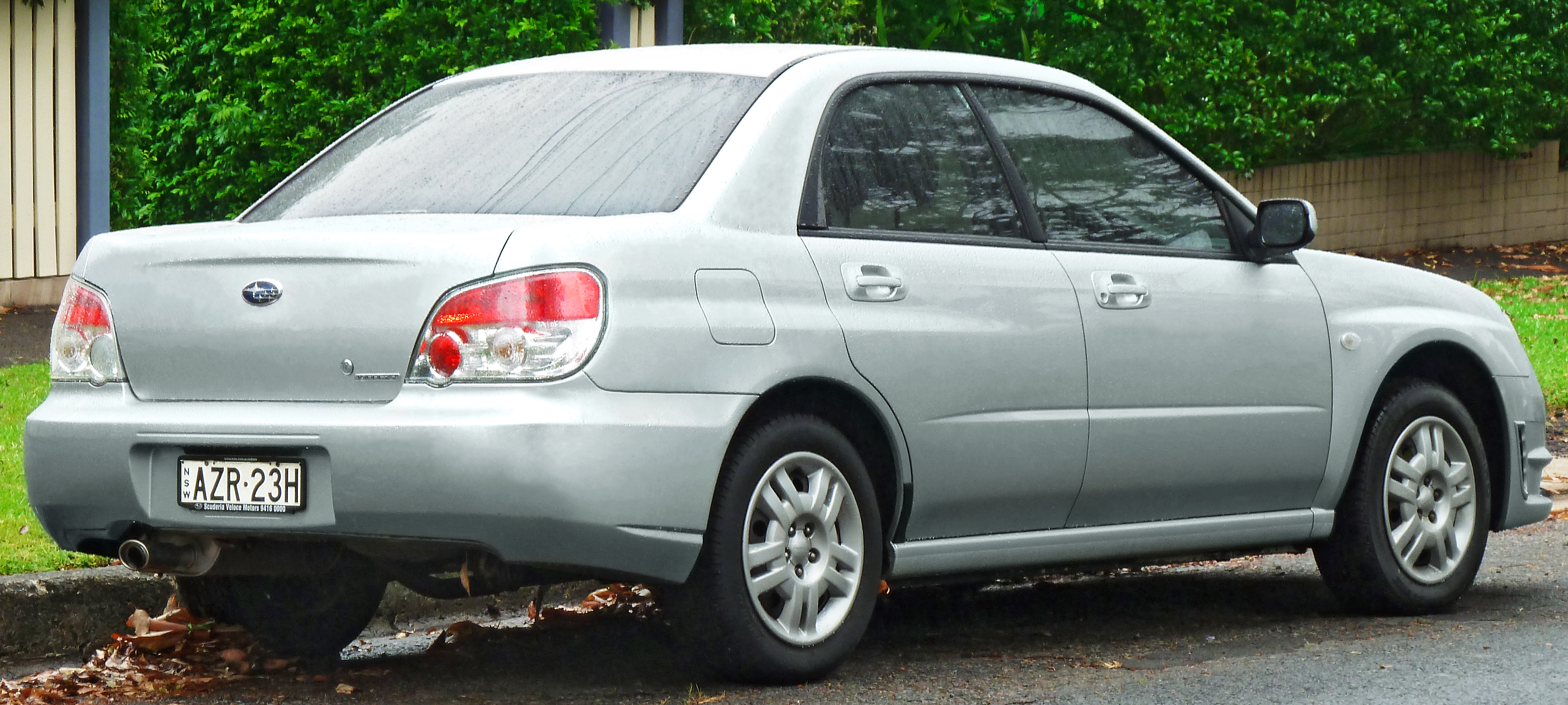
Sedan (second facelift)

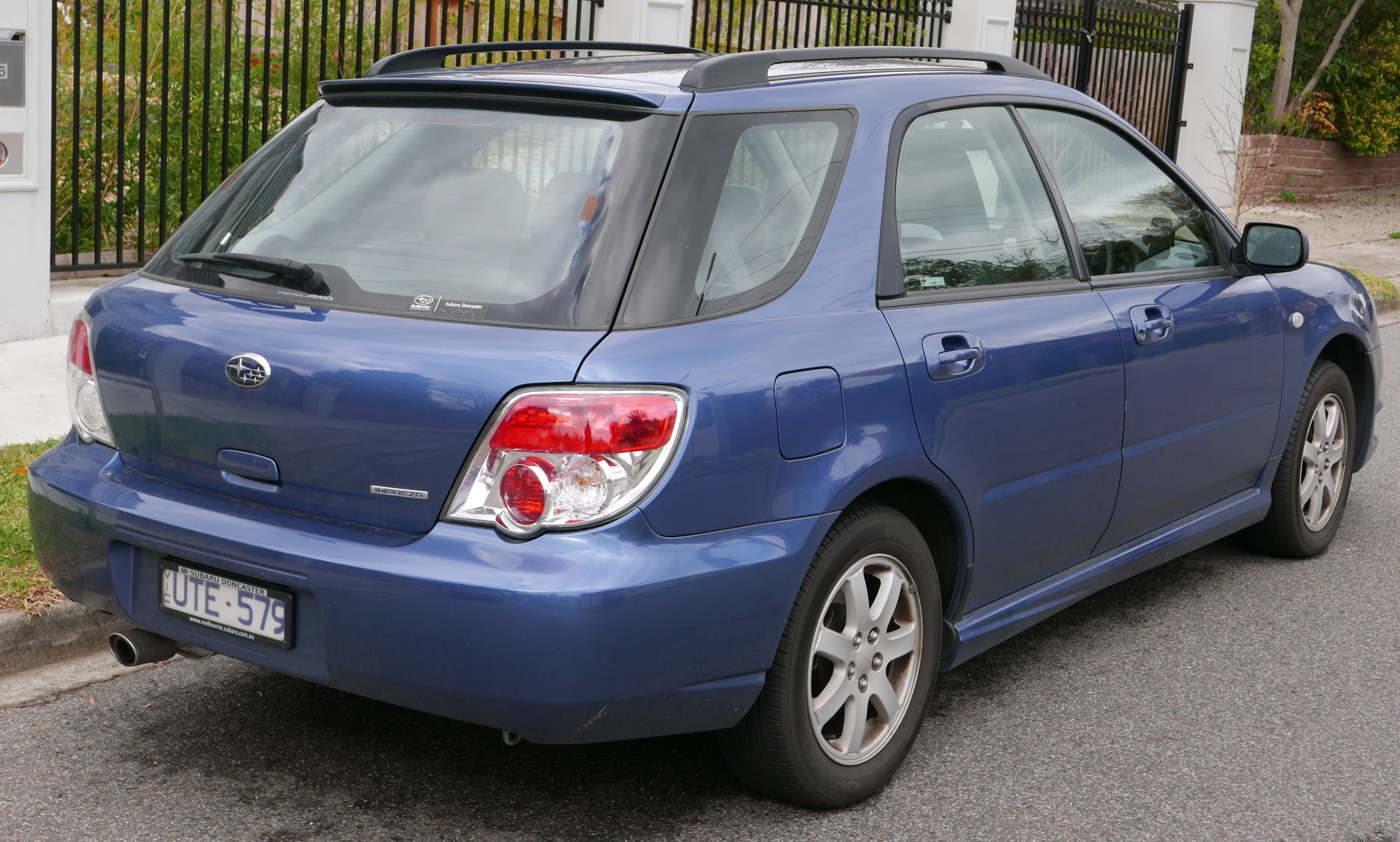
Wagon (second facelift)

== Safety ==
ANCAP test results Subaru Impreza 4 door sedan (2001)
Test	Score
Overall	4 /5 stars
Frontal offset	12.77/16
Side impact	14.72/16
Pole	Not Assessed
Seat belt reminders	0/3
Whiplash protection	Not Assessed
Pedestrian protection	Marginal
Electronic stability control	Not Assessed

== WRX ==
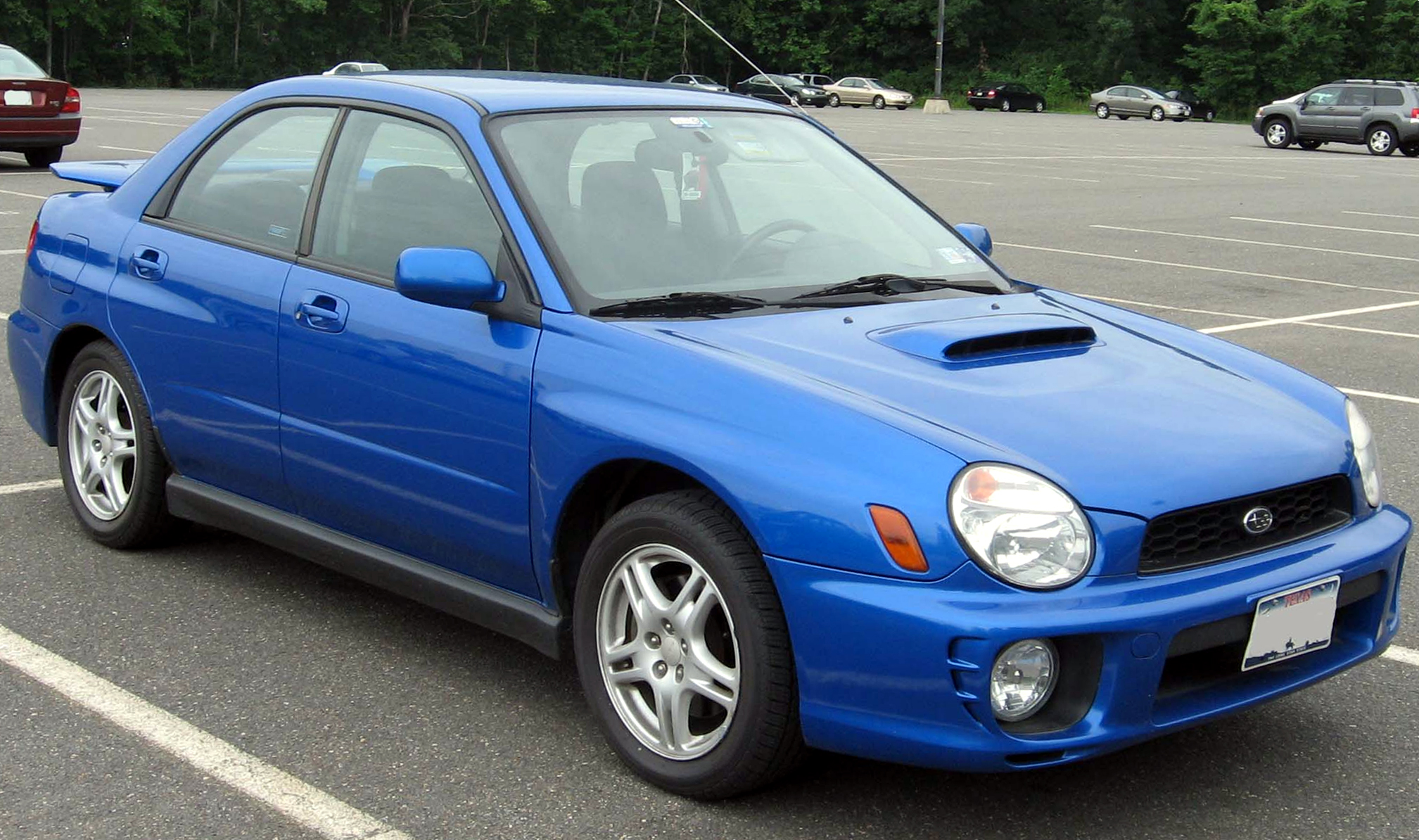
Pre-facelift Subaru Impreza WRX sedan (US)

In December 2000, Subaru updated the WRX to the second generation. The GDA WRX model also retained the 5-speed manual transmission gearbox design from the GC8. Subaru later released a new 6-speed gearbox for the STi model GDB that is significantly stronger.

The GD chassis, along with the WRX and STI, underwent two styling changes in its life cycle. The original styling applied to A and B. Initially this design proved to be rather unpopular which prompted a more conventional design for the applied C, D and E models. The second facelift applied to the F and G versions.

The WRX STi gained 17 in × 7.5 in (430 mm × 190 mm) alloy wheels over the previous 16 in × 7 in (410 mm × 180 mm) wheels, and the 5-speed manual transmission (reputed to be one of the car's weak points) was changed to an STi-engineered 6 speed manual transmission. The engine, retained from the Version 6 STi, still retains the semi-closed deck block and is still labelled as the EJ207. However the engines did gain AVCS, further improving their low-end torque production. The interior was updated with an STi logo on the gauge and the tachometer also has a red shift light. Brembo 4 piston front and 2 piston rear brakes came standard on the STi and were an option on the bare-bones Type RA STi, which still carried the Subaru 4 piston front/2 piston rear brakes as standard. Externally, the STi has a larger hood scoop and has foglight covers with the STi logo embossed on them. The DCCD was updated to work with anti-lock brakes. During braking, when the ABS is on, the DCCD will set itself to open-mode (no locking).

The version nomenclature was dropped from the name. Japanese and other auto-enthusiasts often refer to the chassis as GDB/GDF (the STi has a 'B' or 'F' (for USDM models) whereas the regular WRX had an 'A'). The fourth character of the VIN gives the revision (A to F where G is the 2007 version).

In 2000, most of Asia, Oceania and Europe received the new STi. The engine was detuned to meet emission standards. Engine output was variously rated from 265 PS (261 hp; 195 kW) at 6,000 rpm and 343 N⋅m; 253 lbf⋅ft (35 kg⋅m) of torque at 4,000 rpm, to 280 PS (276 bhp; 206 kW) at 6,400 rpm and 373 N⋅m; 275 lbf⋅ft (38 kg⋅m) of torque at 4,000 rpm depending on the market.

2005 STis received the long-awaited DCCD control available in other markets, as well as a slight wheelbase increase to match the Japanese-spec WRX STi Spec-C and has 280 PS (210 kW; 280 hp).

=== Japan ===
Applied A (2000)

August 2000 brings the 2001 WRX NB sedan. It is powered by an EJ205 with AVCS coupled with an IHI TD04-HL turbocharger. The engine produces 250 PS (184 kW; 247 hp) at 6,000 rpm with 35 kg·m (246 ft·lbf, 333 N·m) at 3,600 rpm. The wheels are 16 in (410 mm) in diameter. The car uses 2 pot/1 pot front and rear brakes. The front brake rotors are ventilated while there are rear solid disks. It has a Torsen rear LSD and a 4.44 final drive ratio. The transmission has close-ratio gears unique to Subaru of Japan at that point in time. The car has a curb weight of 1,340 kg (2,954 lb).

Aside from the WRX Type RA STi, the Sports Wagon STi also returned from the previous model, although it retained the 4 pot/2 pot Subaru calipers from the preceding STi while using narrower 17" wheels from the Legacy. Similar to the GDB, The foglight covers featured a white STi logo on them. The WRX Type RA STi was used for Group N homologation.

Applied B (2001)

The 2002MY WRX NB sedan debuts in September 2001. The mechanical specifications are similar to the previous year's model but the curb weight has been increased to 1,350 kg (2,976 lb).

Along with the rest of the Impreza line, the grille and body of the WRX STi was lightly updated by Peter Stevens to give it a more angular look when seen from the side. The color of the STi logo on the foglights was changed to pink. Aside from minor suspension improvements and a small increase in torque output, virtually everything remained unchanged.

The Type RA was replaced by the WRX STi Spec C. This model was much lighter than the Type RA as it received lighter glass and body panels. The Spec C's handling was much improved due to an increase in caster (from 3.5 degrees to 5 degrees). This was achieved not by changing the suspension mounting point, but by lengthening the wheelbase by 15 mm (0.6 in). This was done by including different control arms. This increased caster significantly helped the turn-in capabilities of the car. The Spec C also has a steering rack ratio of 13:1. The transmission is supplied with its own oil cooler.

The Sports Wagon STi had ceased production by this time.

Applied C (2002)

The WRX NB-R sedan is released in November 2002. The power and torque ratings are the same as the previous year. The wheel diameters are increased to 17" in size. The rear brake rotor is changed to a ventilated disk, leaving the car to use only ventilated disks for braking. The car has 4 pot/2 pot front and rear brakes. The rear wing is on wing risers. The car now weighs 1,361 kg (3,000 lb).

The WRX STi was used for Group N homologation.

Applied D (2003)

The WRX line receives a body exterior update and an improved transmission. The WRX STi is now capable of being ordered with DCCD.

The WRX STi Spec C Type RA was released. It sported a carbon-fiber wing and a carbon fiber lip. It also had a new set of BBS wheels as well as a newly tuned engine.

The WRX STi V-Limited was released. It sports 4-way dampers tuned by Subaru World Rally Team's Group N driver Toshi Arai. The WRX STi was used for Group N homologation.

Applied E (2004)

The WRX WR-limited is introduced. The car receives an STI spoiler and an STI front chin. There is a WR-stickered titanium shift knob. The wheels are changed for STI, gold-colored Rays-sourced wheels.

This was the first Impreza STi model to be offered in the United States. Subaru unveiled this model at the Detroit International Auto Show, only 1 month after Mitsubishi announced the arrival of the 271 horsepower Lancer Evolution 8, which out-performed the 2.0L WRX.

Applied F (2005)

The WRX has an option to receive the same spoiler as the WRX STI. The WRX has a viscous rear LSD now.

The WRX STi receives the same increase in wheelbase as the Spec C. All STis received additional rear arch flaring in order to allow an increase in wheel size. The wheel size changed from 17 in × 7.5 in (430 mm × 190 mm) to 17 in × 8 in (430 mm × 200 mm). In accordance with the increased wheel width, steering lock-to-lock turns have been reduced. Wheel hub strength was improved. The P.C.D. was changed from 5 x 100 mm to 5 x 114.3 mm. The interior was vastly improved as well. A whole new center console now brings out a very high grade interior feel.

The WRX STI Spec C's receives the Arai tuned dampers and a 21 mm (0.8 in) swaybar. The rear suspension is changed from rubber bushings to pillowball bushings. The strut tower was further stiffened for improved handling and stability. The strut towers were reinforced for better handling and better ride characteristics. The engine mounts were changed from metal to liquid-filled plastic mounts to reduce vibrations into the car's cabin. Some 2006 owners have had issues with these plastic engine mounts. The manufacturer will replace them, under warranty if broken, with the 2005 rubber mounts. The DCCD is updated with the use of a torque-sensing mechanism inside the DCCD. The torque split is changed to 41/59. The WRX STI Spec C was used for Group N homologation.

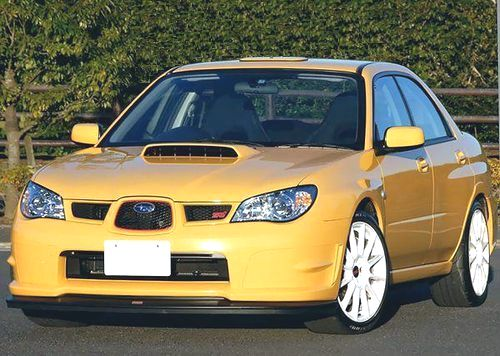
Subaru Impreza WRX STI Spec C Type RA-R

The WRX STI Spec C Type RA was released in November 2005, with 350 units produced. The Type RA added the following to the Spec C model from the STI parts catalogue: 4-way STI adjustable inverted struts, STI Japan-spec pink springs, STI rear lateral links, STI rear trailing links, STI 21 mm (0.8 in) rear sway bar, STI rear pillowball suspension, STI 110 mm (4.3 in) opening rear axleback exhaust, STI 17 in × 8 in (430 mm × 200 mm) Enkei-made wheels and STI V-lip front spoiler.

Applied G (2007)

The car is mechanically the same as the previous Japan-spec revision.

For the STI, changes include a different turbocharger VF43 equipped with a slightly larger wastegate port to prevent boost creep (VF43, as opposed to VF39 in the older version) and revised gearing on the 6-speed manual transmission. They also use top feed injectors instead of side feed injectors like the previous STi models (04-06USDM). This means the intake manifold is a bit different as well as the TVG (Tumble Valve Generators) used for emissions on cold start-ups.

Special Editions (STI)
S202 STi

This car is an S-series Impreza based on the featherweight Type RA Spec C, where RA stands for “Record Attempt.” It's rather special and still considered the most radical and extreme factory-built STi (Subaru Tecnica International) to date. Apparently, Petter Solberg, Subaru driver and winner of Rally GB at that time, reckons that of all the roadgoing Imprezas he's driven, the S202 feels most like his WRC car. All of the suspension and powertrain parts included STi parts from the STi part catalogue. The interior included special edition STi seats with red STi logo stitching. A smaller, lightweight air-cond compressor was fitted to save weight. The S202 had a production run of 400 units for the Japanese domestic market and was sold-out in a mere two weeks. Individually numbered badges for each car is located under the ashtray. Even when the S202 was sold with electric windows and air-cond intact, the car weighed a full 140 kg (309 lb) less than the stock STi at 1,330 kg (2,932 lb) (fairly lightweight considering this is a car with an AWD layout) and put out 316 bhp (320 hp). No thick heavy carpets, lightweight aluminum hood, thinner door skins and cards, thinner glass windows, special fitted lightweight STi parts to replace the lower arms and a lightweight alternator. Unique to the S202 are the pink STi lateral links. The brake rotors were gas slotted. The steering rack was swapped out to one with an uprated ratio. With the S202 STi model, they also re-did some of the internals too. Molybdenum coated pistons were used to lower friction together with hollow intake valves. The AWD-system consists of a Suretrac diff upfront and mechanical diff at the rear. The wheels were STi labeled Rays Volk alloys. The exterior featured an adjustable carbon-fiber GT-style wing at the back (of which only 400 were produced) and a manually operated roof vent – rally car style. Less known to the non S-Series enthusiasts, the S202 came with many other rally-use parts such as steel braided brake lines, 12 liter intercooler tank at the back, and an additional anti-surge fuel tank to name a few. The later S models specifically the S203 and S204 were heavier as they were not based on the Spec C chassis, whilst the S202 emphasized on reducing weight as it was based on the Type RA Spec C. Strictly based on specs, the S202 was the first radical Type RA Spec C. The other model that was produced later based on the Spec C was the Spec C Type RA-R. Of late, the rare S202 has become a collectors' car especially among enthusiasts.

S203

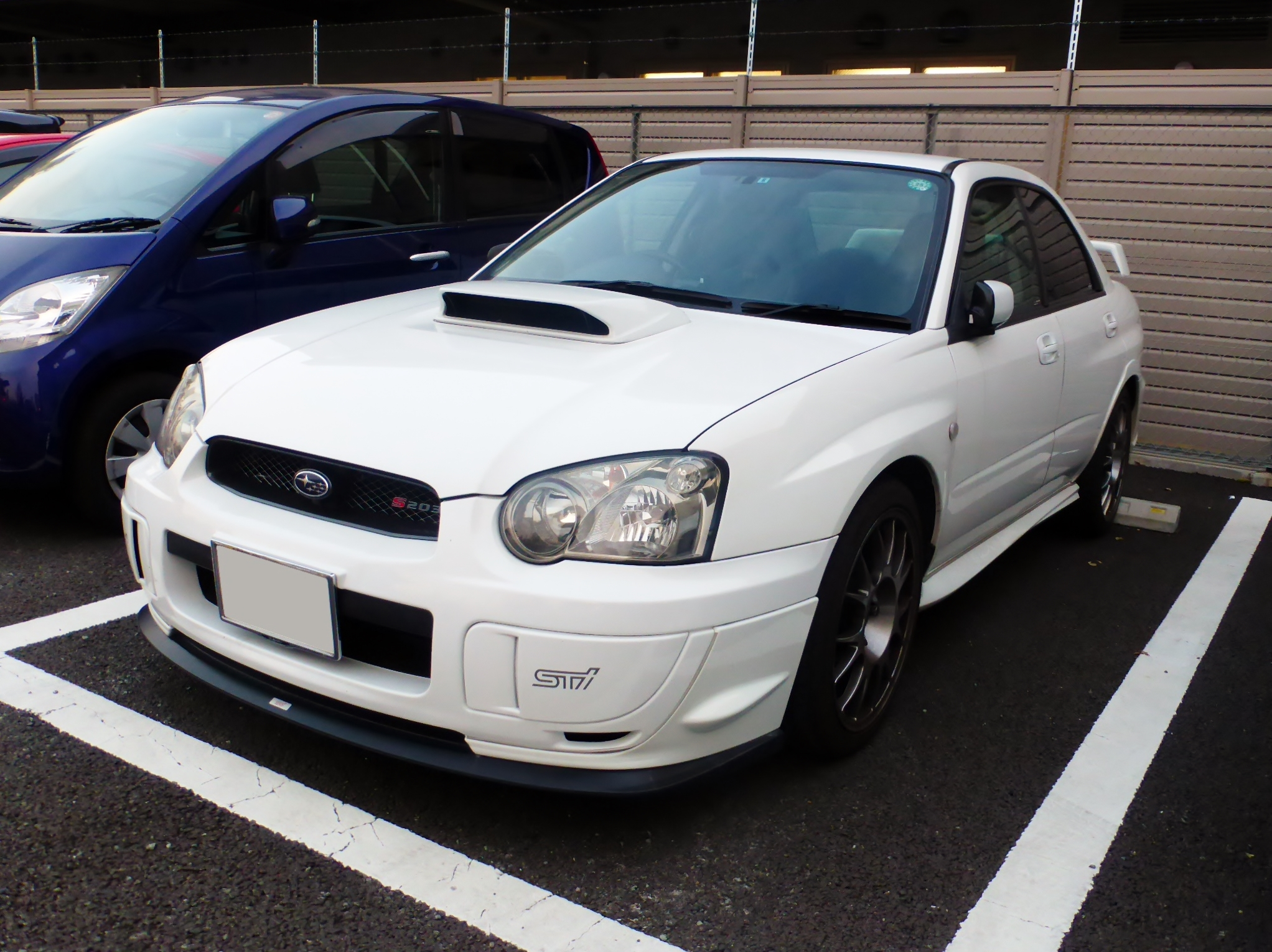
Subaru Impreza WRX STi S203

This limited edition Subaru was an S-series Impreza based on the WRX STi. Again it is basically a car with all the STi parts available. It was sold with custom-made 18 in (460 mm) BBS alloys with Pirelli tyres.

S204

The new S204 was released at the end of 2005. It is based on the WRX STi and similar to the S203. It does away with the roof spoiler and has a different grille from the rest of the Impreza line. The S204 has a two-liter (EJ20) H4 engine capable of developing 324 PS (239 kW; 320 bhp) and a six-speed manual gearbox. When cruising the S204 achieves 100 km/h (62 mph) at 3,000 rpm in top gear and can reach 220 km/h (137 mph) at approximately 6,600 rpm.

Suspension can be described as 'stiff' with torsional rigidity enhanced by the inclusion of laterally mounted items described as "performance dampers" bearing both the STi logo and Yamaha. As a result, cornering can be described as excellent. The addition of a carbon fiber front-lip spoiler and a rear diffuser on an already low suspension setup plus the use of low-profile Pirelli P Zero (Corsa) tires implies the S204 is intended mostly for sealed road use.

Recaro has used carbon fibre extensively in the manufacture of the driver and front passenger seats available in the S204. The high side bolsters provide significant support to the driver during maneuvers that induce lateral forces and are considered to be an integral feature to the cornering performance of this vehicle. The seats are rigid in design and have relatively little cushioning compared to other Impreza models.

Advertising material produced by Subaru for the S204 indicate that a limited run of 600 S204's were made. Individually numbered badges for each car are located within the engine bay and repeated as a small plaque situated at the base of the gear lever. However, five WRX STI S204 were made available to Subaru enthusiasts in New Zealand. Unlike other S204s sent to other nations (for example 30 units for Singapore) these five cars do not display either the in-cabin or in-engine bay badging that uniquely identifies each of the reported 600 vehicles manufactured. The lack of individual badging for these five cars brings into question the real number of S204s manufactured.

WRX STI Spec C Type RA-R

At the end of October 30, 2007, WRX STI Spec C Type RA-Rs were open for ordering. These cars are based on the WRX STI Spec C. The wheels are changed for 18-inch (460 mm), STI-branded, Enkei-made, white wheels. The engine has been blueprinted and balanced. It produces 320 PS (235 kW; 316 hp) of power. The suspension is built with the latest STI parts from the STI catalogue. The front brakes are 6-piston Brembo brakes. The turbocharger is based on the larger S203/S204 twin scroll unit. The brakes are made so that they change from silver to gold when heated from usage. The rotors are slotted. The 2nd R in "RA-R" is stated by an STI engineer to mean "radical".

WRX STI A-Line

This WRX STI A-Line is mechanically the same as the Japan-spec STI. The exterior has been toned down with the removal of large rear spoiler, black Brembo brakes, titanium colored Enkei wheels, a black STI front lip and leather seats in order to target the more mature market.

=== Australia ===
Rev. A (2001)

The WRX has an EJ205 rated at 218 PS (160 kW; 215 hp) at 6,000 rpm. It carries 17 in × 7 in (430 mm × 180 mm) wheels and has 4-piston/2-piston front and rear brakes with ventilated disk rotors all around.

Rev. B (2002)

Due to complaints of slower acceleration in comparison to the GC-chassis WRX, the gear ratios and diff ratio are changed to the same specifications as the Japanese domestic market WRX to improve overtaking and in gear acceleration. The result is near identical first and second gear ratios to the GC, but with a noticeably shorter third, fourth and fifth gear.

Also added was a Suretrac limited-slip rear differential. Japanese engineers claimed that drive would still be directed to the gripping wheel even if the other wheel was off the ground.

Rev. D (2004)

The WRX received the same Peter Stevens-designed facelift that rest of the Imprezas received. During 2005 a limited edition Subaru Impreza WRX WRP10 was produced, but limited to 200 vehicles. The Australian market models received an engine upgrade to 168 kW (228 PS; 225 hp) and 300 N⋅m (221 lb⋅ft) of torque via a compression ratio increase to 9.0:1 and the addition of variable valve timing on the intake camshafts.

The Subaru Impreza WRX WRP10 (2005) is a limited-edition version of the Impreza WRX exclusive to the Australian market. The WRP10 was available from late January 2005 and was limited to 200 units, featuring individually numbered badges. It includes enhancements to the wheels, tires, suspension, engine, and exhaust over a standard WRX. The 'WR' stands for 'World Rally', the 'P' for Subaru's partnership with Pirelli tires, and the '10' indicates the 10th anniversary of this partnership. STi carbon fiber engine bay strut brace and WRX suspension lowering kit with STi springs drop the car's ride height by 15 mm (0.6 in). Together, the STi sports parts increase rigidity for improved ride and handling; giving the WRP10 a more aggressive stance. WRP10 includes an STI replacement Electronic Control Unit increasing peak power from standard WRX's 168 kW (225 hp) at 6,000 rpm to 175 kW (235 hp) at 6,000 rpm. Torque is increased by 2 N⋅m (1 lb⋅ft) to 302 N⋅m (223 lb⋅ft) at 4,000 rpm. Be aware that the WRP10's STi tuned ECU is not flash-tune compatible as it's been locked by STi.

=== Europe ===
The Prodrive Performance Pack (PPP) is an official accessory for UK GD-chassis WRXs. It evolved from the WR Sport pack fitted to some RB5s. The 2007 version costs £1700 including VAT and fitting, raising power output from 230 PS (169 kW; 227 hp) to 270 PS (199 kW; 266 hp) and torque to 420 N⋅m (310 lb⋅ft).

Rev. A (2001)

The WRX is powered by an EJ205 rated at 218 PS (160 kW; 215 hp) at 6,000 rpm. It features 17 in × 7 in (430 mm × 180 mm) wheels and has 4-piston/2-piston front and rear brakes.

Rev. B (2002)

Due to complaints of the slower acceleration of the GD-chassis WRX compared to the GC-chassis WRX, the gear ratios are changed to the same specifications as the Japanese-spec WRX to improve acceleration.

Rev. D (2004)

The WRX received the same Peter Stevens-designed facelift that rest of the Imprezas received. The engine powerplant was improved to produce 225 PS (165 kW; 222 hp). Some cost reductions were made, such as downgrading the stereo.

Rev. F (2006)

2006: Europe receives WRXs with the EJ25. The power output is 230 PS (169 kW; 227 hp) at 5,600 rpm with 32.6 kg·m (236 ft·lbf, 320 N·m) of torque at 3,600 rpm. The car weighs 1,405 kg (3,097 lb). The final drive ratio on this car is 4.111:1. The car also received the same facelift as the other markets.

=== North America ===
Applied A (2000)

WRX's initial release date 2000.

Applied B (2001)

North America receives its first Impreza WRX models. They are equipped with an EJ205 engine rated at 227 hp (169 kW) at 6,000 rpm with 217 lb⋅ft (294 N⋅m) of torque at 4,000 rpm. Unlike the Japanese EJ205, the US-spec engine uses a Mitsubishi TD04-13T turbocharger unit. In stock form, it reaches a peak 13.6 psi (0.9 bar) of boost. The seats are the same as the basic J-spec Impreza. The wheels are cast 16 in × 6.5 in (410 mm × 170 mm) version of the J-spec WRX NB wheels while the brakes are 2-piston/1-piston front and rear with the front rotors being ventilated disks. 2002 WRXs came with brake duct plates that guided the air in the front bumper vent to the wheel well. The gear ratios are the standard export models, but the final drive is a 3.9:1 ratio. The rear LSD is a viscous coupling type. The steering rack has a ratio of 16.5:1. The 4 gear electronic automatic transmission (4EAT) WRXs have a Variable Torque Distribution AWD system instead of the conventional viscous coupling center differential. VTD employs an electronically-controlled hydraulic transfer clutch and a planetary gear center differential to distribute power in a 45:55 split between the front and rear axles under normal circumstances. The VTD system uses multiple sensors to measure front and rear driveshaft speeds, throttle position and gear selection. Then it actively transfers power accordingly between the front and rear wheels for optimum traction and handling. The WRX weighs 3,085 lb (1,399 kg).

Applied C (2002–2003)

There are few changes from applied B. The gears are changed to RA-width gears (1 mm increase in size) to increase durability of the transmission. There is also a valve that prevents "drop-clutch" starts in an effort to reduce the number of shattered gear boxes from abusive AWD launching. The ignition ring is now illuminated with green lighting. Early 2002 WRXs had brake duct plates. At the end of calendar year 2002, the brake duct plates were no longer equipped on the WRXs. A shorter metal fuel pipe and longer connector hose were implemented under the intake manifold to avoid fuel leaks at freezing temperatures.

Applied D (2004)

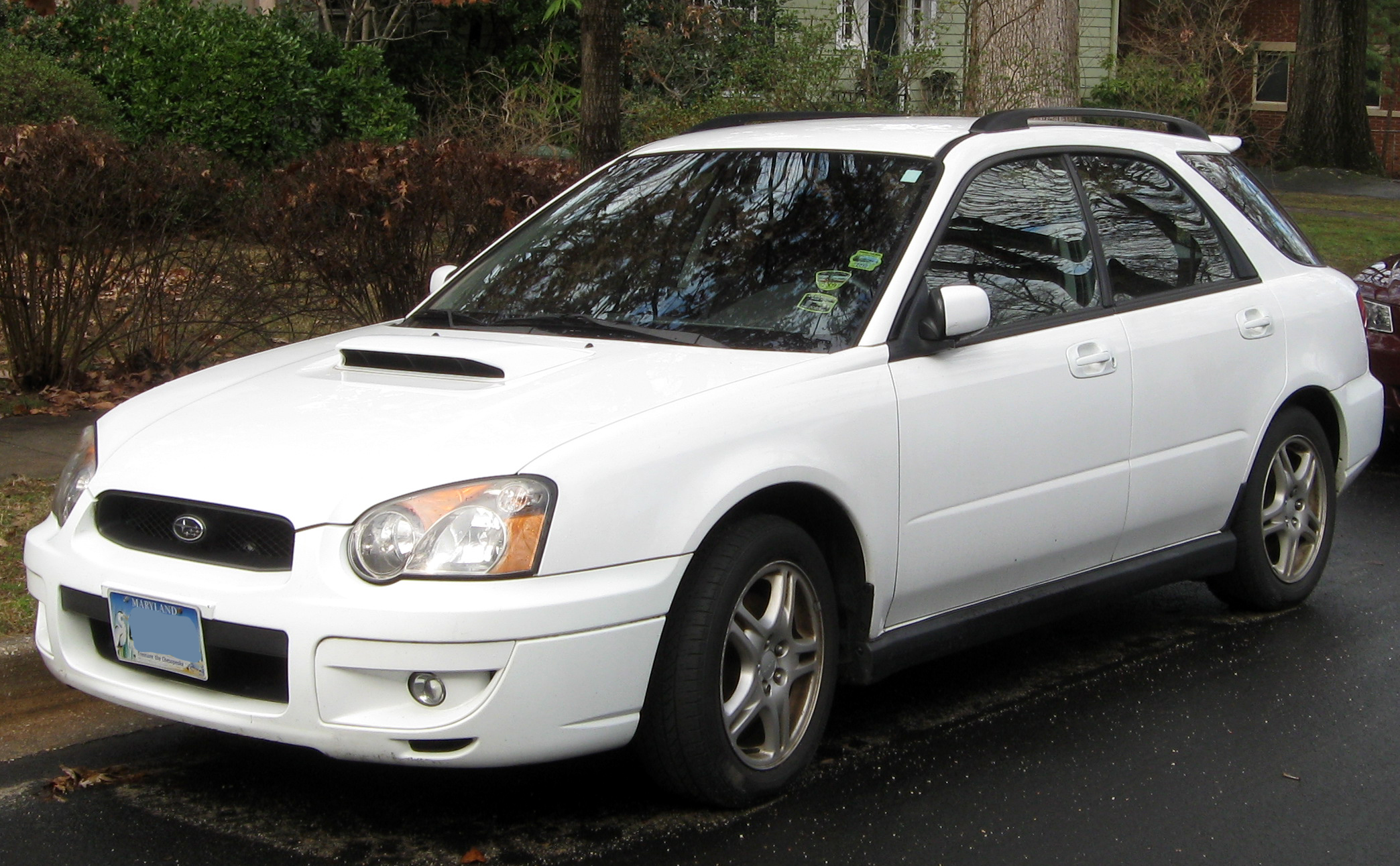
2004–2005 Subaru Impreza WRX wagon (US)

The WRX received the same Peter Stevens-designed facelift that rest of the Imprezas received. The WRX uses the same contoured seats as the 2004 US-spec WRX STI. The WRX is equipped with multi-phase valve struts to improve ride quality while retaining good handling. The tachometer was moved to center, and the speedometer was moved to the right.

In 2004, Subaru of America announced it would sell the WRX STi. Subaru Tecnica International's president said in an interview with Road & Track magazine that he wished to beat the Mitsubishi Lancer Evolution in the US. Thus, each iteration of the US-spec WRX STi is essentially the same as the respective J-spec STi Spec C. All part numbers matched up, including the part-numbers for the glass windows and dampers. However, instead of the EJ207, the United States receives the first EJ257, a 2.5-liter version of the EJ207. Unlike the EJ207, it features hypereutectic cast pistons.

According to Subaru USA, this latest STi piston is a cast aluminum design. However, this is a special hypereutectic material and it has an augmentation of 120% in terms of strength over their previous aluminium pistons. The steering rack is the standard STi's 15.2:1 instead of the Spec C's 13:1

Applied E (2005)

The WRX received an updated interior, body color rocker panels, black painted headlamp bezels, and wheels that were previously seen on the base US-spec Legacy and a single-port exhaust. Some WRX models have an STI hood scoop that is much larger than other WRX scoops. The suspension has also received a few small updates to make handling more efficient compared to the 2004 model. Cassette players in the stereo system were no longer offered.

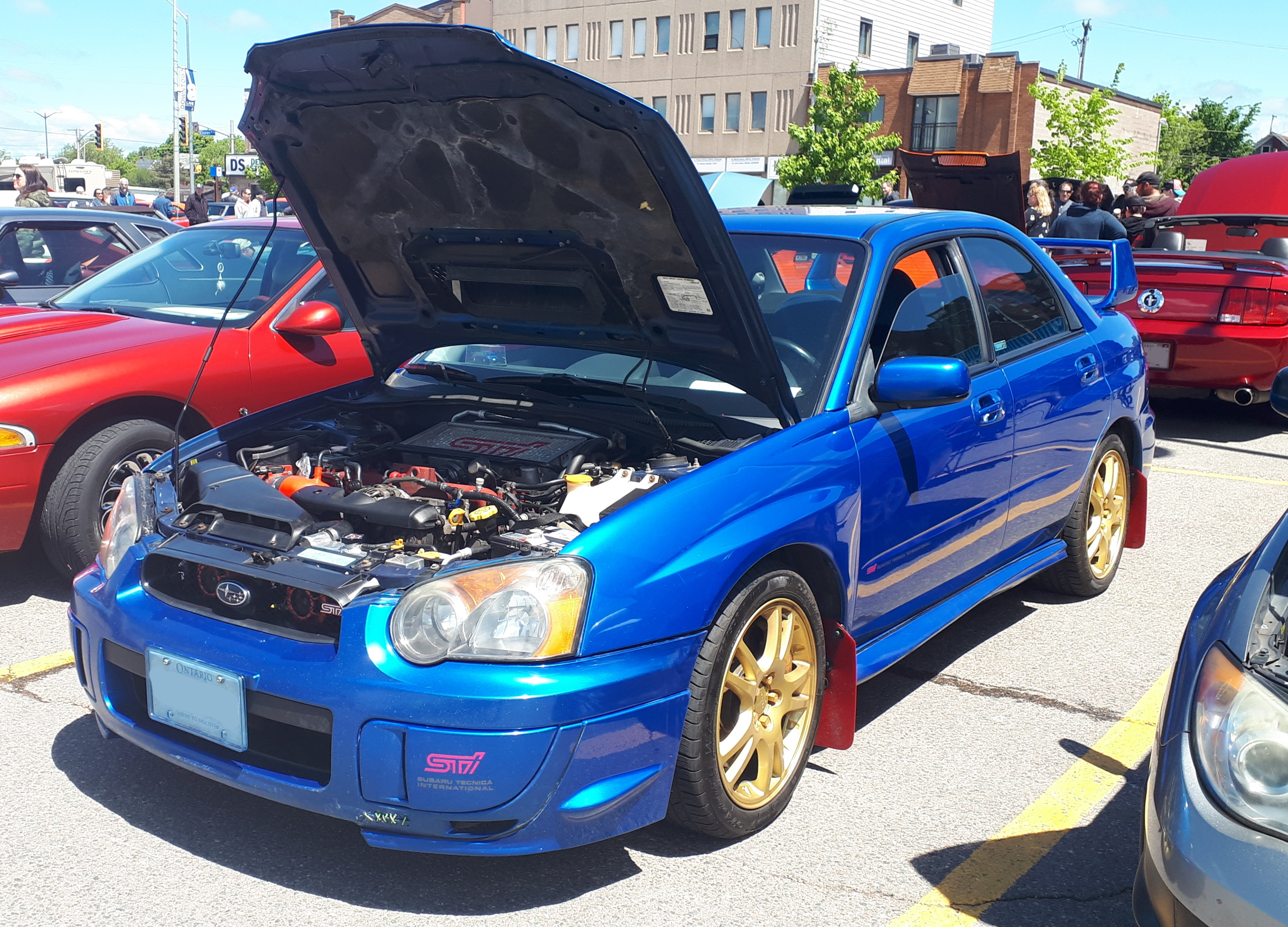
2005 Subaru Impreza WRX STI (note the coloured rocker panels for the 2005 model year)

As with the Japanese-spec C models, US-spec STis received additional rear fender flaring in order to allow an increase in wheel size. The wheel size went from 17 in × 7.5 in (430 mm × 190 mm) to 17 in × 8 in (430 mm × 200 mm). In accordance with the increased wheel width, steering lock-to-lock turns have been reduced. Wheel hub strength was improved. The P.C.D. was changed from 5 x 100 to 5 x 114.3. The Suretrac front LSD in the 2004 model was replaced with a helical unit, the rear differential remains the same clutch type unit. Torque split is set at 35/65. In the interior, the stereo became standard. The badging has been revised and different look was given to the steering wheel, shift knob, HVAC controls, and center console.

Applied F (2006)

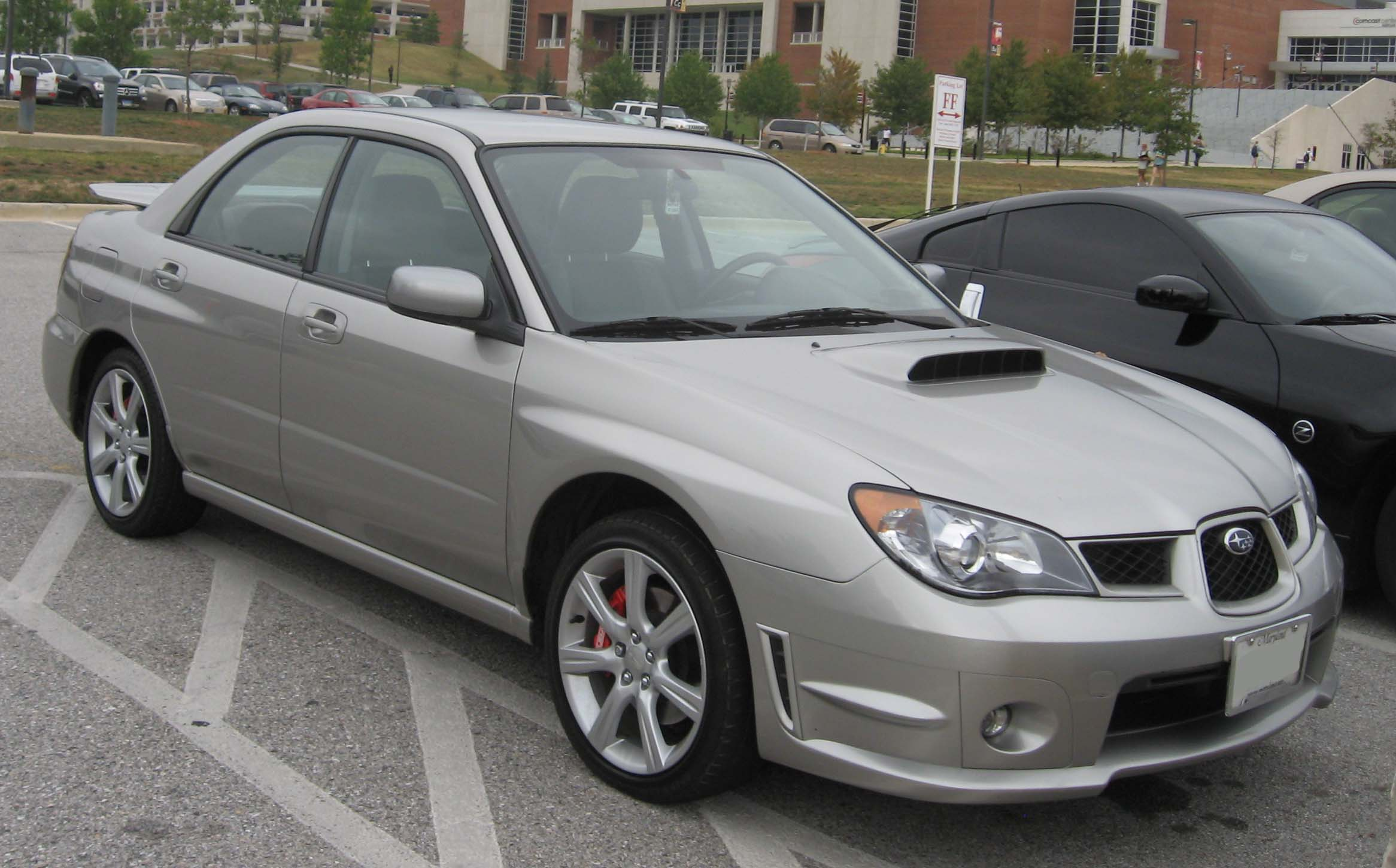
2006–2007 Subaru WRX sedan (US)

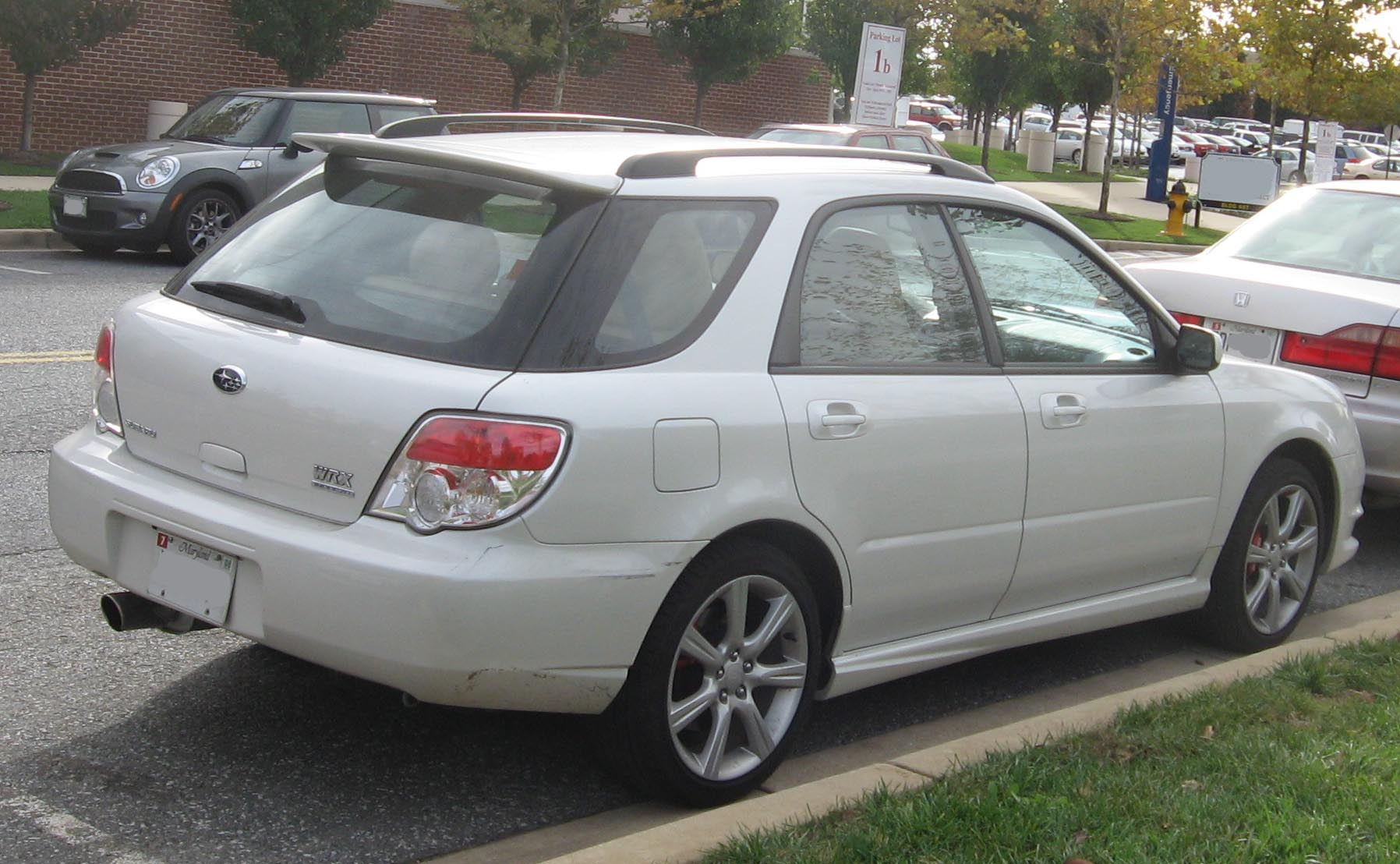
2006–2007 Subaru WRX wagon (US)

For 2006 the Subaru Impreza WRX received a complete front-end redesign, restyled headlights with smoke-tinted lenses, a three-section mesh-type grille, and distinguished new tail lamp clusters. Three trims levels are available: WRX TR (Tuner Ready), WRX, and Limited. The car's curb weight is 3,140 lb (1,424 kg) for the WRX TR, 3,192 lb (1,448 kg) for the WRX, and 3240 for the WRX Limited.

The biggest change was the 2.5-liter turbocharged intercooled EJ255 engine, producing 230 hp (172 kW) at 5600 rpm. It replaced the 2.0-liter EJ205 engine used since the WRX model's introduction. The larger-displacement engine produced 235 lb⋅ft (319 N⋅m) of peak torque at 3,600 rpm, compared to 217 lb⋅ft (294 N⋅m) at 4,000 rpm for the previous WRX. Performance was improved in all speed ranges, with greater emphasis on low-end and mid-range torque. The 2.5-liter WRX engine shared architecture and technology with the WRX STI engine, including Subaru Active Valve Control System (AVCS) variable valve timing and an Electronic Throttle Control system. The turbocharger remained the same unit as on the 2002–2005MY US-spec WRXs, but peaked at 14.8 psi (1.0 bar) of boost. The first gear in the transmission received dual-ring synchros to improve downshifts from 2nd to 1st and reduce notchiness.

2006 Impreza WRX models gained some chassis and braking system enhancements. On sedan models, aluminum front suspension lower A-arms reduced unsprung weight. (The rear suspension gained forward aluminum lateral links in the 2005 model year.) The steering rack was updated for improved steering feel and the steering rack ratio was changed to 15.0:1. On all WRX models, 7-spoke 17 in × 7 in (430 mm × 180 mm) aluminum-alloy wheels replaced the previous 5-spoke 16 in × 6.5 in (410 mm × 170 mm) wheels. Tires were 215/45ZR17 versus 205/55R16 before. The more powerful brake system employed 11.5 in (292 mm) vented front discs and four-piston calipers instead of the previous versions two-piston calipers. The rear brakes were 11.3 in (287 mm) ventilated discs replacing the previous 10.3 in (262 mm) solid discs, and two-piston calipers replacing single-piston calipers. The calipers are painted red with the SUBARU name in white overlain.

The US-spec STIs receive the same facelift as the Japanese-spec STIs. Mechanically speaking, the DCCD (Driver-Controlled Center Differential) and the engine mounts have been changed. Like the Japanese-spec STIs engine mounts were changed from metal to liquid-filled plastic mounts to reduce vibrations into the car's cabin. The manufacturer will replace them, under warranty, if broken, with the 2005 rubber and metal mounts. Later 2006 vehicles were equipped from the factory with 2005 mounts. The center differential is updated with the addition of a mechanical limited-slip mechanism to supplement the electromagnetic DCCD. The torque split is changed to 41/59. The oil pump within the transmission was also deleted. The 2006 STI weighs approximately 3,350 lb (1,520 kg).

A 2006 model WRX was famously featured in the opening scene of the 2017 film Baby Driver.

Applied G (2007)

Ikuo Mori takes the place of Kyoji Takenaka as president and CEO of Fuji Heavy Industries.

As a cost-cutting effort, the WRX has its aluminum suspension reverted to steel-cast pieces. The WRX and Limited trim levels receive an auxiliary audio port next to the cigarette lighter and MP3 CD playback.

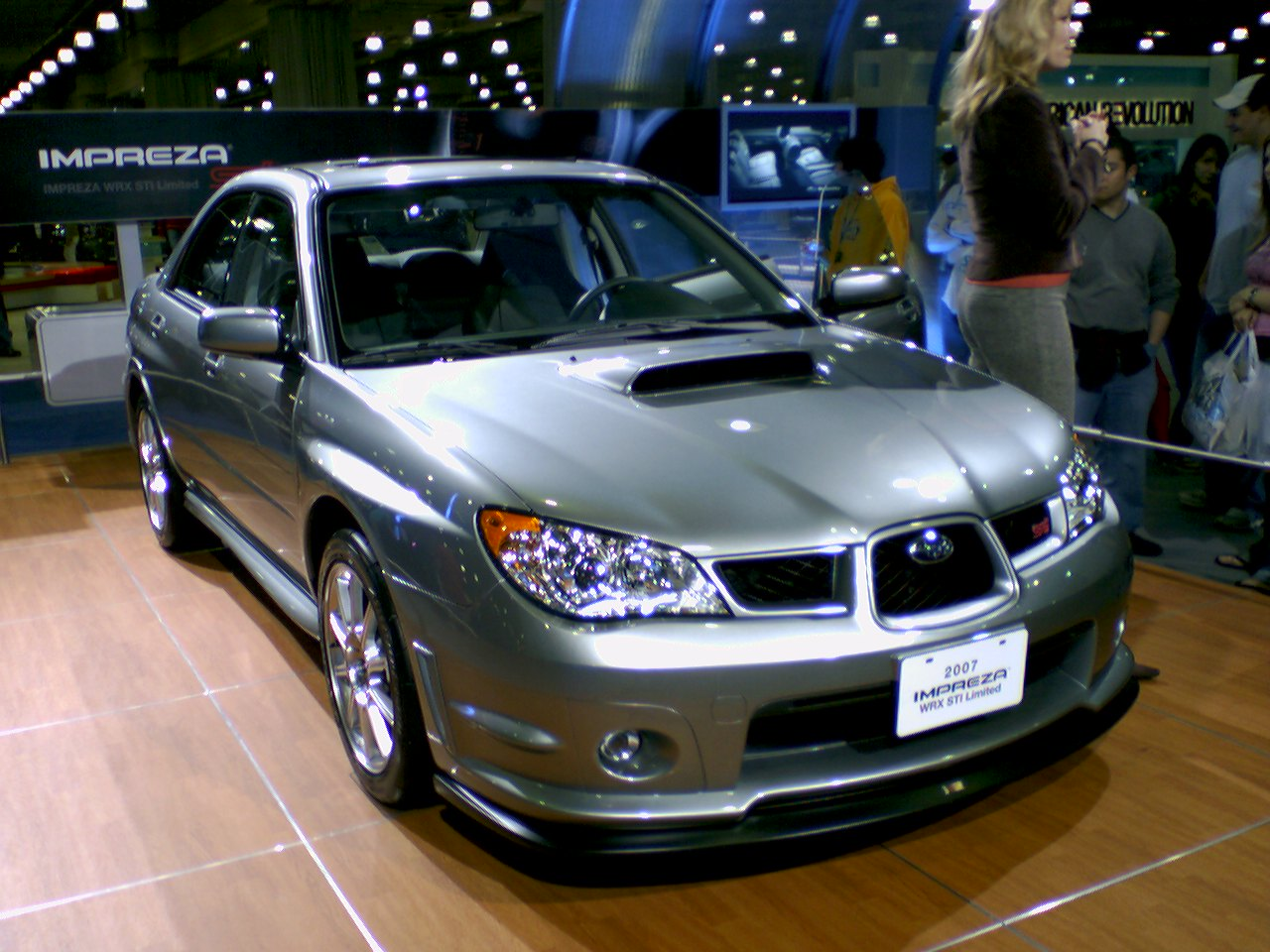
2007 US-spec Subaru Impreza WRX STi Limited. Only 800 were produced

In 2007, quite a number of changes were made to the US-spec STI. Due to Subaru's decision to reduce costs by cutting the amount of aluminum used, the US-spec STI no longer receives the J-spec Spec C control arms. The control arms are now the aluminum ones used on the Japan-spec revision A and B non-Spec C STis. The high caster angle has been reduced, which in turn reduces the wheelbase from 100 in (254 cm) to 99.4 in (252 cm). The rear sway bar has decreased in size from 20 mm (0.8 in) to 19 mm (0.7 in). The gear ratios of second, third and fourth gears have been made longer (higher ratio) in order to improve fuel economy and drivability, which inadvertently reduces 1/4 mile drag racing times due to the ability to trap 114 mph (183 km/h) in 4th gear, without the shift to 5th. The transmission oil pump that was deleted in the 2006 model year was also brought back for the 2007 model year transmission. The EJ257's cylinder heads have been redesigned to improve cooling, and the sodium-filled exhaust valves have been deleted. Pistons are the same as previous years. The alternator is changed from a 90A rating to 110 amps. The rear limited-slip differential is now a Torsen unit, considered an upgrade from the previous model's clutch type unit. The turbo has also been changed to the VF43, which has a different wastegate actuator than the VF39. The side cowl braces are stiffer than the 2006MY. The engine mounts are once again the hard rubber mounts used prior to 2006. On the interior, there is an audio jack that replaces the ashtray, a rear center armrest with trunk pass-through and a 120-watt audio system.

The STI's ECU was completely re-engineered in order to meet US LEV2 emissions requirements, which has caused throttle and timing issues. A secondary air pump was also added to help meet LEV2. Top Feed injectors replaced the Side Feed from the previous models.

The WRX STI Limited was introduced with fog lights, leather interior, lip trunk spoiler, and optional moonroof. It is similar to the Japan-spec WRX STI A-line, except the mechanicals of the car are based on the 2007MY US-spec WRX STI.

=== United Kingdom ===
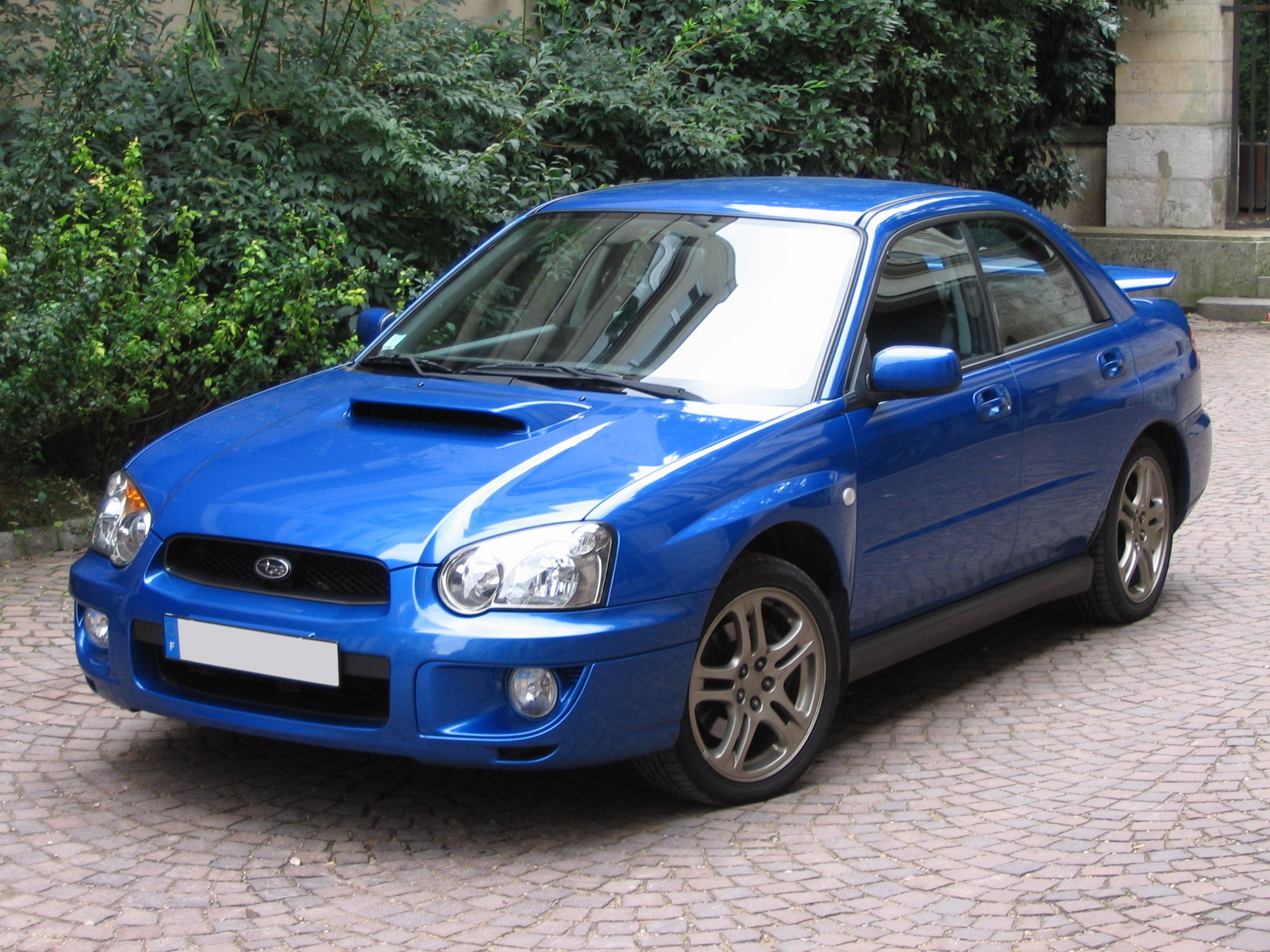
2005 Subaru Impreza WRX (Europe)

WRX UK300 (2001)

Subaru produced 300 examples of the UK300 to celebrate the rallying success in the UK from the previous years. It features 18 in (46 cm) Prodrive-OZ-wheels in gold, Pirelli Rosso P Zero Tyres, a blue Alcantara Interior or a blue leather option, UK300 floor mats, UK300 headlights, UK300 exclusive front and rear spoilers and UK300 decals.

WR1 (2004)

A limited edition of 1000 Japanese MY04 WRX STI's with DCCD was exported to celebrate victory in the 2003 WRC drivers' championship. 500 were sold in Europe, Australia and South Africa as the Petter Solberg edition; the other 500 were further modified by Prodrive and sold in the UK as the WR1. They had 320 bhp (239 kW) and 309.8 ft⋅lbf (420.0 N⋅m), a 0–60 mph (97 km/h) time of 4.25 seconds and a top speed of 155 mph (249 km/h) (electronically limited). They were equipped with Prodrive WRX STI springs, Pirelli PZero Nero tires, mesh grilles, special Ice Blue metallic paint and Prodrive PFF7 Pewter wheels. The new ECU and exhaust were not EU-homologated, so they were fitted after registering the car.

WRX 300 (2005)

300 vehicles limited to the UK market were sold with Blue Mica exterior paint, 17" gold alloy wheels with 215/45 tires, Subaru World Rally Team branded front bucket seats, a 5-speed manual transmission and the Prodrive Performance Package (PPP) all as standard equipment. The Performance Package increased power to 265 PS (195 kW; 261 hp) and 348 N⋅m (257 lb⋅ft) torque and equipped the car with a 0–60 mph (97 km/h) time of 4.8 seconds and a top speed of 151 mph (243 km/h). 12 months' free subscription to RAC Trackstar was included in the basic on the road price of £21495.00 (approx. $31800). Considering that the total on the road price of the standard non-limited edition Prodrive Performance Pack equipped Impreza WRX was £21900.00, the WRX 300 represented very good value for money. Optional extras included an 18" P-FF7 wheel and tire package, a Prodrive brake upgrade (front brakes only), a sports suspension upgrade and a special edition rear spoiler.

RB320 (2006)

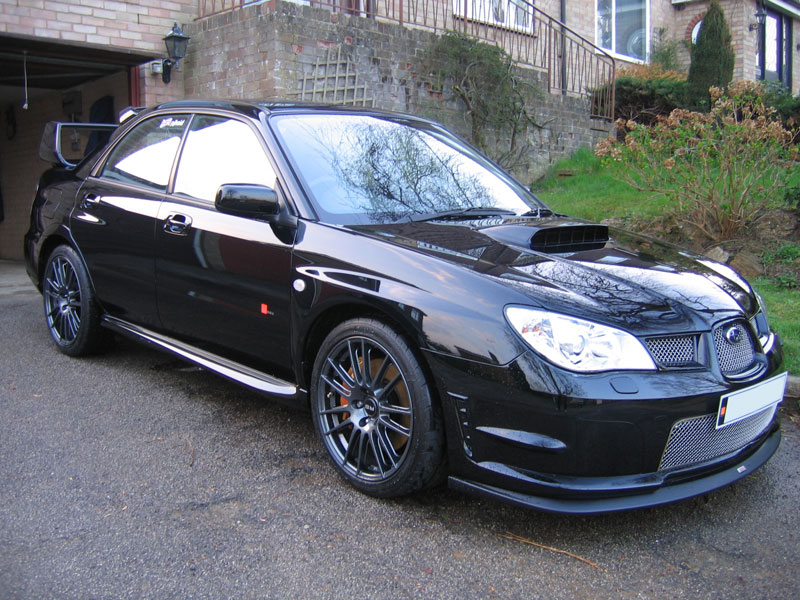
Subaru Impreza RB320

In 2006, Subaru UK released the limited edition Subaru Impreza RB320 in honor of the late Richard Burns, who died in 2005 from cancer. Richard won the 2001 WRC Drivers Championship for SWRT.

The RB320 was available only in Obsidian Black, and also features bespoke 18 in (46 cm) alloy wheels and specially developed Prodrive suspension using Bilstein dampers, a sports spring kit with revised rear anti-roll bar and a ride height lowered by 30 mm (1.2 in) at the front and 10 mm (0.4 in) at the rear.

Also standard was a chrome mesh front grille, front lip spoiler, short throw shifter, side sill plates and RB320-branded gear knob, carpet mats and exclusive exterior badging. Each owner will also receive an individually numbered black alloy tax disc holder.

The Prodrive Performance Pack (PPP) boosts power to 320 PS (235 kW; 316 hp) at 6,000 rpm and torque to 332 lb⋅ft (450 N⋅m) at 3,700 rpm. This reduces the 0–60 mph (97 km/h) time to 4.8 seconds and the 0–100 mph (161 km/h) time to 12.2 seconds.

Spec D (2006)

A 'discreet' version of the STI was made for a more conservative market. It is similar to the Japanese-spec A-Line except it had a regular WRX spoiler on the boot, silver wheels (not Gold) and no rear roof vane. As standard, it has projector-style fog lights, Smartnav with touch screen operation, Vehicle Tracker, and safe speed system. A 200W Pioneer DEH-P70BT head unit, iPod adapter and Bluetooth phone connection were also included. The interior featured standard leather trim on the seats and doors, Auto climate control and extra sound insulation. It was limited to a run of 300 cars in only Crystal Grey Metallic so therefore is even rarer than the RB320. Power on this model is rated at 276 bhp (206 kW). It has a 0–60 mph (97 km/h) time of 5 seconds and a top speed of 155 mph (249 km/h) (electronically limited). New retail price was £28,450.

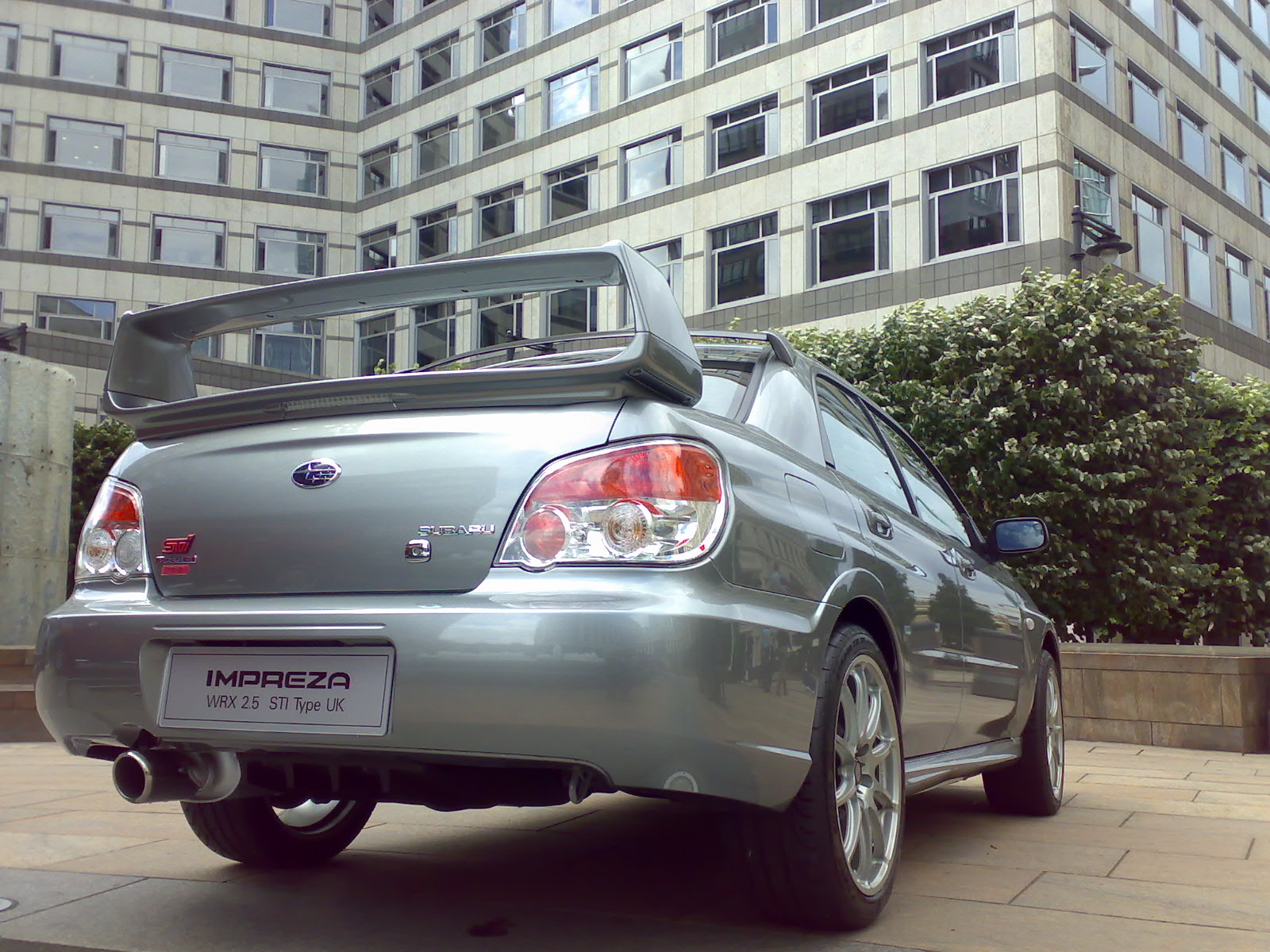
The UK version of the WRX STI

GB270 (2007)

Subaru produced only 400 cars; 300 4dr saloon versions and 100 5dr hatchback models. The GB270 was available in either WR Blue Mica (4dr) or Urban Grey Metallic (5dr). The name was derived from the 2.5-liter turbocharged engine which produced 270 PS (199 kW; 266 hp) and 420 N⋅m (310 lb⋅ft) of torque. These upgrades meant a 0-60 mph (97 km/h) time of 4.9 seconds and a top speed of 146 mph (235 km/h). The top speed of the GB270 was slightly lower than that of other Imprezas because it features a Prodrive Quickshift 5-speed gearbox that offered faster gearshifts compared to the standard 6-speed gearbox.

Prodrive fitted their upgraded suspension system, lowering height of the car by 30 mm (1 in) in the front and 10 mm (0 in) in the rear.

A Prodrive anti-roll bar, Prodrive polished stainless-steel mesh front grille, a set of bespoke 18 inches (46 cm) Prodrive alloy wheels – Silver on four door, Black on five door were included in the £22,995 on the road price.

== Saab 9-2X ==
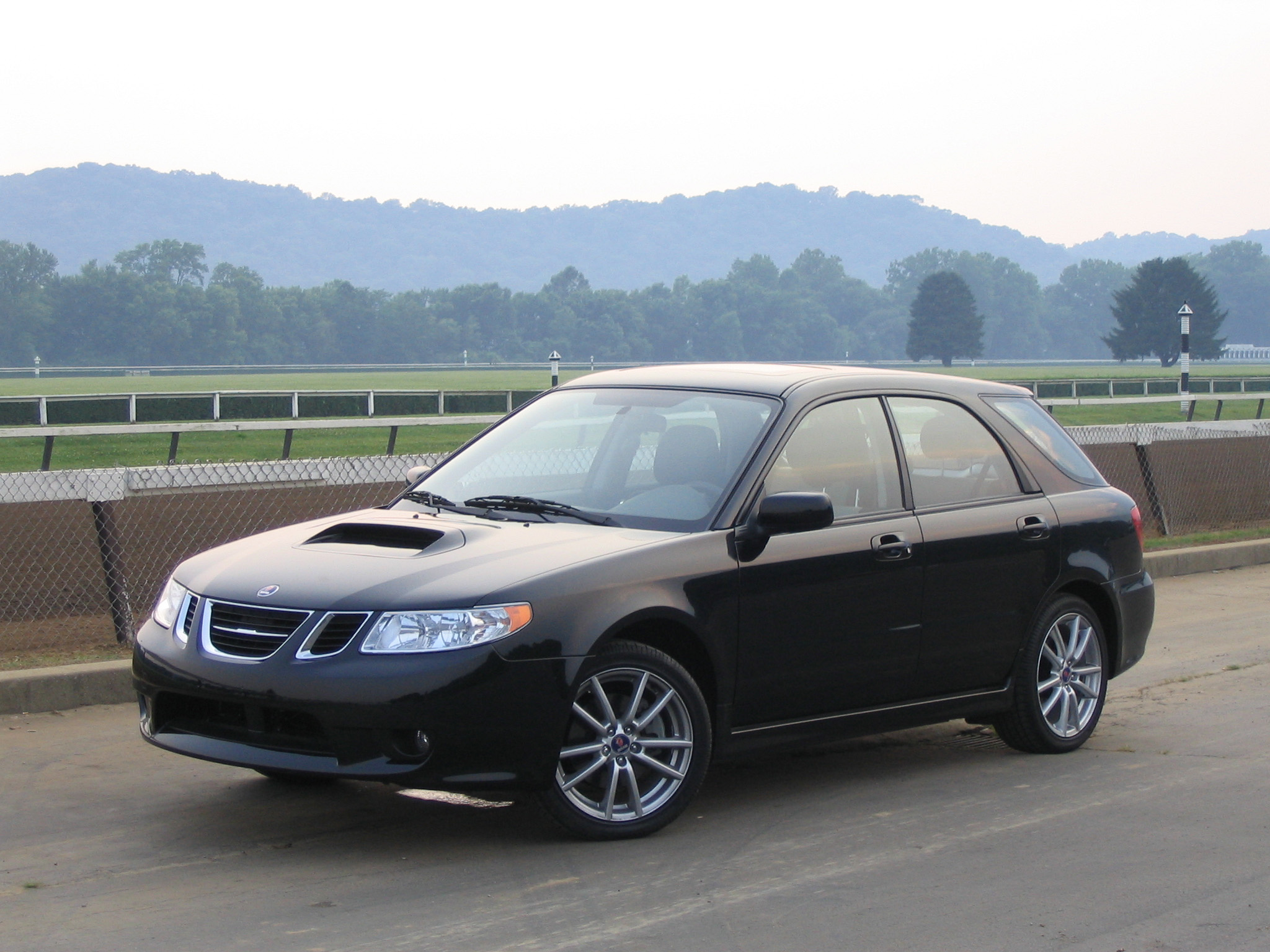
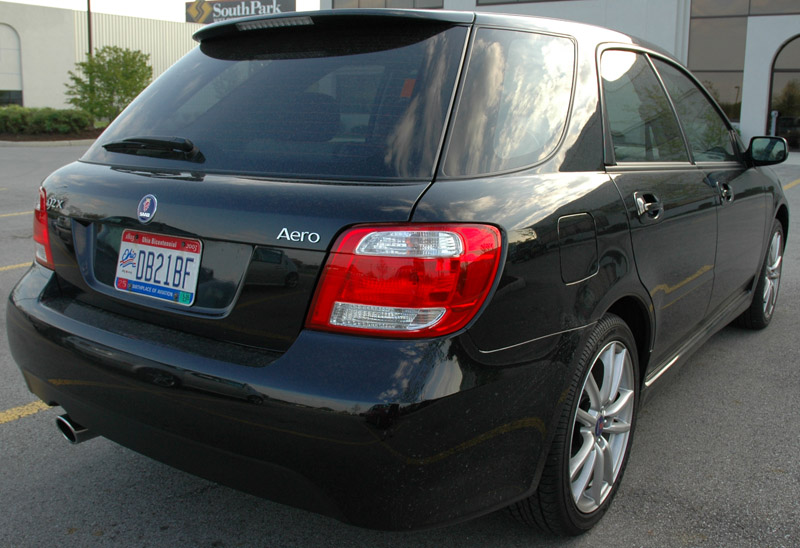
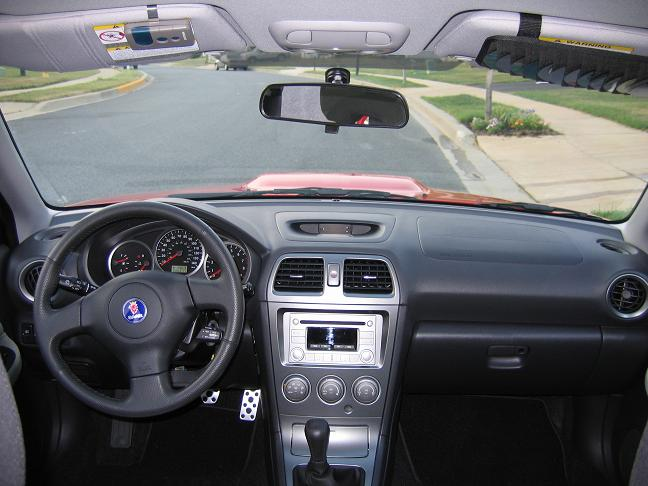
Saab 9-2X Aero

Subaru manufactured a badge engineered version of the second generation Impreza hatchback, marketed by Saab as the Saab 9-2X (stylized as 9^{2X}), in the North American market for 2005–2006 model years. At the time, Saab Automobile had been a fully owned subsidiary of General Motors (GM), and GM held a 20 percent stake of Subaru's parent company, Fuji Heavy Industries. The 9-2X was nicknamed the "Saabaru", a portmanteau of "Saab" and "Subaru".

Saab redesigned the front and rear exterior styling of the car to integrate it with Saab's overall brand design language. Revisions included modified front fascia, fenders, hood, tailgate and rear fascia. The interior received extra acoustic insulation over the Subaru, with particular attention paid to the firewall, carpeting, roof, and rear window seals. The majority of the interior of the 9-2X is identical to the Impreza wagon. Saab offered a two-tone seat design based on the earlier (second generation) Impreza wagon, as well as the instrument cluster from that car. 2005 was the first year all-wheel drive was offered by Saab. All-wheel drive was standard on both the 9-2X and the 9-7X.

Saab also specified their own front seats incorporating active head restraints, unlike the fixed headrest seats in the equivalent Impreza WRX. The rear suspension arms are aluminum, with further reduction of unsprung weight achieved by using plastic in place of heavier components, bushings unique to the Saab, and recalibrated dampers. The steering had been made more responsive and exact in the Aero by using the 2006-2007 Impreza WRX steering rack, which features a faster 15.5:1 steering ratio, more rigidly mounted steering hardware, and stiffer chassis bushings.

The 9-2X is not particularly popular with Saab brand loyalists because the changes from the Subaru are mostly cosmetic. The 9-2X also won the highest IIHS safety awards.

In October 2005, however, GM decided that it would sell 8.4 percent of the company to Toyota and dispose of its remaining 11.4 percent share back to Fuji in a share buyback deal. The 9-2X was discontinued after the 2006 model year with the dissolution of the partnership between Fuji and GM.

10,346 Saab 9-2Xs were manufactured during the production run, with 8,514 for 2005 and 1,832 for the 2006 model year. Saab offered the 2005 model year 9-2X with Subaru's naturally aspirated 2.5-liter EJ253 engine in the "Linear" trim level (165 hp (123 kW) and 166 lb⋅ft (225 N⋅m)), with the turbocharged 2.0-liter engine shared with the Impreza WRX offered in the "Aero" badged model (227 hp (169 kW) and 217 lb⋅ft (294 N⋅m)). All-wheel drive came standard with an optional four-speed automatic transmission available instead of the five-speed manual for both trims.

For 2005, Saab offered three options packages. The Premium package added leather upholstery and for the US model, xenon HID headlamps. When ordered on with the "Linear" trim, the Premium package also included the in-dash six-CD changer, front fog lamps, vinyl door cards, and a leather-wrapped steering wheel and shift knob. The Cold Weather package added heated front seats, side view mirror defoggers, and front/rear wiper defrosters where the wipers park. In Canada, cars equipped with the Cold Weather package also included an engine block heater. The Sport package added a sunroof, and for the "Aero" only, included 17-inch wheels.

2006 model year

Updates for the 2006 model year included the re-branding of the "Linear" to "2.5i", with its 2.5-liter engine upgraded to 173 hp (129 kW) and 166 lb⋅ft (225 N⋅m). The Aero's 2.0-liter turbocharged engine made way for the higher-displacement 2.5-liter EJ255 turbocharged unit, increasing outputs to 230 hp (172 kW) and 235 lb⋅ft (319 N⋅m). For 2006, the cars had different options packages that essentially broke down the same equipment differently. The premium package became known as the leather package and incorporated the same additions as previously. The cold weather package also remained unchanged. However, the sport package, with its upgraded 17-inch wheel upgrade package, became exclusive to the Aero as the sunroof became a standalone option.
