= Shift light =

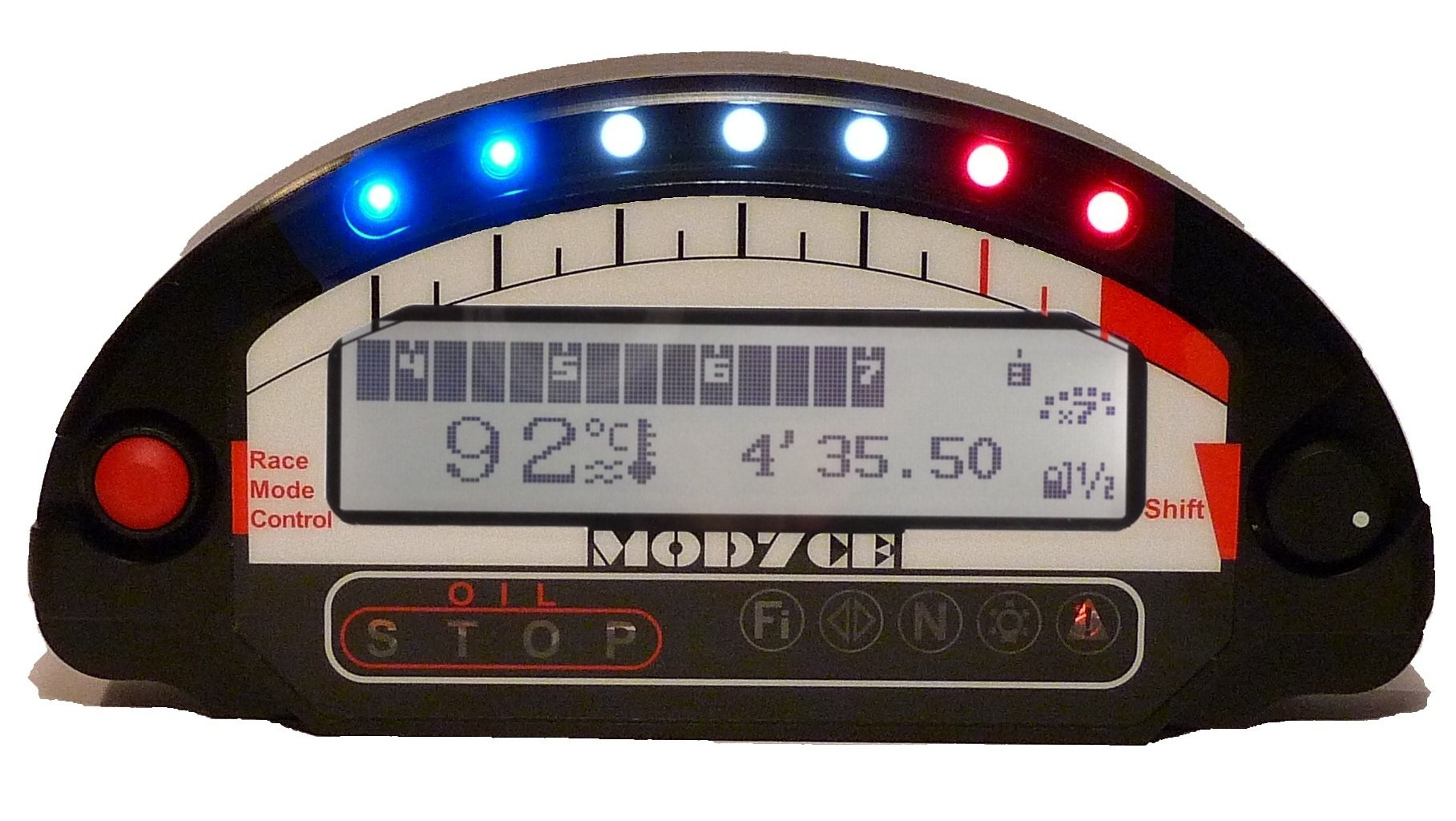
A digital dash and data acquisition system for car and motorcycle racing incorporating LED shift lights.

A shift light is a warning lamp fitted to vehicles in order to indicate to the driver that maximum revolutions per minute (r/min) has almost been reached. Ideally a shift lamp will illuminate at the engine speed beyond that which delivers the maximum power, measured in for example kilowatt (kW) or brake horsepower (bhp), such that the power before and after shifting is the same. Accelerating the engine beyond this point is not conducive to ideal acceleration. In use a shift light allows the driver to judge the exact point that a gear change should be carried out without having to glance down at the tachometer. This also increases safety for the driver by keeping their focus near the track at all times.

Beginning in the early 1980s, many United States-market vehicles equipped with a manual transmission began to have shift lights as standard equipment; these would usually signal for an upshift at an engine speed that provided maximum fuel efficiency, lower than the ideal engine speed for maximum power. When EPA fuel economy testing rules stipulated that shift lights would be followed when available, fuel economy appeared better if a shift light was installed. Some in the 1980s had buzzers to alert the driver when a certain r/min was reached.

Towards the late 1980s and early 1990s, shift lights saw uses in multiple motorsport disciplines, such as Formula One, to signal for an upshift at an engine speed which provided optimal power within the torque curve, ensuring optimum acceleration.
