= Subaru Legacy (first generation) =

First generation of Subaru Legacy

Legacy BC-BJ-BF Series
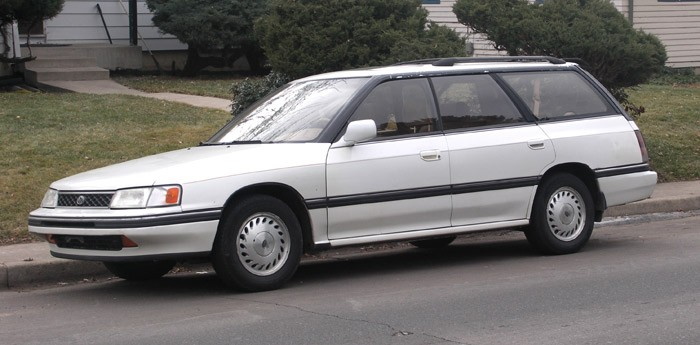

Overview
- Manufacturer: Subaru (Fuji Heavy Industries)
- Model code: BC/BJ/BF
- Also called: Isuzu Aska CX; Subaru Liberty (Australia)
- Production: 1989–1994
- Designer: Kiyoshi Sugimoto (1987)

Body and chassis
- Class: Mid-size car
- Body style: 4-door pillar hardtop sedan 5-door station wagon
- Layout: FF layout standard F4 layout optional
- Related: Group A Subaru Legacy RS

Powertrain
- Engine: 1.6 L EJ16 H4; 1.8 L EJ18 H4; 2.0 L EJ20E H4; 2.0 L EJ20D DOHC H4; 2.0 L EJ20G DOHC turbo H4; 2.2 L EJ22/E H4; 2.2 L EJ22T turbo H4
- Transmission: 4-speed automatic 5-speed manual 5-speed manual with dual range

Dimensions
- Wheelbase: 2,580 mm (101.6 in)
- Length: 1993–94 Sedan: 4,540 mm (178.9 in); 1993–94 Wagon: 4,620 mm (181.9 in); 1990–92 Wagon: 4,600 mm (181.1 in); 1990–92 Sedan: 4,510 mm (177.6 in)
- Width: 1,690 mm (66.5 in)
- Height: 1993–94 Wagon: 1,390 mm (54.7 in); 1993–94 LS & LSi Wagon: 1,430 mm (56.3 in); 1990–92 Wagon: 1,420 mm (55.9 in); 1990–92 AWD Wagon: 1,440 mm (56.7 in); 1990–92 Sedan: 1,380 mm (54.3 in); 1990–93 AWD Sedan: 1,400 mm (55.1 in); 1993–94 Sedan: 1,360 mm (53.5 in)
- Curb weight: 1,460 kg (3,220 lb) max

Chronology
- Successor: Subaru Legacy (second generation); Subaru Impreza WRX STI (RS models)

The first generation Subaru Legacy is a mid-size family car / wagon developed by Fuji Heavy Industries. The Legacy was an all new model, and was considered a notable departure from Subaru products in the past.

== History ==
The worldwide introduction of the Legacy sedan and wagon was achieved in 1989. Subaru had earned a reputation of building vehicles that were regarded as "quirky" while other Asian manufacturers were bringing more upscale and conventional appearing models to the market. The Legacy was different and became a solid production that changed Subaru's reputation. The Legacy appeared at the same time as the US introduction of Lexus and Infiniti and five years after Acura, and it was interpreted by some as Subaru's attempt at participating in the emerging imported luxury car market. However, Subaru did not have a V6 or V8 engine. The Legacy was more automotive aerodynamic than previously built products, with soft edges and a more coherent appearance. The sedan has a break in the beltline where it drops down from the windshield to the front door glass, and then juts up from the rear door glass to the rear window, and the beltline is interrupted as it transitions down to the rear window on the wagon. The beltline treatment was used again on the SVX when it was introduced in 1992.

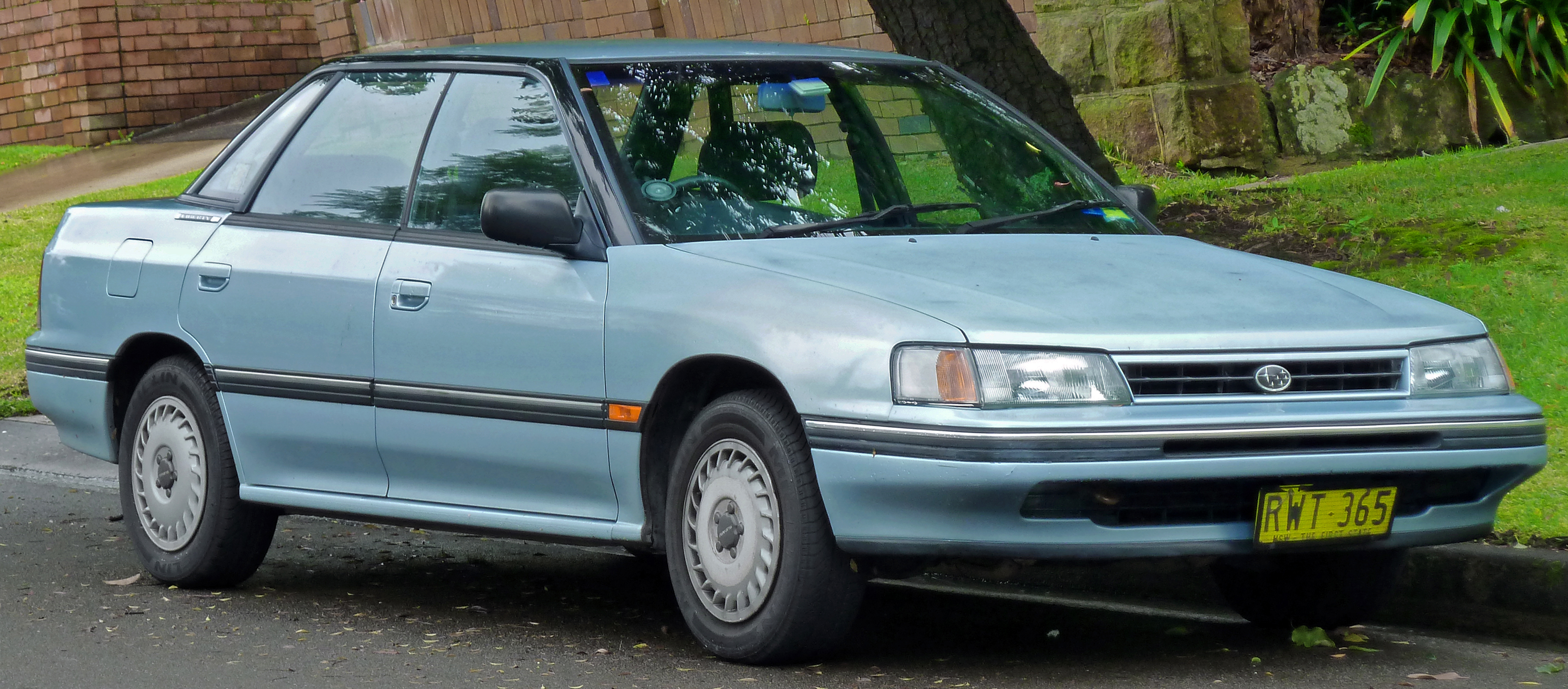
1989–1991 Subaru Liberty LX sedan

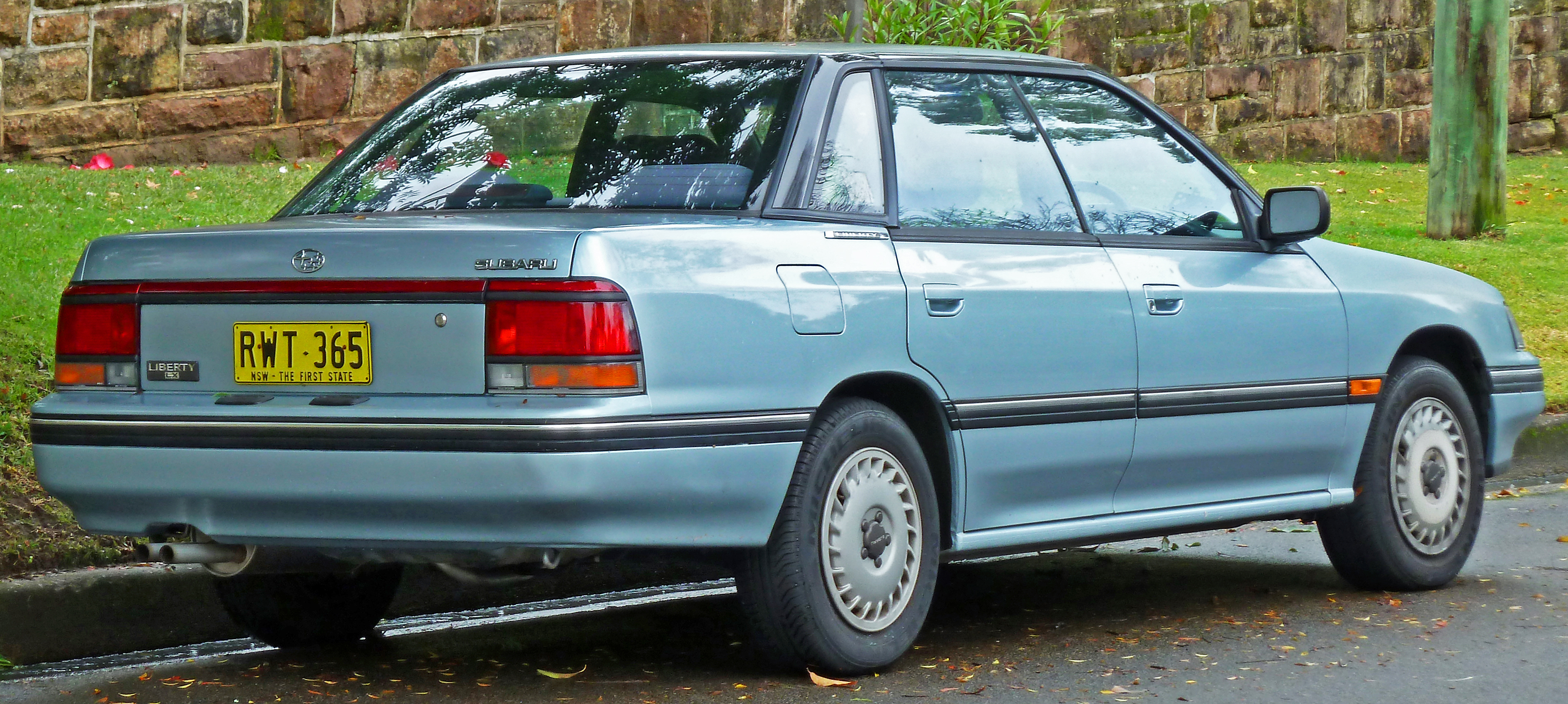
1989–1991 Subaru Liberty LX sedan

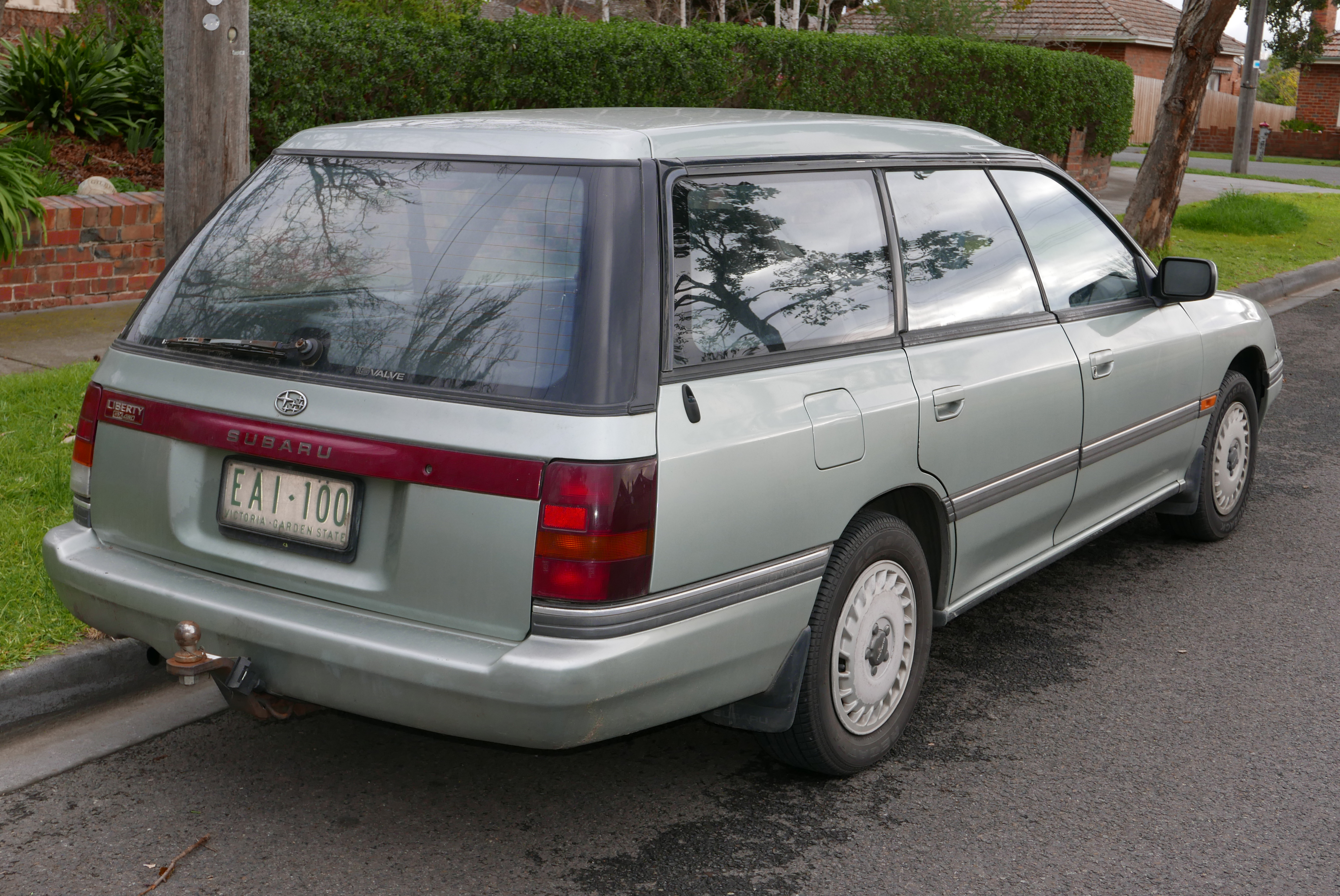
1989–1991 Subaru Legacy GX 4WD wagon

The Legacy broke with many Subaru traditions, such as no longer locating the spare tire in the engine compartment, behind the engine and above the transmission, a tradition started with the 1966 Subaru 1000, a method also used in the Citroën GS. The Legacy was also the second Subaru to use wheels with five lug nuts instead of four to better cope with the increased horsepower and torque from the powertrain. The Legacy was an all-new model, and was slotted at the top in Subaru's model range, joining the Leone, the Subaru XT coupé, Subaru Justy sub-compact, and the Subaru Rex and Subaru Sambar kei cars in Japan.

The Subaru star badge used since the introduction of the 360 was modified, with a more conventional and stylized appearance, in comparison to versions used on previous vehicles.

The Legacy began with a four-door sedan or five-door wagon bodystyles with FWD and an optional full-time AWD package, and was introduced in the United States, UK, Germany, the Benelux region of Northern Europe, Argentina, Chile, Japan, Australia (where it was called Liberty because the name Legacy conflicted with Legacy Australia) and New Zealand. The car was built with many luxury and technological advancements normally found on more expensive vehicles as standard equipment, such as power windows, central locking, fuel injection, air conditioning, vehicle speed sensitive, variable effort, power assist rack-and-pinion steering, alloy wheels, 4-wheel independent suspension (MacPherson struts in front and rear) with both negative scrub and anti-dive and squat geometery, anti-sway bars front and rear, and all-wheel disc brakes. Items that were optional that didn't make the vehicle too expensive were four-channel ABS, licensed from Bosch and air suspension height control, which lowered the vehicle at speeds above 50 mph (80 km/h), and also allowed the driver to increase the vehicles ground clearance for off-road conditions. In many markets, only four-wheel-drive models were sold, or a very limited front-wheel-drive lineup.

On vehicles equipped with power central locking, the feature is activated from the inside drivers door lock switch only, by pushing the rocker switch to lock or unlock all doors. There is no label on any of the doors that suggest the door lock function is electric. Other doors can be locked or unlocked individually by pushing the respective door lock rocker switch, but it will not lock or unlock the other doors. The outside key door lock can unlock the drivers door only by turning the key partially, or with a complete turn to the left to unlock all doors.

== Japanese models ==
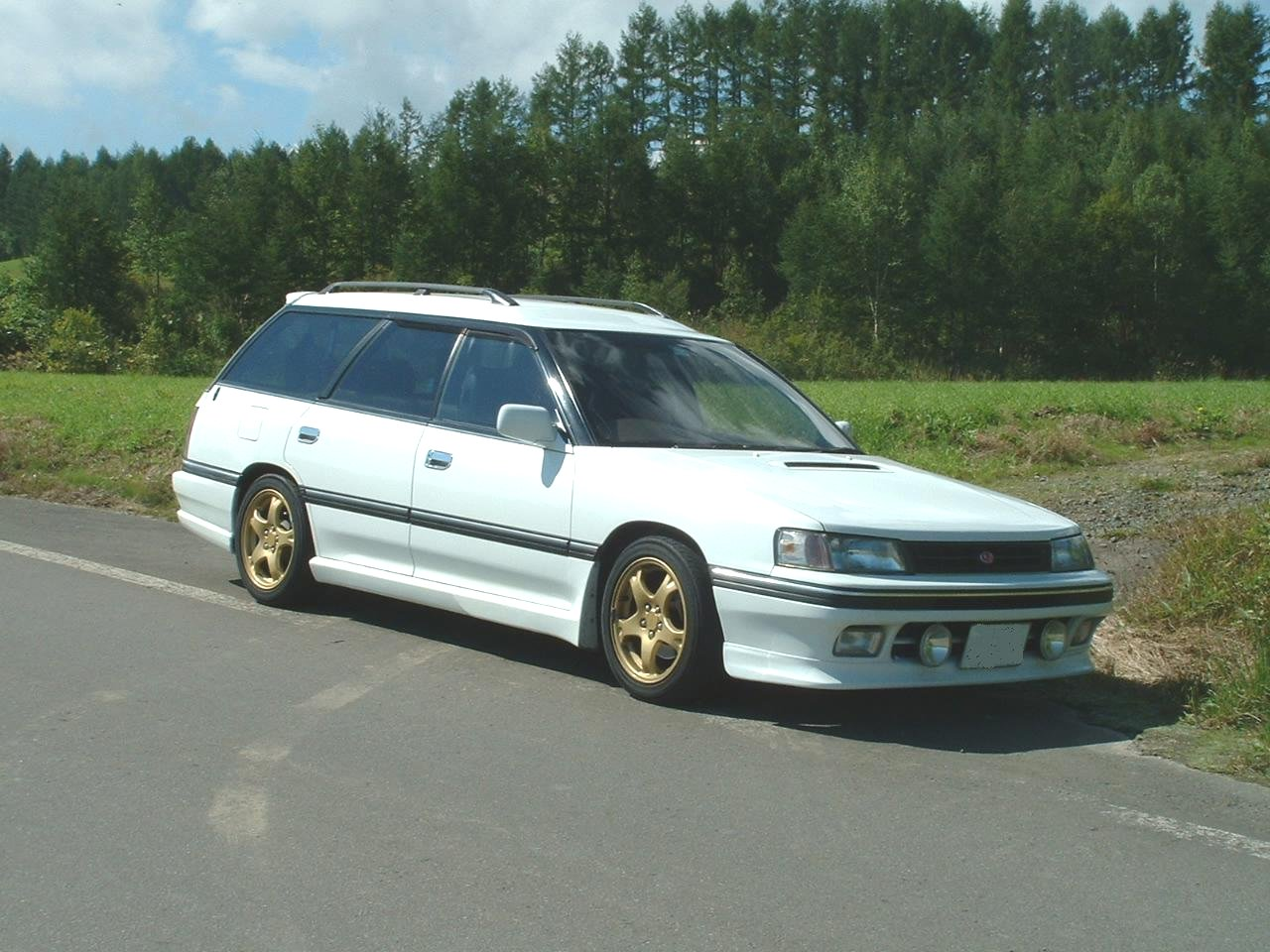
1991 Subaru Legacy GT Touring Wagon

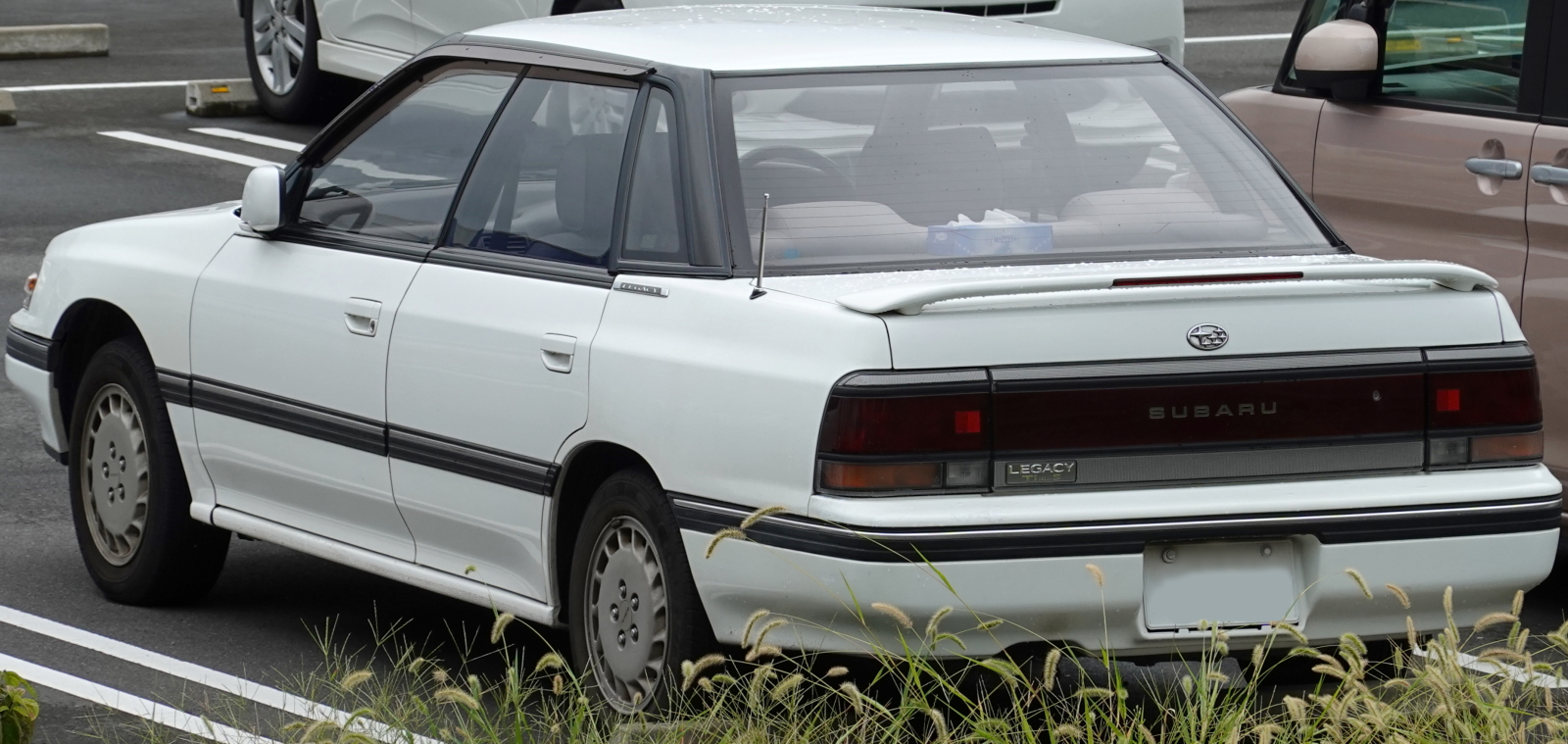
Legacy Ti

When the Legacy was first introduced February 1, 1989 in Japan, the Legacy came in the following trim levels: the 220 PS (162 kW) DOHC 2.0-liter turbocharged "RS" with a 5-speed manual transmission only, followed by the "VZ" sedan and wagon and the "TZ" sedan and wagon with the 150 PS (110 kW) DOHC 2.0-liter engine. A smaller 102 PS (75 kW) SOHC 1.8-liter engine was used for the "Vi" sedan and wagon with FWD only, "Ti" sedan and wagon, the "Mi" and the entry level "Ei" sedans and wagons. The fuel efficiency for the 2.0-liter engine (non-turbo, manual transmission 4WD) is 10.8 km/L (31 mpg_{‑imp}; 25 mpg_{‑US}) based on Japanese Government emissions tests using 10 different modes of scenario standards, and 18 km/L (51 mpg_{‑imp}; 42 mpg_{‑US}) at speeds consistently maintained at 60 km/h (37.3 mph), based on figures listed in the Japanese sales brochure.

All wagons available to the Japanese were the extended roof version, referred to as the "Touring Wagon", and the air suspension, called "EP-S" (electronic pneumatic-suspension), was only available on the AWD equipped VZ wagon with an automatic transmission. In 1990, the 200 PS (147 kW) DOHC 2.0-liter turbocharged Legacy "GT" sedan/extended roof wagon was introduced, with a 4-speed computer-controlled automatic transmission only on the GT sedan and a choice of automatic or manual transmission on the wagon, as well as the slightly more affordable "RS type R" turbocharged sedan. The GT sedan/wagon, the RS, and RS type R came with 15-inch alloy wheels and 205/60R15 tires, dual piston brake calipers front and single piston rear, and a sport-tuned suspension over the standard wheel size of 14-inch steel wheels for the other models offered. Plastic wheel covers were not offered on the entry level "Ei" sedan or wagon, and the 13-inch wheel was painted silver instead of black.

The "Ti type S" sedan and wagon, introduced in 1991, were offered with items available on the more expensive VZ and TZ but with the smaller 1.8 engine. The reason for this was it allowed Japanese buyers to purchase the higher equipped models while avoiding the higher cost of Japan's annual road tax, where the 2.0 litre engine had a higher tax amount. The AWD setup, called "Active Torque Split" in Japanese language brochures, was standard on the Japanese-spec GT and RS, optional on the other trim levels with either a manual or automatic transmission. A partial 4WD system was offered on the lower trim level "Mi" and "Ei" sedans and wagons with a manual transmission only, activated by an embedded switch on top of the gear shift lever. A glass moonroof was not available until 1990 on both the GT and VZ sedan and wagon.

At the Legacy's introduction, the top level VZ sedan interior was originally available in blue, gray or a special color combination of pearl white exterior paint with dark red upholstery and brown interior plastic, with the other sedans and wagons offering interior color choices of blue or gray. The VZ wagon that was painted black came with light gray two-tone paint scheme on the lower half of the vehicle, and both front and rear bumper covers below the bumper rub strip, which was later used when the Outback was introduced with the Second Generation. Blue interior was offered on vehicles with blue exterior paint only. When model year 1990 arrived, however, the interior color choices were reduced to gray for the entire product line, with various types of upholstery selections, including a choice of velour, moquette, or tricot cloth upholstery based on the trim level. Leather was optional on the GT sedan and wagon only. A four spoke, black leather covered MOMO steering wheel also came with the Japanese-spec GT sedan/wagon and the RS sedan, and was affixed with six allen head screws to an adapter hub that incorporated the cruise control activation switch. This arrangement allowed the exchange of other aftermarket steering wheels using a six screw installation pattern to suit personal tastes. The black leather steering wheel accompanied matching black leather on the gearshift, center armrest cover, and parking brake handle. The upper half of the dashboard on the 1990 RS was available with an optional blue color, with the rest of the dashboard and interior in gray only. The RS and RS type R interior color was black with black cloth upholstery with matching door panels and extended side bolsters on the front seats, covered in an upholstery pattern insert unique to the RS and RS type R. Japanese models have been known to be exported to countries with right-hand driving requirements, such as the UK, India, Australia and New Zealand.

=== Type R & RA ===
The Legacy RS Type R & RA were limited edition models. The Type R was released in February 1989 and featured harder rate springs, damper and bushings, three spoke steering MOMO "COBRA" steering wheel, Advan "GROVA" tyres and the removal of the power steering assist switch (present on the RS). Subaru stated the Type R was "a basic grade model of RS which is suitable as the material of a competition car for motor sports"

Subaru Technica International (STi) prepared four Legacy RS models with stronger drivetrains, stiffer suspensions, a deep front air dam, roll cage, and a quick-fill long-range fuel tank. In January 1989, STi took the cars to the Arizona Test Center, an oval track in the Phoenix desert and under the supervision of the FIA, the cars ran for over 18 days, accumulating 100,000 kilometers and set a speed record of 138.78 mph.

STi used its World Speed Endurance Record experience to produce its first car, the Legacy RS Type RA. Launched in November 1989, it was visually identical to the regular RS aside from decals on the front doors reading “Handcrafted tuning by STi” and rear badging. Mechanically however, the Type RA received many of the modifications on the record attempt cars.

Upgrades included forged pistons, strengthened connecting rods, hand finished intake and exhaust ports, balanced crankshaft and flywheel and an additional fan on the radiator. Suspension was retuned, and a quicker ratio power steering was added. Available only in Ceramic White, this first series of the RS Type RA was limited to only 100 units.

May 1990 saw the second series Type RA released with the addition of a close-ratio transmission added. With the 1991 facelift and update across the Legacy range, the third series Type RA received a 16-bit ECU, improved mid-range torque, and colour change to Feather White. The final series was marked by availability of Black Mica in addition to white. Total production of the Type RA was approx 700 units between.

The following was printed, in English, on the front cover of the 1989 Japanese Legacy brochure, as Subaru was proud of their new car:

As its name implies, the Legacy represents a culmination of Subaru's automotive technology. The engineering and design of this elegantly modern 2-liter sedan will set new standards for automotive excellence the world over. Performance, function and quality are the hallmarks of a great sedan. To these we have added that fun-to-drive feeling unique to Subaru. The Legacy; the more time you spend with it, the more you will appreciate it.

== International models ==
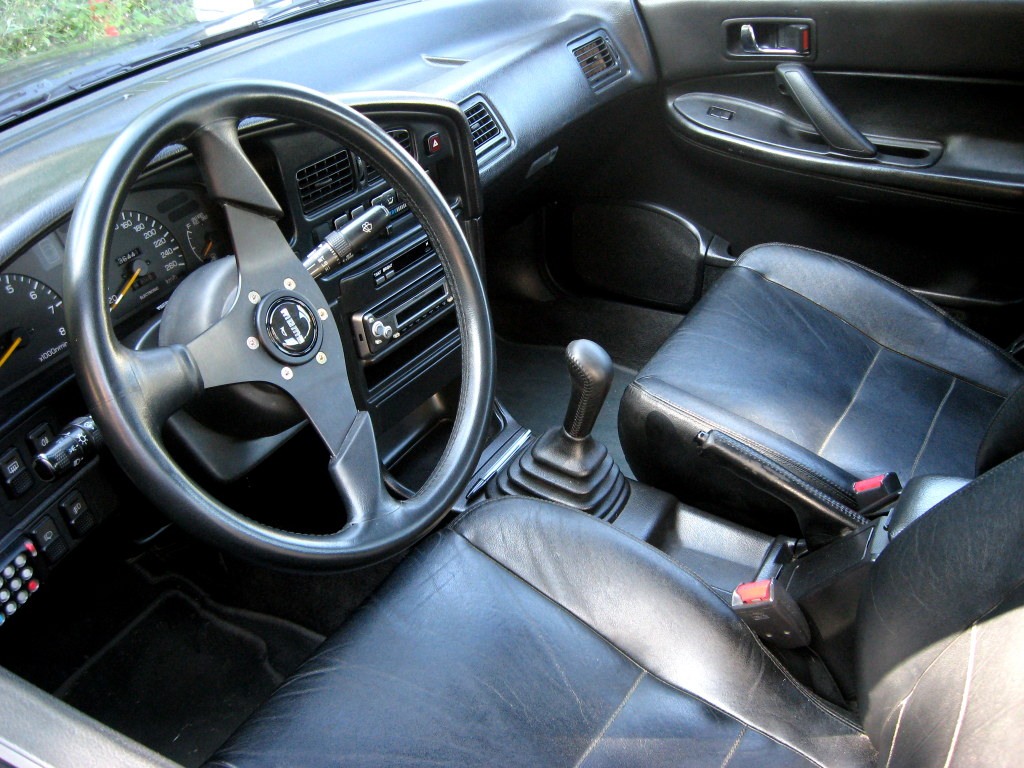
1992–1994 Subaru Legacy Turbo (Euro spec with MOMO steering wheel)

The European, British and Australian versions were offered with three trim levels; the upscale GX, the more affordable LX in Australia called the GL in Europe and the UK, and the very basic DL in parts of Europe, with AWD offered as an option on the GX, LX and GL. In Europe and the UK, the GL and DL came with the 1.8-liter engine and the GX came with the larger 2.2-liter engine. For the 1990 model year, the British-spec. 1.8 GL was equipped with a carburetor and rear drum brakes but were later upgraded to single point fuel injection for the 1991 model year. The DL wasn't available in the UK or Australia. The British were also given a choice of vehicles equipped with a catalytic converter that restricted fuel usage to unleaded fuel only. The Australians could choose between the SOHC 2.2-liter no turbo on the GX and LX or the DOHC 2.0-liter with a turbo on the RS. In 1992, the Australia market offered the Liberty RS turbo as a sedan or extended roof wagon with a manual transmission only. When the Japanese-spec turbo was offered in Europe and Australia, the black leather covered MOMO steering wheel was also offered. The steering wheel was affixed with six allen head screws to an adapter hub that incorporated the cruise control activation switch, if cruise control was installed. This arrangement allowed the exchange of other aftermarket steering wheels using a six screw installation pattern to suit personal tastes. The black leather steering wheel accompanied matching black leather on the gearshift, center armrest cover, and parking brake handle. The main difference from the Japanese market MOMO steering wheel and the European and Australian version was the Japanese version was four spoke.

The European, British and Australian versions came with two interior color choices of blue or gray. European upholstery fabric selections of tweed, tricot or textile cloth were particular to the individual trim level; tweed for the GX, tricot for the GL and textile for the DL. The British GL was offered with either the tricot or textile upholstery based on the exterior paint color chosen. Velour upholstery was offered instead of tweed on the Australian GX. The European and Australian versions were also available as a limited, premium editions, called GX Gala in Europe, and GX Heritage in Australia offering gray leather on the Euro-spec sedans and extended roof wagons, and only on the sedan for the Australian-spec Liberty Heritage. The European DL, which was very similar to the Japanese-spec Ei model, was very basic; items that weren't offered were a tachometer, power windows and central locking, a radio, individual 60:40 rear folding seatbacks on the sedan, and AWD was not available on the DL. The Euro-spec DL also didn't have plastic wheel covers, and instead was identical to the Japanese-spec Ei, with silver painted steel wheels and a silver plastic lug nut cover. The European DL also didn't have paint on the front or rear bumper covers, and remained in their natural state of black plastic.

The Latin-American spec DL also didn't have plastic wheel covers, was sold with silver painted steel wheels and a silver plastic lug nut cover. Also didn't have paint on the front or rear bumper covers, and remained in their natural state of black plastic; the engine offered on basic DLs and some GLs was the carbureted version from the EJ18, which came with a Hitachi carburetor and a Mitsubishi distributor, from factory. The Latin-American markets had the dual range 5 speed manual transmissions, as optional equipment.

The European, British and Australian wagons were also available with a dual-range manual transmission, not offered in the United States or Japan (although seven dual range Legacy wagons were imported to the United States as showroom models, before official sales of the Legacy started). In Germany, the extended roof wagon was called the Super Station and was available with either the 2.2 or 1.8-liter engine, ABS brakes were available only on German vehicles with the 2.2-liter engine, and the standard wagon was called the Legacy Station with a 1.8-liter engine only. Subarus were not officially sold in France until February 1992. Fuel efficiency ratings for European models (2.2L, non-turbo, 4WD and manual transmission) are 7.5 L/100 km (38 mpg_{‑imp}; 31 mpg_{‑US}) at 90 km/h (55.9 mph), 9.4 L/100 km (30 mpg_{‑imp}; 25 mpg_{‑US}) at 120 km/h (74.6 mph), and 13.1 L/100 km (21.6 mpg_{‑imp}; 18.0 mpg_{‑US}) at city speeds, according to the 1991 European sales brochure.

The US Legacy was introduced with three trim levels: the Standard, the "L," and the "LS." In 1991, the Standard was removed and the "LSi" was introduced as an "LS" with gray leather interior on the sedan only, similar to the "Gala" and "Heritage" approach internationally. The US-spec Standard was very similar to the Euro-spec DL and the Japanese-spec Ei, with a very sparse level of equipment. The 1990 models can be distinguished from the 1991 models by the color of the rub strip that encompasses the vehicle; 1990 the color was gray and 1991 the color was black. Also, the color of the automatic front seat shoulder belt latch was interior color for 1990 and black for 1991 and subsequent years. For the 1991 model year, the "L" trim level was available with a Value Plus option package, which included anti-lock brakes, power windows, central locking, air conditioning, cruise control, and the 80W stereo.

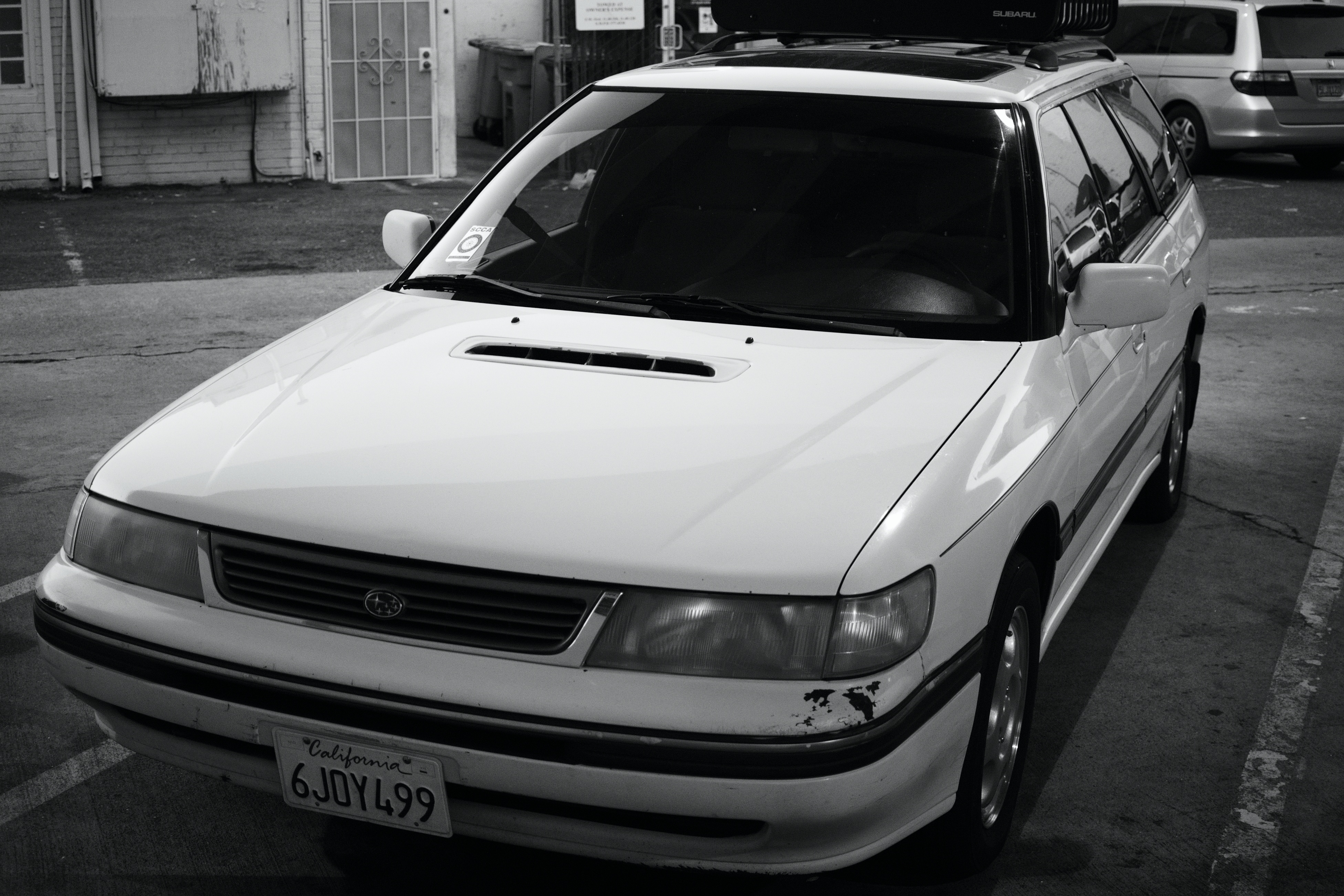
1992-1994 Legacy Touring Wagon

The 2.2 turbo, called the "Sport Sedan", was also introduced to the United States in 1991. The US-spec 1991–1992 Sport Sedan has Alcantara interior in gray and was not available in Japan, Europe or Australia. The 1993–94 Touring Wagons and Sports Sedans received black plastic and fabric interiors.

In 1992, the "LSi" was introduced on the wagon, alongside the newly introduced turbocharged "LE" Touring Wagon. The fuel efficiency for the 2.2-liter engine (non-turbo, manual transmission 4WD) is 20 mpg_{‑US} (12 L/100 km; 24 mpg_{‑imp}) city and 27 mpg_{‑US} (8.7 L/100 km; 32 mpg_{‑imp}) at highway speeds, based on figures listed in the 1991 American sales brochure. The US version offered three interior color choices adding a light brown selection to the list. Upholstery selections were tricot for base level "L" and velour for the uplevel "LS". Leather was only available on all versions internationally from Subaru in gray. The air suspension height control was only available on the wagon with an automatic transmission, and a non-turbocharged engine in all international markets. No sedans were manufactured by Subaru with the air suspension height control, unlike the Honda Accord and Honda Vigor top trim level sedans and hatchbacks which were. AWD was standard only on the US Sport Sedan, Touring Wagon and the 1994 LSI sedan and wagons, and optional on all other US trim levels. Extended roof wagons were not available on the US Legacy (save for the 1994 Legacy GT wagon), until the Outback was introduced.

Many rural United States Postal Service routes used specially ordered right hand drive Legacys to deliver mail. These wagons were available from 1990 to 1999 and differed very little from the private use "L" trim level Legacy.

In addition to the GT, which was offered with a raised roof, but without a turbo, the Ti Outdoor Wagon, Mi Alpine Sport Wagon, GX 2.2L Sun Sport Wagon were 1994-only trim levels available in the United States. Each had unique options, and may have been sold only in specific areas of the US. See Subaru Legacy Archives, specs, options, colors 1990, 1991, 1992, 1993, 1994 for a list.

Trim levels on the US version can be easily identified by the color of the outside door handles. Base trim levels can be identified by chrome door handles, whereas uplevel had painted door handles that match the exterior color. Japanese models all had chrome door handles and European and Australian versions all had painted door handles. The US door handle tradition continued until the 2010 model year on the fifth generation Legacy platform, with Subaru using black plastic instead of chrome starting with 1994 Legacy lower trim levels. The 1992 model year saw the Japanese-spec door handles changed to the European version of painted handles, a feature they still use on current models.

== Specifications ==
=== Chassis types ===
The first generation Legacy model codes are decoded with the first letter "B" representing the Legacy model. The second letters are C (sedan), J (flat roof wagon), and F (high roof wagon). The third character represents the engine and drivetrain: 2 (1.8-liter 2WD), 3 (1.8-liter 4WD), 4 (2.0-liter 2WD), 5 (2.0-liter 4WD), 6 (2.2-liter 2WD), 7 (2.2-liter 4WD), A (2.0-liter 4WD with air suspension), and B (2.2-liter 4WD with air suspension).

Code	BC	BJ	BF
Body style	sedan	flat roof wagon	high roof wagon

=== Transmissions ===
The newly developed computer-controlled 4-speed automatic transmission, called the 4EAT in both FWD and AWD guises, uses a lock up torque converter, and does not use an overdrive feature. The transmission had a feature where it could be instructed to ignore 1st gear from a standing stop to assist driving on traction limited situations, such as ice and snow. The system was activated by depressing a button on the gearshift selector marked "Manual" and moving the gearshift from the "D" position down to "3rd". A yellow indicator light marked "Manual" also lights up at the bottom center of the instrument cluster when the system is ready to be used. The car would then start in 2nd gear, and not 1st, then as the car gained speed would shift up to 3rd, locking out 4th gear. The transmission's computer also splits the delivered torque 50:50 between the front and rear wheels. Once the car stopped, the transmission would start back in 2nd and not 1st, until the system was disengaged with the "Manual" button or upshifting to 4th.

The automatic transmission also has engine over-rev protection by shifting the transmission to the next available gear once 6500 rpm has been achieved, even if the gear selector is in a low gear position. The computer that monitors and controls automatic transmission operations and status is networked with the fuel injection management computer, as well as the cruise control and anti-lock brake computer, if so equipped. Information is shared so that the vehicle operates as efficiently as possible. The computers that monitored various conditions also have the ability to store occurrences of possible malfunction, and aid qualified mechanics in the diagnosis and possible repair of various systems.

The automatic transmission used on AWD equipped vehicles would normally send 90% of the engines torque to the front wheels and 10% to the rear wheels, using a computer-controlled, continuously variable, multi-plate transfer clutch. When the front wheels began to experience a loss of grip, the transmission automatically sent available torque to the rear wheels, up to 50:50 split between the front and rear wheels until grip was reestablished at the front wheels, without notifying the driver or occupants that torque was being redirected. When accelerating or driving uphill, the vehicles weight shifts rearward, reducing front wheel traction, causing the transmission to automatically send torque to the rear wheels to compensate. When braking or driving downhill, the vehicle's weight shifts towards the front, reducing rear wheel traction. The transmission again compensates by sending torque to the front wheels for better steering control and braking performance. If the automatic is placed in Reverse or "1st" gear, the transmission divides the torque 50:50 to both front and rear wheels. A limited-slip rear differential was standard on the 1991 US Sport Sedan (Turbocharged version).

The automatic transmission also has the ability to change the shift points, and hold the gears longer when the engine is operating at higher RPMs. This is achieved by pressing the accelerator pedal quickly, which causes an indicator light marked as "Power" at the bottom center of the instrument cluster to light up. The European and Australian version came equipped with a center console installed override switch labeled "AT Econo" which instructed the computer to utilize the "Power" mode, and remain so until the switch was reset to "Econo" mode. The "Power" mode was also available for engine braking, causing the transmission to downshift 500 rpm earlier than in "normal" mode. For 1991, the "Manual" button on the gearshift was replaced by a "Econo" switch on the gearshift, and the console mounted button was changed from "AT Econo" to "Manual", so that the transmission was always in "Econo" mode until the gearshift mounted switch was disengaged. Unlike the United States and Japanese version, which went into "Power" mode only when the accelerator was pushed rapidly, the "Power" mode on the European and Australian version was activated by either console or gearshift installed switches.

The manual transmission uses a true gear type viscous limited-slip center differential (VLSD). The secondary shaft in the transmission is hollow with the pinion shaft extending through it to the center differential. It provides a 50:50 torque balance under acceleration and deceleration up to the point of wheel slip, then the VLSD begins to send more torque to the wheels with more traction. Non-turbo model also included hill holder which allows the car to remain stopped on an incline by only depressing the clutch pedal, instead of both the clutch and brake pedal.

=== Engines ===
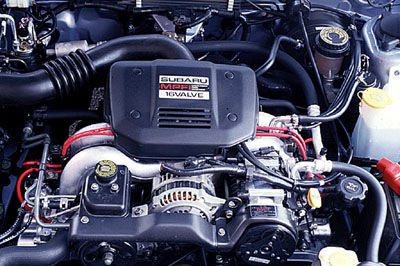
1990 EJ22 non-turbo

The EJ series flat-4 aluminium alloy engine, specially developed for the Legacy, was the most powerful engine Subaru had built to date, and the engine is currently offered in many configurations. In an attempt to ensure durability and longevity, Subaru chose to use five main crankshaft bearings. The engine has either single or double overhead camshaft architecture and pent-roof, cross flow cylinder firing chambers. The ignition utilized distributorless ignition, using a computer-controlled coil pack and spark plug wires to supply the electrical charge. Later versions of this engine used coil packs installed directly on top of the spark plug. Problems detected by the cars' on-board computers are signified by a "check engine" light, alerting the driver that maintenance is needed immediately. The air-fuel mixture is monitored by a mass air flow sensor and emissions are controlled by an oxygen sensor installed in front of a catalytic converter. It also uses reverse flow engine cooling, meaning cool water from the radiator entered the cylinder heads first and then exited through the top of the engine block back into the top of the radiator. The water flow was controlled by the thermostat which is located next to the water pump underneath the engine. Installing the thermostat in this position allows it to more accurately control the temperature of the water as it enters the engine from the cylinder heads first, thereby better preventing an occurrence of thermal shock.

When it debuted in the US, it was introduced with a slightly larger displacing SOHC 2.2-liter 135 bhp (101 kW; 137 PS) engine that was also used for the European, British and Australian versions over the Japanese market version of DOHC 2.0 liters. The 2.0-liter and 2.2-liter engines fuel delivery were managed with sequential multiport common rail fuel injection called MPFI, and the 1.8-liter engine used a throttle body fuel injection system with single injector called SPFI. The Japanese use the smaller engine because of Japanese vehicle size legislation, which determines the tax to be paid based on the cars dimensions and engine displacement. However, the Japanese domestic market (JDM) engine was more powerful, even without the turbo. The JDM DOHC 2.0-liter 150 PS (110 kW) non turbocharged engine had a dual stage intake manifold where at approximately 3200–3500 engine RPMs four individual valves would allow additional air flow into the engine from a secondary manifold attached and located underneath the primary intake manifold.

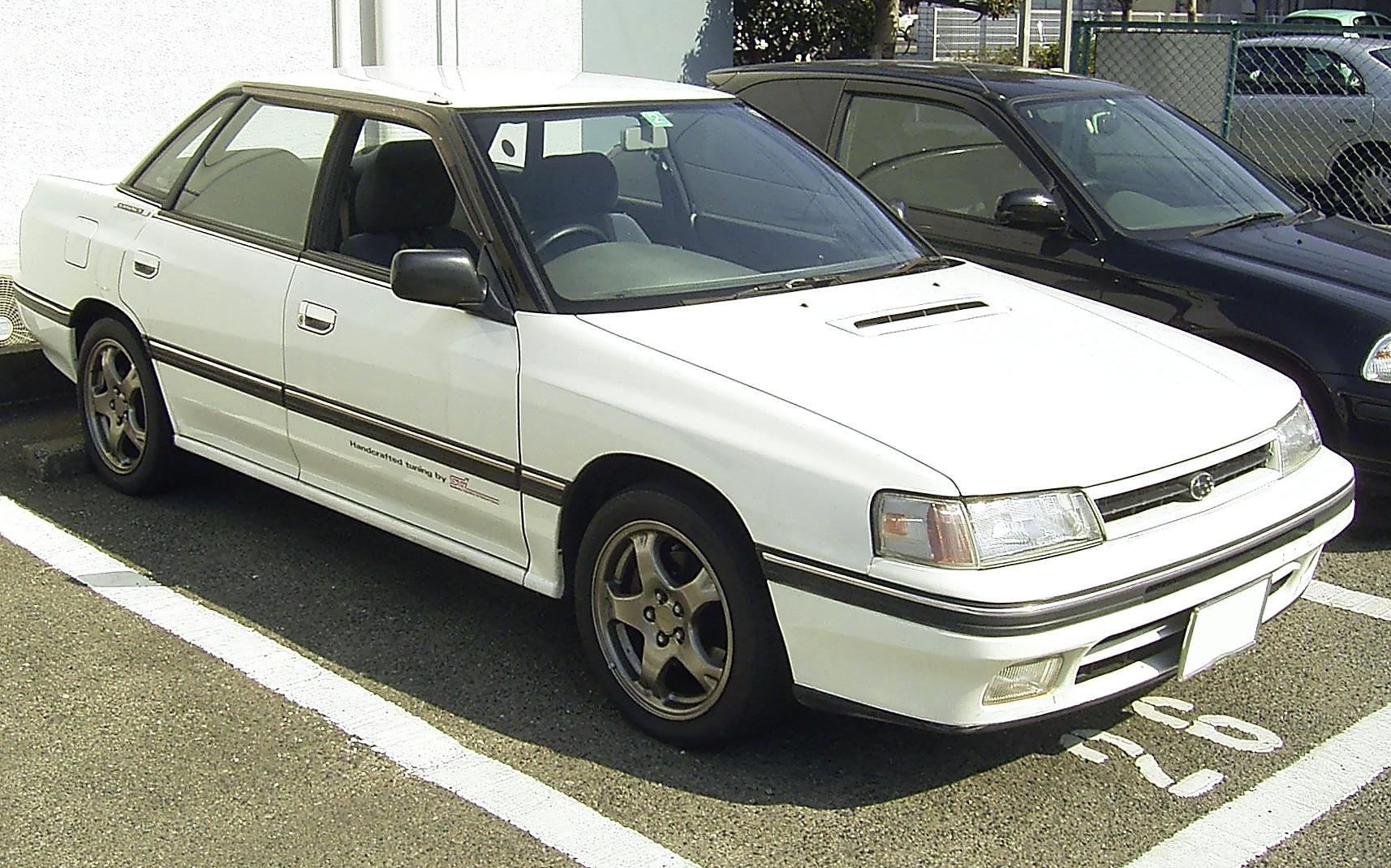
Legacy RS Turbo

The DOHC 2.0-liter turbocharged 162 kW (220 PS; 217 hp) EJ20G engine, which is a prized engine worldwide amongst Subaru enthusiasts, was introduced first in the Legacy and later used in the Impreza WRX when that model was introduced in 1993. In Europe, the Legacy RS Turbo was sometimes referred to as the "Lunacy" Turbo. The Australians were offered the Japanese-spec RS turbo sedan with the DOHC 2.0-liter engine in 1991, and Europe and the UK the same engine in 1992, manual transmission only. The Japanese-spec model, sans emissions equipment, was sold in New Zealand with marginally higher power of 164 kW (223 PS) at 6000 rpm. The DOHC 2.0-liter turbo also came with a water-cooled intercooler. The turbocharged engine was initially offered internationally in the sedan only, with Japanese buyers able to choose between a sedan or wagon on the GT starting in 1990.

The USA SOHC EJ22T 2.2-liter 163 bhp (122 kW; 165 PS) turbo was not offered with the water-cooled intercooler when it was introduced in 1991. The US turbocharged engine was available with either a manual or automatic transmission on sedans and automatics only on wagons. The 2.2 turbo engine, code "EJ22T", was available only in the United States and Canada. It was loosely based on the normally-aspirated/NA EJ22E used in the non-turbo models, but had a closed-deck short block engine, coated pistons (but not forged) with a lower compression ratio, different cylinder heads to support the oil and coolant needs of the turbo, among other turbo-specific details.

Subaru did not sell a Legacy Turbo in the United States from 1995 to 2004. This was due to Subaru having upgraded the single turbo used in the Legacy with a twin turbo engine starting with the Second Generation and continued with the Third Generation. The twin turbo configuration was not compatible with left-hand drive vehicles because the turbo on the left side interferes with both the brake master cylinder and steering linkage, among other things. The new in 1994 Legacy GT wagon (no sedan version), built in the Indiana, US, plant used the same EJ22E engine as the other non-turbo models. It was not equivalent to the GT models sold on other continents with the EJ20G turbocharged engine.

=== Safety ===
In the United States, the Legacy was introduced with automatic seat belts due to United States National Highway Traffic Safety Administration (NHTSA) regulations stating that all cars produced from April 1, 1989, were to be equipped with a passive front passenger restraint system that would protect front occupants from frontal impact without occupant participation. This regulation was enacted to force manufacturers to install air bags in their vehicles. In 1991, Subaru added a driver side airbag only (as an option) for 1992 models which didn't satisfy the U.S. regulation. The 1993 and 1994 models all had a driver side airbag standard. If a vehicle had dual air bags, the passive seat belt systems could be removed, which Subaru did in 1995, with the Second Generation. The monocoque body integrated a steel safety cage that surrounded the passenger compartment, with collapsible engine and trunk sections for added passenger protection. Steel beams were added inside the front and rear door to protect passengers from side collisions. To increase the rigidity of the front and rear bumpers, a styrofoam insert is added, which is used on vehicles sold only in North America.

Subaru asserts the inclusion of their AWD technology is a safety feature, allowing the driver to avoid possible unsafe conditions by enabling the vehicle to maintain contact with the road and avoid a possible accident, even during inclement weather . On vehicles equipped with ABS and AWD, if the ABS system is activated due to emergency braking, the ABS computer is networked with the transmission computer, which instructs the AWD to send power to all wheels while the ABS is stopping the vehicle so that the wheels maintain contact with the road. All turbocharged vehicles, both sedan and wagon, were sold equipped with ABS and rear ventilated disc brakes as standard equipment, except in Australia where ABS was optional on the RS turbo.

The Japanese vehicles had rear lap belts only on the lower trim levels and 3-point outboard position lap and shoulder belts with a center rear position lap belt on all vehicles with the 2.0-liter engine. Seat belt pre-tensioners with emergency locking retractors (ELR) were standard equipment in Japanese vehicles with the VZ trim package and all vehicles equipped with the turbocharged engine.

Canadian spec Legacy were not fitted with automatic seat belts due to objections from the Canadian Government and current United States owners have been known to convert the automatic seat belts to the Canadian version when the mechanism fails to retract. Replacing the failed automatic seat belt is currently cost-prohibitive due to current Subaru pricing for failed parts.

All Legacy wagons sold in Europe came with rear seat headrests and 3-point outboard position lap and shoulder belts as standard equipment, whereas rear headrests were available on upper trim levels elsewhere. All international Legacy, except the US, had front seat adjustable anchor shoulder belts.

=== Equipment ===
Some of the affordable luxury items included express up and express down driver side power window, an electric tilt and sliding moonroof with ventilated sunshade, tilt steering with memory feature that allowed the spring-loaded steering column to "jump up" and out of the way, power mirrors, 4-way adjustable headrests, velour upholstery and upgraded plush carpeting on the USDM 1990 Legacy LS sedan and wagon, adding leather-wrapped steering wheel, gearshift and parking brake handle in 1991. Also in 1991, automatic digital climate control, which was deleted in 1992, and an in-dash CD player, among other things were added to the US options list. Several exterior paint choices came with a pearlescent appearance, offered only in the United States.

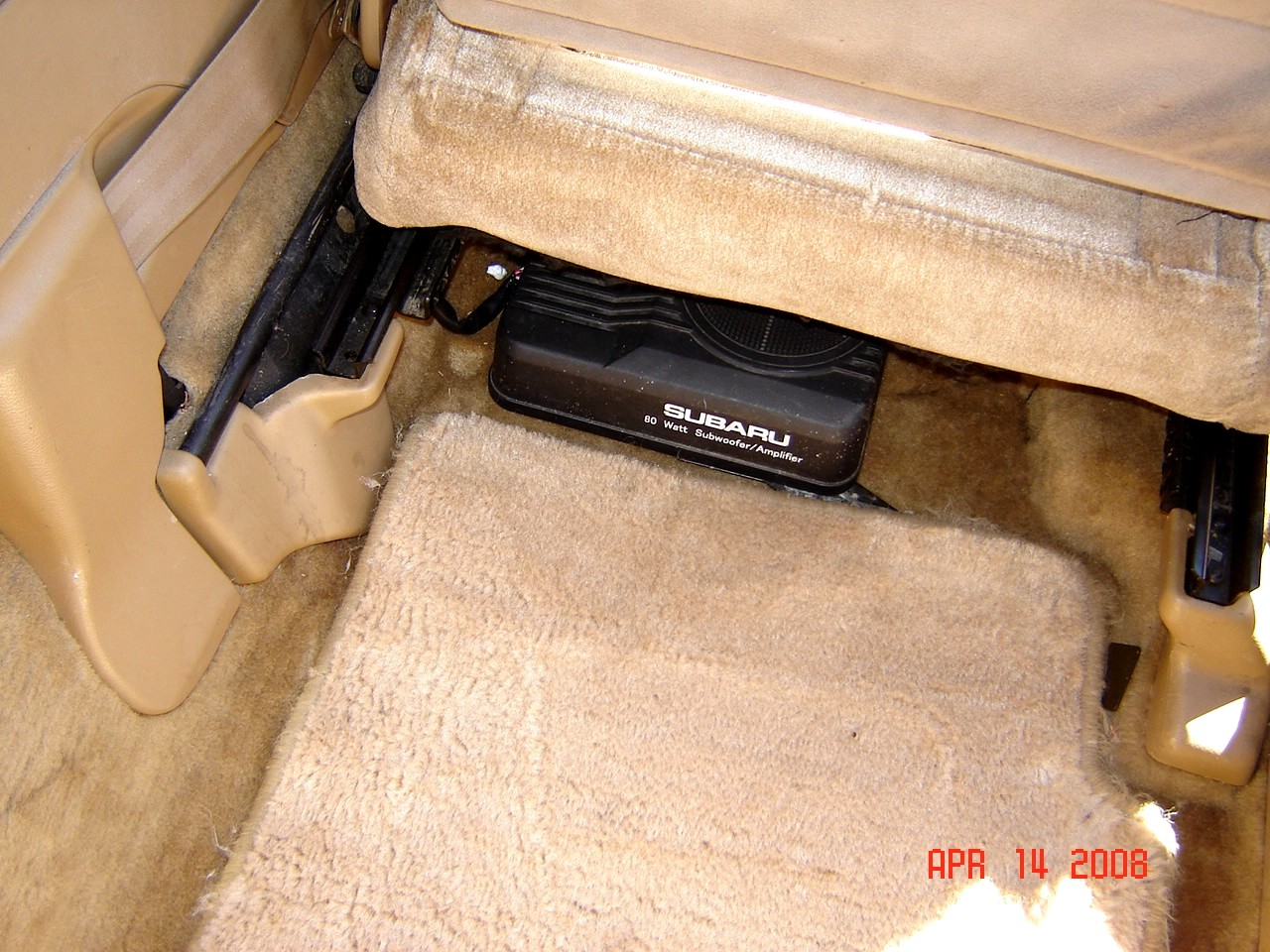
Subaru subwoofer-amplifier

Some of the factory installed double DIN (180 x 100 mm panel) 80 watt stereos with the integrated equalizer and cassette players, sourced from Clarion and Panasonic, came with a 3.5 mm auxiliary port on the front of the stereo, which enables current digital music devices to be played. The Japanese version of this factory installed stereo was rated at 100W and the volume control knob was situated on the right side of the stereo and the frequency display was on the left. The stereo unit used for the United States and Australia had the volume control on the left and the frequency display on the right. The in-dash CD player, sourced from Clarion, was available on the United States, Japanese and Australian sedan and wagon as an extra cost option, and is easily attached to the double DIN stereo. In 1994, Subaru made available an 80 watt subwoofer/amplifier located under the front passenger seat in the United States, and a side view mirror tweeter speaker kit available as a US dealer-installed accessory with limited availability. Factory stereos standard DIN (180 x 50 mm panel) with 40 watt installed in European vehicles were sourced from Philips or Fujitsu Ten.

The European and British versions were installed with standard headlight washers and rear fog lights, so that other drivers could see them in inclement weather and at night. European models also received glass-lens halogen headlights that could have the distance the light was projected adjusted from an electric switch installed on the dashboard, and also received speed sensitive, variable effort power steering, and both items were standard installed. The Australian-spec sedan and wagon were equipped with the rear fog light, but not the headlight washers. The British and Europeans could also install a front bumper bull bar and an 8 mm (0.31 in) thick steel sump guard that extended from the bottom edge of the front bumper to the front suspension. The Europeans could not get an in-dash cupholder located in the small space below the HVAC controls and above the stereo, found in the Australian, United States and Japanese models. In that location instead is a clock, and a button to deploy an electric radio antenna, if so equipped. Clocks are integrated with the OEM stereo internationally.

The Japanese versions offered electrically folding power mirrors, 8-way power drivers seat with power recline for the seat back, and infrared keyless remote entry integrated into the ignition key. The GT and VZ had a feature where the driver's door could be opened without using a key or remote, using a driver programmed security code that was entered by pulling the exterior door handle a specific number of times, in accordance with a 4-digit security code found in its memory. This feature was only installed on vehicles with the infrared keyless remote. Vehicles equipped with the infrared keyless remote feature can be identified by having a dark plastic receiver patch installed on the driver's door handle, located directly above the entry lock keyhole. The transmitter installed in the ignition key was aimed at this receiver patch on the door handle.

The Japanese could also choose from two factory installed high end stereos and speaker packages from Alpine and Kenwood with integrated CD players, a rear wiper on the back of the sedan as well as the wagon, a spring-loaded ejecting front ashtray, (GT, RS, VZ, and VZ height controlled wagon only), an electrostatic air purifier mounted behind the rear seats on the parcel shelf for the sedan and a combined air purifier/overhead interior light for the wagon, automatic climate control with digital temperature display, vehicle speed sensitive power door locks, halogen fog lights with either clear or yellow lenses, and the ability to switch off the speed sensitive, variable effort power steering on the RS turbo sedan. All vehicles manufactured for sale in Japan with power windows had a feature where the power windows would still operate for 30 seconds after removing the ignition key.

== 1992 facelift and other changes ==
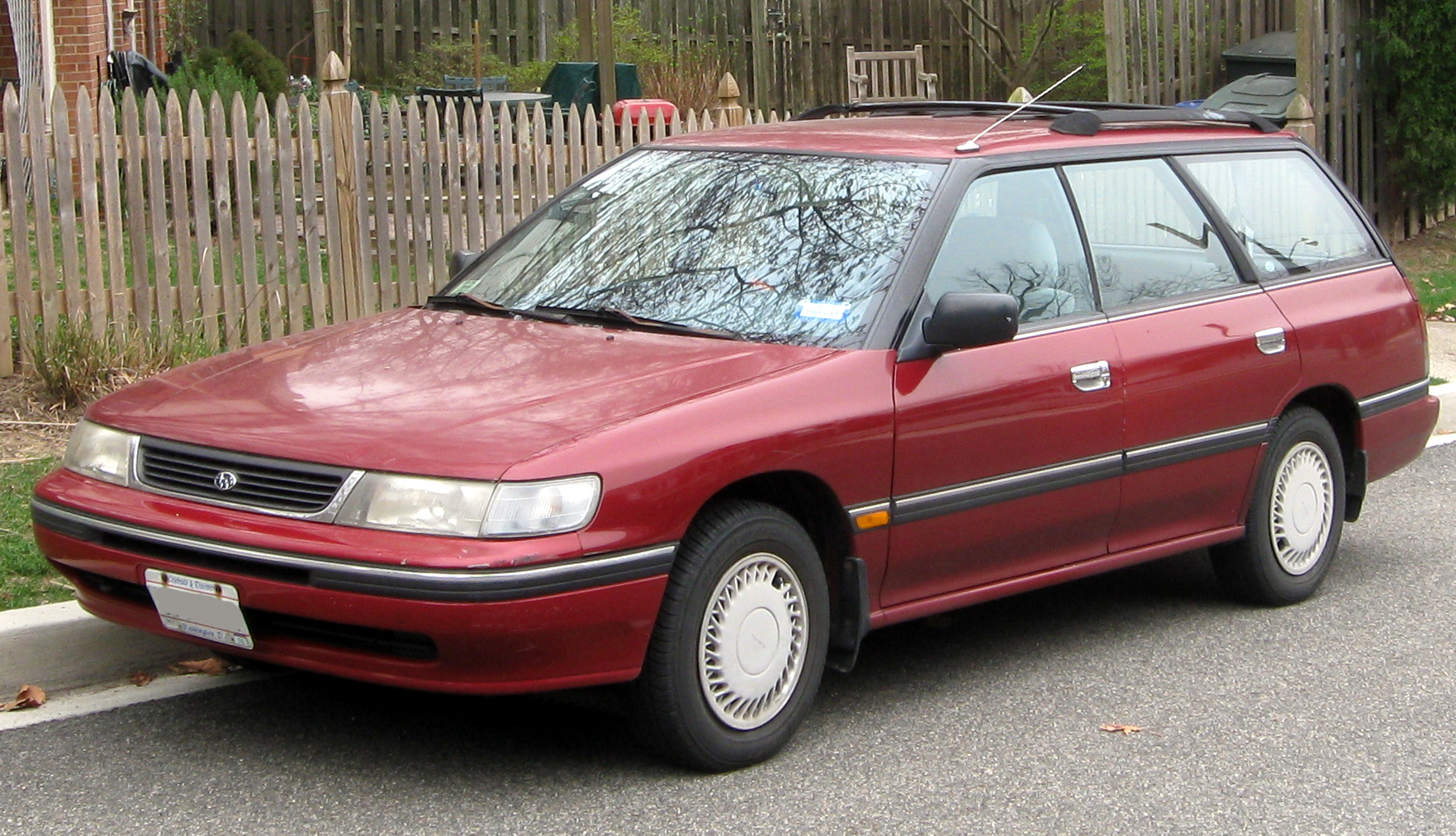
Facelift Subaru Legacy L wagon

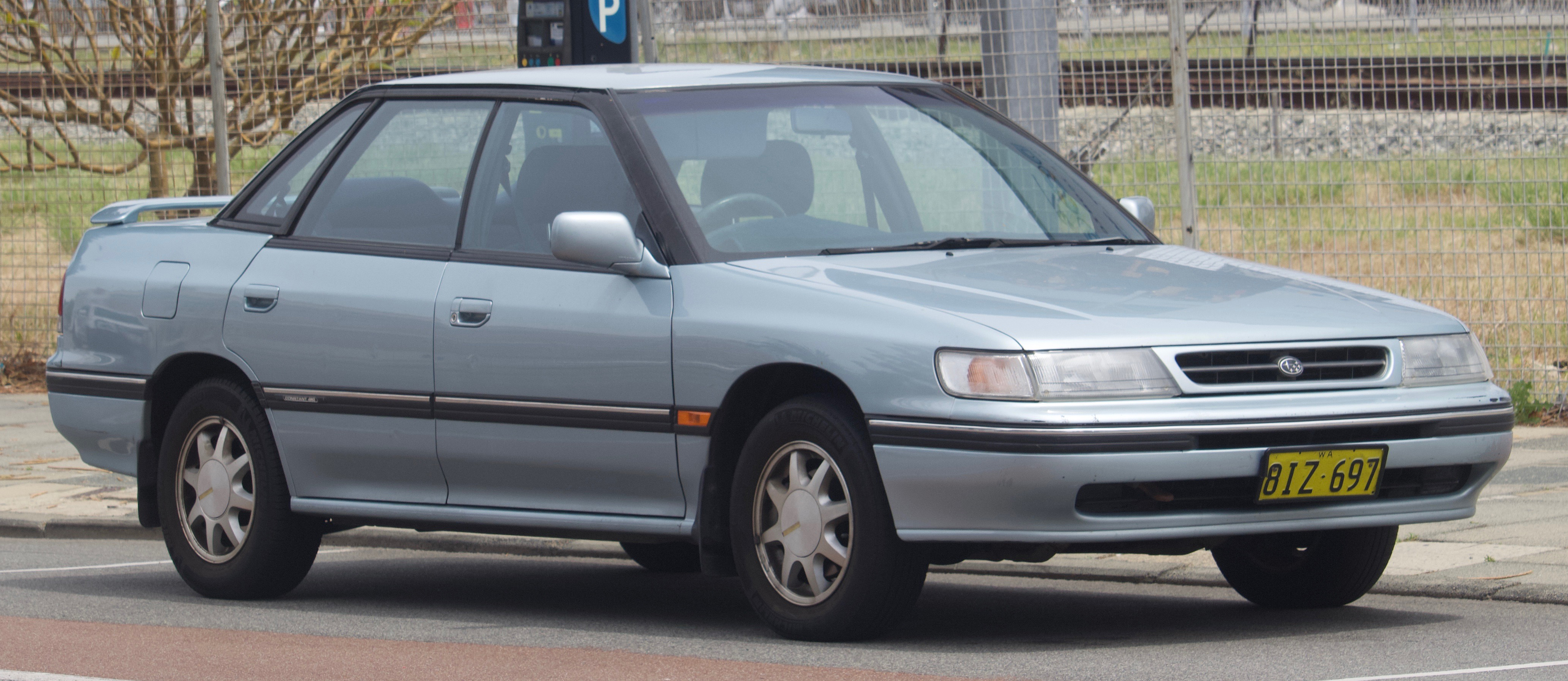
Facelift Subaru Liberty GX sedan

A minor facelift to the front end came in 1991 for the 1992 model year, revising the grille, front fenders, hood and headlamps to provide a similar appearance with the introduction of the Subaru SVX luxury GT coupe, along with interior and exterior color changes. For MY 1994, the US-spec wagons were available with minor trim packages, called the Alpine Sport and Sun Sport, which were basically "L" trim level wagons with optional equipment, such as heated front seats, added as a "Value Option Group" and also came with graphics denoting the package on the exterior of the vehicle. The US-spec LSi wagon was available with tan leather interior, with matching leather on the steering wheel, gearshift selector, center armrest, interior door panels, and parking brake handle. The red plastic rear trim piece, on both the sedan and wagon, continues but the word "Subaru" is exchanged for the word "Legacy". Also, the Subaru star logo is no longer used on the back of the sedan or wagon.

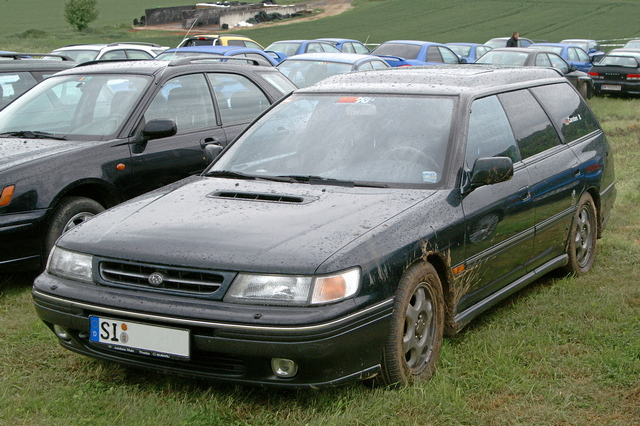
Facelift Subaru Legacy RS wagon (Europe)

Japanese models saw the introduction of the GT type S2 sedan, which added BBS alloy wheels and rear trunk spoiler as standard equipment, the VZ type R, and the Brighton 220, which had much of the luxury equipment from the VZ trim level and the 2.2 SOHC engine installed in only the Touring Wagon. The Japanese-spec TZ was replaced by the Brighton trim name. In August 1992, the "Legacy Touring Wagon STi" was released and limited to 200 units. A Nardi three spoke black leather steering wheel was installed with the "STi" logo on the center horn button. The only major upgrade mentioned was upgrading the fuel injection ECU, and increasing the turbocharger pressure from the standard 450 mmHg to 650 mmHg, which was being used on the "RS" sedan and the same engine torque output, with an automatic transmission only. The 1989–1991 Japanese version incorporated the side repeater into the side of the front corner turn signal lens with the side repeater protruding from the lens so that it could be seen laterally, then later adopting the European configuration in 1992.

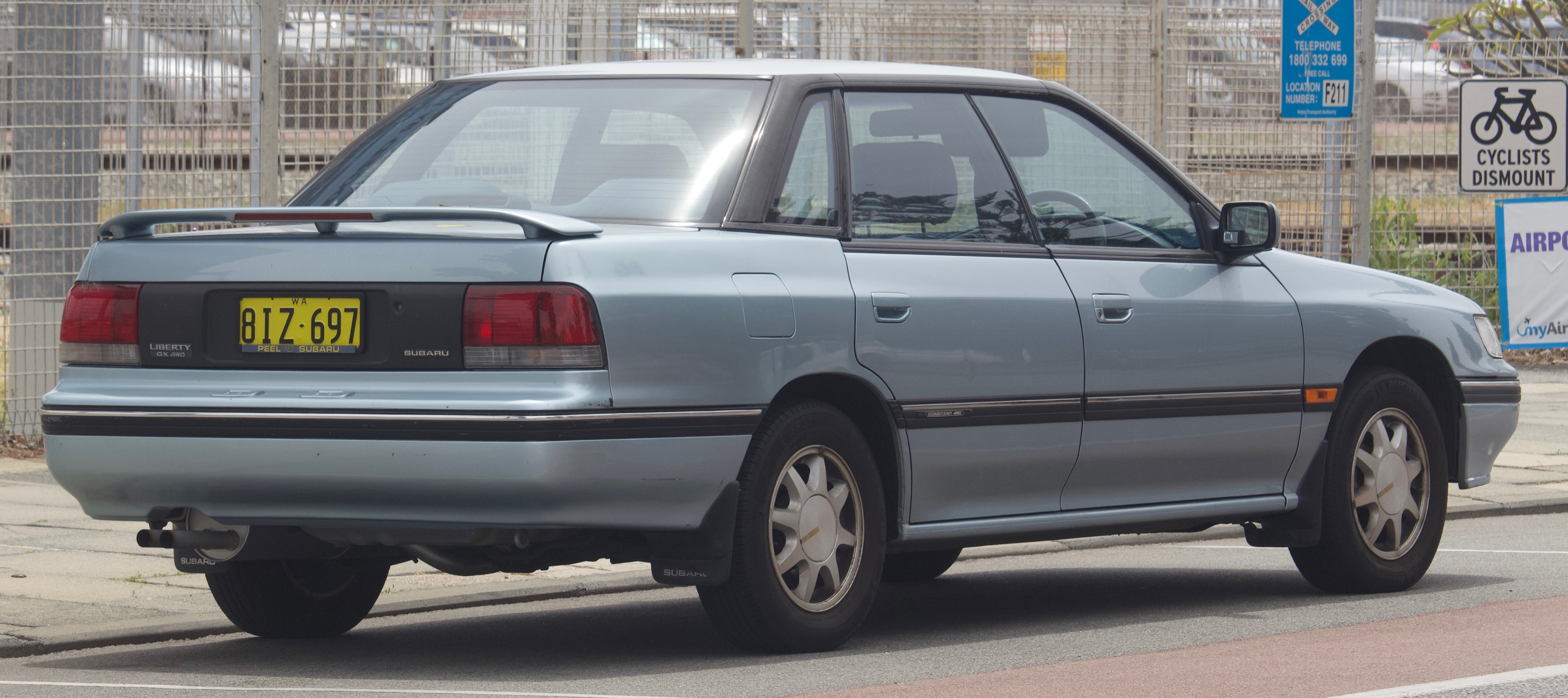
Facelift Subaru Liberty GX sedan

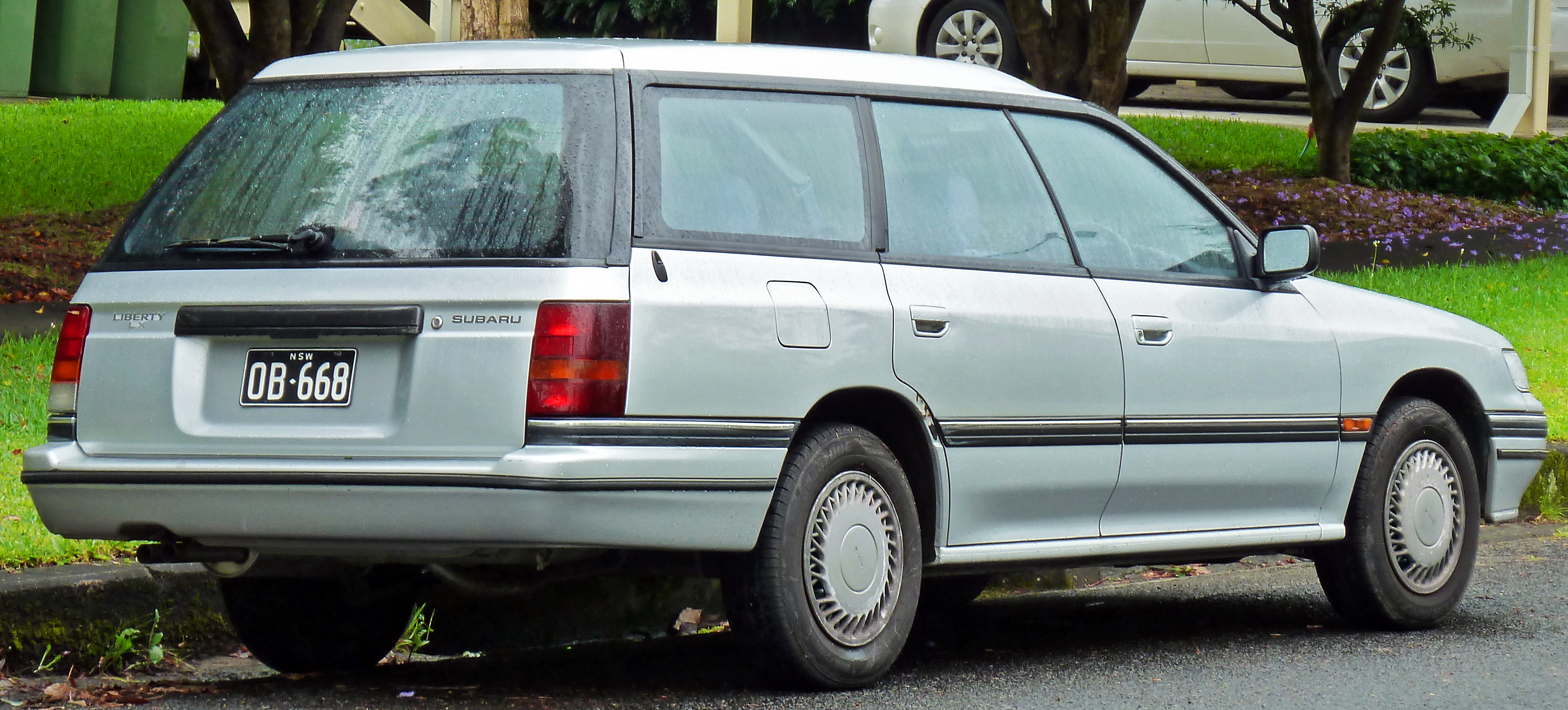
Facelift Subaru Liberty LX wagon

The 1989–1994 European and Australian Legacy had side repeater lenses installed in the front fender just behind the front wheel, with the front turn signals installed next to the headlights. Starting with the 1992 facelift, the European model sold in Germany was available in a "Hubertus 2" trim level on the 1.8 L wagon only; it was offered in green with a manual transmission, all-wheel drive was standard equipment with the dual range transmission, and was also fitted with a painted brush guard matching the body color that protected the front grille and headlights, wrapping around to protect the side turn signals. It was also fitted with the height adjustable air suspension, allowing the vehicle to travel off-road. The name Hubertus is used by a German hunting knife manufacturer and the name Hubertus is the patron saint of hunters.

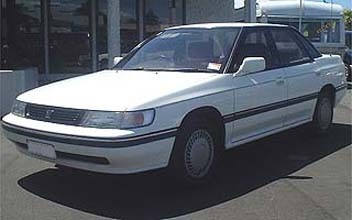
Facelift Isuzu Aska

The front turn signals were relocated from underneath the bumper on US versions to their new location next to the headlights, as in the Japanese, Australian and European versions. Side repeater lenses were also added to the US version, but they were used as side marker lights and not turn signal repeaters.

In the United States, parking lights were installed next to the headlights for MY 1990–1991 within dedicated corner lenses, then incorporated with the front turn signals from 1992 to current models. Parking lights for European, Australian and Japanese versions were incorporated inside the headlights, on the outer edge. All international versions of the Legacy utilize a dedicated parking light switch installed on top of the steering column until model year 2010.

The facelifted Legacy appeared for the 1992 model year in the US, Japan and Australia; the second generation was introduced in October 1993 in Japan and Australia. It was also sold as the Isuzu Aska for the 1992 model year.

== Motorsports ==
Just before the introduction of the Legacy to the United States, three Japanese-spec Legacy RS turbo sedans were sent to the FIA test track in Phoenix, Arizona, where they were driven at an average speed of 223.4 km/h (138.8 mph) for almost 19 days, accumulating 100,000 kilometres (62,000 mi) in that time, setting a new world record for land speed endurance, stopping only for fuel and routine service.

On another occasion, two AWD Legacy wagons finished 1st and 2nd place in the 1990 Alcan Winter Rally that covered 6,300 miles (10,100 km) from Seattle, Washington to the Arctic Circle and back and another wagon won the race again in 1992.

The Safari Rally event in 1990 saw two Subaru Legacys finish the rally, with one car driven by Patrik Njiru winning in the Group N category. During the 1990 Safari Rally, 58 vehicles entered but only 10 cars crossed the finish line. Group N is a designation noting that the car is nearly identical to showroom models. The only modifications made are those required to meet safety regulations for the event. Another Group N Legacy finished the 1990 Acropolis Rally driven by Ian Duncan taking top honors and finishing the race in eighth place.

=== WRC victories ===
No.	Event	Season	Driver	Co-driver
1	23rd Rothmans Rally of New Zealand	1993	(United Kingdom) Colin McRae	(United Kingdom) Derek Ringer

== Marketing ==
The Legacy was introduced in the United States as a competitor to the Honda Accord, Toyota Camry, Nissan Stanza, and Mazda 626, with the Legacy offering all wheel drive (AWD) as a major distinguishing feature against its competition. (Toyota initially offered AWD on the Camry in the United States in limited markets, with the designation Camry LE All-Trac, but discontinued the feature due to disappointing sales.) The only Japanese competitor to continue offering all-wheel-drive in a similarly sized sedan was Mitsubishi in the premium sport package Mitsubishi Galant VR-4, whereas Subaru offered all-wheel-drive as an option on all trim levels internationally. When the Legacy appeared in Japan, its full name was the "Legacy Touring Sedan". The Legacy wagon in Japan has always been described as the "Legacy Touring Wagon" and not a station wagon or estate, a tradition still maintained. Legacy trim levels also match the trim packages offered in North America, using "L" for the entry-level model and "LS" on upper trim level products.

In Japan, the early 1990s saw a rise in popularity of entry level luxury 4-door hardtop sedans, notably the Nissan Presea, Toyota Carina ED, Honda Vigor, Mazda (Efini) MS-8 and the Mitsubishi Emeraude all utilizing frameless side windows on a compact sedan wheelbase. Some vehicles had a slim "B" pillar between the front and rear door while others didn't. The Japanese-spec Legacy RS Turbo competed with the Toyota Carina G Limited and the Nissan Bluebird SSS-R. The Legacy wagon appeared around the same time as the Nissan Avenir.

Bruce Willis lent himself to a Japanese market advertising campaign featuring both print media and TV commercials. Willis reappeared in a commercial for the fourth generation model to celebrate the production of the 3 millionth Legacy in 2005.
