= Subaru Legacy (second generation) =

Second generation of Subaru Legacy

Legacy BD-BG-BK series
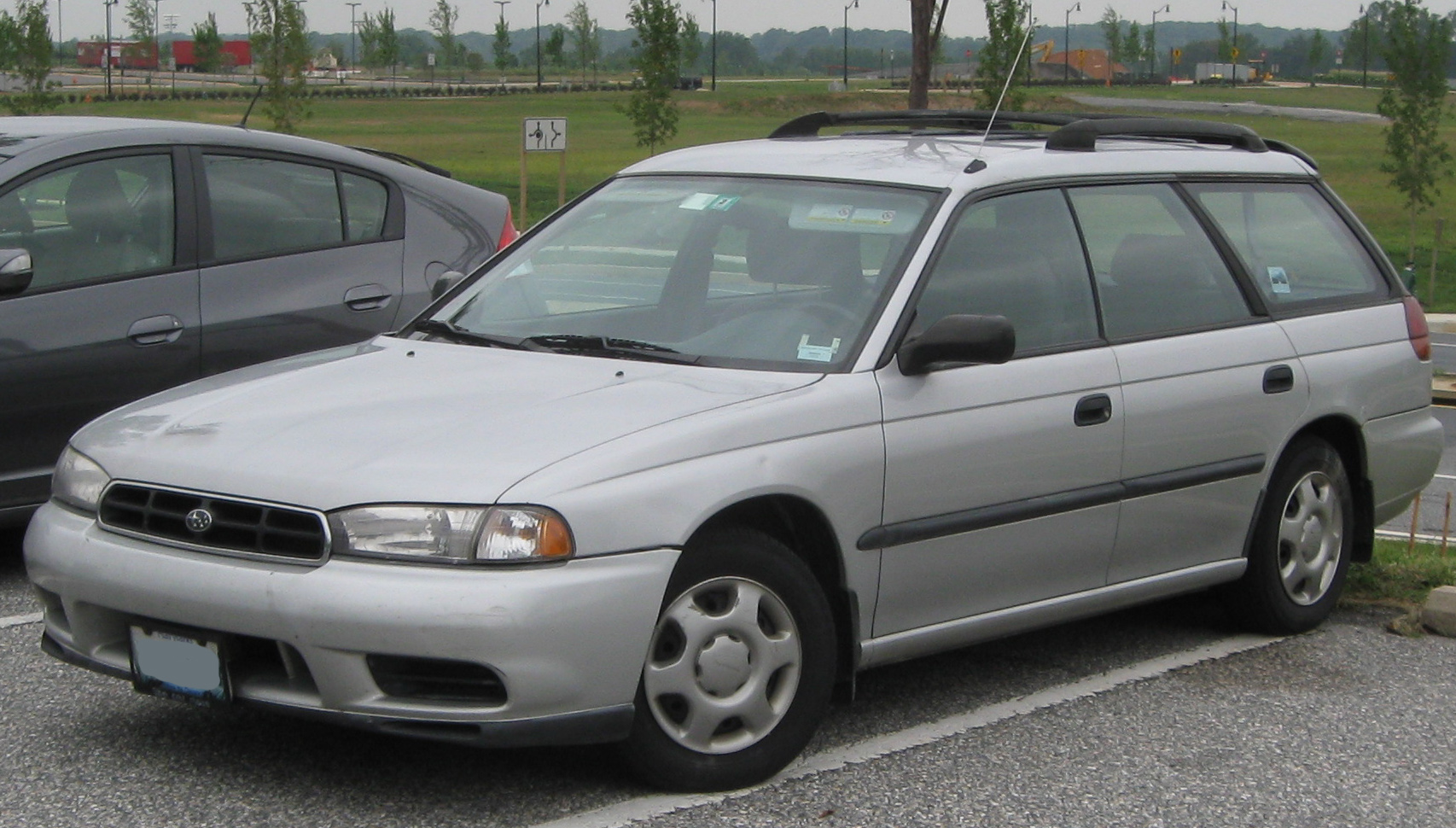

Overview
- Manufacturer: Subaru (Fuji Heavy Industries)
- Model code: BD/BG/BK
- Also called: Subaru Liberty (Australia)
- Production: 1993–1999
- Designer: Olivier Boulay (1991)

Body and chassis
- Body style: "B" pillar Hardtop and Wagon
- Layout: FF layout 1993–1995 standard continued to be standard until 1999 in Japan and Europe; F4 layout 1995 optional, continued to be optional until 1999 in Japan and Europe; 1996 & up, standard for (North America)
- Related: Subaru Outback

Powertrain
- Engine: 2.0 L EJ20 H4; 2.0 L EJ20 DOHC H4; 2.2 L EJ22 H4; 2.5 L EJ25 DOHC H4; 2.0 L EJ20 DOHC twin-turbo H4
- Transmission: 4-speed automatic 5-speed manual

Dimensions
- Wheelbase: 2,630 mm (103.5 in)
- Length: 1993–1997 Sedan: 4,590 mm (180.9 in); 1998–1999 Sedan: 4,610 mm (181.5 in); 1998–1999 Wagon: 4,690 mm (184.5 in); 1993–1996 Wagon: 4,670 mm (183.9 in)
- Width: 1,710 mm (67.5 in) (Int'l); 1,695 mm (66.75 in) (Japan)
- Height: Wagon: 1,450 mm (57.1 in); 2.5GT Wagon: 1,530 mm (60.3 in); Sedan: 1,400 mm (55.3 in); 2.5GT Sedan: 1,410 mm (55.7 in)
- Curb weight: 1,422 kg (3,135 lb) max

Chronology
- Predecessor: Subaru Legacy (first generation)
- Successor: Subaru Legacy (third generation)

The second-generation Subaru Legacy was marketed in Japan from October 1993, and July 1994 (for the 1995 model year) marked the second generation in North America with a full body and chassis revision. The exterior was designed by Olivier Boulay in 1991, during his tenure at Subaru. The tail light appearance on both the sedan and wagon was influenced by the taillights on the SVX.

== North American models ==
Legacy models starting with the lowest price (and least equipped) were the Brighton, L (Luxury), LS (Luxury Sedan), LSi, GT (Grand Touring), Outback, and SUS (Sport Utility Sedan), depending on year.

The LS (upgraded cloth seats, among other interior and exterior options) and LSi (added leather to the LS options) were only available from 1995 to early 1997 model years. The LSi model in 1996 and 1997 include the more powerful EJ25D and only with an automatic transmission.

In 1996, the GT model returned but included the EJ25D engine along with unique interior colors and exterior updates, as well as suspension upgrades.

Limited versions of the GT and Outback were available later in this generation's run.

The North American Legacy Outback wagon was released in July 1994 and FWD was standard for the 1995 model year with AWD optional. In 1995 AWD was so popular that for the 1997 model year, Subaru decided to make AWD standard equipment in all vehicles produced for the North American market from that year to today's current date, excluding the Subaru BRZ. The '96-'99 Outback models all used a version of the EJ25D engine.

All basic trim levels included sedan and wagon versions. In 1995, for the 1996 model year, the EJ25D was only available with an automatic transmission.

=== 30th Anniversary Edition (1999) ===
The 30th Anniversary Edition was a production version commemorating the 30th anniversary of Subaru in America. It included upgraded interior and sunroof, spoiler, and alloy wheels on the "L" trim level cars. Most 'L' models, some GT models and all Outback and SUS (Outback Sedan) had the 30th anniversary treatment.

== Japanese models ==
Subaru still offered a choice between front- and all-wheel-drive for its domestic market vehicles even after 1995.

=== GT (1993–1998) ===
Introduced on launch in October 1993, the Second Generation Subaru Legacy GT introduced Subaru's new Sequential Twin Turbo version of their 1994 cc flat-four engine. The new engine, known as the EJ20H, operated with one small turbocharger at low engine speeds to give good throttle response, supplemented by a second turbocharger at high engine speeds for additional power. Maximum power output was 250 ps (246.6 bhp) at 6,500 rpm and maximum torque was 308.9 Nm (227.8 lbf·ft) at 5,000 rpm.

The GT was available as five-door stepped-roof Touring Wagon (model code BG) or four-door Sedan (model code BD). Sedan versions were only available with Subaru's E-4AT four-speed automatic transmission with 4-Wheel Drive and Variable Torque Distribution Centre Differential (VTD-4WD), while Touring Wagon versions had the additional option of five-speed manual transmission with 4-Wheel Drive and Limited-Slip Viscous Centre Differential (VCD-4WD).

In June 1996, the EJ20H engine was upgraded to 260.0 ps (256.4 bhp) at 6,500 rpm and 318.7 Nm (235.1 lbf·ft) at 5,000 rpm.

=== GT/B-Spec (1993–1996) ===
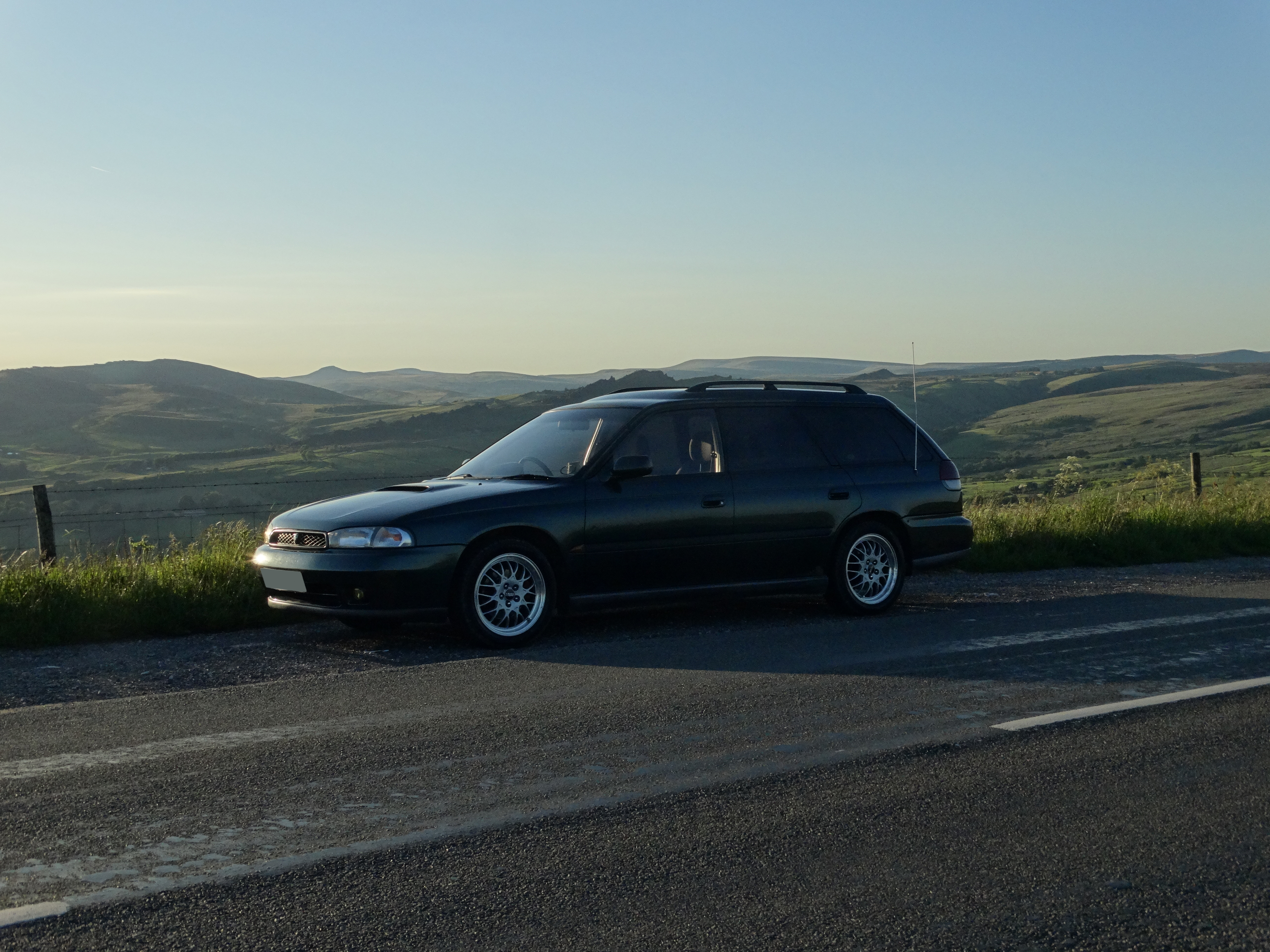
Subaru Legacy GT/B-Spec In the UK (Import)

The GT/B-Spec variation was introduced as a wagon-only model in October 1993 as a more sporting version of the Touring Wagon GT (BG5A), and fitted as standard with ABS brakes, Subaru Sports Suspension, and 16x5.5" inch forged BBS cross-spoke alloy wheels. Engine and gearbox specification was the same as the GT, having the 280 ps version of the EJ20H and a choice of either five-speed manual or four-speed automatic gearbox. Unlike the GT, the GT/B-Spec did not come with a power-operated driver's seat and optional extras like driver and passenger airbags, cruise control, sunroof, and wood panel trim was not available. The "B" in "GT/B-Spec" Stands for the forged BBS wheels that the car came with, out of the factory.

The GT/B-Spec was discontinued in June 1996 with the introduction of the GT-B (BG5B).

=== RS (1993–1998) ===
The RS was the GT sedan for the second generation Outback, and available in manual and for the first time automatic transmission. A GT sedan was available, with full leather and automatic transmission only.

=== GT-B (1996–1999) ===
The Legacy GT-B was a Japanese model station wagon introduced in June 1996 (BG5B). It included front and rear Bilstein struts, with the upgrade also available on the RS. The "B" designation stood for Bilstein. The Legacy GT was available for sale around the same time as the Nissan Avenir Salut turbocharged 2.0 L with AWD. The GT-B also offered larger brakes, sway bars, wheels, and some different interior options. Manual versions of the GT-B and RS also featured the EJ20R twin turbo motor, which was the first Legacy to offer 206KW. The manual also shared the TY752VBCAA manual transmission from the Version 3 STi. Auto versions of the GT-B and RS however featured the less powerful EJ20H, as used in the GT.

=== TS type R ===
TS type R Badge

The TS type R, was a 2.0L naturally aspirated DOHC version of the Subaru flat-four, and had comparable trim to the GT's. B spec TS type R's were also available, with the same body kit, interior, wheels, and Bilstein suspension.

=== 250T ===
The 250T was a 2.5L naturally aspirated DOHC version of the Subaru flat-four, available in full GT trim. B spec 250T's were also available, with the same body kit, wheels, and Bilstein suspension.

=== GT-B Limited (1997–1998) ===
GT-B Limited Twin Turbo

The GT-B Limited edition wagon was offered only for the BG5C revision (MY97), with an altered front bumper featuring additional 7 Inch Diameter spotlights alongside the normal GT-B fog lights. Other differences included a woodgrain MOMO wheel and gear knob, not otherwise available. Mechanically they were identical to standard BG5C GTB's.

== European models ==
=== LPG ===
The LPG option was introduced as an alternative fuel source on European models with the 2.0 L and 2.2 L engines, built by company Necam Koltec. The fuel tank was installed in the spare tire compartment, with the spare tire installed vertically on the left side of the trunk or cargo area.

== Legacy Twin Turbo ==
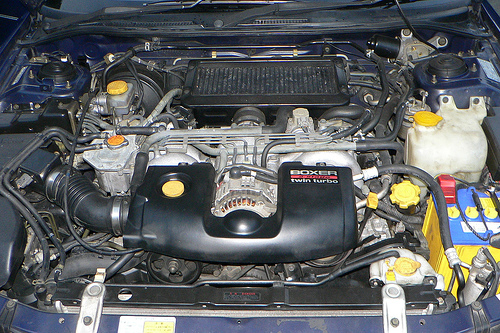
The Twin Turbo

Turbocharged versions continued to be available in most international markets. Specialty touring and racing versions were available in Japan, as well as the DOHC 2.0-liter twin sequential turbocharged (EJ20H & EJ20R) version on both the Legacy sedan and wagon, listed as "Boxer 2-stage Twin Turbo" on the engine cover shroud. This engine was popular with Japanese buyers due to reduced tax liability based on Japanese vehicle size legislation offering performance advantages over larger cars sold there with bigger engines and higher tax assessments. The twin turbo can only be installed on right-hand drive vehicles because the turbo on the left side interferes with both the brake master cylinder and steering linkage, among other things. A minor performance problem with the twin turbo was a "turbo dead zone" before the second turbo would kick in around 4700–5200 rpm. A continuous traction delivery system, called VTD by Subaru, was used with all JDM turbocharged vehicles with automatic transmission. The VTD AWD system is a permanent AWD due to its 36% / 64% split.

== Trim levels ==
The Brighton trim level also carried over from the facelifted first generation version that was priced below the "L" trim option.

The "GT" trim level appeared in 1995 for MY1996. The term "Limited" appeared on the "GT", known as the "GT Limited" for model year 1998. The term "Limited" was used by itself on the Outback for model year 1998.

GT models, first offered as a wagon trim package for the USA version in 1994, became a full-blown upgrade for model year 1996, using the new DOHC 2.5L EJ25D flat-4 engine. GT models continue to the present model, with Limited editions available, offering heated leather or cloth seats and trim and a tinted glass moonroof. Driver and front passenger airbags were added with the redesigned interior. New equipment added to the list of features included RF remote keyless entry, fog lights on the upper trim levels and variable-assist power steering.

== Gallery ==
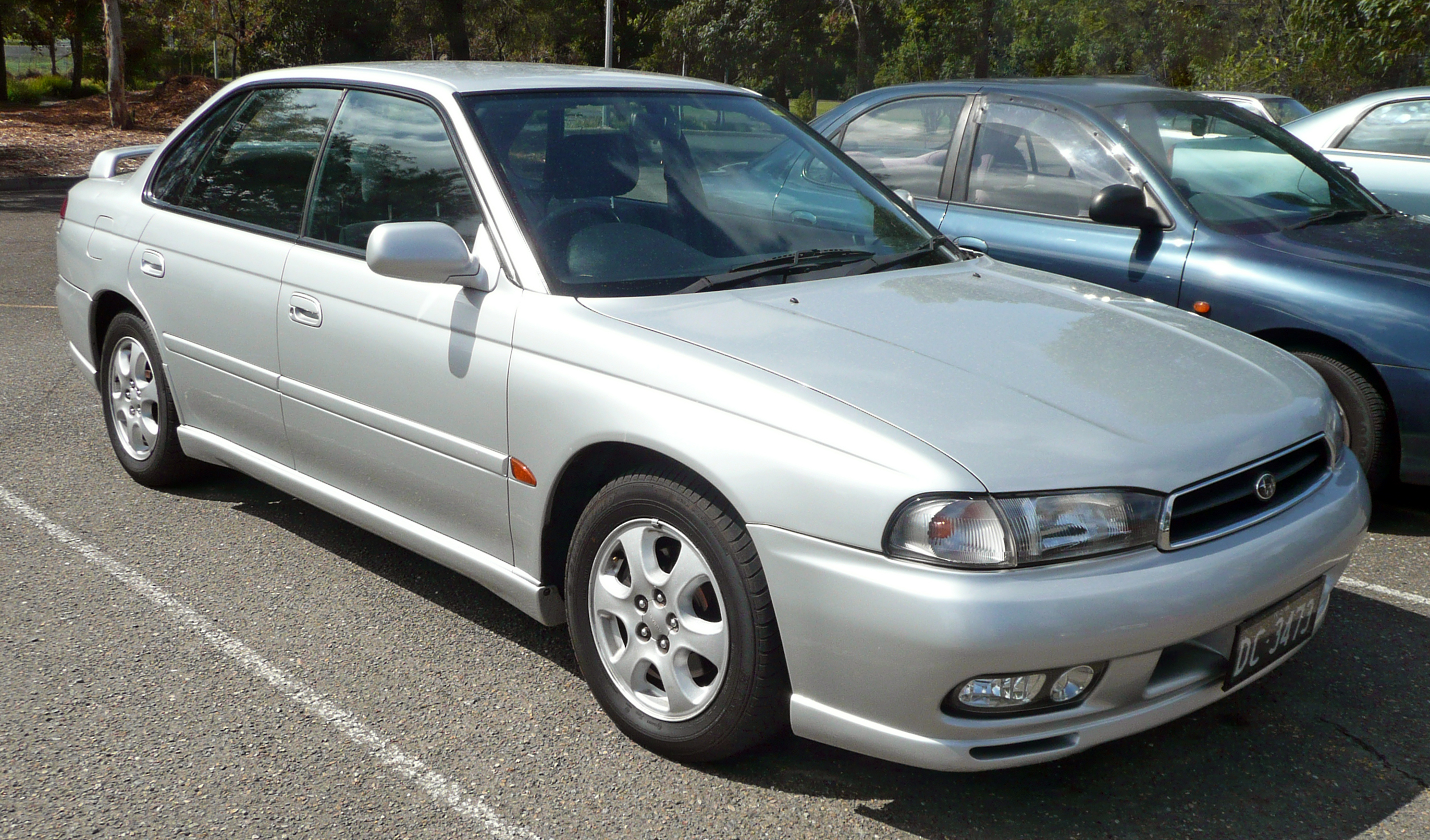
1996-1999 Subaru Liberty RX sedan with side turn signal repeater installed behind front wheel

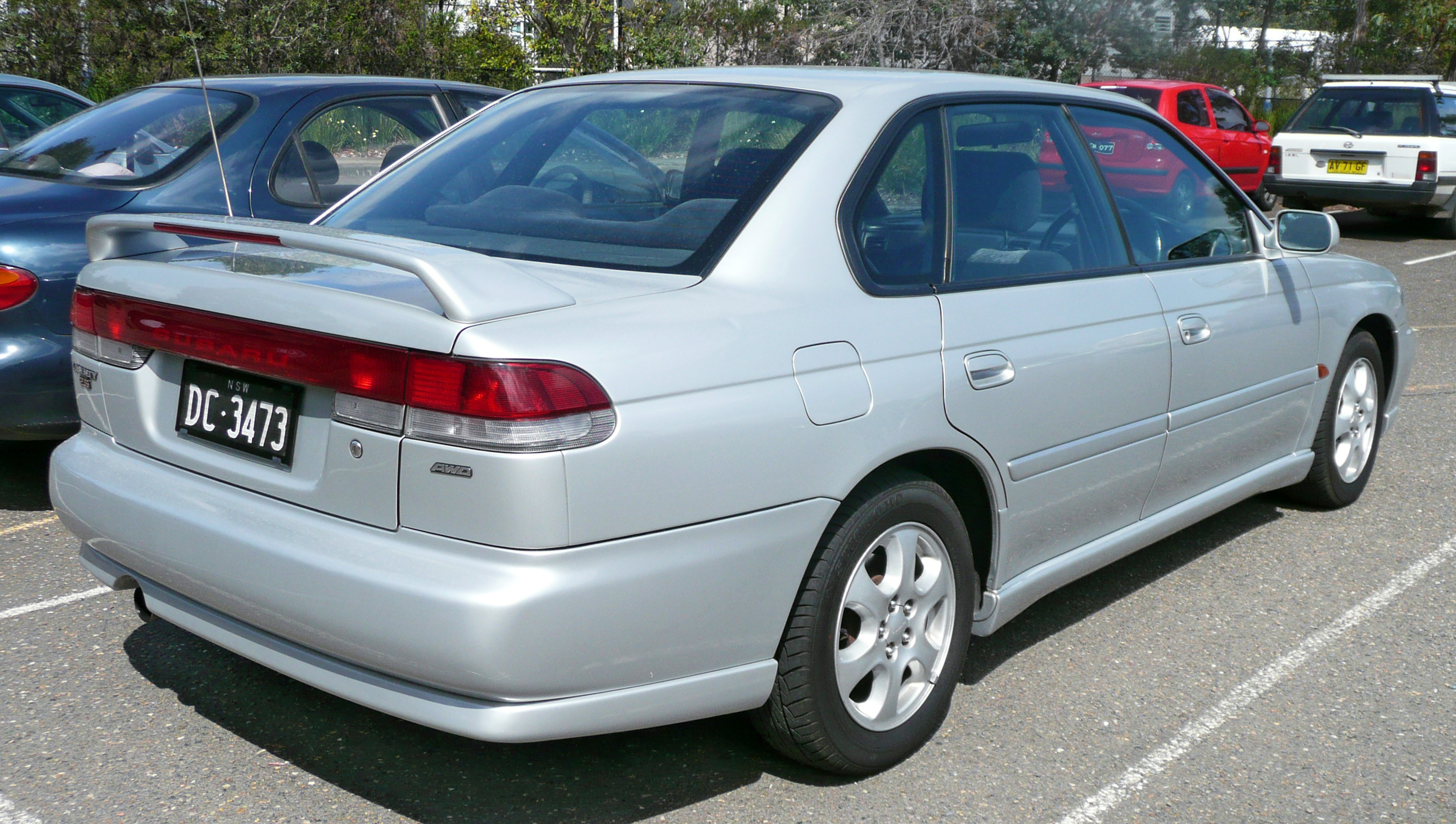
Subaru Liberty RX sedan with clear rear turn signal lenses and amber bulbs

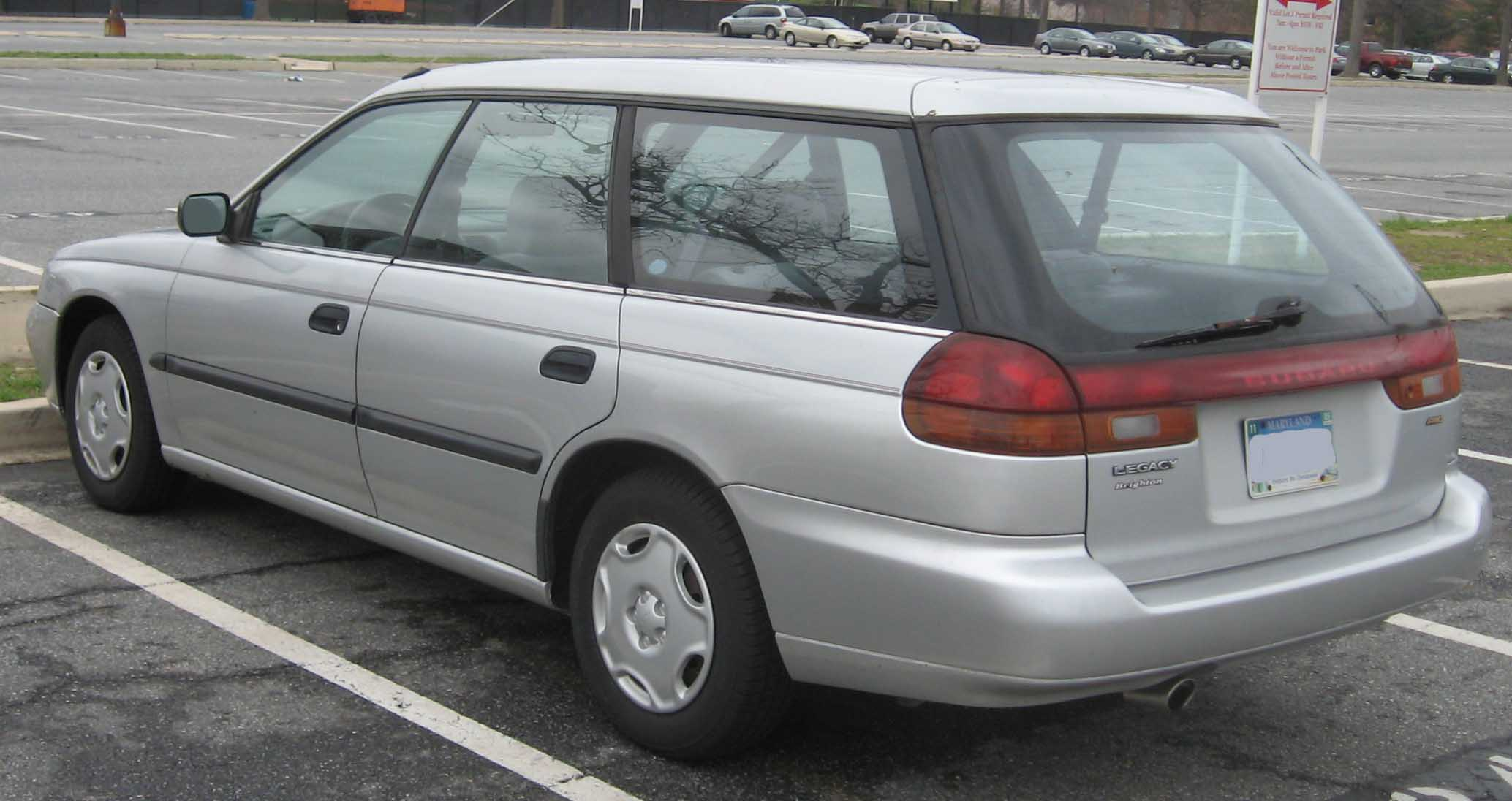
Subaru Legacy Brighton wagon with amber rear turn signal lenses

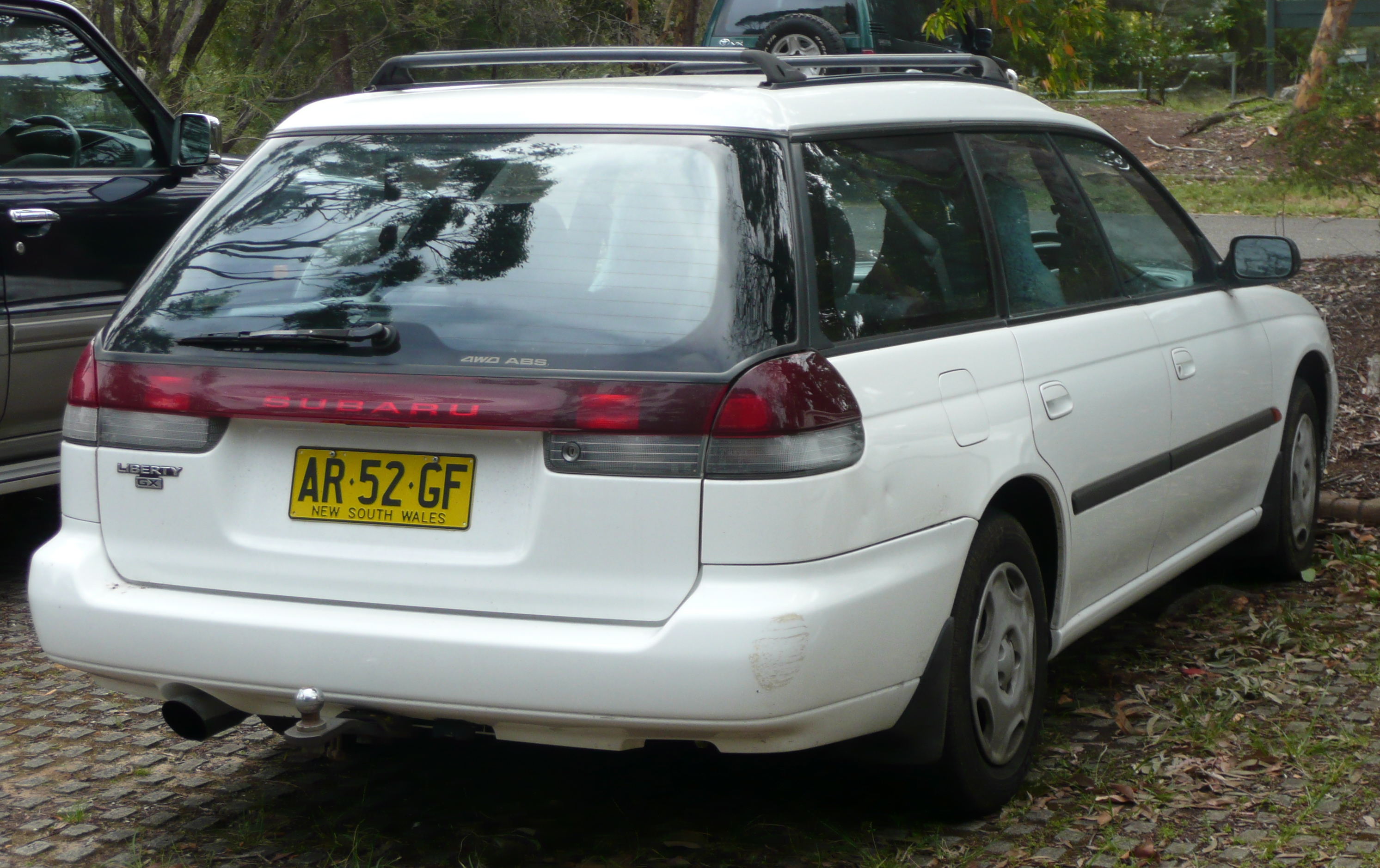
Subaru Liberty GX station wagon with clear rear turn signal lenses

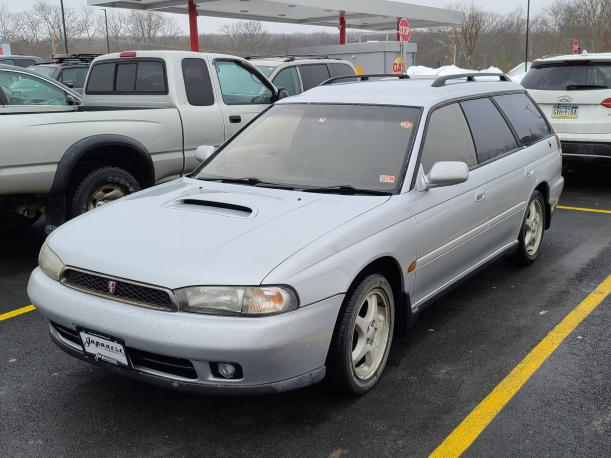
1995 Subaru Legacy GT imported from Japan to the US

== Specifications ==
=== Chassis types ===
Code	Body style
BD	Sedan
BG	Standard 'stepped' roof wagon
BK	flat roof wagon

=== Equipment ===
The remote keyless entry can unlock just the drivers door by pushing the unlock button once, while holding down the button unlocks all doors. Using the key to unlock the door after using the remote keyless entry to lock the doors will cause the alarm to sound, if equipped with a security system. The doors must be unlocked with the remote to avoid the security system being set off.

An unusual interior change placed the power window switches flat against the door panel, whereas the window switches for the first generation and third generation extended from the door panels and were oriented in a horizontal position and were located underneath the drivers or occupants hands for easy location and use, and integrated into the door pull and armrest. The express up feature for the driver's window was also removed, leaving express down only. The power door lock switch design was upgraded to a more conventional door lock switch, installed next to the power window switches, with a secondary power lock switch installed for the front passenger. This approach was also used on the 1990–1993 Honda Integra.

Side turn signal repeater lenses that were introduced on the USA 1992–1994 Legacy were replaced by a plastic cap that covers a hole where the side repeater is utilized internationally, and the color of the cap matches the color of the door rub strip on vehicles sold in North America.

Many EJ25D DOHC 2.5 L engines for this generation experienced internal head gasket leakage around 100,000 miles, (160,000 km). Potential causes may include inadequate head gasket design, coolant charge, and corrosion.
